= List of peerages inherited by women =

In the peerages of the British Isles, most titles have traditionally been created for men and with remainder to male heirs. However, some titles are created with special remainders to allow women to inherit them. Some of the oldest English baronies were created by writ and pass to female heirs when a peer dies with daughters and no sons, while some titles are created with a man's family in mind, if he is without sons and unlikely to produce any. The following is a list of women who have inherited titles with the British peerages.

== 14th century ==
Date inherited	Date of death or other loss of title	Title	Name	Other titles by marriage	Preceded in title by	Succeeded in title by
21 October 1314	19 October 1356	2nd Baroness Geneville	Joan de Geneville (Mortimer)	Countess of March	Geoffrey de Geneville, grandfather	Roger Mortimer, son
6 June 1333	10 December 1363	4th Countess of Ulster	Elizabeth de Burgh (Plantagenet)	Duchess of Clarence	William de Burgh, father	Philippa, daughter
4 August 1338	24 March 1399	2nd Countess of Norfolk	Margaret of Norfolk	Baroness Segrave by first marriage Baroness Manny by second marriage Duchess of Norfolk by creation	Thomas of Brotherton, father	Thomas Mowbray, grandson
31 May 1349	29 September 1349	3rd Baroness Wake of Liddell	Margaret Wake (Comyn)	Countess of Kent	Thomas Wake, brother	John, son
26 December 1352	7 August 1385	4th Countess of Kent; 5th Baroness Wake of Liddell	Joan Plantagenet (Montacute) (Holland)	Countess of Salisbury by second marriage Princess of Wales by third marriage	John Plantagenet, brother	Thomas Holland, son
10 December 1363	5 January 1382	5th Countess of Ulster	Philippa of Clarence	Countess of March	Elizabeth de Burgh, mother	Roger Mortimer, son
1372	3 April 1384	2nd Baroness Manny	Anne Hastings	Countess of Pembroke	Walter de Manny, father	John Hastings, son

== 15th century ==
Date inherited	Date of death or other loss of title	Title	Name	Other titles by marriage	Preceded in title by	Succeeded in title by
1425; 1437 de facto	1458	Countess of Lennox	Isabella	Duchess of Albany	Donnchadh, father	Extinct
3 November 1428	1462	5th Countess of Salisbury	Alice (Montacute) Neville		Thomas Montacute, father	Richard Neville, son
25 November 1431 suo jure	1485	8th Baroness FitzWalter	Elizabeth FitzWalter	Lady Dinham by second marriage	Walter FitzWalter, 7th Baron FitzWalter, father	John Radcliffe, 9th Baron FitzWalter, son
11 June 1446	3 January 1448	15th Countess of Warwick	Anne de Beauchamp		Henry de Beauchamp, father	Anne Neville and Richard Neville, aunt and uncle
3 January 1448	20 September 1492	16th Countess of Warwick	Anne (de Beauchamp) Neville	Countess of Salisbury	Anne de Beauchamp, niece	Edward Plantagenet, grandson
1450	1468	8th Baroness Ferrers of Chartley	Anne Ferrers (Devereux)		William de Ferrers, father	Walter Devereux, husband John Devereux, son
30 December 1460	12 May 1529	7th Baroness Harington	Cecily Bonville (Grey) (Stafford)	Marchioness of Dorset by first marriage Countess of Wiltshire by second marriage	William Bonville, father	Thomas Grey, son
18 February 1461	12 May 1529	2nd Baroness Bonville	Cecily Bonville (Grey) (Stafford)	Marchioness of Dorset by first marriage Countess of Wiltshire by second marriage	William Bonville, great-grandfather	Thomas Grey, son
14 January 1476	19 November 1481	8th Countess of Norfolk	Anne de Mowbray (Plantagenet)	Duchess of York; Duchess of Norfolk	John Mowbray, father	Extinct
14 January 1476	19 November 1481	Baroness Mowbray; Baroness Segrave	Anne de Mowbray (Plantagenet)	Duchess of York; Duchess of Norfolk	John Mowbray, father	John Howard, cousin abeyant
16 July 1491	27 August 1507	3rd Baroness Herbert	Elizabeth (Herbert) Somerset	Countess of Worcester	William Herbert, father	Henry Somerset, son

== 16th century ==
Date inherited	Date of death or other loss of title	Title	Name	Other titles	Preceded in title by	Succeeded in title by
1513	1539 attainted died 27 May 1541	8th or 2nd Countess of Salisbury	Margaret Pole		Edward Plantagenet, brother	Forfeit
1526	19 September 1580	12th Baroness Willoughby de Eresby	Catherine Willoughby (Brandon) (Bertie)	Duchess of Suffolk	William Willoughby, father	Peregrine Bertie, son
13 March 1540	17 April 1543 dispossessed died 28 January 1571	7th Baroness Bourchier	Anne Bourchier (Parr)		Henry Bourchier, father	Walter Devereux, cousin
14 April 1587	1 May 1591	16th Baroness de Ros	Elizabeth (Manners) Cecil		Edward Manners, father	William Cecil, son

== 17th century ==
Date inherited	Date of death or other loss of title	Title	Name	Other titles by marriage	Preceded in title by	Succeeded in title by
30 October 1605 claimed 1628	22 March 1676	14th Baroness de Clifford	Anne Clifford (Sackville) (Herbert)	Countess of Dorset by first marriage Countess of Pembroke and Montgomery by second marriage	George Clifford, father	Nicholas Tufton, grandson
14 October 1618	17 September 1637	2nd Baroness Clifton	Katherine Clifton (Stewart) (Hamilton)	Countess of March; Duchess of Lennox by first marriage Countess of Abercorn by second marriage	Gervase Clifton, father	James Stewart, son
1632	October 1649	19th Baroness de Ros	Katherine (Manners) Villiers (MacDonnell)	Duchess of Buckingham by first marriage Countess of Antrim; Marchioness of Antrim by second marriage	Francis Manners, father	George Villiers, son
1651	24 May 1654	13th Baroness Furnivall	Alethea (Talbot) Howard	Countess of Arundel	Gilbert Talbot, father	Henry Howard, son
12 September 1651	1698 resigned died 17 October 1716	3rd Duchess of Hamilton	Anne Hamilton (Douglas)		William Hamilton, uncle	James Hamilton, son
22 November 1651	11 March 1661	3rd Countess of Buccleuch	Mary Scott	Countess of Tarras	Francis Scott, father	Anne Scott, sister
11 September 1653	5 June 1698	2nd Countess of Dysart; 2nd Baroness Huntingtower	Elizabeth (Murray) (Tollemache) Maitland	Duchess of Lauderdale	William Murray, father	Lionel Tollemache, son
11 March 1661	6 February 1732	4th Countess of Buccleuch	Anne Scott	Duchess of Buccleuch by creation	Mary Scott, sister	Francis Scott, grandson
25 March 1667	23 April 1686	6th Baroness Wentworth	Henrietta Wentworth		Thomas Wentworth, grandfather	Anne Lovelace, aunt
July 1679	11 March 1705	3rd Countess of Wemyss	Margaret Wemyss (Mackenzie)	Lady Burntisland by first marriage Countess of Cromartie by second marriage	David Wemyss, father	David Wemyss, son
28 July 1685	7 February 1723	2nd Countess of Arlington	Isabella (Bennet) FitzRoy (Hanmer)	Duchess of Grafton	Henry Bennet, father	Charles FitzRoy, son
23 April 1686	1697	7th Baroness Wentworth	Anne Lovelace	Baroness Lovelace	Henrietta Wentworth, niece	Martha Johnson, granddaughter
19 June 1697	17 November 1705	7th Baroness Mordaunt	Mary Howard	Duchess of Norfolk	Henry Mordaunt, father	Charles Mordaunt, cousin
1697 confirmed 1702	1745	8th Baroness Wentworth	Martha Johnson		Anne Lovelace, grandmother	Edward Noel, first cousin twice removed

== 18th century ==
Date inherited	Date of death or other loss of title	Title	Name	Other titles by marriage	Preceded in title by	Succeeded in title by
1714	26 June 1718	4th Baroness Strange	Henrietta Stanley	Countess of Anglesey by first marriage Baroness Ashburnham by second marriage	William Stanley, father	Henrietta Ashburnham, daughter
1717	19 August 1758	14th Countess of Erroll	Mary Hay (Falconer)		Charles Hay, brother	James Hay, great-nephew
25 December 1717	13 March 1741	15th Baroness Ferrers of Chartley	Elizabeth (Shirley) Compton	Countess of Northampton	Robert Shirley, grandfather	Abeyant (later Charlotte Townshend, daughter)
26 June 1718	1732	5th Baroness Strange	Henrietta Ashburnham		Henrietta Stanley, mother	James Stanley, great-uncle
16 June 1722	24 October 1733	2nd Duchess of Marlborough	Henrietta Godolphin	Countess of Godolphin	John Churchill, father	Charles Spencer, nephew
29 January 1737	5 December 1756	2nd Countess of Orkney	Anne (Douglas-Hamilton) O'Brien	Countess Inchiquin	George Douglas-Hamilton, father	Mary O'Brien, daughter
5 June 1740	10 January 1797	2nd Marchioness Grey	Jemima (Campbell) Yorke	Countess of Hardwicke	Henry Grey, grandfather	Extinct
5 June 1740	10 January 1797	4th Baroness Lucas	Jemima (Campbell) Yorke	Countess of Hardwicke	Henry Grey, grandfather	Amabel Hume-Campbell, daughter
14 September 1749	1752	2nd Viscountess Cobham	Hester (Grenville) Temple	Countess Temple by creation	Richard Temple, brother	Richard Grenville-Temple, son
1749	3 September 1770	16th Baroness Ferrers of Chartley	Charlotte (Compton) Townshend	Viscountess Townshend	Elizabeth Compton, mother abeyant 1741–1749	George Townshend, son
3 October 1754	3 September 1770	7th Baroness Compton	Charlotte (Compton) Townshend	Viscountess Townshend	James Compton, father	George Townshend, son
7 February 1750	5 December 1776	2nd Baroness Percy	Elizabeth (Seymour) Percy	Duchess of Northumberland	Algernon Seymour, father	Hugh Percy, son
15 December 1753	8 December 1754	6th Baroness Clifford	Charlotte (Boyle) Cavendish	Marchioness of Hartington	Richard Boyle	William Cavendish, son
5 December 1756	10 May 1791	3rd Countess of Orkney	Mary O'Brien	Countess Inchiquin	Anne O'Brien, mother	Mary FitzMaurice, daughter
8 January 1764	13 October 1805	8th Baroness Strange	Charlotte Murray	Duchess of Atholl	James Murray, father	John Murray, son
1766	29 January 1839	19th Countess of Sutherland	Elizabeth (Sutherland) Leveson-Gower	Marchioness of Stafford; Duchess of Sutherland	William Sutherland, father	George Sutherland-Leveson-Gower, son
27 April 1782	14 March 1793	2nd Baroness Dynevor	Cecil de Cardonnel		William Talbot, 1st Earl Talbot, father	George Talbot Rice, son
16 May 1778	27 January 1784	de jure 12th Baroness Darcy de Knayth; 9th Baroness Conyers	Amelia (Darcy) Osborne	Marchioness of Carmarthen	Robert Darcy, father	George Osborne, son
28 April 1786	8 January 1840	6th Countess of Loudoun	Flora Mure-Campbell	Marchioness of Hastings	James Mure-Campbell, father	George Rawdon-Hastings, son
2 October 1789	11 April 1808	16th Baroness Botreaux; 15th Baroness Hungerford; 13th Baroness de Moleyns; 13th Baroness Hastings de Hastings; 12th Baroness Hastings de Hungerford	Elizabeth (Hastings) Rawdon	Countess of Moira	Francis Hastings, brother	Francis Rawdon-Hastings, son
10 May 1791	30 December 1831	4th Countess of Orkney	Mary (O'Brien) FitzMaurice		Mary O'Brien, mother	Thomas FitzMaurice, grandson

== 19th century ==
Date inherited	Date of death or other loss of title	Title	Name	Other titles by marriage	Preceded in title by	Succeeded in title by
1806	9 January 1831	21st Baroness de Ros	Charlotte (Boyle Walsingham) FitzGerald-de Ros		abeyant 1687–1806 (previously George Villiers, cousin)	Henry FitzGerald-de Ros, son
29 October 1810	18 November 1858	20th Baroness Grey de Ruthyn	Barbara Rawdon-Hastings	Marchioness of Hastings	Henry Yelverton, father	Henry Rawdon-Hastings, son
17 June 1813	12 April 1823	2nd Baroness Barham	Diana Noel		Charles Middleton, father	Charles Noel, son
25 February 1816	2 January 1831	9th Viscountess Massereene	Harriet Skeffington	Viscountess Ferrard	Chichester Skeffington, father	John Skeffington, son
9 March 1821	22 September 1840	7th Countess of Dysart	Louisa Tollemache Manners		Wilbraham Tollemache, brother	Lionel Tollemache, grandson
10 March 1823	11 November 1867	2nd Baroness Keith	Margaret Elphinstone de Flahault	Comtesse de Flahault	George Elphinstone, father	Extinct
1837	11 November 1867	7th Lady Nairne not recognised	Margaret Elphinstone de Flahault	Comtesse de Flahault	William Nairne, cousin	Emily Petty-Fitzmaurice, daughter
14 February 1835	22 January 1855	2nd Baroness Basset	Frances Basset		Francis Basset, father	Extinct
1856	16 May 1860	11th Baroness Wentworth	Anne Isabella Byron	Baroness Byron	Thomas Noel, uncle abeyant 1815–1856	Byron Noel-King, grandson
1868	23 January 1874	10th Countess of Loudoun	Edith Rawdon-Hastings		Henry Rawdon-Hastings, brother	Charles Clifton, son
1888	17 November 1926	13th Baroness Conyers	Marcia Pelham	Countess of Yarborough	Sackville Lane-Fox, father abeyant 1895–1896	Sackville Pelham, son
1903	17 November 1926	7th Baroness Fauconberg	Marcia Pelham	Countess of Yarborough	Joan Neville abeyant 1490–1903	Sackville Pelham, son
26 March 1889	17 October 1944	11th Lady Kinloss	Mary Morgan-Grenville		Richard Temple-Grenville, father	Mary Freeman-Grenville, granddaughter
1896	31 August 1971	11th Baroness Beaumont	Mona (Stapleton) Fitzalan-Howard	Baroness Howard of Glossop	Miles Stapleton, father abeyant 1888–1892	Miles Stapleton-Fitzalan-Howard, son

== 20th century ==
Date inherited	Date of death or other loss of title	Title	Name	Other titles by marriage	Preceded in title by	Succeeded in title by
1903	29 April 1929	16th Baroness Darcy de Knayth	Violet Herbert	Countess of Powis	Sackville Lane-Fox, father abeyant 1490–1903	Mervyn Herbert, son
28 August 1906	18 June 1917	14th Baroness Wentworth	Ada King-Milbanke		Ralph King-Milbanke, father	Anne Blunt, aunt
29 April 1907	4 May 1939	25th Baroness de Ros	Mary (FitzGerald-de Ros) Dawson	Countess of Dartrey	Dudley FitzGerald-de Ros, father	Una Ross, daughter abeyant 1939–1943
1908	28 August 1945	12th Lady Herries of Terregles	Gwendolen Fitzalan-Howard	Duchess of Norfolk	Marmaduke Constable-Maxwell, father	Bernard Fitzalan-Howard, son
16 January 1909	21 December 1919	2nd Baroness Amherst of Hackney	Mary Cecil	Lady William Cecil	William Tyssen-Amherst, father	William Alexander Evering Cecil, son
1 February 1909	28 May 1962	The 2nd Baroness Burton	Nellie Lisa Bass		Michael Bass, 1st Baron Burton, father	Michael Baillie, 3rd Baron Burton, grandson
12 January 1912	26 February 1959	2nd Duchess of Fife	Princess Alexandra	Princess Arthur of Connaught	Alexander Duff, father	James Carnegie, nephew
25 March 1913	24 December 1936	2nd Viscountess Wolseley	Frances Garnet Wolseley		Garnet Joseph Wolseley, father	Extinct
21 January 1914	18 August 1926	2nd Baroness Strathcona and Mount Royal	Margaret Howard		Donald Alexander Smith, father	Donald Sterling Palmer Howard, son
14 November 1914	9 October 1944	2nd Countess Roberts	Aileen Roberts		Frederick Roberts, father	Ada Lewin, sister
12 November 1915	30 September 1969	12th Countess of Seafield	Nina Studley-Herbert		James Ogilvie-Grant, father	Ian Ogilvie-Grant, son
18 June 1917	15 December 1917	15th Baroness Wentworth	Anne Blunt		Ada King-Milbanke, niece	Judith Blunt-Lytton, daughter
15 December 1917	8 August 1957	16th Baroness Wentworth	Judith Blunt-Lytton		Anne Blunt, mother	Noel Lytton, son
3 July 1918	20 July 1958	2nd Viscountess Rhondda	Margaret Mackworth		David Alfred Thomas, father	Extinct
17 May 1920	24 February 1960	12th Countess of Loudoun	Edith Abney-Hastings		Charles Clifton, uncle	Barbara Abney-Hastings, daughter
7 March 1921	24 February 1960	23rd Baroness Botreaux; 20th Baroness Hastings	Edith Abney-Hastings		Charles Rawdon-Hastings, uncle abeyant 1920–1921	Abeyant
7 March 1921	24 February 1960	7th Baroness Stanley	Edith Abney-Hastings		Ferdinando Stanley abeyant 1594–1921	Abeyant
23 February 1921	12 December 1974	14th Baroness Strange	Elizabeth Philipps	Viscountess St Davids	Ferdinando Stanley abeyant 1594–1921	Jestyn Philipps, son
23 February 1921	12 December 1974	22nd Baroness Hungerford; 21st Baroness de Moleyns	Elizabeth Philipps	Viscountess St Davids	Charles Clifton, uncle abeyant 1920–1921	Jestyn Philipps, son
20 March 1925	9 February 1966	2nd Baroness Ravensdale	Irene Curzon, 2nd Baroness Ravensdale	Baroness Ravensdale of Kedleston created for life	George Curzon, father	Nicholas Mosley, nephew
1935	2 June 1975	10th Countess of Dysart	Wenefryde Scott		William Tollemache, uncle	Rosamund Greaves, daughter
24 January 1941	16 May 1978	23rd Countess of Erroll	Diana Hay (Moncreiffe)		Josslyn Hay, father	Merlin Hay, son
March 1943	24 February 2008	18th Baroness Darcy de Knayth	Davina Ingrams		Mervyn Herbert, father	Caspar Ingrams, son
1943	9 October 1956	26th Baroness de Ros	Una Dawson Ross		Mary Dawson, mother	Georgiana Maxwell, granddaughter abeyant 1956–1958
17 October 1944	30 September 2012	12th Lady Kinloss	Mary Freeman-Grenville		Mary Morgan-Grenville, grandmother	Teresa Freeman-Grenville, daughter
9 October 1944	1955	3rd Countess Roberts	Ada Lewin		Aileen Roberts, sister	Extinct
16 April 1956	17 April 1982	11th Lady Ruthven of Freeland	Bridget (Hore-Ruthven) (Howard) Monckton	Countess of Carlisle by first marriage Viscountess Monckton of Brenchley by second marriage	Walter Hore-Ruthven, father	Charles Howard, son
1958	21 April 1983	27th Baroness de Ros	Georgiana Maxwell		Una Ross, grandmother abeyant 1956–1958	Peter Maxwell, son
24 February 1960	1 November 2002	13th Countess of Loudoun	Barbara (Huddleston) Abney-Hastings		Edith Abney-Hastings, mother	Michael Abney-Hastings, son
1 February 1963	9 December 2019	24th Countess of Sutherland	Elizabeth Sutherland		George Sutherland-Leveson-Gower, uncle	Alistair Charles St. Clair Sutherland, eldest son
30 December 1965	6 July 1995	20th Lady Sempill	Ann Forbes-Sempill		William Forbes-Sempill, father	James Chant-Sempill, son
26 May 1966	21 September 1974	11th Countess of Kintore	Ethel Sydney Keith-Falconer	Viscountess Stonehaven	Arthur George Keith-Falconer, brother	James Ian Baird, son
22 July 1969	4 May 1974	10th Baroness Wharton	Elisabeth Kemeys-Tynte		John Kemeys-Tynte, brother	Myrtle Robertson, daughter abeyant 1974–1990
1970	25 December 2012	27th Baroness Dacre	Rachel Douglas-Home		Thomas Brand, father abeyant 1965–1970	James Douglas-Home, son
22 April 1971	1990	2nd Baroness Portal of Hungerford	Rosemary Portal		Charles Portal, father	Extinct
19 April 1972	27 May 2002	14th Baroness Dudley	Barbara Hamilton		Ferdinando Dudley Henry Lea Smith, brother	Jim Anthony Hill Wallace, son
31 January 1975	25 November 2014	14th Lady Herries of Terregles	Anne Cowdrey	Baroness Cowdrey of Tonbridge	Bernard Fitzalan-Howard, father	Mary Mumford, sister
21 April 1975		31st Countess of Mar	Margaret (Lane) of Mar		James of Mar, father	
1982	11 March 2005	16th Baroness Strange	Cherry Drummond of Megginch		John Drummond, father	Adam Drummond, son
29 March 1983		28th Baroness Willoughby de Eresby	Nancy Jane Marie Heathcote-Drummond-Willoughby		James Heathcote-Drummond-Willoughby, father	
1975	2003	11th Countess of Dysart	Rosamund Greaves		Wenefryde Scott, mother	Katherine Grant, sister
27 August 1979	13 June 2017	2nd Countess Mountbatten of Burma	Patricia Knatchbull	Baroness Brabourne	Louis Mountbatten, father	Norton Knatchbull, son
31 August 1979	3 September 2024	21st Lady Saltoun	Flora Fraser		Alexander Fraser, father	Katharine Fraser, daughter
19 December 1985		8th Baroness Braye	Mary Penelope Verney-Cave			
1990	15 May 2000	11th Baroness Wharton	Myrtle Robertson		Elisabeth Kemeys-Tynte, mother abeyant 1974–1990	Myles Robertson, son
30 June 1995	23 January 2023	16th Baroness Berners	Pamela Vivien Kirkham		Vera Ruby Williams, mother abeyant 1992–1995	Rupert Kirkham, son
May 1999		11th Baroness Arlington	Jennifer Nelson Forwood		John FitzRoy, uncle abeyant 1936–1999	

== 21st century ==
Date inherited	Date of death or other loss of title	Title	Name	Other titles	Preceded in title by	Succeeded in title by
14 October 2002		3rd Baroness Simon of Wythenshawe	Matilda Simon	formerly Baron Simon of Wythenshawe, but title changed after her gender transition.	Roger Simon, father	
17 December 2003	8 November 2011	12th Countess of Dysart	Katherine Grant		Rosamund Greaves, sister	John Grant, son
25 June 2004	13 July 2024	10th Baroness Howard de Walden	Mary Hazel Caridwen Czernin		John Osmael Scott-Ellis, father abeyant 1999–2004	Peter Czernin, son
17 May 2012	2 March 2013	9th Baroness Fauconberg; 15th Baroness Conyers	Diana Miller	Countess of Mértola	Sackville George Pelham, father abeyant 1948–2012	titles abeyant
30 September 2012		13th Lady Kinloss	Teresa Freeman-Grenville		Mary Freeman-Grenville, mother	
8 May 2014		29th Baroness Dacre	Emily Douglas-Home		James Douglas-Home, father	
25 November 2014	7 April 2017	15th Lady Herries of Terregles	Mary Mumford		Anne Cowdrey, sister	Jane Kerr, sister
7 April 2017		16th Lady Herries of Terregles	Jane Kerr	Marchioness of Lothian	Mary Mumford, sister	
18 September 2019		9th Lady Balfour of Burleigh	Victoria Bruce-Winkler		Robert Bruce, father	
3 September 2024		22nd Lady Saltoun	Katharine Fraser		Flora Fraser, mother	

== See also ==
- List of peerages created for women
- Women in the House of Lords
  - List of female members of the House of Lords
