= Charles Pelham =

Charles Pelham may refer to:

- Charles Pelham (died 1763), British landowner and politician
- Charles Pelham (American politician) (1835–1908), U.S. Representative from Alabama
- Charles Pelham, Lord Worsley (1887–1914), British peer who died in action during the First World War
- Charles Pelham (1781-1846), 1st Earl of Yarborough
- Charles Pelham, 4th Earl of Yarborough (1859–1936), British peer
- Charles Pelham, 8th Earl of Yarborough (born 1963), British peer and landowner
- Charles Anderson-Pelham, 1st Baron Yarborough (1749–1823), British politician
