= Marcia Pelham, Countess of Yarborough =

British peer (1863–1926)

The Right Honourable The Countess of Yarborough OBE
- The Countess of Yarborough as Countess Tchoglokov at the Devonshire House Ball of 1897

Personal details
- Born: Marcia Amelia Mary Lane-Fox; 18 October 1863
- Died: 17 November 1926 (aged 63) Lincolnshire, England
- Party: Conservative
- Spouse: Charles Pelham, 4th Earl of Yarborough (m. 1886)
- Relations: Violet Herbert, Countess of Powis (sister)
- Children: Charles Pelham, Lord Worsley; Sackville Pelham, 5th Earl of Yarborough; D'Arcy Francis Pelham; Marcus Pelham, 6th Earl of Yarborough
- Parent(s): Sackville Lane-Fox, 12th Baron Conyers; Mary Curteis

Marcia Amelia Mary Pelham, Countess of Yarborough and 13th Baroness Conyers, 7th Baroness Fauconberg and 9th Countess of Mértola, OBE (18 October 1863 – 17 November 1926) was a British peer who worked in politics for the Conservative Party.

== Early life ==
Marcia was born on 18 October 1863. She was the eldest daughter of Sackville Lane-Fox, 12th Baron Conyers (1827–1888) and his wife, Mary Curteis (d. 1921). Her brother Sackville FitzRoy Henry Lane-Fox died unmarried in 1879 (before their father's death) and her sister was Violet Herbert, Countess of Powis, later suo jure Baroness Darcy de Knayth.

== Titles ==
In 1888, the countess's father died and his title fell into abeyance, but the abeyance was terminated in her favour four years later. Eleven years later, in 1903, the barony of Fauconberg, a peerage which had been in abeyance since the death of the last holder, the 6th Baroness Fauconberg, in 1490, was also called out of abeyance for Marcia Pelham. At the same time the House of Lords found that her father had held the barony of Darcy de Knayth and confirmed it in favour of her sister, Violet Herbert, Countess of Powis. Due to the peerages which thus came to her, Marcia Pelham brought 153 armorial quarterings to her husband's family.

In 1920, the countess was appointed an Officer of the Order of the British Empire in recognition of her role as Commandant of Brocklesby Hall, her husband's ancestral home, which had served as an auxiliary hospital during the First World War.

== Personal life ==
On 5 August 1886, she married Charles Pelham, 4th Earl of Yarborough (1859–1936). He was a son of Charles Anderson-Pelham, 3rd Earl of Yarborough and Lady Victoria Alexandrina Hare, the fourth daughter of William Hare, 2nd Earl of Listowel. After the 3rd Earl's death in 1875, his widow married John Maunsell Richardson, a Cambridge cricketer and Member of Parliament for Brigg. Together, Charles and Marcia Yarborough were the parents of four sons:

- Charles Pelham, Lord Worsley (1887–1914), who married Alexandra Mary Freesia Vivian (1890–1963), fourth daughter of Hussey Vivian, 3rd Baron Vivian. He was killed in action not long after the beginning of the First World War, aged 27.
- Sackville Pelham (1888–1948), who married Nancye Brocklehurst (d. 1977), a daughter of Florence Little, daughter of General Sir Archibald Little, and Alfred Brocklehurst, a brother of John Brocklehurst, 1st Baron Ranksborough. He succeeded as 5th Earl of Yarborough.
- D'Arcy Francis Pelham (1892–1892), who died in infancy.
- Marcus Herbert Pelham (1893–1966), later 6th Earl of Yarborough, who married Pamela Douglas-Pennant (1896–1968), a daughter of Edward Douglas-Pennant, 3rd Baron Penrhyn and Blanche Georgiana FitzRoy, third daughter of Charles FitzRoy, 3rd Baron Southampton. Pamela was a sister and co-heiress of Hugh Douglas-Pennant, 4th Baron Penrhyn.

Marcia Yarborough died of sleeping sickness at Brocklesby on 17 November 1926. Her peerages were inherited by the elder of her two surviving sons, Sackville.

Portuguese nobility
Preceded by Sackville-Lane-Fox	Countess of Mértola; 1888 – 1926	Succeeded by Sackville Pelham
Peerage of England
In abeyance Title last held by Sackville Lane-Fox	Baroness Conyers; 1892 – 1926	Succeeded by Sackville Pelham
In abeyance Title last held by Joan Neville	Baroness Fauconberg; 1903 – 1926	Succeeded by Sackville Pelham
