= Alexandra Pelham, Lady Worsley =

British courtier

- Born: 27 February 1890
- Died: 21 September 1963 (aged 73)
- Spouse: Charles Pelham (m. 1911; died 1914)
- Father: Hussey Vivian
- Relatives: Vivian family George Vivian (brother)

Alexandra Mary Freesia Pelham, Lady Worsley, CBE (née Vivian; 27 February 1890–21 September 1963) was a British volunteer and courtier.

== Biography ==
Alexandra was a daughter of Hussey Vivian, 3rd Baron Vivian and a godchild of Queen Alexandra. Among her siblings were Hon Dorothy Maud Vivian (1879-1939), who married Field Marshal Douglas Haig, 1st Earl Haig, commander of the British Expeditionary Force during World War I, and George Vivian, 4th Baron Vivian (1878-1940).

On 31 January 1911, she married Lt. Charles Pelham, Lord Worsley, the eldest son and heir of the 4th Earl of Yarborough. In 1914, Lady Worsley's husband was killed on active service in Belgium during World War I after only three years of marriage. She purchased the land where Lord Worsley's body was buried in the town of Zandvoorde, and after Worsley's body was re-interred, the land became the site of the Household Cavalry Memorial.

The couple did not have any children and Lady Worsley did not remarry. In 1945, she was appointed an OBE for her service to the war effort with the WVS and became an Extra Woman of the Bedchamber to Queen Elizabeth in 1947. In 1953, she was promoted to a CBE for her work with the Victoria League and died, aged 73, in 1963.

== Sources ==
- The London Gazette
- Burke's Peerage & Gentry
