= Hussey Vivian =

Hussey Vivian may refer to:

- Hussey Vivian, 1st Baron Vivian (1775–1842), British peer
- Hussey Vivian, 3rd Baron Vivian (1834–1893), British peer
