= Lord-Lieutenant of Lincolnshire =

British monarch's personal representative in Lincolnshire

The Lord-Lieutenant of Lincolnshire (UK: /lɛfˈtɛnənt/) is the British monarch's personal representative in the county of Lincolnshire. Historically, the lord-lieutenant was responsible for organising the county's militia. In 1871, the lord-lieutenant's responsibility over the local militia was removed. However, it was not until 1921 that they formally lost the right to call upon able-bodied men to fight when needed. Since 1660, all lord-lieutenants have also been Custos Rotulorum of Lincolnshire.

The lord-lieutenancy is now an honorary titular position, usually awarded to a retired notable person in the county. Until 1975, this had been awarded to a peer connected to the county.

== List of Lord-Lieutenants of Lincolnshire ==
This is a list of people who have served as Lord-Lieutenant of Lincolnshire.

Portrait	Name	Term of office	Monarch
	Edward Clinton; 1st Earl of Lincoln	1550/1552 – date unknown	Edward VI (1547–1553)
	Henry Manners; 2nd Earl of Rutland	1551 – c.1563	Edward VI (1547–1553)
	Henry Manners; 2nd Earl of Rutland	1551 – c.1563	Mary I (1553–1558)
	Henry Manners; 2nd Earl of Rutland	1551 – c.1563	Elizabeth I (1558–1603)
Records incomplete			Elizabeth I (1558–1603)
	Edward Manners; 3rd Earl of Rutland	1582/1585 – 14 April 1587	Elizabeth I (1558–1603)
	William Cecil; 1st Baron Burghley	November 1587 – 4 August 1598	Elizabeth I (1558–1603)
Records incomplete			Elizabeth I (1558–1603)
Records incomplete			James I (1603–1625)
	Roger Manners; 5th Earl of Rutland	20 September 1603 – 26 June 1612	James I (1603–1625)
	Francis Manners; 6th Earl of Rutland	15 July 1612 – 23 January 1629	James I (1603–1625)
	Francis Manners; 6th Earl of Rutland	15 July 1612 – 23 January 1629	Charles I (1635–1649)
	Robert Bertie; 1st Earl of Lindsey (Royalist)	3 January 1629 – 1642	Charles I (1635–1649)
	Francis Willoughby; 5th Baron Willoughby of Parham (Parliamentary)	c.1643 – c.1649	Charles I (1635–1649)
Interregnum
	Montagu Bertie; 2nd Earl of Lindsey	13 July 1660 – 25 July 1666	Charles II (1660–1685)
	Robert Bertie; 3rd Earl of Lindsey	9 August 1666 – 6 April 1700	Charles II (1660–1685)
	Robert Bertie; 3rd Earl of Lindsey	9 August 1666 – 6 April 1700	James II & VII 1685–1689
	Robert Bertie; 3rd Earl of Lindsey	9 August 1666 – 6 April 1700	William III & II and Mary II 1689–1694
	Robert Bertie; 3rd Earl of Lindsey	9 August 1666 – 6 April 1700	William III & II 1694–1702
	Robert Bertie; 1st Duke of Ancaster and Kesteven	6 April 1700 – 26 July 1723	William III & II 1694–1702
	Robert Bertie; 1st Duke of Ancaster and Kesteven	6 April 1700 – 26 July 1723	Anne 1702–1714
	Robert Bertie; 1st Duke of Ancaster and Kesteven	6 April 1700 – 26 July 1723	George I 1714–1727
	Peregrine Bertie; 2nd Duke of Ancaster and Kesteven; PC	20 February 1724 – 1 January 1742	George I 1714–1727
	Peregrine Bertie; 2nd Duke of Ancaster and Kesteven; PC	20 February 1724 – 1 January 1742	George II 1727–1760
	General Peregrine Bertie; 3rd Duke of Ancaster and Kesteven	12 March 1742 – 12 August 1778	George II 1727–1760
	General Peregrine Bertie; 3rd Duke of Ancaster and Kesteven	12 March 1742 – 12 August 1778	George III 1760–1820
	Robert Bertie; 4th Duke of Ancaster and Kesteven	14 January 1779 – 8 July 1779	George III 1760–1820
	Brownlow Bertie; 5th Duke of Ancaster and Kesteven	9 August 1779 – 8 February 1809	George III 1760–1820
	John Cust; 1st Earl Brownlow	25 February 1809 – 20 August 1852	George III 1760–1820
	John Cust; 1st Earl Brownlow	25 February 1809 – 20 August 1852	George IV 1820–1830
	John Cust; 1st Earl Brownlow	25 February 1809 – 20 August 1852	William IV 1830–1837
	John Cust; 1st Earl Brownlow	25 February 1809 – 20 August 1852	Victoria 1837–1901
	Charles Manners; Marquess of Granby	20 August 1852 – 13 February 1857 (Note: The Marquess of Granby relinquished his appointment on his succession of the Dukedom of Rutland.)	Victoria 1837–1901
	Charles Anderson-Pelham; 2nd Earl of Yarborough	13 February 1857 – 7 January 1862	Victoria 1837–1901
	Gilbert Heathcote; 1st Baron Aveland	21 February 1862 – 6 September 1867	Victoria 1837–1901
	Adelbert Brownlow-Cust; 3rd Earl Brownlow	4 December 1867 – 17 March 1921	Victoria 1837–1901
	Adelbert Brownlow-Cust; 3rd Earl Brownlow	4 December 1867 – 17 March 1921	Edward VII 1901–1910
	Adelbert Brownlow-Cust; 3rd Earl Brownlow	4 December 1867 – 17 March 1921	George V 1910–1936
	Charles Anderson-Pelham; 4th Earl of Yarborough	16 April 1921 – 12 July 1936	George V 1910–1936
	Charles Anderson-Pelham; 4th Earl of Yarborough	16 April 1921 – 12 July 1936	Edward VIII 1936
	Peregrine Cust; 6th Baron Brownlow	14 August 1936 – 1 May 1950	Edward VIII 1936
	Peregrine Cust; 6th Baron Brownlow	14 August 1936 – 1 May 1950	George VI 1936–1952
	James Heathcote-Drummond-Willoughby; 3rd Earl of Ancaster	1 May 1950 – 17 November 1975	George VI 1936–1952
	James Heathcote-Drummond-Willoughby; 3rd Earl of Ancaster	1 May 1950 – 17 November 1975	Elizabeth II 1952–2023
	Sir Henry Nevile	17 November 1975 – 31 March 1995	Elizabeth II 1952–2023
	Bridget Cracroft-Eley	31 March 1995 – 29 August 2008	Elizabeth II 1952–2023
	Anthony Worth	30 August 2008 – 22 February 2015	Elizabeth II 1952–2023
	Toby Dennis	23 February 2015 – present	Elizabeth II 1952–2023
	Toby Dennis	23 February 2015 – present	Charles III

== List of Vice Lord-Lieutenants of Lincolnshire ==
The lord-lieutenant selects one of his or her deputy lieutenants to act as the vice lord-lieutenant. This office is not automatically renewed on the appointment of a new lord-lieutenant.

- 1964–1991: John Pelham, 7th Earl of Yarborough

The current Vice Lord-Lieutenant is Andrew Clark.

== List of Deputy Lieutenants ==
A deputy lieutenant of Lincolnshire is commissioned by the Lord Lieutenant of Lincolnshire. Deputy lieutenants support the work of the lord-lieutenant. There can be several deputy lieutenants at any time, depending on the population of the county. Their appointment does not terminate with the changing of the lord-lieutenant, but they usually retire at age 75.

=== 18th century ===
- 12 December 1798: Henry Hutton
- 4 September 1799: James Conington
- 5 September 1799: Joseph Livesey

=== 19th century ===
- 4 May 1813: Henry Smith

== Current Deputy Lieutenants ==
The current Deputy Lieutenants for Lincolnshire are:

- J. M. Ashton
- A. E. Baxter
- Lady Benton Jones
- N. D. S. Brown
- J. B. Burke
- C. E. Carlbom Flinn
- D. C. Chambers
- A. S. Clark
- A. C. Coltman
- R. J. Douglas
- H. C. Drake
- F. J. F. M. Dymoke
- D. K. Harris
- J. G. A. M. Hughes}
- P. G. Keeling
- U. F. R. Lidbetter
- J. W. Lockwood
- B. Marsh
- N. E. McCorquodale
- R. M. Parker
- Air Chief Marshal The Lord Peach
- V. M. Pettifer
- C. A. Pinchbeck
- S. A. L. Price
- H. M. L. Reeve
- Professor M. A. Robinson
- S. E. Robinson
- C. G. Rowles Nicholson
- Sir Reginald Sheffield
- Sir Reginald Tyrwhitt
- A. L. Ward
- W. S. Webb
- C. W. H. Welby
