= Battle of Elands River =

The Battle of Elands River may refer to:

- Battle of Elands River (1900), an action fought in August 1900, when a Boer party laid siege to a British supply dump, defended by a predominantly Australian force, at Brakfontein Drift along the Elands River
- Battle of Elands River (1901), also known as the Battle of Moddersfontein, which took place in September 1901
