= Daphne Fielding =

British author (1904–1997)

The Honourable Daphne Fielding
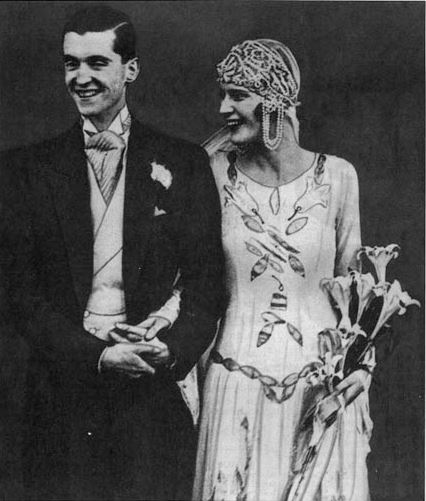
- Pictured in 1927 with Henry Thynne, Viscount Weymouth
- Born: Daphne Winifred Louise Vivian; 11 July 1904; Westminster, London, England
- Died: 5 December 1997 (aged 93)
- Occupation: Author
- Spouses: Henry Thynne, 6th Marquess of Bath (m. 1927; div. 1953) Alexander Fielding (m. 1953; div. 1978)
- Children: Caroline Somerset, Duchess of Beaufort; The Hon. Thomas Thynne; Alexander Thynn, 7th Marquess of Bath; Lord Christopher Thynne; Lord Valentine Thynne
- Parents: George Vivian, 4th Baron Vivian; Barbara Fanning

Daphne Winifred Louise Fielding (née Vivian, formerly Thynne; 11 July 1904 – 5 December 1997) was a British author.

== Early life ==
Daphne Vivian was born on 11 July 1904 in Westminster, London, the elder child of George Vivian, 4th Baron Vivian, and Barbara Cicely (née Fanning). Her younger brother was Anthony Vivian, 5th Baron Vivian. Her parents separated when she was four years old and her father raised the children at Glynn, Cornwall, where the family were known as the 'mad Vivians'. He remarried in 1911 to Nancy Lycett Green (a daughter of Sir Edward Green, 2nd Baronet), with whom he had two more children.

Her paternal grandparents were Hussey Vivian, 3rd Baron Vivian and the former Louisa Alicia Duff (sister of George William Duff-Assheton-Smith of Vaynol, and only daughter of Robert George Duff, of Wellington Lodge, Isle of Wight). Her maternal grandparents were William Atmar Fanning and the former Winifred (née de Bathe) McCalmont (the widow of Harry McCalmont, who was a younger daughter of Sir Henry de Bathe, 4th Baronet).

According to her obituary in The Times, when young, Daphne "once played ring-a-ring-a-roses" with Edward VII.

== Career ==
She was sent to Paris aged 16, and developed a love of opera. Her brother Anthony (later the 5th Baron Vivian) hired her out at Eton to photograph "for a shilling an hour".

She moved into the world of the "Bright Young Things" in the 1920s and produced a series of popular books about high society. She became friends with, among others, Tallulah Bankhead, Harold Acton and Evelyn Waugh (who dedicated his 1957 novel The Ordeal of Gilbert Pinfold to her).

Her best known book was The Duchess of Jermyn Street (1964), which was loosely adapted by the BBC into The Duchess of Duke Street (but without formally crediting Fielding).

Of Fielding's memoirs, Mercury Presides, Waugh wrote: "Daphne has written her memoirs. Contrary to what one would have expected they are marred by discretion and good taste. The childhood part is admirable. The adult part is rather as though Lord Montgomery were to write his life and omit to mention that he ever served in the army."

== Personal life ==
On 27 October 1927 she married Henry Thynne, Viscount Weymouth, who became the 6th Marquess of Bath in 1946. Neither his nor her parents approved of the marriage, and they were divorced in 1953. From 1946, she was known as the Marchioness of Bath. The couple had five children:

- Lady Caroline Jane Thynne (1928–1995); married David Somerset, 11th Duke of Beaufort.
- The Honourable Thomas Timothy Thynne (1929–1930); died in infancy.
- Alexander George Thynn, 7th Marquess of Bath (1932–2020); married Anna Gyarmathy.
- Lord Christopher John Thynne (1934–2017); married Antonia Palmer, daughter of Sir Anthony Palmer, 4th Baronet.
- Lord Valentine Charles Thynne (1937–1979); married, first, Veronica Jacks and had issue. He married, secondly, Susanne Alder; and, thirdly, Liese Dennis.

After her divorce, her first husband, Viscount Weymouth, married Virginia Penelope (née Parsons) Tennant (following her divorce from David Tennant). Daphne remarried to Major Alexander Wallace Fielding, son of Alexander Lumsden Wallace, of Kirkcaldy, on 11 July 1953. Due to financial problems, the couple moved to Tangier and Portugal before moving to Languedoc in France. The couple divorced in 1978. She later lived with American millionaire Ben Kittridge in Arizona, before returning to Gloucestershire after his death.

Fielding died on 5 December 1997.

== Works ==
- Longleat from 1566 to the present time. Longleat Estate (1949)
- Before the Sunset Fades. Longleat Estate (1951)
- Mercury Presides. London: Eyre & Spottiswoode (1954)
- The Adonis Garden (1961)
- The Duchess of Jermyn Street: Rosa Lewis. London: Eyre & Spottiswoode (1964) ISBN 0-413-25190-X
- Emerald and Nancy: Lady Cunard and Her Daughter. London: Eyre & Spottiswoode (1968) ISBN 0-413-25950-1
- The Nearest Way Home. London: Eyre & Spottiswoode (1970)
- The Rainbow Picnic: A Portrait of Iris Tree. London: Eyre Methuen (1974) ISBN 0-413-28520-0
- The Face on the Sphinx: A Portrait of Gladys Marie Deacon, Duchess of Marlborough. London: Hamish Hamilton (1978) ISBN 0-241-89314-3
