= William Conyers, 1st Baron Conyers =

English aristocrat (1468–1524)

- Baron Conyers
- Tenure: 17 October 1509 - 14 April 1524
- Successor: Christopher Conyers, 2nd Baron Conyers
- Born: 21 December 1468; Settrington, Yorkshire, England.
- Died: 14 April 1524 (aged 55); Hornby Castle, Yorkshire, England.
- Residence: Hornby Castle
- Spouses: Mary Scrope; Lady Anne Neville; Maud Percy
- Issue: Christopher Conyers, 2nd Baron Conyers; Katherine Conyers, Lady Bigod
- Parents: Sir John Conyers, Jr. Lady Alice Neville

William Conyers, 1st Baron Conyers (21 December 1468 – 14 April 1524), also known as William Conyers of Hornby, was an English baron and aristocrat.

== Personal life ==
Conyers was the second, but only surviving son of Sir John Conyers Jr. (d.1469) of Hornby, Yorkshire, and Lady Alice Neville, daughter of William Neville, 1st Earl of Kent. His father, having been killed in battle when he was under a year old, Conyers thus succeeded to the family estates on the death of his grandfather, Sir John Conyers, on 14 March 1489/90. He extensively rebuilt Hornby Castle in Swaledale, Yorkshire, which Conyers had inherited. His first wife was Mary Scrope, the daughter of Sir John Scrope, 5th Baron Scrope of Bolton, and Elizabeth St John, and the half-cousin of King Henry VII of England, through her maternal grandmother, Margaret Beauchamp of Bletso. His second wife was Lady Anne Neville, daughter of Ralph Neville, 3rd Earl of Westmorland, and Isabel Booth. Another wife, though where she fits is unknown, was apparently Maud Percy, youngest daughter of the 5th Earl of Northumberland

He served the King on several military expeditions to Scotland, and also fought at the Battle of Flodden in 1513.

== Titles ==
Conyers was created Baron Conyers on 17 October 1509. He was succeeded by Christopher Conyers, 2nd Baron Conyers, one of his sons by Lady Anne Neville. His daughter, Katherine Conyers (d. 1566), married Sir Francis Bigod.

== Ancestry ==
Ancestors of William Conyers, 1st Baron Conyers

16. John Conyers of Hornby
8. Sir Christopher Conyers of Hornby
17. Margaret St. Quintin
4. Sir John Conyers of Hornby
18. Thomas de Rolleston
9. Ellen de Rolleston
2. Sir John Conyers of Hornby
20. John Darcy, 5th Baron Darcy de Knayth
10. Philip Darcy, 6th Baron Darcy de Knayth
21. Margaret Grey
5. Margaret Darcy
22. Henry FitzHugh, 3rd Baron FitzHugh
11. Eleanor FitzHugh
23. Elizabeth Grey
1. William Conyers of Hornby, 1st Baron Conyers
24. John Neville, 3rd Baron Neville de Raby
12. Ralph de Neville, 1st Earl of Westmorland
25. Maud de Percy
6. William Neville, 1st Earl of Kent
26. John of Gaunt, 1st Duke of Lancaster
13. Joan Beaufort, Countess of Westmorland
27. Katherine Roet
3. Lady Alice Neville
28. Walter de Fauconberg, 4th Baron Fauconberg
14. Thomas de Fauconberg, 5th Baron Fauconberg
29. Maud de Pateshulle
7. Joan de Fauconberg
30. Thomas de Bromflete
15. Joan Bromflete
31. Margaret St. John

== Notes ==
Peerage of England
New creation	Baron Conyers; 1509–1524	Succeeded by Christopher Conyers
