= Sackville Lane-Fox, 12th Baron Conyers =

British peer and soldier

The Right Honourable Lord Conyers

Personal details
- Born: Sackville George Lane-Fox; 14 September 1827
- Died: 24 August 1888 (aged 60)
- Spouse: Mary Curteis (m. 1860)
- Relations: Charles Pelham, Lord Worsley (grandson); Sackville Pelham, 5th Earl of Yarborough (grandson); James Fox-Lane (grandfather); George Osborne, 6th Duke of Leeds (grandfather)
- Children: Sackville FitzRoy Henry Lane-Fox; Marcia Pelham, Countess of Yarborough; Violet Herbert, Countess of Powis
- Parent(s): Lady Charlotte Osborne; Sackville Lane-Fox

Sackville George Lane-Fox, 12th Baron Conyers and de jure 15th Baron Darcy de Knayth (14 September 1827 – 24 August 1888) was a British peer and soldier.

== Early life ==
Lane-Fox was the eldest son of Lady Charlotte Osborne (d. 1836) and Sackville Lane-Fox (1797–1874), a British Conservative Party politician. His younger brother, Charles Pierrepont Darcy Lane-Fox, was wounded at the Battle of Alma while an officer in the Crimean War.

His father was the third son of James Fox-Lane of Bramham Park and Hon. Marcia Lucy Pitt (third daughter George Pitt, 1st Baron Rivers). His grandfather was a Member of Parliament for Horsham and through his uncle William Lane-Fox and his wife, Lady Caroline Douglas (sister of George Douglas, 17th Earl of Morton), he was a first cousin of Augustus Pitt Rivers. His mother was the only childhood-surviving daughter of the George Osborne, 6th Duke of Leeds and Lady Charlotte Townshend (eldest daughter of George Townshend, 1st Marquess Townshend). His maternal uncle was Francis D'Arcy-Osborne, 7th Duke of Leeds.

== Career ==
On 7 August 1846, he became a cornet by purchase in the Royal Horse Guards and exchanged to the 13th Light Dragoons on 28 December 1849. He retired from the regiment in April 1850.

He returned to the Army after the outbreak of the Crimean War. On 29 December 1854, he was commissioned an ensign in the 21st Regiment of Foot. Lane-Fox served with the regiment at the Siege of Sevastopol, for which he later received the medal and clasp. He exchanged as a lieutenant into the 87th Regiment of Foot on 22 July 1856 and retired from the regiment around June 1859.

He was appointed a cornet in the Yorkshire Hussars on 24 May 1861, but retired from the regiment in September and became a lieutenant in the Royal East Kent Yeomanry on 19 May 1863.

=== Titles and estates ===
In 1859, Lane-Fox had inherited the Portuguese countship of Mértola and the baronies of Darcy de Knayth and Conyers from his maternal uncle (who died childless) the 7th Duke of Leeds. The Dukedom was inherited by the 7th Duke's cousin, George Osborne (son of Lord Francis Osborne, his grandfather's younger brother).

== Personal life ==
On 14 August 1860, Lord Conyers married Mary Curteis, daughter of Capt. Reginald Curteis and the former Frances Mary Reynolds (eldest daughter of Lawrence Reynolds of Paxton Hall). Together, they had three children:

- The Hon. Sackville FitzRoy Henry (1861–1879), who died unmarried.
- The Hon. Marcia Amelia Mary (1863–1926), who married Charles Pelham, 4th Earl of Yarborough.
- The Hon. Violet Ida Evelyn (1865–1929), who married George Herbert, 4th Earl of Powis.

On Lord Conyers' death in 1888 his English baronies became abeyant between his two daughters; the barony of Conyers became granted to Marcia in 1892, and that of Darcy de Knayth became granted to his other daughter, Violet in 1903. His Portuguese countship passed to Marcia with immediate effect. His widow, Lady Conyers, died on 12 November 1921.

Portuguese nobility
Preceded by Francis D'Arcy-Osborne	Count of Mértola; 1859–1888	Succeeded by Marcia Pelham
Peerage of England
Preceded by Francis D'Arcy-Osborne	Baron Conyers; 1859–1888	In abeyance Title next held by Marcia Pelham
Preceded by Francis D'Arcy-Osborne	Baron Darcy de Knayth; 1859–1888	In abeyance Title next held by Violet Herbert
