= Charles Pelham, 4th Earl of Yarborough =

British peer & politician (1859–1936)

The Right Honourable The Earl of Yarborough KG PC
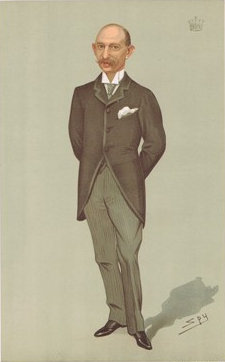
- "Brocklesby". The Earl of Yarborough as caricatured by Spy (Leslie Ward) in Vanity Fair, January 1896.

Captain of the Honourable Corps of Gentlemen-at-Arms
- In office 11 August 1890 – 11 August 1892
- Monarch: Victoria
- Prime Minister: The Marquess of Salisbury
- Preceded by: The Earl of Rosslyn
- Succeeded by: The Lord Vernon

Personal details
- Born: 11 June 1859
- Died: 12 July 1936 (aged 77)
- Party: Liberal; Conservative
- Spouse: Marcia Lane-Fox
- Education: Trinity College, Cambridge

Charles Alfred Worsley Pelham, 4th Earl of Yarborough (11 June 1859 – 12 July 1936), styled Lord Worsley until 1875, was a British peer and politician. Between 1890 and 1892, he served as Captain of the Honourable Corps of Gentlemen-at-Arms, meaning as Chief Whip in the House of Lords, for the Conservative government of Lord Salisbury.

== Background and education ==
Pelham was the eldest son of Charles Anderson-Pelham, 3rd Earl of Yarborough, and his wife, Lady Victoria Alexandrina Hare, daughter of William Hare, 2nd Earl of Listowel. He was educated at Eton and Trinity College, Cambridge. He originally used the surname Anderson-Pelham, but assumed by Royal licence the surname of Pelham only in 1905.

== Political career ==
When Yarborough inherited his father's titles in 1875, he took up his seat in the Lords as a Liberal but later became a Conservative over Irish Home Rule. In 1890 he was admitted to the Privy Council and made Captain of the Honourable Corps of Gentlemen-at-Arms under Lord Salisbury, a post he held until 1892.

During the Second Anglo-Boer War a new regiment was formed as the Lincolnshire Imperial Yeomanry, of which Yarborough was appointed Lieutenant-colonel in June 1901 After the war it became a permanent unit as the Lincolnshire Yeomanry. Lord Yarborough was appointed Honorary Colonel of the 3rd (Militia) Battalion of the Lincolnshire Regiment in 1898 and of the 5th Battalion, Lincolnshire Regiment (Territorial Army) in 1922.

In 1921 he was appointed Lord Lieutenant of Lincolnshire, which he remained until his death in 1936. He was made a Knight Companion of the Garter in 1935. Other appointments he held until his death were: Provincial Grand Master of Lincolnshire (Freemasons) from 1895 and Master of the Fox Hounds of Brocklesby from 1880.

== Family ==
Lord Yarborough married Hon. Marcia Lane-Fox, daughter and co-heir of Sackville Lane-Fox, 12th Baron Conyers, on 5 August 1886. They had four sons:

- Charles Pelham, Lord Worsley (1887–1914).
- Sackville Pelham, 5th Earl of Yarborough (1888–1948).
- D'Arcy Francis (b.& d. 1892).
- Marcus Herbert Pelham, 6th Earl of Yarborough (1893–1966).

Lord Yarborough died in July 1936, aged 77, and was succeeded by his second but eldest surviving son, Sackville.

== Coat of arms ==
Coat of arms of Charles Pelham, 4th Earl of Yarborough
| Coronet A coronet of an Earl Crest A peacock in pride argent. Escutcheon Quarterly: 1st and 4th azure, three pelicans vulning themselves argent; 2nd and 3rd gules, two pieces of belts with buckles, erect in pale, the buckles upwards argent. Supporters Dexter: a bay-horse, regardant, charged on the body with three antique buckles, in bend sinister or; sinister, a water-spaniel dog, regardant, or, charged on the body with three crosses-flory in bend sable. Motto Vincit amor patriae (The love of my country will prevail). |

Political offices
| Preceded by The Earl of Rosslyn | Captain of the Honourable Corps of Gentlemen-at-Arms; 1890–1892 | Succeeded by The Lord Vernon |
Honorary titles
| Preceded by The Earl Brownlow | Lord-Lieutenant of Lincolnshire; 1921–1936 | Succeeded by The Lord Brownlow |
Peerage of the United Kingdom
| Preceded by Charles Anderson-Pelham | Earl of Yarborough; 1875–1936 | Succeeded by Sackville Pelham |
