= Marcus Pelham, 6th Earl of Yarborough =

Marcus Herbert Pelham, 6th Earl of Yarborough (30 June 1893 – 2 December 1966) was a British peer, a member of the House of Lords from 1966 until his death. Before that he was known by the courtesy title of Lord Worsley.

A younger son of the 4th Earl of Yarborough, he was educated at Eton College and Trinity College, Cambridge.

Commissioned into the Lincolnshire Yeomanry and later transferring to the First Life Guards, he saw active service in France from 1916 to 1918, during the First World War. He then took a Diploma in Agriculture at Oxford. During the Second World War, he returned to the army.

In 1948, he succeeded his brother Sackville Pelham, 5th Earl of Yarborough, as Earl of Yarborough, Baron Yarborough, and Baron Worsley, taking his seat in the House of Lords and residing at Brocklesby Park.

In 1919, Pelham married Pamela Douglas Pennant, and they had one son and one daughter.

His recreations were hunting and shooting, and he was a member of the Cavalry Club and Buck's.

== Notes ==
Peerage of the United Kingdom
Preceded by Sackville George Pelham	Earl of Yarborough; 1948–1966	Succeeded by John Edward Pelham
