= Earl of Yarborough =

Earldom in the Peerage of the United Kingdom

Earldom of Yarborough
- Blazon: Arms: Quarterly: 1st & 4th, Azure, three Pelicans Argent, vulning themselves proper (Pelham); 2nd & 3rd, Gules, two broken Belts palewise, the buckles upwards Argent (Pelham).; Crest: A Peacock in his pride Argent.; Supporters: Dexter: A Bay Horse reguardant charged on the body with three Antique Buckles in bend sinister Or. Sinister: A Water Spaniel Dog reguardant Or, charged on the body with three Crosses-flory in bend Sable.
- Creation date: 30 January 1837
- Created by: William IV
- Peerage: Peerage of the United Kingdom
- First holder: Charles Anderson-Pelham, 2nd Baron Yarborough
- Present holder: Charles Pelham, 8th Earl of Yarborough
- Heir apparent: George Pelham, Lord Worsley
- Remainder to: the 1st Earl’s heirs male of the body lawfully begotten
- Subsidiary titles: Baron Yarborough; Baron Worsley
- Status: Extant
- Motto: VINCIT AMOR PATRIÆ (The love of my country prevails)
- The shield in the arms of the Earl of Yarborough is the same as that of the Earl of Chichester

Earl of Yarborough is a title in the Peerage of the United Kingdom. It was created in 1837 for Charles Anderson-Pelham, 2nd Baron Yarborough.

== History ==
Arms of Anderson-Pelham: Quarterly; 1st and 4th grand quarters, quarterly, 1st and 4th azure, three pelicans argent, vulning themselves; 2nd and 3rd gules, two pieces of belts, with buckles erect in pale, the buckles upwards argent (Pelham); 2nd and 3rd grand quarters argent, a chevron between three crosses-flory sable (Anderson).

The Anderson-Pelham family descends from Francis Anderson of Manby, Lincolnshire. He married Mary, daughter of Charles Pelham of Brocklesby, Lincolnshire. Their grandson Charles Anderson assumed the additional surname of Pelham and represented Beverley and Lincolnshire in the House of Commons. In 1794 he was created Baron Yarborough, of Yarborough in the County of Lincoln, in the Peerage of Great Britain.

He was succeeded by his son, the second Baron. He sat as Member of Parliament for Great Grimsby and for Lincolnshire. Lord Yarborough married Henrietta Anne Maria Charlotte Bridgeman Simpson (d. 1813), daughter of John Simpson and Henrietta Francis Worsley, daughter of Sir Thomas Worsley, 6th Baronet, of Appuldurcombe (a title which became extinct in 1825; see Worsley baronets). Through this marriage Appuldurcombe House on the Isle of Wight, which had previously been in the Worsley family, came into the Anderson-Pelham family (however, it was sold in 1855). In 1837 Yarborough was created Baron Worsley, of Appuldurcombe on the Isle of Wight, and Earl of Yarborough, in the Peerage of the United Kingdom. He was succeeded by his son, the second Earl. He represented Newport, Isle of Wight, Lincolnshire and North Lincolnshire in Parliament and served as Lord Lieutenant of Lincolnshire. Lord Yarborough is also remembered for giving his name to the bridge term the "Yarborough hand". His son, the third Earl, was Member of Parliament for Great Grimsby.

On his early death the titles passed to his son, the fourth Earl. He held office in the second Conservative administration of Lord Salisbury as Captain of the Honourable Corps of Gentlemen-at-Arms from 1890 to 1892 and was also Lord Lieutenant of Lincolnshire. In 1905 he assumed by Royal licence for himself and issue the surname and arms of Pelham only in 1905. Lord Yarborough married Marcia Lane-Fox, daughter of Sackville George Lane-Fox, 15th Baron Darcy de Knayth and 12th Baron Conyers. The baronies of Darcy de Knayth and Conyers fell into abeyance on the latter's death in 1888. However, in 1892 the barony of Conyers was called out of abeyance in favour of Marcia, who became the thirteenth Baroness Conyers in her own right. In 1903 the ancient barony of Fauconberg, which had been in abeyance since 1463, was also called out in her favour and she became the seventh Baroness Fauconberg as well.

Both Lord and Lady Yarborough were succeeded in their respective titles by their second but eldest surviving son, the fifth Earl. He had no sons and on his death in 1948 the baronies of Conyers and Fauconberg fell into abeyance between his two daughters Lady Diana Mary and Lady June Wendy; they remained so until the death of Lady June Wendy in 2012. He was succeeded in the other titles by his younger brother, the sixth Earl. As of 2009 the peerages are held by the latter's grandson, the eighth Earl, who succeeded his father in 1991.

Caistor Yarborough School in Caistor, Lincolnshire was named in memorial to John Edward Pelham, 7th Earl of Yarborough and is located less than a mile away from the Brocklesby House estate. A number of public places, roads and buildings in Lincolnshire are named after the Yarborough title, particularly in Grimsby, where the family were particularly prominent political figures. One of the most well known sites is the Yarborough Hotel, built in 1851 and now a pub owned by J. D. Wetherspoon. There was also an area in Grimsby called Yarborough, until it was absorbed into the conurbation of Grimsby & Cleethorpes and there continues to be a Yarborough Estate in the town, which is currently undergoing extensive re-development.

Another member of this family was Sir Stephen Anderson, 1st Baronet, of Eyworth. He was the brother of Francis Anderson, grandfather of the first Baron Yarborough. Dudley Pelham, younger son of the first Earl, was a naval commander and politician.

The family crest has been adopted by HMS Brocklesby, which is named after the Brocklesby Hunt.

The Yarborough Monument on Bembridge Down commissioned by the Royal Yacht Squadron commemorates his life and is both a sea mark and the highest monument on the Isle of Wight at 75 ft.

The family seat is Brocklesby Hall, near Immingham, Lincolnshire.

== Barons Yarborough (1794) ==
- Charles Anderson-Pelham, 1st Baron Yarborough (1749–1823)
- Charles Anderson-Pelham, 2nd Baron Yarborough (1781–1846) (created Earl of Yarborough in 1837)

== Earls of Yarborough (1837) ==
- Charles Anderson-Pelham, 1st Earl of Yarborough (1781–1846)
- Charles Anderson Worsley Anderson-Pelham, 2nd Earl of Yarborough (1809–1862)
- Charles Anderson-Pelham, 3rd Earl of Yarborough (1835–1875)
- Charles Alfred Worsley Pelham, 4th Earl of Yarborough (1859–1936)
- Sackville George Pelham, 5th Earl of Yarborough (1888–1948)
- Marcus Herbert Pelham, 6th Earl of Yarborough (1893–1966)
- John Edward Pelham, 7th Earl of Yarborough (1920–1991)
- Charles John Pelham, 8th Earl of Yarborough (b. 1963)

The heir apparent is the present holder's son, George John Sackville Pelham, Lord Worsley (b. 1990).

== See also ==
- Baron Conyers
- Baron Fauconberg
- Anderson baronets of Eyworth
- Worsley baronets, of Appuldurcombe
- Charles Pelham, Lord Worsley (son of Charles Alfred Worsley Pelham, 4th Earl of Yarborough, killed in action in World War I)
