= Charles Anderson-Pelham, 2nd Earl of Yarborough =

British nobleman

Charles Anderson Worsley Anderson-Pelham, 2nd Earl of Yarborough (12 April 1809 – 7 January 1862) was a British nobleman who succeeded to the Earldom of Yarborough in 1846.

Before his accession, he was the Member of Parliament (MP) for Newtown 1830–1831, Lincolnshire 1831–1832 and North Lincolnshire 1835–1846.

Lord Yarborough gave his name to a hand of cards dealt in contract bridge that has no card higher than a nine (see Yarborough). The probability of getting a Yarborough is $\frac{\binom{32}{13}}{\binom{52}{13}}$ which is $\frac{347,373,600}{635,013,559,600}$ or about $\frac{1}{1828}$. The Earl offered £1,000 to anyone who achieved a "Yarborough" – on condition they paid him £1 each time they did not succeed!

Coat of arms of Charles Anderson-Pelham, 2nd Earl of Yarborough
Coronet A coronet of an Earl Crest 1st, a peacock in pride, argent (Pelham); 2nd, a water-spaniel dog, or (Anderson). Escutcheon Quarterly; 1st and 4th grand quarters, quarterly, 1st and 4th azure, three pelicans argent, vulning themselves; 2nd and 3rd gules, two pieces of belts, with buckles erect in pale, the buckles upwards argent (Pelham); 2nd and 3rd grand quarters argent, a chevron between three crosses-flory sable (Anderson). Supporters Dexter: a bay-horse, regardant, charged on the body with three antique buckles, in bend sinister or; sinister, a water-spaniel dog, regardant, or, charged on the body with three crosses-flory in bend sable. Motto Vincit amor patriae

Parliament of the United Kingdom
Preceded by Hudson Gurney; Charles Compton Cavendish	Member of Parliament for Newtown; 1830–1831; With: Hudson Gurney	Succeeded by Hudson Gurney; Sir William Horne
Preceded by Charles Chaplin; Sir William Amcotts-Ingilby, Bt	Member of Parliament for Lincolnshire; 1831–1832; With: Sir William Amcotts-Ingilby, Bt	Constituency abolished
New constituency	Member of Parliament for North Lincolnshire; 1832–1847; With: Sir William Amcotts-Ingilby, Bt 1832–1835; Thomas George Corbett 1835–1837; Robert Adam Christopher 1837–1847	Succeeded by Robert Adam Christopher; Sir Montague Cholmeley, Bt
Honorary titles
Preceded by The Earl Brownlow	Vice-Admiral of Lincolnshire; 1853–1862	Vacant
Preceded by Marquess of Granby	Lord Lieutenant of Lincolnshire; 1857–1862	Succeeded by The Lord Aveland
Peerage of the United Kingdom
Preceded by Charles Anderson-Pelham	Earl of Yarborough; 1846–1862	Succeeded by Charles Anderson-Pelham
