= Nicholas Vivian, 6th Baron Vivian =

British peer and soldier (1935-2004)

Brigadier The Right Honourable The Lord Vivian

Member of the House of Lords
- Lord Temporal
- Hereditary peerage 24 September 1991 – 11 November 1999
- Preceded by: The 5th Baron Vivian
- Succeeded by: Seat abolished
- Elected Hereditary Peer; 11 November 1999 – 28 February 2004
- Election: 1999
- Preceded by: Seat established
- Succeeded by: The 3rd Viscount Trenchard

Personal details
- Born: Nicholas Crespigny Laurence Vivian; 11 December 1935
- Died: 28 February 2004 (aged 68)
- Party: Conservative
- Spouses: Catherine Joyce Hope (m. 1960; div. 1972) Carol Martineau (m. 1972)
- Education: Madrid University

Brigadier Nicholas Crespigny Laurence Vivian, 6th Baron Vivian (11 December 1935 – 28 February 2004), was a British peer and soldier from the Vivian family. He was one of the hereditary peers elected to remain in the House of Lords after the passing of the House of Lords Act 1999, sitting as a Conservative.

== Early life ==
The son of the 5th Baron Vivian and Victoria Ruth Mary Rosamund (née Oliphant), Nicholas was educated at Ludgrove School, then at Eton College in Berkshire and Madrid University, where he received a diploma in Spanish Literature, History and Culture.

== Biography ==
=== Military career ===
In 1955, Vivian was commissioned to the 3rd Carabiniers (Army Emergency Reserve), which later merged with the Royal Scots Greys into the Royal Scots Dragoon Guards.

In 1957 he transferred to a Regular Army commission. From 1976, he commanded the 16th/5th The Queen's Royal Lancers. Having then worked for defence intelligence staff at the UK Ministry of Defence, Vivian became deputy commander of the land forces in Cyprus in 1984. Elevated to the rank of brigadier in 1987, he commanded the British Communication Zone until 1990, when he stepped down. Shortly after this, he was promoted Honorary Colonel of 306 Field Hospital, Territorial Army.

=== Political career ===
In 1991, Vivian succeeded to his father's titles and joined the House of Lords, where he was Shadow Minister for Defence. Between 1994 and 2000, he was Commissioner for the Royal Hospital, Chelsea.

== Personal life ==
Vivian married firstly Catherine Joyce Hope, daughter of James Kenneth Hope, on 13 December 1960. Being divorced in 1972, he married secondly Carol Martineau (1939–2013), daughter of Frederick Alan Martineau, in 1972.

He had one son, Charles (now 7th Baron Vivian) and one daughter, Henrietta (married to Philip Hoyland. Children: Jack, Francesca, George), by his first wife, and two daughters by his second wife, Natasha (married to Jamie Piggott. Children: Harry, Jemima, Olivia, Florence) and Camilla (married to William Wallace. Children: Agatha, George).

Peerage of the United Kingdom
Preceded by Anthony Vivian	Baron Vivian; 1991–2004; Member of the House of Lords (1991–1999)	Succeeded by Charles Vivian
Parliament of the United Kingdom
New office created by the House of Lords Act 1999	Elected hereditary peer to the House of Lords under the House of Lords Act 1999; 1999–2004	Succeeded by The Viscount Trenchard
