= John Conyers, 3rd Baron Conyers =

English noble

John Conyers, 3rd Baron Conyers (c. 1524 – 13 June 1557) was an English peer and military administrator.

== Biography ==
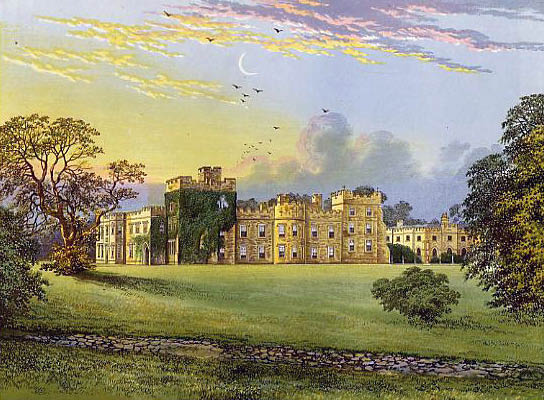
Hornby Castle c.1880

Conyers was born the son of Christopher Conyers, 2nd Baron Conyers circa 1524.

He was knighted in 1544. In 1551 he was made Warden of the Western March and Governor of Carlisle under King Edward VI, and in 1553 he was made Warden of the Eastern March and Governor of Berwick under Queen Mary I.

In June 1554 he wrote from Berwick-upon-Tweed with news that Mary of Guise intended to visit the eastern border of Scotland to hold justice courts. He made preparations in case there was an invasion.

A memorial tablet to a relative at Dodderhill in Worcestershire mentions that he was "Captain of the king's life-guard of horse and Governor of Berwick".

== Private life ==
He married Lady Maud Clifford, daughter of the Earl of Cumberland and had four daughters of whom three were his co-heiresses. Elizabeth married Thomas Darcy. Katherine married John Atherton. Anne married Anthony Kempe, of Slindon, Sussex. Margaret died unmarried.

Conyers inherited the title of Baron Conyers and the family seat of Hornby Castle, North Yorkshire upon his father's death in 1538. His wife thus became Lady Conyers. However, since Lord Conyers did not produce a male heir, the title Baron Conyers fell into abeyance upon his death in 1557. Hornby Castle descended to Conyers Darcy, the son of his daughter Elizabeth, his only daughter to have children. The baronetcy was later brought out of abeyance by his grandson some time between 1641 and 1644.

Peerage of England
Preceded by Christopher Conyers	Baron Conyers; 1538–1557	Abeyant
