= Sackville Pelham, 5th Earl of Yarborough =

British peer and soldier

Sackville Pelham
- Born: 17 December 1888
- Died: 7 February 1948 (aged 59)
- Spouse: Nancye Brocklehurst (m. 1919)
- Children: 2, including Diana
- Parent(s): Charles and Marcia Pelham
- Relatives: Charles Pelham (brother)
- Military career
- Rank: Major
- Units: 11th Hussars; Sherwood Rangers Yeomanry
- Conflicts: World War I World War II
- Awards: Military Cross

Sackville George Pelham, 5th Earl of Yarborough, MC (17 December 1888 – 7 February 1948), styled Lord Worsley from 1914 to 1926 and known as the Lord Conyers from 1926 until his accession to the earldom in 1936, was a British peer and soldier.

== Biography ==
Pelham was the second son of Charles Pelham, 4th Earl of Yarborough and his wife, Marcia. In 1910, he became a Second Lieutenant in the 11th Hussars and initially fought as a lieutenant in France during World War I before being promoted to the rank of captain in 1916. During the war, his elder brother, Charles was killed in action and Sackville assumed the former's courtesy title of Lord Worsley. After the war, he was awarded the Military Cross and retired from the Army in 1919 when he married Nancye Brocklehurst (a niece of Lord Ranksborough). The couple had two daughters, Diana Mary who became Diana Miller, 11th Countess of Mértola (1920-2013) and (June) Wendy who married Michael Hildesley Lycett (1924-2012).

In 1926, Lord Worsley became a major in the Sherwood Rangers Yeomanry and on the death of his mother that year, inherited the baronies of Conyers and Fauconberg and the Portuguese countship of Mértola. He later inherited the earldom of Yarborough from his father in 1936.

From 1936 to 1940 the earl commanded the Sherwood Rangers Yeomanry as a Lieutenant Colonel and fought in World War II from 1939 to 1944. Together with his wife, he was a survivor of the aerial bomber bombardment of the RMS Empress of Britain in October 1940 (and later sinking under tow) in which 45 were killed off Ireland. On his death in 1948, the earldom, Brocklesby Hall and a moderately large area of farmland passed to his brother, Marcus, whilst the countship passed to his eldest daughter, Lady Diana, and the baronies went into abeyance between his two daughters. The death of his youngest daughter in 2012 terminated that in favour of Diana, who thus succeeded him in the baronies.

== Coat of arms ==
Coat of arms of Sackville Pelham, 5th Earl of Yarborough
Coronet A coronet of an Earl Crest A peacock in pride argent. Escutcheon Quarterly: 1st and 4th azure, three pelicans vulning themselves argent; 2nd and 3rd gules, two pieces of belts with buckles, erect in pale, the buckles upwards argent. Supporters Dexter: a bay-horse, regardant, charged on the body with three antique buckles, in bend sinister or; sinister, a water-spaniel dog, regardant, or, charged on the body with three crosses-flory in bend sable. Motto Vincit amor patriae (The love of my country will prevail).

Peerage of the United Kingdom
Preceded by Charles Alfred Worsley Pelham	Earl of Yarborough; 1936 – 1948	Succeeded by Marcus Herbert Pelham
Peerage of England
Preceded by Marcia Pelham	Baron Conyers; 1926 – 1948	Succeeded by Diana Miller in abeyance 1948-2012
Preceded by Marcia Pelham	Baron Fauconberg; 1926 – 1948	Succeeded by Diana Miller in abeyance 1948-2012
Portuguese nobility
Preceded by Marcia Pelham	Count of Mértola; 1926 – 1948	Succeeded by Diana Miller
