= Count of Mértola =

Noble Titles of Portugal
Dukedoms of Portugal
Marquisates of Portugal
Countships of Portugal
Viscountcies of Portugal
Baronies of Portugal

The title Count of Mértola (Portuguese: Conde de Mértola) was granted to Frederick, 1st Duke of Schomberg by Afonso VI of Portugal, in 1663, as a reward for the Duke's service with the Portuguese Army.

The countship of Mértola was created with remainder to females, and since 1903 has been held by the Barons Fauconberg and Conyers.

== Counts of Mértola (1663) ==
- Frederick Schomberg, 1st Duke of Schomberg, 1st Count of Mértola (1615-1690)
- Meinhardt Schomberg, 3rd Duke of Schomberg, 2nd Count of Mértola (1641-1719)
- Frederica Darcy, Countess FitzWalter, 3rd Countess of Mértola (1688-1751)
- Robert Darcy, 4th Earl of Holderness, 4th Count of Mértola (1718-1778)
- Amelia Osborne, Marchioness of Carmarthen, 5th Countess of Mértola (1754-1784)
- George Osborne, 6th Duke of Leeds, 6th Count of Mértola (1775-1838)
- Francis D'Arcy-Osborne, 7th Duke of Leeds, 7th Count of Mértola (1798-1859)
- Sackville Lane-Fox, 12th Baron Conyers, 8th Count of Mértola (1827-1888)
- Marcia Pelham, Countess Yarborough, 9th Countess of Mértola (1863-1926)
- Sackville Pelham, 5th Earl of Yarborough, 10th Count of Mértola (1888-1948)
- Lady Diana Miller, 15th Baroness Conyers and 9th Baroness Fauconberg, 11th Countess of Mértola (1920-2013)
- Hon. Anthea Lycett, 12th Countess of Mértola (born 1954)

== Line of succession ==
- Diana Miller, 11th Countess of Mértola (1920–2013)
  - Hon. Anthea Lycett, 12th Countess of Mértola (born 1954, adopted by her maternal aunt Lady Wendy Lycett [née Pelham] and husband Major Michael Lycett)
  - (1) Hon. Beatrix Miller (born 1955)
    - (2) Guy Armstrong (born 1996)
    - (3) Matthew Armstrong (born 1998)

== See also ==
- Baron Fauconberg
- List of countships in Portugal
