= Christopher Conyers, 2nd Baron Conyers =

English aristocrat

Christopher Conyers, 2nd Baron Conyers (c. 1491 – 14 June 1538) was an English baron and aristocrat, the son of William Conyers, 1st Baron Conyers.

== Early life and family ==
Christopher was born around 1491, at Hornby Castle, in Yorkshire, England. He was the son of William Conyers, 1st Baron Conyers and Lady Anne Neville (born around 1476). Lady Anne Neville was the only daughter of Ralph Neville, 3rd Earl of Westmorland. After William had died, she married Anthony Saltmarsh around April 1525.

== Marriage and children ==
Conyers married Anne Dacre, daughter of Thomas Dacre, 2nd Baron Dacre of Gilsland, on 28 September 1514. Their eldest son and heir was John Conyers; later The Hon. John Conyers.

== Titles ==
Christopher inherited the title Baron Conyers upon his father's death in 1524, with his wife becoming Lady Conyers and his son The Hon. John Conyers. Christopher died on 14 June 1538.

Peerage of England
Preceded by William Conyers	Baron Conyers; 1524–1538	Succeeded by John Conyers
