= Anthony Vivian, 5th Baron Vivian =

British impresario-restaurateur (1906–1991)

Anthony Vivian

Member of the House of Lords
- In office 28 December 1940 - 24 June 1991

Personal details
- Born: 4 March 1906
- Died: 24 June 1991 (aged 85)
- Spouse: Victoria Oliphant (m. 1930; died 1985)
- Children: 3, including Nicholas
- Parent: George Vivian (father)
- Relatives: Vivian family Daphne Fielding (sister)

Anthony Crespigny Claude Vivian, 5th Baron Vivian (4 March 1906 – 24 June 1991) was a British impresario-restaurateur from the Vivian family who came to public notice in 1954 when he was shot in the abdomen by Mavis Wheeler (née Mabel Winifred Mary Wright, 1908–1970), the former wife of Horace de Vere Cole and of Sir Mortimer Wheeler, and a former mistress of Augustus John.

== Early life ==
Anthony Crespigny Claude Vivian, 5th Baron Vivian was born on 4 March 1906. He was the son of George Crespigny Brabazon Vivian, 4th Baron Vivian and Barbara Fanning, a former Gaiety Girl. He was educated at Eton.

== Career ==
Vivian worked as a farm labourer in Canada and a publicity manager in San Francisco.

He returned to London and became a theatrical and dance band agent. At the outbreak of World War II he enlisted in the Royal Artillery, but was invalided out in 1940, and succeeded to his title.

He became a partner of the impresario C.B. Cochran. Their first production was the musical Bless the Bride, which ran for two-and-a-half years, but two other joint ventures failed. In 1952, he was the producer with John Clements of The Happy Marriage at the Duke of York's Theatre, London. He later had a career in catering.

He was a member of the House of Lords from 28 December 1940 until his death on 24 June 1991. He made 90 speeches there; his first recorded speech was on 13 March 1967 and his last on 4 April 1984.

== Marriage and children ==
Lord Vivian married Victoria Ruth Mary Rosamund Oliphant on 8 March 1930. They had three children:

- Hon Sally Anne Marie Gabrielle Vivian (born 22 September 1930)
- Nicholas Crespigny Laurance Vivian, 6th Baron Vivian (11 December 1935 – 28 February 2004)
- Hon Victor Anthony Ralph Brabazon Vivian (26 March 1940 - 19 July 2013)

== Mavis Wheeler ==
Vivian commanded tabloid headlines in 1954, when his lover, Mavis Wheeler, the former wife of both Sir Mortimer Wheeler and Horace de Vere Cole, and the mistress of Augustus John, was jailed for six months for shooting him in the abdomen. At Wheeler's trial, the prosecuting counsel said that her love for Lord Vivian was overpowering and that she was jealous of any attention he showed to other women. This love, the prosecution claimed, had led her to shoot him, on 30 July 1954, at a range of three inches, with intent to murder him at her country cottage at Potterne, Wiltshire. Giving evidence from his hospital bed in Devizes, Lord Vivian said he was shot while climbing in a window, having lost the key. He said: "I cannot believe now Mrs. Wheeler wanted to kill me. I was always devoted to her and I still am." He and Wheeler lived together in Chelsea, he said, “happily – except she was often jealous even of certain of his men friends”.

Wheeler was found not guilty of attempted murder and shooting with intent to cause grievous bodily harm. She served a six-month prison sentence at Holloway Gaol for unlawful and malicious wounding. On 2 February 1955, she was released from jail and was photographed by the press strolling with Lord Vivian. According to English socialite Nicky Haslam, Wheeler and Lord Vivian got back together after she was released from prison, and "they lived together happily ever after".

Peerage of the United Kingdom
Preceded by George Vivian	Baron Vivian; 1940–1991	Succeeded by Nicholas Vivian
