= Diana Miller, 9th Baroness Fauconberg =

British aristocrat (1920–2013)

Diana Mary Miller, 11th Countess of Mértola, 15th Baroness Conyers, 9th Baroness Fauconberg (5 July 1920 – 2 March 2013) was the eldest daughter of Sackville Pelham, 5th Earl of Yarborough.

On the death of her father in 1948, she inherited the Portuguese countship of Mértola, while she and her sister, Lady Wendy Lycett became co-heirs to the baronies of Fauconberg and Conyers, which went into abeyance. The death of her sister in 2012 terminated the abeyance in favour of the Countess, who succeeded in the baronies at that point. Since her own death in 2013, the titles are in abeyance once more.

On 15 November 1952, Lady Diana married Robert Miller (d. 1990, in an automobile accident in Harare) and they had two daughters - co-heiresses to the baronies:

- Marcia Anne - adopted name: Anthea Theresa Lycett (born 21 June 1954)
- Beatrix Diana (born 23 August 1955).

When pregnant with Marcia, Lady Diana put her baby for adoption (when separated from her husband, Robert Miller, whom she reconciled to later), which was agreed and accepted by Moira Lycett and her husband Michael, who changed her name to Anthea. In August 1958 Moira and Anthea were flying to London in a Central African Airways' Vickers Viscount aircraft, which crashed near Benghazi. Moira was killed and Anthea injured. Lady Diana's family sought to reclaim the child to the exclusion of the adopted father, Michael Lycett, who refused. He subsequently remarried to the child's aunt, Lady Wendy. Beatrix Miller, Lady Diana's youngest daughter, married in 1991 Simon Armstrong, son of C. W. Armstrong, and they have two sons.

== See also ==
- Burke's Peerage
- Who's Who 2009

Peerage of England
Preceded by Sackville Pelham	Baroness Conyers; Baroness Fauconberg; 2012 – 2013	Vacant Abeyant
Portuguese nobility
Preceded by Sackville Pelham	Count of Mértola; 1948 – 2013	Succeeded by Anthea Lycett
