= Charles Anderson-Pelham, 3rd Earl of Yarborough =

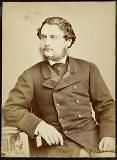
The 3rd Earl of Yarborough.

Charles Anderson-Pelham, 3rd Earl of Yarborough (14 January 1835 – 6 February 1875), known as Lord Worsley from 1846 to 1852, was a British peer.

Yarborough was the son of Charles Anderson-Pelham, 2nd Earl of Yarborough, and his wife Maria Adelaide (née Maude). He was elected to the House of Commons for Great Grimsby in 1857, a seat he held until 1862, when he succeeded his father in the earldom.

Lord Yarborough married Lady Victoria Alexandrina, daughter of William Hare, 2nd Earl of Listowel, in 1858. He died in February 1875, aged only 40, and was succeeded in his titles by his fifteen-year-old son Charles. Lady Yarborough later married John Maunsell Richardson. Their southern English estate was The Cedars in Sunninghill in Berkshire.

Coat of arms of Charles Anderson-Pelham, 3rd Earl of Yarborough
Coronet A coronet of an Earl Crest 1st, a peacock in pride, argent (Pelham); 2nd, a water-spaniel dog, or (Anderson). Escutcheon Quarterly; 1st and 4th grand quarters, quarterly, 1st and 4th azure, three pelicans argent, vulning themselves; 2nd and 3rd gules, two pieces of belts, with buckles erect in pale, the buckles upwards argent (Pelham); 2nd and 3rd grand quarters argent, a chevron between three crosses-flory sable (Anderson). Supporters Dexter: a bay-horse, regardant, charged on the body with three antique buckles, in bend sinister or; sinister, a water-spaniel dog, regardant, or, charged on the body with three crosses-flory in bend sable. Motto Vincit amor patriae;

== Notes ==
Parliament of the United Kingdom
Preceded by The Earl Annesley	Member of Parliament for Great Grimsby; 1857–1862	Succeeded by John Chapman
Peerage of the United Kingdom
Preceded by Charles Anderson Worsley Anderson-Pelham	Earl of Yarborough; 1862–1875	Succeeded by Charles Alfred Worsley Pelham
