= John Pelham, 7th Earl of Yarborough =

John Edward Pelham, 7th Earl of Yarborough (2 June 1920 – 21 March 1991) was a British peer, a member of the House of Lords from 1966 until his death. Before that he was known by the courtesy title of Lord Worsley.

== Early life ==
The son of Marcus Herbert Pelham, 6th Earl of Yarborough and his wife Pamela Douglas-Pennant, he was educated at Eton College and Trinity College, Cambridge, in 1940 graduating BA.

Commissioned into the Grenadier Guards, he fought in the Second World War and rose to the rank of Major by the time he resigned his commission in 1952.

== Career ==
At the general election of 1955, as Lord Worsley, Yarborough stood unsuccessfully for election to the House of Commons as the Conservative candidate at Great Grimsby.

An active member of the British Legion, he was President of its Midland Area, 1959–1960, then of its East Midland Area, 1960–1962, and also a member of the Legion's National Executive Council.

Yarborough was High Sheriff of Lincolnshire in 1964 and was Vice-Lord-Lieutenant of the county between 1964 and 1991.

On 2 December 1966, he succeeded his father as Earl of Yarborough, Baron Yarborough, and Baron Worsley, taking his seat in the House of Lords.

He was President of the Royal Forestry Society from 1987 to 1989.

== Marriage and children ==
On 12 December 1957, Yarborough married Mrs Ann Duffin, previously Florence Ann Petronel Upton, a daughter of John Herbert Upton of Ingmire Hall, Yorkshire, and his wife Petronel Fursdon, and they had four children:

- Lady Sophia Pelham (born 1958)
- Lady Arabella Pelham (born 1960)
- Lady Vanessa Petronel Pelham (born 1961)
- Charles John Pelham (born 1963), who succeeded as Earl of Yarborough

== Notes ==
Peerage of the United Kingdom
Preceded by Marcus Herbert Pelham	Earl of Yarborough; 1966–1991	Succeeded by Charles John Pelham
