= Battle of Elands River (1901) =

Battle of the Second Boer War

- Part of Second Boer War
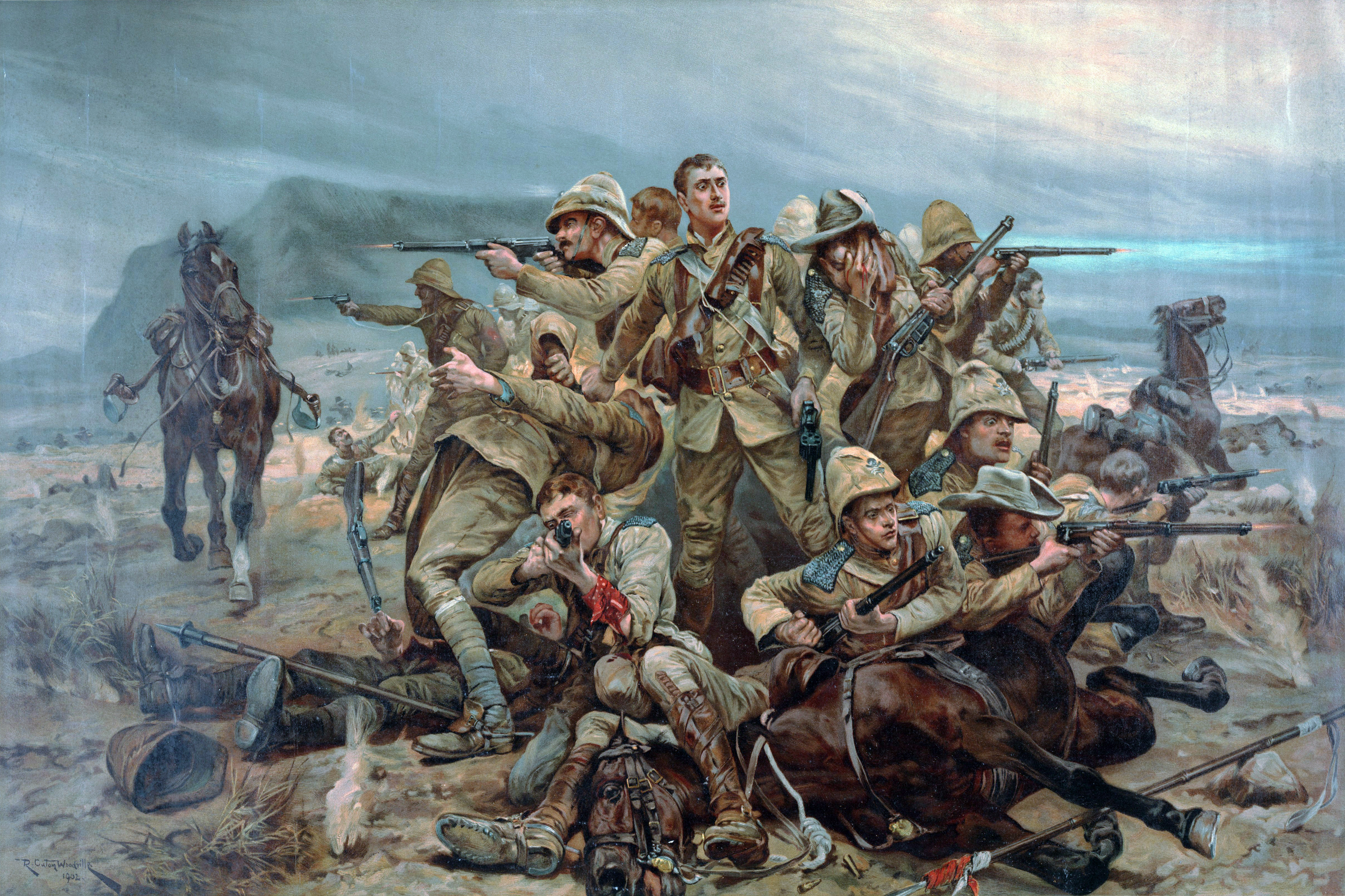
- 17th Lancers in action at Modderfontein, after a painting by Richard Caton Woodville Jr.
Date	17 September 1901
Location	Modderfontein farm, near Tarkastad, South Africa 31°51′3″S 26°10′4″E
Result	Boer victory

Belligerents
(United Kingdom) 17th Lancers, Royal Garrison Artillery	South African Republic

Commanders and leaders
(United Kingdom) Victor Sandeman (WIA)	Jan Smuts

Strength
130	250

Casualties and losses
29 killed, 41 wounded, 60 captured	1 killed, 6 wounded

The Battle of Elands River took place near the Elands River Poort mountain pass on 17 September 1901 during the Second Boer War. During the battle a Boer raiding force under Jan Smuts destroyed a British cavalry squadron led by Captain Sandeman, a cousin of Winston Churchill, on the Modderfontein farm. This battle is therefore also known as the Battle of Modderfontein.

== Background ==
Jan Smuts

After a year of guerrilla war, the Boer leaders decided to send significant raiding forces into the Cape Colony and Natal. About 1000 Boers in six commandos already operated in the Cape Colony. The Boer leaders hoped to cause an uprising in that Dutch-majority territory or at least to widen the theater of war beyond the Boer republics of Orange Free State and South African Republic. Smuts led a commando south into the Cape Colony, while Louis Botha attempted to cross into Natal.

Earlier Boer raids into the Cape Colony proved unsuccessful. All had been eventually hounded out by British mounted columns and had suffered painful losses. Smuts believed he could do better.

== The raid ==
During the trek south to the Orange River, Smuts' commando lost 36 men. He finally crossed into the eastern Cape at Kiba Drift on 3 September. Major General Fitzroy Hart's British force had been guarding the ford, but General Herbert Kitchener mistakenly sent them away on another mission. The Basotho attacked the Boers on 4 September near Wittenberg Mission, killing three and wounding seven with spears and ancient guns before being driven off with serious losses. On 7 September, Smuts went on a scout near Moordenaarspoort (Murderer's Gorge), near Bethulie, when they were ambushed. All three of his companions were shot by the British and Smuts barely escaped.

The cold spring rains tormented both men and horses as British pursuing columns under the overall command of Major General Sir John French closed in on Smuts' raiders. On 13 September, the Boers were cornered atop the Stormberg Mountains (31°17′52.64″S 26°15′17.31″E) and escaped only when a friendly guide in the form of Hans Kleynhans appeared and led them down a precipitous route to safety. The night of 15 September nearly finished the raiders as freezing rain killed over 60 ponies and fourteen men went missing. In front of the Boers, every mountain pass was reportedly held by the British.

== Battle ==
On 17 September, as Smuts' commando threaded through a gorge that opened out into the Elands River valley, a 17-year-old farmer named Jan Coetzer informed them that a British force held the pass at Elands River Poort in the next valley. Smuts commented, "If we don't get those horses and a supply of ammunition, we're done for". The British were C Squadron of the 17th Lancers. The Boers took advantage of a mist to encircle the British camp. When Smuts' vanguard ran head on into a Lancer patrol, the British hesitated to fire because many of the Boers wore captured British uniforms. The Boers immediately opened fire and attacked in front while Smuts led the remainder of his force to attack the British camp from the rear. The British party suffered further casualties at a closed gate that slowed them down. All six British officers were hit and four were killed, only Captain Sandeman, the commander, and Lieutenant Lord George Vivian surviving. The 17th Lancers lost 29 killed and 41 wounded before surrendering. Boer losses were only one killed and six wounded.

In his book Commando, Deneys Reitz, one of the Boers, explained that the victory reversed the fortunes of Smuts' Commando: "We all had fresh horses, fresh rifles, clothing, saddlery, boots and more ammunition than we could carry away, as well as supplies for every man". Reitz also recounts his encounter with Lord Vivian, who pointed out his bivouac tent and told him it would be worth his while to take a look at it. Soon, Reitz, who had been wearing a grain-bag and using an old Mauser rifle with only two rounds of ammunition left, was dressed in a cavalry tunic and riding breeches and armed with a Lee-Metford sporting rifle. Reitz reports that he met Vivian in London in 1935, on excellent terms. (Thomas Pakenham reports a more elaborate story. In this touching account, Vivian overcame Reitz's reluctance to take the spoils of victory, and presented Reitz's original rifle to him in London in 1943. As Vivian died in 1940 this is impossible.

The Boers destroyed a field gun that they captured, while two Maxim guns were dumped in a dam after they proved to be too much trouble.

== Aftermath ==
Smuts and some 250 men of his commando were able to operate for many months in the Cape Colony, but could not win the war. By this time, the Dutch in the Cape Colony were mostly convinced that the Boer republics were losing the war. Though the commando received generous help from Dutch civilians, and indeed commandeered their requirements from people of every background, the British refrained from burning Dutch farms in the Cape Colony as a matter of policy.

While Boers captured in the republics were well-treated as prisoners of war, Boer fighters native to the Cape Colony and captured there were sometimes treated as rebellious subjects and executed by the British. During the campaign, Smuts' commando, replaced worn out clothes with pieces of British khaki uniforms, and Lord Kitchener gave orders that all Boer fighters taken in British uniform were to be executed. Several members of the commando were shot on this basis, (Note: "Neither then, nor for weeks later, did we know that the death penalty attached to the wearing of khaki, and although after a while rumours reached us through the country people that our men were being executed, these stories left us doubting and perplexed. We could not believe that the English were resorting to the shooting of prisoners, and it was only after many had been executed that we learned of Kitchener's proclamation ordering the death of all Boers caught in khaki. As far as I know no steps were ever taken by the military to acquaint us with its contents".) others for being treasonous subjects of the Cape Colony. When the remaining members found out about this order, they dressed themselves in civilian clothes as soon as they could. (Note: "From what I could make out, the executions had been kept quiet, but now, for some reason or other, perhaps the killing of Captain Watson, the military authorities were giving them publicity. ... so I lost no time in changing the [British officer's] tunic I wore for a coat which I borrowed from our host, who also supplied such of my companions as were in khaki with whatever he had in the way of civilian dress".)
