= Brocklesby Hall =

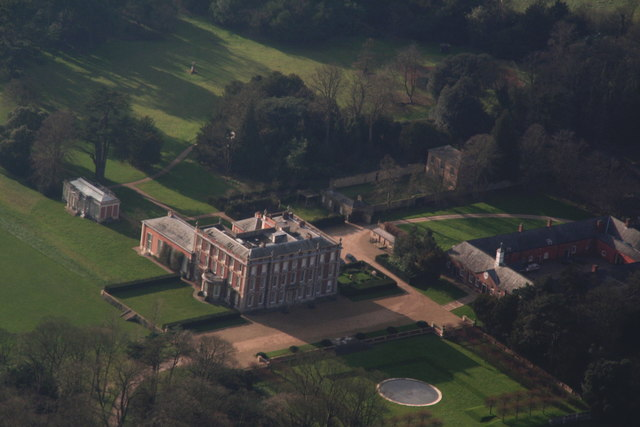
- The hall from the air

- Location within Lincolnshire
- Interactive map of Brocklesby Hall
- 53°35′11″N 0°17′00″W
- Type: Country house
- Location: Brocklesby, Lincolnshire

History
- Built for: Earl of Yarborough

Site notes
- Current use: Private estate
- Website: Brocklesby Estate

Listed Building – Grade I
- Official name: Brocklesby Hall
- Designated: 25 October 1951
- Reference no.: 1359800

Listed Building – Grade I
- Official name: Holgate Monument
- Designated: 1 November 1966
- Reference no.: 1063417

Listed Building – Grade I
- Official name: Hunt kennels and house
- Designated: 1 November 1966
- Reference no.: 1166049

Listed Building – Grade I
- Official name: The Hermitage
- Designated: 24 January 1985
- Reference no.: 1063418

Listed Building – Grade I
- Official name: Mausoleum, wall and screen
- Designated: 25 October 1951
- Reference no.: 1063361

National Register of Historic Parks and Gardens
- Official name: Brocklesby Park
- Designated: 24 June 1985
- Reference no.: 1000971

Brocklesby Hall is a country house near to the village of Brocklesby in the West Lindsey district of Lincolnshire, England. The house is a Grade I listed building and the surrounding park is listed, also at Grade I, on the Register of Historic Parks and Gardens of Special Historic Interest in England.

== History ==
The 27,000 acre (113 square kilometre) Brocklesby Park estate has been in the possession of the Pelham family since the 16th century. A cadet branch of the Sussex Pelhams, Charles Pelham (c. 1679 – 1763) inherited the Brocklesby Estate from his father, and further land from his uncle. Between 1708 and 1730, he extensively remodelled an earlier house on the site. His great-nephew, Charles Anderson-Pelham (1749 – 1823), one of the richest commoners in England, was elevated to the peerage as first Baron Yarborough. His heir, also Charles (1781 – 1846), was created Earl of Yarborough in 1837. The father engaged Charles Heathcote Tatham to make extensions to the house, and Jeffry Wyatville drew up plans for a grandiose expansion. (Note: Jeffry Wyatville envisaged the construction of a huge Neoclassical palace on a three-court plan. He donated his plans and perspectives to the Royal Academy in 1824, where they remain.) These were not carried forward but James Wyatt did undertake some work on the estate, including the kennels and the mausoleum to Sophia Aufrere, Charles' wife, who died in 1786. Charles Anderson-Pelham also employed Capability Brown to remodel the grounds, and Brown's work included the Newsham Bridge, to the north of the estate.

In 1898, following a disastrous fire at the house, Reginald Blomfield undertook a major reconstruction, but most of his external work was removed in a drastic remodelling and reduction of the house by Claude Phillimore in 1957-1958. The hall remains the private home of the Earls of Yarborough and is not open to the public.

== Architecture and description ==
Nicholas Antram, in his Lincolnshire volume of the Pevsner Buildings of England series, revised and reissued in 2002, notes that the architectural history of the hall is complex. The combined efforts of Charles Tatham, Jeffry Wyatville and James Wyatt are hard to disentangle. William Burn also made contributions in the later 19th century, but much was destroyed, externally and internally, in the fire of 1898. Sir Reginald Blomfield undertook a "meticulous" reconstruction, but most of this work was later removed by Claude Phillimore. The present house is a large rectangular block in red brick, with a nine bay, three-storey façade. This is a remodelling of the west wing of the original house. A one-storey wing, a picture gallery designed by Tatham, remains to the side. Phillimore created a new entrance in the angle of the main block and this gallery. Antram considers it, "the least successful part of [his] work" at Brocklesby.

The stable block has a turret clock by John Harrison, an early example of a wooden clock dating from c.1722.

=== Historic listing designations ===
Brocklesby Hall is a Grade I listed building. Its park is listed, also at Grade I, on the Register of Historic Parks and Gardens of Special Historic Interest in England. The estate contains a large number of listed structures, over 30 in total, including seven at the highest Grade I listing. Those buildings listed at Grades I or at II* are listed below.

Name	Location	Photograph	Date	Notes	Grade
Brocklesby Hall	Brocklesby		18th - 20th centuries	For the Earl of Yarborough	I
Holgate Monument	South-east of the house		1785	By James Wyatt for the 1st Baron Yarborough, to commemorate a friend, George Holgate.	I
Hunt kennels and house	South-east of the house		1810	By James Wyatt to house the hounds of the Brocklesby Hunt.	I
Church of All Saints	South-east of the house		14th century	The estate church.	I
Newsham Bridge	North of the house	Park House	1772	By Capability Brown	I
The Hermitage	South of the house		Late 18th century	A garden house constructed of roots.	I
Mausoleum, wall and screen	South of the house		1793	By James Wyatt for Charles Anderson-Pelham in memory of Sophia, his wife. She is commemorated inside with a statue by Joseph Nollekens.	I
Newsham Lodge	North of the house		c.1800	Possibly by Jeffry Wyatville.	II*
Main stable block	North-east of the house		Late 17th/early 18th century	Brick-built courtyard.	II*
Gateway to house	North-east of the house			Elaborate gateway with gatepiers attributed to James Wyatt.	II*
Orangery	North-west of the house		18th century	Attributed to Charles Heathcote Tatham. (Note: The Orangery contains a collection of Classical sculpture, moved from Appuldurcombe House, a property on the Isle of Wight which the Pelhams sold in 1855.)	II*
Conservatory	South-west of the house		1785	Attributed to James Wyatt	II*
Garden Urn	West of the house		Late 18th century	Probably by James Wyatt	II*
Arabella Aufrere Temple	South of the house		1787	Probably by James Wyatt.	II*

== Sources ==
- Pevsner, Nikolaus; Harris, John; Antram, Nicholas (2002). Lincolnshire. The Buildings of England. New Haven, US and London: Yale University Press. ISBN 0-300-09620-8.
