= Baron Fauconberg =

English Peerage

Baron Fauconberg (also Falconberg or Falconbridge) is an hereditary title created twice in the Peerage of England.

First created in 1295 when Sir Walter de Fauconberg, an Anglo-Norman, was summoned to parliament. Between 1463 and 1903 the peerage title fell abeyant until its abeyance was terminated in favour of Marcia Lane-Fox, Baroness Fauconberg and Conyers, who succeeded her father, Sackville Lane-Fox.

After the abeyance of 1463 the right to the barony of Fauconberg which resulted in the termination of 1903 was held jointly with the barony of Conyers; and, since then the two baronies have followed the same line of succession, including further abeyancies between 1948 and 2012 and from 2013.

The Countess of Yarborough predeceased her husband in 1926 when her family titles were inherited by her eldest surviving son, Lord Conyers (later 5th Earl of Yarborough). On his death in 1948 these ancient baronies again fell abeyant, between his two daughters as co-heirs, whilst the earldom was inherited by his brother.

Following the death of the younger of Lord Yarborough's daughters in 2012, the titles were called out of abeyance in favour of his surviving daughter, Lady Diana Miller (later Countess of Mértola), 9th holder of the barony of Fauconberg and 16th of Conyers. Since Diana, Countess of Mértola's death in 2013, both titles have fallen back into abeyance.

A descendant of the 1st Baron Fauconberg (by Writ), Sir Thomas Belasyse, 2nd Baronet, was elevated to the peerage as Baron Fauconberg, of Yarm in the County of York, in 1627; his grandson was advanced as Earl Fauconberg in 1689. For more information on this creation, see Viscount Fauconberg.

== Barons Fauconberg; first creation (1295) ==
- Walter de Fauconberg, 1st Baron Fauconberg (d. 1304)
- Walter de Fauconberg, 2nd Baron Fauconberg (1264–1314)
- John de Fauconberg, 3rd Baron Fauconberg (1290–1349)
- Walter de Fauconberg, 4th Baron Fauconberg (1319–1362)
- Thomas de Fauconberg, 5th Baron Fauconberg (1345–1407)
- Joan de Fauconberg, 6th Baroness Fauconberg (1406–1490) (abeyance terminated 1429 for her husband, William Neville, 1st Earl of Kent, who d. 1463; abeyant on her death)
- Marcia Amelia Mary Pelham, 7th Baroness Fauconberg (1863–1926) (abeyance terminated 1903)
- Sackville George Pelham, 5th Earl of Yarborough, 8th Baron Fauconberg (1888–1948) (abeyant 1948)
- Diana Miller, 11th Countess of Mértola, 9th Baroness Fauconberg (1920–2013) (abeyance terminated 2012 until 2013)

The co-heiresses to the title are the two daughters of Lady Diana Miller, also Baroness Fauconberg and Conyers, Marcia Anne Miller now Anthea, Countess of Mértola (born 1954), and Beatrix Diana Miller now Mrs Armstrong (born 1955), who married in 1991 Simon Armstrong; they have two sons.

== Barons Fauconberg; second creation (1627) ==
- see Viscount Fauconberg (extinct 1815)

== See also ==
- Abeyance
- Baron Belasyse
- Baron Conyers
- Countess of Mértola
- Fauconberg Arms Inn
