= Brocklesby =

Village and civil parish in Lincolnshire, England

Coordinates: 53.585315°N 0.275365°W

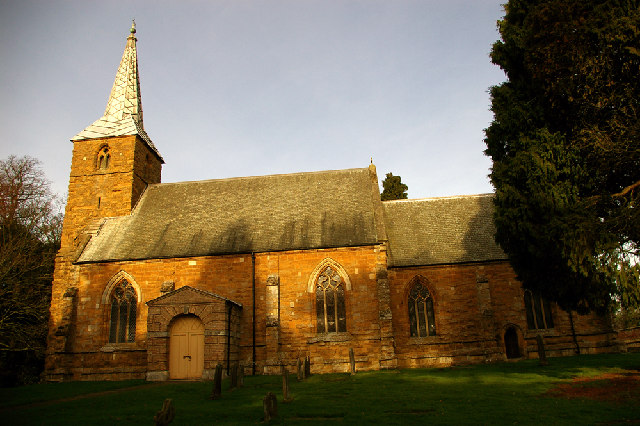
- All Saints' Church, Brocklesby

- Location within Lincolnshire
- OS grid reference: TA143112
  - London: 145 mi (233 km) S
- District: West Lindsey
- Shire county: Lincolnshire
- Region: East Midlands
- Country: England
- Sovereign state: United Kingdom
- Post town: Grimsby
- Postcode district: DN41
- Police: Lincolnshire
- Fire: Lincolnshire
- Ambulance: East Midlands
- UK Parliament: Gainsborough

Brocklesby is a village and civil parish in the West Lindsey district of Lincolnshire, England. It is situated 1 mile (1.6 km) south of Habrough, 4 miles (6.4 km) south-west of Immingham, it is located close to the border of both North Lincolnshire and North East Lincolnshire and is near Humberside International Airport. Its location makes it the most northerly village within the East Midlands region.

According to the 2001 Census, Brocklesby had a population of 124. At the 2011 census, the population was listed in the civil parish of Keelby.

The parish includes the settlement of Limber Parva (or Little Limber), which lies 1.5 miles (2.4 km) to the south-west, and is the site of a deserted medieval village, defined by earthworks and crop marks of crofts, hollow ways and rectilinear enclosures.

Newsham Abbey was located to the north of the village in the hamlet of Newsham, now part of the Brocklesby civil parish.

Brocklesby had a railway station until the 1990s, and it was closed. The station building and platforms are now a private residence, with the main railway lines still passing through it. The nearest railway station in current use is at Habrough.

== Brocklesby Hall ==
The Grade I listed Brocklesby Hall ( 53°35'11.44"N 0°17'0.09"W ) is a large country house standing in the 27,000 acre (113 square kilometre) Brocklesby Park Estate. It probably dates from the 16th century, but was altered before 1708 and remodelled circa 1730. It was severely fire damaged in 1898, restored by the architect Sir Reginald Blomfield, and then reduced in size in the 20th century by the architect Claud Phillimore. It is built of brick in 3 storeys to a U-shaped floor plan with a 9-bay frontage. The 1898 fire and Phillimore's renovations destroyed most of the original interior features.

The Pelham family originally moved to Lincolnshire in 1565, and the property has descended in the family to Charles Pelham, the 8th and current Earl of Yarborough.

The estate is primarily agricultural with a substantial acreage of woodland. The 1000-acre Park and woodlands were laid out in the 1770s by Capability Brown for Charles Anderson-Pelham, 1st Baron Yarborough and contain a significant number of (43) listed architectural features.

The Grade I listed Anglican parish church, dedicated to All Saints, stands in the park. The church holds memorials to the Pelham family, particularly Charles Pelham, Lord Worsley, who was killed during the First World War.

Also in Brocklesby Park is the Pelham Mausoleum, built in 1787 by James Wyatt for Charles Anderson-Pelham, 1st Baron Yarborough.

The Holgate Monument, created in 1785 by James Wyatt, is a Grade I listed memorial to Charles Anderson-Pelham, 1st Baron Yarborough's friend George Holgate, in the form of a triangular pedestal supported on three tortoises and topped by an urn.

The Hunt kennels and house are Grade I listed, as is the Newsham Bridge and the Hermitage.

== Community ==
The ecclesiastical parish is part of the Brocklesby Park group of parishes in the Deanery of Yarborough.

Local democracy is run as a Parish meeting.
