= George Vivian, 4th Baron Vivian =

British soldier

George Vivian

Member of the House of Lords
- In office February 1900

Personal details
- Born: 21 January 1878 Connaught Place, London, England
- Died: 28 December 1940 (aged 62)
- Spouse(s): Barbara Fanning (m. 1903–1907) Nancy Green (m. 1911)
- Children: 4, including Daphne and Anthony
- Parent: Hussey Vivian (father)
- Relatives: Vivian family
- Military career
- Allegiance: Great Britain
- Branch: Army
- Unit: 17th Lancers
- Conflicts: Second Anglo-Boer War; World War I
- Awards: Distinguished Service Order; Legion of Honour; Croix de Guerre

George Crespigny Brabazon Vivian, 4th Baron Vivian DSO TD DL (21 January 1878 – 28 December 1940) was a British soldier from the Vivian family who served with distinction in both the Second Anglo-Boer War and World War I.

== Early life ==
He was born at Connaught Place, London, on 21 January 1878 to Hussey Vivian, 3rd Baron Vivian and Louisa Duff.

He was educated at Eton College where he rowed in the VIII and was elected into Pop. Succeeding to the title in October 1893, at the age of 15, he took his seat in the House of Lords in February 1900. He subsequently joined the British Army and was commissioned a cavalry officer as second lieutenant in the 17th Lancers on 14 March 1900.

== Military career ==
Lord Vivian served with considerable distinction in the Second Anglo-Boer War.

=== Battle of Elands River ===
On 17 September 1901, Smuts' commando encountered the 17th Lancers in the vicinity of Tarkastad. Smuts realised that the Lancers' camp was their one opportunity to re-equip themselves with horses, food and clothing. A fierce fight, subsequently to be known as the Battle of Elands River, took place with the Lancers being caught in a cross-fire and suffering heavy casualties. Stunned by the onslaught, the remaining Lancers put up a white flag. Deneys Reitz, a younger commando member, encountered Captain Victor Sandeman, the Lancers' commander, and Vivian, who was his lieutenant, among the wounded.

In his book Commando, Deneys Reitz, one of the Boers, recounts how Vivian pointed out his bivouac tent and told him it would be worth his while to take a look at it. Soon, Reitz, who had been wearing a grain-bag and using an old Mauser rifle with only two rounds of ammunition left, was dressed in a cavalry tunic and riding breeches and armed with a Lee-Metford sporting rifle. Reitz reports that he met Lord Vivian again in London in 1935, on excellent terms, and again in 1939 whilst in Britain on an official trip as Deputy Prime Minister of South Africa.

Thomas Pakenham, in his introduction to the 1983 Jonathan Ball edition of Commando, reports a more elaborate story. In this touching account, Vivian overcomes Reitz's reluctance to take Vivian's possessions, and presents Reitz's original rifle to him in London in 1943. As Vivian died in 1940 this is impossible, although Pakenham may have simply got the year wrong, as Reitz did meet Lord Vivian again during his 1939 trip.

=== Later military service ===
Recovering from wounds received in the battle, Vivian returned to the United Kingdom in December 1901.

He later served in the First World War, being appointed to the Distinguished Service Order in 1918.

Among his medals were the Distinguished Service Order, the Legion of Honour, and the Croix de Guerre. He was appointed aide-de-camp to King Albert I of Belgium. He was also awarded the Ordre de Leopold with Palm, Officer.

== Marriages and children ==
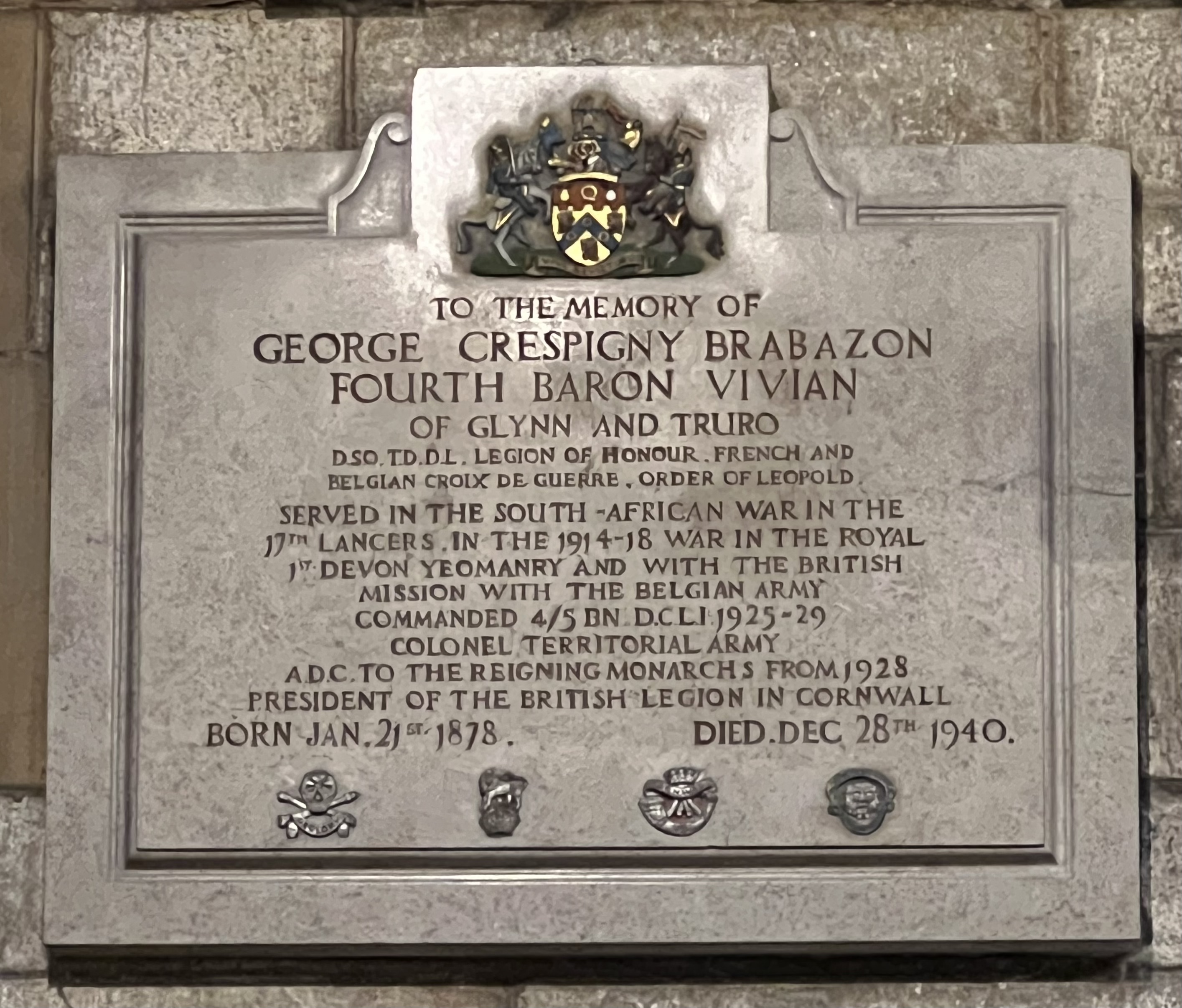
Memorial in Truro Cathedral

On 1 August 1903 Vivian married former Gaiety Girl Barbara Cicely Fanning (who was to marry three further times). They had two children:

- Hon Daphne Winifred Louise Vivian (11 July 1904 - 5 December 1997)
- Anthony Crespigny Claude Vivian, 5th Baron Vivian (4 March 1906 - 24 June 1991)

They divorced in 1907. The co-respondent was Alfred Curphey.

Lord Vivian was married secondly on 5 January 1911 to Nancy Lycett Green (died 6 May 1970), daughter of Sir Edward Lycett Green, 2nd Baronet. They also had two children:

- Hon Ursula Vanda Maud Vivian (16 June 1912 - 11 November 1984)
- Hon Douglas David Edward Vivian (16 January 1915 - 27 July 1973)

He died on 28 December 1940, aged 62.

Peerage of the United Kingdom
Preceded by Hussey Vivian	Baron Vivian; 1893–1940	Succeeded by Anthony Vivian
