= Charles Pelham, Lord Worsley =

British Army officer

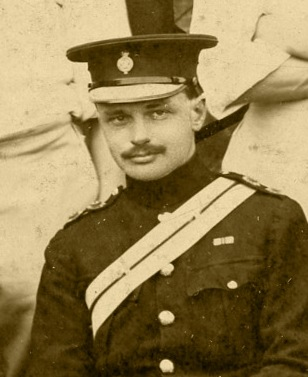
- Lord Worsley in 1913
- Born: 14 August 1887
- Died: 30 October 1914 (aged 27); Zandvoorde, Belgium
- Spouse: Alexandra Vivian (m. 1911)
- Parent(s): Charles and Marcia Pelham
- Relatives: Sackville Pelham (brother)
- Military career
- Rank: Lieutenant
- Unit: Royal Horse Guards
- Conflicts: World War I

Charles Sackville Pelham, Lord Worsley (14 August 1887 – 30 October 1914) was a British soldier. He was the son of Charles Pelham, 4th Earl of Yarborough and Marcia Pelham, Countess of Yarborough. On 31 January 1911, Lord Worsley married Alexandra Mary Freesia Vivian, daughter of Hussey Vivian, 3rd Baron Vivian and the former Louisa Alice Duff, and sister-in-law of General Haig. Worsley was killed in action during the First World War, aged 27.

Due to Charles Worsley's death at a relatively young age, the title of Earl of Yarborough later passed directly from his father to his younger brother, Sackville George Pelham, who also assumed Charles's courtesy title of Lord Worsley.

== Death in Flanders ==
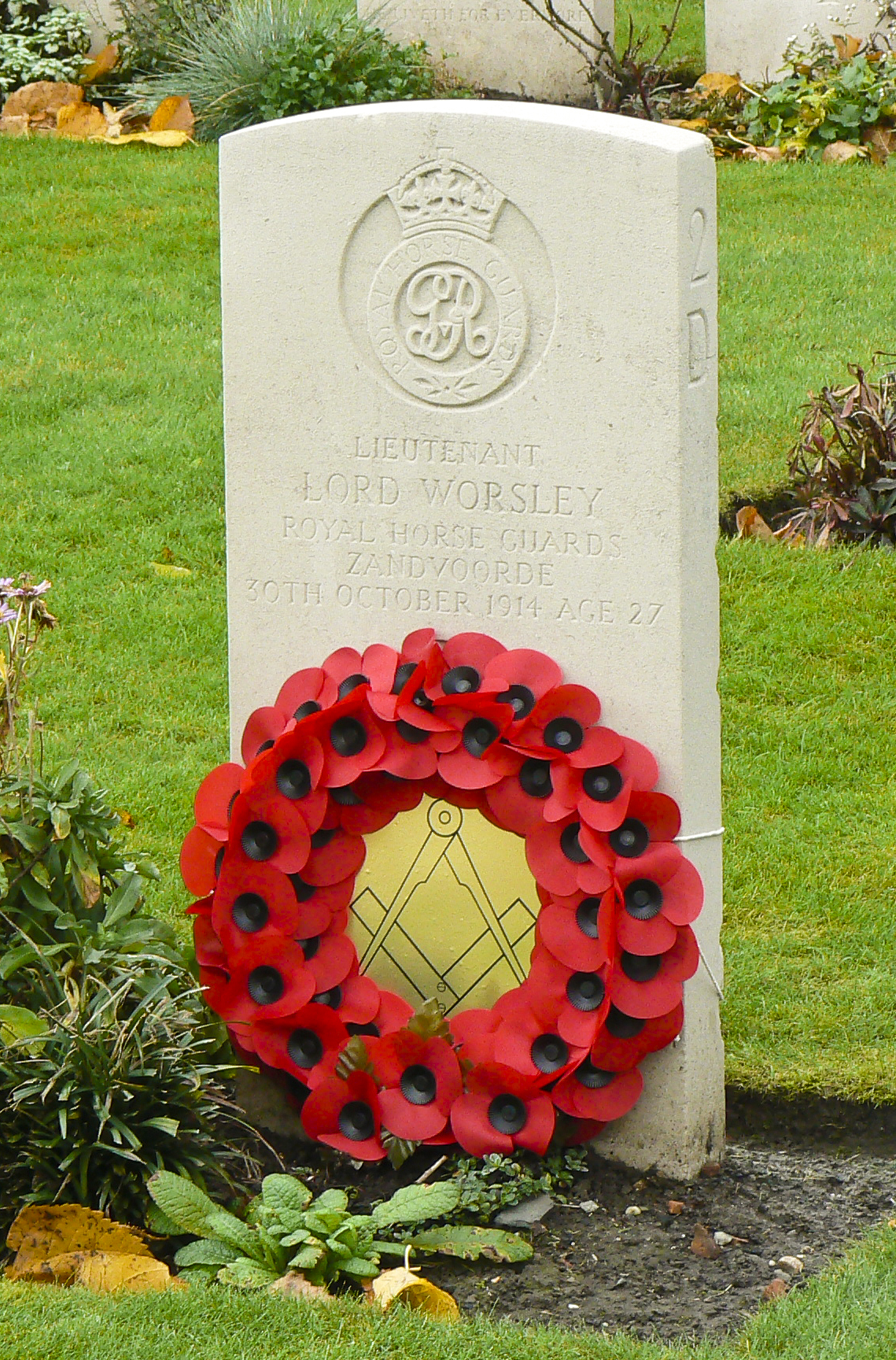
Lord Worsley's CWGC gravestone

In World War I, Charles Worsley served as a lieutenant in C Squadron of the Royal Horse Guards during hostilities in Flanders, commanding a machine gun section. On 30 October 1914, Worsley's section was cut off at Zandvoorde, Belgium, by a German attack and he was killed at the age of 27. Lord Worsley was first listed as "missing in action", but was officially recorded as dead early in 1915.

Worsley's body was buried by German soldiers, and a map of his burial location was later passed on via diplomatic channels to the British, which enabled them to relocate his grave in December 1918. It was marked with an upright wooden cross which had been placed there by the Germans. In January 1919 a replacement wooden cross was erected, and Lord Worsley's widow subsequently purchased the plot of land.

== Memorials ==
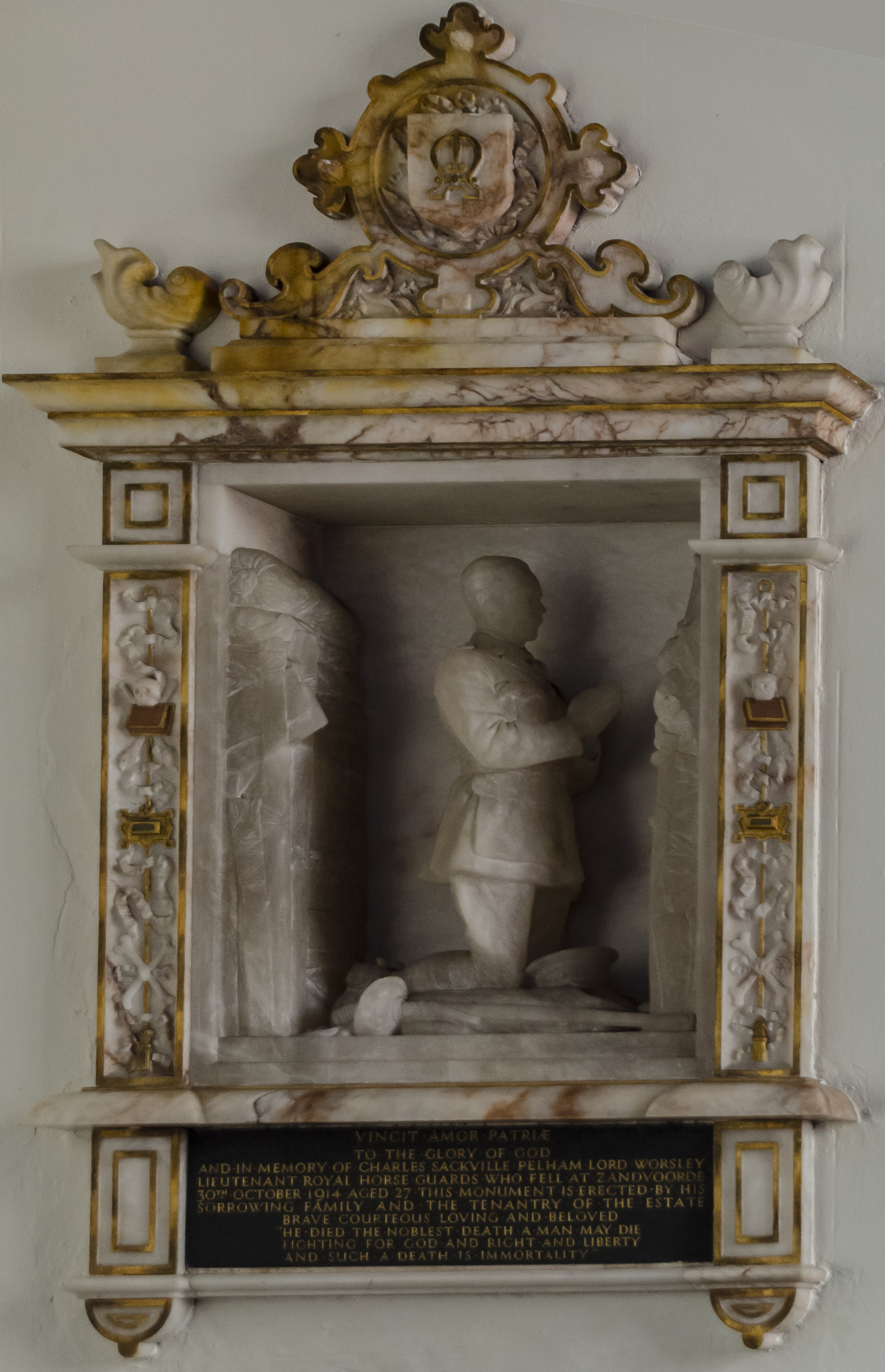
Memorial in All Saints church, Brocklesby

Lord Worsley's body was exhumed in 1921 and reburied in Ypres at the Town Cemetery Military Extension. The inscription on his gravestone reads: HE DIED FIGHTING FOR GOD AND RIGHT AND LIBERTY AND SUCH A DEATH IS IMMORTALITY. On the spot where Lord Worsley's body was originally buried by the Germans now stands the Household Cavalry Memorial in the centre of Zandvoorde. Lord Worsley's name can be seen on the memorial very near the bottom.

A memorial to Lord Worsley was erected in Britain, in All Saints Church, Brocklesby, Lincolnshire; it is a marble relief in a 17th-century style (to complement the adjacent Pelham family tomb of 1629), depicting Worsley dressed in military uniform, kneeling at prayer, and was carved by the sculptor Charles Sargeant Jagger. The memorial is inscribed with the legend:

VINCIT AMOR PATRAE

TO THE GLORY OF GOD
AND IN MEMORY OF CHARLES SACKVILLE PELHAM LORD WORSLEY
LIEUTENANT ROYAL HORSE GUARDS WHO FELL AT ZANDVOORDE
30TH OCTOBER 1914 AGED 27. THIS MONUMENT ERECTED BY HIS
SORROWING FAMILY AND THE TENANTRY OF THE ESTATE.

HE DIED AS FEW MEN GET THE CHANCE TO DIE
FIGHTING TO SAVE A WORLD'S MORALITY
HE DIED THE NOBLEST DEATH A MAN MAY DIE
FIGHTING FOR GOD AND RIGHT AND LIBERTY
AND SUCH A DEATH IS IMMORTALITY.

— Inscription on Lord Worsley's memorial, All Saints, Brocklesby
