= Charles Pelham, 8th Earl of Yarborough =

British peer and landowner (born 1963)

Charles John Pelham, 8th Earl of Yarborough (born 5 November 1963), styled Lord Worsley between 1966 and 1991, is a British peer and landowner. He was a member of the House of Lords from 1991 to 1999.

== Background and career ==
Yarborough is the son of John Pelham, 7th Earl of Yarborough and Florence Anne Petronel Upton. He was educated at Eton College and the University of Bristol.

In 1991 he succeeded his father as Earl of Yarborough (1837), Baron Worsley, of Appuldurcombe (1837) and Baron Yarborough (1794), becoming a member of the House of Lords.

He was appointed High Sheriff of Lincolnshire for 2014–15, when it was reported that he had converted to Islam and was also known by the name Abdul Mateen.

== Marriage and family ==
Yarborough married Anna-Karin Zecevic, daughter of George Zecevic, on 26 January 1990. They have five children:

- George John Sackville Pelham, Lord Worsley (born 9 August 1990)
- William Charles John Walter Pelham (born 28 December 1991)
- James Marcus Pelham (born 8 March 1994)
- Lady Margaret Ann Emily Pelham (born 30 January 1997)
- Edward John Herbert Pelham (born 6 March 2002)

== Coat of arms ==
Coat of arms of Charles Pelham, 8th Earl of Yarborough
Coronet A coronet of an Earl Crest A peacock in pride argent. Escutcheon Quarterly: 1st and 4th azure, three pelicans vulning themselves argent; 2nd and 3rd gules, two pieces of belts with buckles, erect in pale, the buckles upwards argent. Supporters Dexter: a bay-horse, regardant, charged on the body with three antique buckles, in bend sinister or; sinister, a water-spaniel dog, regardant, or, charged on the body with three crosses-flory in bend sable. Motto Vincit amor patriae (The love of my country will prevail).

== See also ==
- Duke of Leeds (created 1694, extinct 1964)
  - The Immortal Seven
  - The Glorious Revolution

Peerage of the United Kingdom
Preceded by John Edward Pelham	Earl of Yarborough; 1991–present	Incumbent
