= Hussey Vivian, 3rd Baron Vivian =

British diplomat

The Right Honourable Hussey Vivian, 3rd Baron Vivian
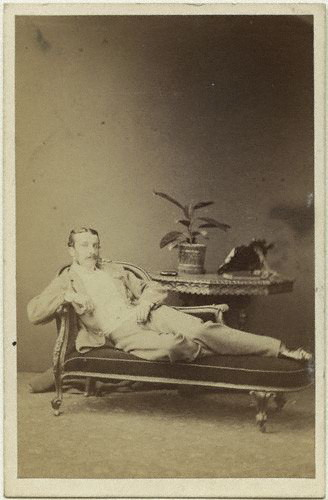
- Hussey Crespigny Vivian, 3rd Baron Vivian

Ambassador to Italy
- In office 1892–1893

Minister to Belgium
- In office 1884–1892

Ambassador to Denmark
- In office 1881–1884

Envoy Extraordinary and Minister Plenipotentiary to the Swiss Confederation
- In office March–July 1881

Resident Minister to the Swiss Confederation
- In office 1879–1881

Consul-General to Egypt
- In office 1873-1874; 1876–1879

Consul-General to Wallachia and Moldavia
- In office 1874–1876

Personal details
- Born: 19 June 1834 Connaught Place, London, England
- Died: 21 October 1893 (aged 59) Rome, Italy
- Spouse: Louisa Duff (m. 1876)
- Children: 5, including George and Alexandra
- Relatives: Vivian family Douglas Haig (son-in-law); Charles Pelham (son-in-law)

Hussey Crespigny Vivian, 3rd Baron Vivian, GCMG, CB, PC, DL, FRGS (19 June 1834 – 21 October 1893) was a British diplomat from the Vivian family.

== Background ==
Born at Connaught Place, London, Vivian was the eldest son of Charles Vivian, 2nd Baron Vivian, and was educated at Eton College.

== Later diplomatic career ==
In 1873, Vivian was sent to Alexandria as Consul-General. In 1878, he was appointed to the Order of the Bath as a Companion (CB). He was sent to Bern as Minister Resident in 1879, and was promoted to Envoy Extraordinary and Minister Plenipotentiary to the Swiss Confederation in 1881. Few months later, he was transferred to Copenhagen, and in 1884 to Brussels, where he was appointed to the Order of St Michael and St George as a Knight Commander (KCMG) in the 1886 Birthday Honours. Having succeeded to his father's title in 1886, he was appointed to be a deputy lieutenant of the County of Cornwall in 1887. In the 1890 Birthday Honours, he was promoted in the Order of St Michael and St George to be a Knight Grand Cross (GCMG). His final and highest position was to Rome in 1892, where he remained until he died from pneumonia in 1893. He was sworn of the Privy Council on the year of his death. The Prince of Naples was present at his funeral.

== Marriage and children ==
On 8 June 1876, Vivian married Louisa Duff and they had five children, including:

- George Crespigny Brabazon Vivian, 4th Baron Vivian (1878–1940)
- Hon Dorothy Maud Vivian (1879–1939), married Field Marshal Douglas Haig, 1st Earl Haig.
- Hon Alexandra Mary Freesia Vivian (1890–1963), married Charles Pelham, Lord Worsley.

Diplomatic posts
Preceded by ?	Consul-General to Egypt; 1873–1874	Succeeded by ?
Preceded by John Green	Consul-General to Wallachia and Moldavia; 1874–1876	Succeeded by Charles Mansfield
Preceded by Edward Stanton	Consul-General to Egypt; 1876–1879	Succeeded by Edward Malet
Preceded by Sir Horace Rumbold, 8th Bt	Resident Minister to the Swiss Confederation; 1879–1881	Succeeded by Himself
Preceded by Himself	Envoy Extraordinary and Minister Plenipotentiary to the Swiss Confederation; March–July 1881	Succeeded by Francis Ottiwell Adams
Preceded by Hugh MacDonell	Ambassador to Denmark; 1881–1884	Succeeded by Sir Edmund Monson, 1st Baronet
Preceded by Edward Malet	Minister to Belgium; 1884–1892	Succeeded by Sir Edmund Monson, 1st Baronet
Preceded by The Marquess of Dufferin and Ava	Ambassador to Italy; 1892–1893	Succeeded by Sir Clare Ford
Peerage of the United Kingdom
Preceded by Charles Vivian	Baron Vivian; 1886–1893	Succeeded by George Vivian
