= Baron Conyers =

English peerage created 1509, abeyant since 2013

Barony of Conyers
- Conyers Arms; Azure, a Maunch Or.
- Creation date: 17 October 1509
- Created by: King Henry VIII
- Peerage: Peerage of England
- First holder: William Conyers, 1st Baron Conyers
- Last holder: Diana Miller, 15th Baronet Conyers & 9th Baroness Fauconberg
- Remainder to: Created by writ of summons
- Status: Abeyant
- Extinction date: Abeyant – 2 March 2013

Baron Conyers is a title in the Peerage of England. It was created on 17 October 1509 for William Conyers, the son-in-law of William Neville, 1st Earl of Kent. The abeyance after the death of the 3rd baron was terminated for the 7th Baron Darcy de Knayth; the two baronies were then held together until abeyance of both in 1888. Subsequently the abeyances of the two baronies were separately terminated, that of the Barons Conyers in 1903.

Since 1509, the Barons Conyers had held a part of the "right" to the barony Fauconberg, i.e. the part for which the abeyance was similarly terminated in 1903. From then the two baronies, Conyers and Fauconberg, were held together; from 1948 they were again abeyant, between the two daughters of the 5th Earl of Yarborough. On the death of the younger daughter in 2012 the abeyance terminated automatically in favour of her elder sister, the 15th holder of the title. Since the death of the latter in 2013, the title is abeyant once more.

The baronies Conyers and Darcy de Knayth originated the courtesy title of the eldest son of the Earl of Holderness as Lord Darcy and Conyers.

== Barons Conyers (1509) ==
- William Conyers, 1st Baron Conyers (d. 1524)
- Christopher Conyers, 2nd Baron Conyers (d. 1538)
- John Conyers, 3rd Baron Conyers (d. 1557) (abeyant 1557)
- Conyers Darcy, 7th Baron Darcy de Knayth and 4th Baron Conyers (1570–1654) (abeyance terminated c. 1641/44 in favour of the 3rd Baron's grandson)
- Conyers Darcy, 1st Earl of Holderness, 8th Baron Darcy de Knayth and 5th Baron Conyers (d. 1689)
- Conyers Darcy, 2nd Earl of Holderness, 9th Baron Darcy de Knayth and 6th Baron Conyers (c. 1620–1692)
- Robert Darcy, 3rd Earl of Holderness, 10th Baron Darcy de Knayth and 7th Baron Conyers (1681–1722)
- Robert Darcy, 4th Earl of Holderness, 11th Baron Darcy de Knayth and 8th Baron Conyers (1718–1778)
- Amelia Osborne, 12th Baroness Darcy de Knayth and 9th Baroness Conyers (1754–1784)
- George William Frederick Osborne, 6th Duke of Leeds, 13th Baron Darcy de Knayth and 10th Baron Conyers (1775–1838)
- Francis Godolphin Darcy-Osborne, 7th Duke of Leeds, 14th Baron Darcy de Knayth and 11th Baron Conyers (1798–1859)
- Sackville George Lane-Fox, 15th Baron Darcy de Knayth and 12th Baron Conyers (1827–1888) (abeyant 1888)
- Marcia Amelia Mary Pelham, 7th Baroness Fauconberg and 13th Baroness Conyers (1863–1926) (abeyance terminated 1892)
- Sackville George Pelham, 5th Earl of Yarborough, 8th Baron Fauconberg and 14th Baron Conyers (1888–1948) (abeyant 1948)
- Diana Mary Miller, 11th Countess of Mértola, 9th Baroness Fauconberg, 15th Baroness Conyers (1920–2013) (abeyance terminated 2012; abeyant 2013)

The co-heiresses to the title are the two daughters of the 15th baroness, the Hon Marcia Anne Miller (born 1954) otherwise known as Anthea Theresa Lycett, and the Hon Beatrix Diana Miller (born 1955).
