= Abeyance =

When property, titles, or office are without a claimant or owner

Abeyance (from the Old French abeance meaning "gaping") describes a state of temporary dormancy or suspension. In law, it can refer to a situation where the ownership of property, titles, or office is not currently vested in any specific person, but is awaiting the appearance or determination of the rightful owner. This typically applies to future estates that have not yet vested, and may never vest. For example, an estate is granted to A for life, with the remainder to the heir of B upon A's death. If B is still alive, the remainder is held in abeyance because B can have no legal heir until B's own death.

The term hold in abeyance is used in lawsuits and court cases when a case is temporarily put on hold.

== English peerage law ==
=== History ===
The most common use of the term is in the case of English peerage dignities. Most such peerages pass to heirs-male, but the ancient baronies created by writ, as well as some very old earldoms, pass instead to heirs-general (by cognatic primogeniture). In this system, sons are preferred from eldest to youngest, the heirs of a son over the next son, and any son over daughters, but there is no preference among daughters: they or their heirs inherit equally.

If the daughter is an only child or her sisters are deceased and have no living issue, she (or her heir) is vested with the title; otherwise, since a peerage cannot be shared nor divided, the dignity goes into abeyance between the sisters or their heirs, and is held by no one. If through lack of issue, marriage, or both, eventually only one person represents the claims of all the sisters, they can claim the dignity as a matter of right, and the abeyance is said to be terminated. On the other hand, the number of prospective heirs can grow quite large, since each share potentially can be divided between daughters, where the owner of a share dies without leaving a son.

A co-heir may petition the Crown for a termination of the abeyance. The Crown may choose to grant the petition, but if there is any doubt whatsoever as to the pedigree of the petitioner, the claim is normally referred to the Committee for Privileges. If the claim is unopposed, the committee will generally award the claim, unless there is evidence of collusion, the peerage has been in abeyance for more than a century, or the petitioner holds less than one-third of the claim.

This doctrine is a 17th-century innovation, although it is now applied retrospectively for centuries. It cannot be applied perfectly; for example, the eighth Baron De La Warr had three surviving sons; the first died without children, the second left two daughters, and the third left a son. In modern law, the title would have fallen into abeyance between the two daughters of the second son, and nobody else would have been able to claim it even if the abeyance were settled; however, in 1597, the grandson of the third son (whose father had been re-created Baron De La Warr in 1570) claimed the title and its precedence.

In 1604, the Baron le Despencer case was the first peerage abeyance ever settled; the second was at the Restoration in 1660. Most subsequent abeyances (only a few dozen cases) were settled after a few years, in favour of the holder of the family properties; there were two periods in which long-abeyant peerages (in some cases peerages of doubtful reality) were brought back: between 1838 and 1841 and between 1909 and 1921. The Complete Peerage reports that only baronies have been called out of abeyance, although the Earldom of Cromartie was called out of a two-year abeyance in 1895.

It is entirely possible for a peerage to remain in abeyance for centuries. For example, the Barony of Grey of Codnor was in abeyance for over 490 years between 1496 and 1989, and the Barony of Hastings was similarly in abeyance for over 299 years from 1542 to 1841. Some other baronies became abeyant in the 13th century, and the abeyance has yet to be terminated. The only modern examples of titles other than a barony that have yet gone into abeyance are the earldom of Arlington and the viscountcy of Thetford, which are united, and (as noted above) the earldom of Cromartie.

It is no longer straightforward to claim English peerages after long abeyances. In 1927, a parliamentary Select Committee on Peerages in Abeyance recommended that no claim should be considered where the abeyance has lasted more than 100 years, nor where the claimant lays claim to less than one third of the dignity. The Barony of Grey of Codnor was treated as an exception to this principle, as a claim to it had been submitted prior to these recommendations being made to the Sovereign.

It is common, but incorrect, to speak of peerage dignities which are dormant (i.e. unclaimed) as being in abeyance.

=== Peerages called out of abeyance by year of initial abeyance ===
- 1426: Baron Camoys, called out of abeyance in 1839 after 413 years.
- 1455: Baron Cromwell, called out of abeyance after 35 years; again in 1923 after 426 years.
- 1481: Baron Mowbray, called out of abeyance after 2 years; again in 1878 after 100 years and 3 months.
- 1496: Baron Grey of Codnor, called out of abeyance in 1989 after 493 years.
- 1508: Baron de Ros, called out of abeyance after 4 years; again in 1806 (after 119 years), in 1943 (after 4 years) and in 1958 (after 2 years).
- 1542: Baron Hastings, called out of abeyance after 299 years.
- 1557: Baron Braye, called out of abeyance after 282 years; again in 1879 after 17 years.
- 1602: Baron Strabolgi, called out of abeyance after 314 years.
- 1604: Baron le Despencer, called out of abeyance after 143 years; called out again in 1763 after 7 months and in 1788 after 7 years.
- 1616: Baron Furnivall, called out of abeyance after 31 years; again in 1913 after 136 years and in 2025 after 57 years.
- 1646: Baron Ferrers of Chartley, called out of abeyance after 31 years.
- 1660: Baron Windsor, called out of abeyance after 18 years (the length of the English Civil War); again in 1855 after 22 years.
- 1721: Baron Clinton, called out of abeyance after 29 years
- 1734: Baron Clifford, called out of abeyance after 5 years; (again in 1776 and 1833 after a year)
- 1741: Baron Ferrers of Chartley, called out of abeyance after 8 years.
- 1757: Baron Dudley, called out of abeyance after 159 years.
- 1764: Baron Botetourt, called out of abeyance after 358 years; again in 1803 after 21 years.
- 1780; Baron Willoughby de Eresby, called out of abeyance after a year; again in 1871 after a year.
- 1784: Baron Howard de Walden, called out of abeyance after 96 years; again in 2004 after five years.
- 1948: Baron Conyers and Baron Fauconberg, called out of abeyance after 64 years.

== Settling litigation ==
Abeyance can be used in cases where parties are interested in temporarily settling litigation while still holding the right to seek relief later if necessary. This may be considered a desirable outcome in cases where the party to the lawsuit is an organization with a transient membership and political perspective. The use of abeyance in such instances can allow such an organization to 'settle' with the party without officially binding its actions in the future, should a new group of decision makers within the organization choose to pursue taking the dispute to court.

For example, abeyance was used as a settlement method in a Canadian lawsuit involving the University of Victoria Students' Society (UVSS), the British Columbia Civil Liberties Association, and a campus anti-abortion club to whom the UVSS denied funding. The parties agreed to settle the lawsuit by holding the case in abeyance in return for the UVSS temporarily giving resources back to the club. With this arrangement, the anti-abortion club held on to its right to immediately reopen the case again should the UVSS deny resources to the club in the future, and the UVSS was able to avoid an expensive legal battle it did not have the will to pursue at the time. Thus, the use of abeyance provided the security of a settlement for the anti-abortion campus club, while preserving the student society's voting membership's ability to take the matter back to court should they choose in the future to deny resources to the club.

Other court cases may be held in abeyance when the issue may be resolved by another court or another event. This saves time and effort trying to resolve a dispute that may be made moot by the other events. During lawsuits related to the Patient Protection and Affordable Care Act after the Supreme Court of the United States granted certiorari in King v. Burwell, attorneys in Halbig v. Burwell requested abeyance of that case as the matter would be resolved in King and it would be a waste of time and effort to try to resolve it in the Halbig case.

== Scottish peerage law ==
Titles in the Peerage of Scotland cannot go into abeyance, because in Scottish law the eldest sister is preferred over younger sisters; sisters are not considered equal co-heirs.

== See also ==
- Coparcenary

== General and cited references ==
- Cokayne, George Edward. The Complete Peerage. ISBN 0-904387-82-8 and ISBN 0-7509-0154-3.
