= Charles Schomberg, Marquess of Harwich =

British Army officer and nobleman (1683–1713)

Charles Schomberg, Marquess of Harwich (15 December 1683 – 5 October 1713) was a British Army officer and nobleman.

He was the only son of Meinhardt Schomberg and his second wife Raugravine Caroline Elisabeth, daughter of Charles I Louis, Elector Palatine and Marie Luise von Degenfeld. His father entered the service of William III of England and was created Duke of Leinster and Earl of Bangor in 1691, before succeeding as 3rd Duke of Schomberg and Marquess of Harwich in 1693.

Lord Harwich succeeded his father as Colonel of the 8th Horse on 27 January 1711, and served in France during the War of the Spanish Succession. He died of tuberculosis while travelling from Ireland to London and was buried in Westminster Abbey.
