= Battle of Vlotho =

1638 battle of the Thirty Years' War

Coordinates: 52°10′0″N 8°50′59″E

- Part of the Thirty Years' War
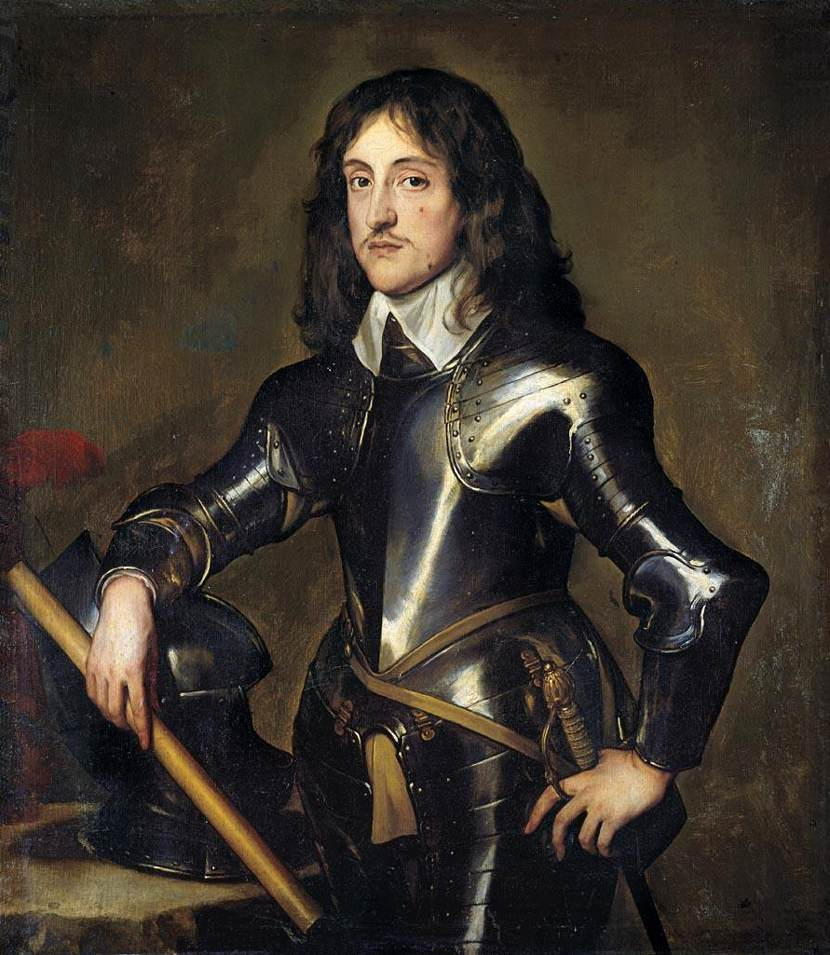
Date	17 October 1638
Location	Vlotho, County of Ravensberg (present-day North Rhine-Westphalia, Germany)
Result	Imperial victory

Belligerents
Electoral Palatinate; Kingdom of England; Swedish Empire	Holy Roman Empire

Commanders and leaders
Karl Ludwig of the Palatinate (England) Lord Craven (POW) (England) Prince Rupert (POW) (Swedish Empire) James King (Swedish Empire) Hans Christoff von Königsmarck	(Holy Roman Empire) Graf von Hatzfeldt

Strength
4,000: 1,500 infantry, 2,500 cavalry.	5,800: 1,800 infantry, 4,000 cavalry.

Casualties and losses
1,200 taken prisoner	79 casualties
- Location within North Rhine-Westphalia Vlotho (Germany)

The Battle of Vlotho was fought on 17 October 1638. It was a victory for the Imperial Army under the command of Field Marshal Melchior von Hatzfeldt, and ended the attempt by Charles I Louis, Elector Palatine, to recapture the Electoral Palatinate.

== Background ==
Frederick V, the Winter King, had died in 1632. The desire to recover the Palatinate, which had sparked English intervention in the Thirty Years' War in the previous years was at this point disregarded by most. In 1638 Charles Louis, 2nd son and heir of Frederick made one last attempt to recover his territories. Choosing as his base of operations the town of Meppen, on the Münster-East Frisian frontier, he raised a force of 4,000 men using English gold. Alongside Charles Louis were his brother Prince Rupert and a company of English gallants dedicated to the Winter Queen, including Lord Craven, and the Earl of Northampton.

To assist Charles Louis, the commander of the Swedish army Johan Banér sent Charles Louis a 1,000 strong detachment, under the command Lieutenant-General James King (a Scot who had commanded the Swedish left wing at the Battle of Wittstock in 1636). Many of these were British, such as Colonel William Vavasour.

The original plan was to form the army in Westphalia and then to advance through Hesse and to retake the Palatine. However Banér considered this to be unrealistic and persuaded the participants that they should start by besieging and capturing Lemgo, ostensibly to secure their lines of communication, but it also suited the wider war aims of the Swedes because whatever else happened during the campaign it would be a concrete loss for Banér's enemies and a gain for him.

On 15 October 1638 the Palatine-Swedish army started to besiege Lemgo, and the Imperial Field Marshal Melchior von Hatzfeldt—who had been assigned to command Imperial forces in Westphalia after his defeat at Wittstock, immediately started to assemble a relief force.

The next day this approaching force was detected by Palatine-Swedish vedettes who estimated it to be 8,000 strong, so their commanders decided to raise the siege and retreat to the Swedish fortress at Minden. The Palatines had two possible routes to Minden, they chose to take the road to Vlotho, which was shorter, but also meant that they remained on the same side of the river Weser as the Hatzfeldt. Their major problem was that whatever route they took, unless they abandoned their artillery and baggage train, Hatzfeldt's unencumbered force was going to catch up with them.

== Battle ==
The faster Imperial force managed to outpace the Palatines and cut off their path at Vlotho bridge.

The Palatines had ordered their marching column with the baggage at the front, followed by their cavalry, with the infantry and artillery at the rear. King formed the Palatine cavalry up in a defensive line on the Eiberg hillock and set off to bring up the infantry.

King's subordinate Hans von Königsmarck suggested that rather than wait for their infantry, they could send their cavalry forward up a narrow valley which would act as a defile and prevent Hatzfeldt from concentrating his forces against them. Charles Louis and Craven agreed to the plan. Three cavalry regiments under the command of Königsmarck were sent forward up the defile one behind the other, while the dragoons and the two commanders remained on the hillock awaiting the arrival of their infantry.

As soon as he saw what the Palatine cavalry was doing, Hatzfeldt ordered two of his own cavalry regiments to advance down the valley to meet the enemy. He sent a further 800 on a flanking attack, concealed by the low hills around the valley.

In the clash that followed the two leading Palatine regiments broke. The third regiment was commanded by Prince Rupert who, in an early example of a manoeuvre he would become famous for in the English Civil War, ordered a flat out charge. Hatzfeldt's cavalry were driven out of the valley. As Rupert's cavalry debouched from the defile they were hemmed in by Hatzfeldt's superior forces. Craven led the Palatine reserves — two regiments of dragoons — up the defile to support Rupert's attack, but the Imperial cavalry sent to flank the attackers closed in from behind to envelop Rupert's cavalry and Craven's reinforcements.

The position was now hopeless, and rather than reinforce failure, Königsmarck withdrew with his Swedish cavalry. It is clear from the correspondence in the Swedish archives that Lieutenant General King had managed to extract Charles Louis and his remnant forces from the field and had them under his protection in Minden throughout October and November, a matter that caused much consternation to Field Marshal Baner who sowed rumours about King preferring the Elector's to Swedish service. This was something King forcefully rejected, although he did seek instruction as to how to deal with Charles Louis and his army.

== Aftermath ==
In the opinion of William Guthrie:

Hatzfeld demonstrated a cool professionalism in this minor action, which was not in evidence at Wittstock or Jankow. The Swedish veterans King and Konigsmarck, on the other hand, outdid themselves in ineptitude. King, blamed Rupert for the defeat; the two were still feuding 10 years later. Konigsmarck escaped all censure and later became one of Torstensson's most trusted officers.

The defeat was the last gasp of the Palatine cause and English intervention in the war. Soon the start of the English Civil War prompted the return of most British soldiers and officers.

However, Guthrie has not read the Swedish sources relating to the battle. King managed to save the Elector from capture. Moreover, English intervention in the war continued throughout the 1640s with four regiments continuing to serve in the Anglo-Dutch brigade and with major success at the Siege of Hulst in 1645.
