= Frederica Mildmay, Countess of Mértola =

British peeress (1687–1751)

Frederica Mildmay
- Countess FitzWalter suo jure Countess of Mértola
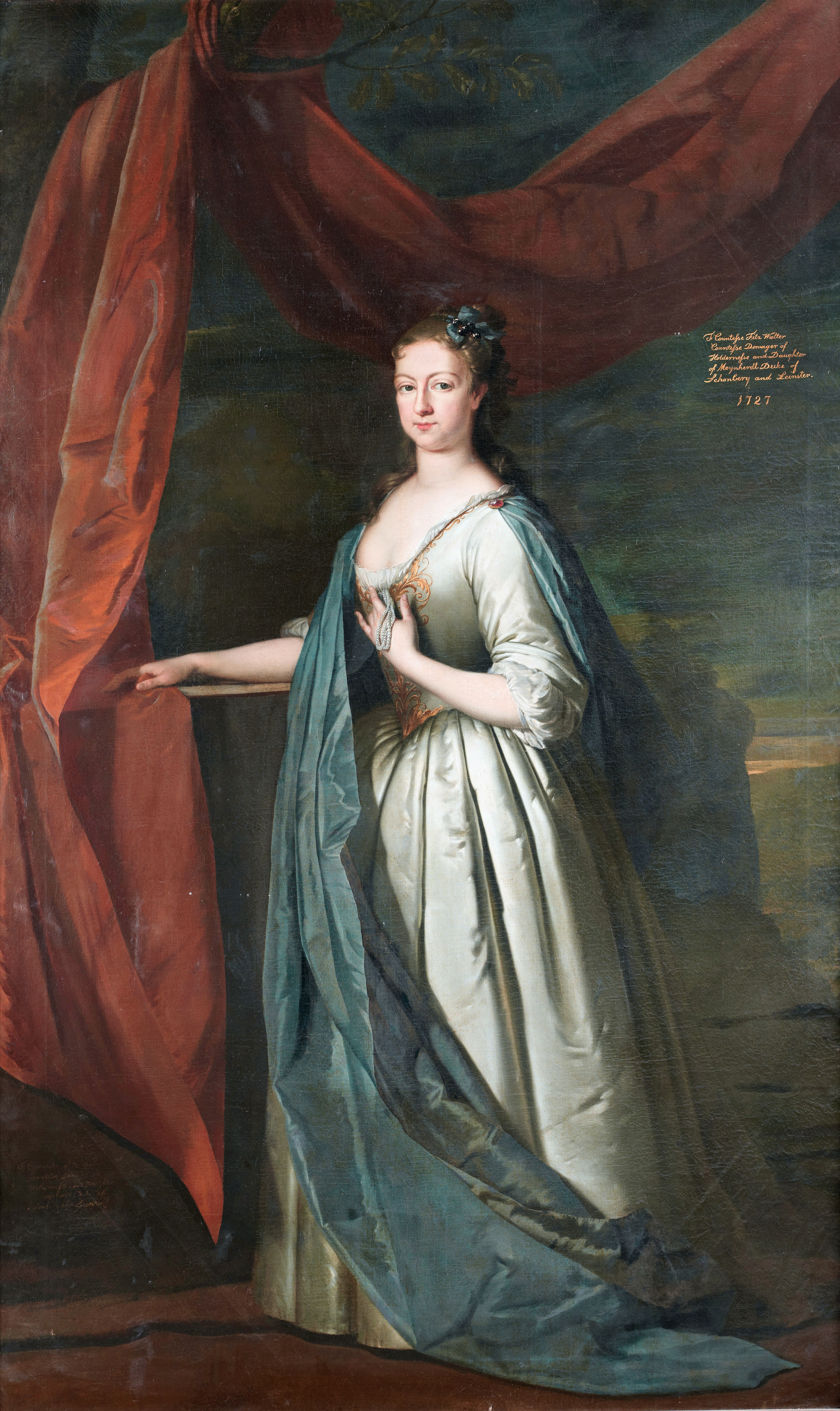
- Frederica, Countess FitzWalter (circle of Joseph Highmore, 1727)
- Full name: Frederica Susanna Mildmay (née von Schomberg)
- Born: 1687; Berlin
- Died: 7 August 1751 (aged 63–64)
- Spouses: Robert Darcy, 3rd Earl of Holderness (m. 1715–21; his death); Benjamin Mildmay, 1st Earl FitzWalter (m. 1724–51; her death)
- Issue: Robert Darcy, 4th Earl of Holderness; Caroline Kerr, Marchioness of Lothian
- Father: Meinhard von Schomberg, Herzog von Schomberg und von Leinster (1641-1719)
- Mother: Karoline Elisabeth zu Pfalz, Raugräfin zu Pfalz (1659-1696)

Frederica Susanna Mildmay, Countess FitzWalter, 3rd Countess of Mértola (née Schomberg, previously Frederica Darcy, Countess of Holderness; 1687 – 7 August 1751) was a British peeress.

== Life ==
Frederica was the eldest surviving daughter, and co-heir, of Meinhardt Schomberg, 3rd Duke of Schomberg, and his second wife, Raugravine Caroline Elisabeth, a daughter of Charles I Louis, Elector Palatine. On 26 May 1715, she married Robert Darcy, 3rd Earl of Holderness, and they had two surviving children:

- Hon. Robert Darcy (1718–1778); later 4th Earl of Holderness.
- Lady Caroline Darcy (d. 1778); who married William Kerr, 4th Marquess of Lothian.

On the death of the countess' father in 1719, she inherited his Portuguese countship of Mértola as his eldest surviving child. Her husband died in 1721 and on 18 June 1724, she married Hon. Benjamin Mildmay, who was later created Earl FitzWalter in 1730. They had one child, who died in infancy.

Via cognatic primogeniture, she was the most senior descendant of James I of England to be Protestant, but she was passed over for Sophia of Hanover, due to her descent from her grandfather Charles I Louis's morganatic marriage to Marie Luise von Degenfeld. Her cognatic heir is Anthea Theresa Lycett (born Marcia Anne Miller), Countess of Mértola, eldest daughter of Diana, Baroness Conyers and Fauconberg and Countess of Mértola.

The countess was survived by her elderly second husband; on her death, at the age of 63, she was buried in the Mildmay family vault at St Mary's Church, Chelmsford, where he was also later buried.

=== Descendants ===
Through her daughter Caroline, Frederica was the maternal grandmother of William Kerr, 5th Marquess of Lothian; a great-grandmother of Charles Lennox, 4th Duke of Richmond; a great-great-grandmother of army officer George Berkeley, Grenville Berkeley, Henry Bathurst, 4th Earl Bathurst, William Bathurst, 5th Earl Bathurst, and Seymour Thomas Bathurst; a great-great-great grandmother of Francis Seymour, 5th Marquess of Hertford, navy officer Henry Seymour, Lord William Seymour, Princess Victor of Hohenlohe-Langenburg, William FitzRoy, 6th Duke of Grafton, Augustus FitzRoy, 7th Duke of Grafton, Lord Frederick FitzRoy, and Henry Ponsonby; and a great-great-great-great grandmother of Sir Malcolm Murray-MacGregor, 4th Baronet and Evan MacGregor.

Titles of nobility
Preceded by Meinhardt Schomberg	Countess of Mértola; 1719–1751	Succeeded by Robert Darcy
