= Marie Luise von Degenfeld =

German noblewoman, Electress Palatine

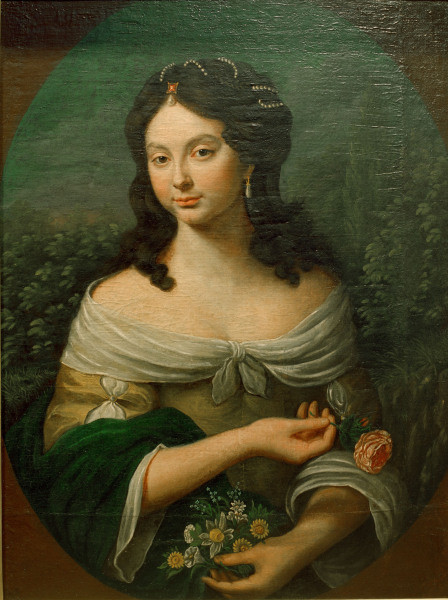
Luise von Degenfeld

Marie Susanne Luise von Degenfeld (28 November 1634 – 18 March 1677) was a German noblewoman and the morganatic second wife of Charles I Louis, Elector Palatine.

== Early life ==
Born as Baroness Marie Susanne Luise von Degenfeld in Strasbourg, she was the daughter of an impoverished German Baron, Christoph Martin von Degenfeld and Maria Anna Adelmann von Adelmannsfelden.

In 1650, she was appointed a lady-in-waiting at the Electoral Palace at Heidelberg to Charlotte of Hesse-Kassel, the consort of Charles I Louis, Elector Palatine. He was the son and heir of Frederick V, the "Winter King" of Bohemia, by Elizabeth Stuart, daughter of James I of England.

== Marriage ==
Although the marriage of the Elector and Electress was notoriously unhappy, Charlotte openly protesting that it had been contracted against her will, Luise initially declined to become the Elector's mistress. On 6 January 1658, acting on his own sovereign authority, the Prince-Elector contracted a morganatic but arguably bigamous (cf. cuius regio, eius religio) second marriage with the young Baroness von Degenfeld at Schwetzingen Castle, then a hunting lodge, midway between Heidelberg and Mannheim, Germany. From 31 December 1667 the Prince-Elector and his court accorded Luise the title of "the Raugravine" (Raugrafin), and the corresponding titles of Raugrave/Raugravine without territorial suffix, to each of her children, distinguishing them from the children of his first, dynastic marriage (which the Electress always refused to acknowledge as legally terminated), the future Elector Palatine Charles II and the future Duchess of Orléans, Elisabeth Charlotte ("Liselotte").

== Children ==
Thirteen children were born to the Elector and the Raugravine between October 1658 and May 1675, but only six of them lived to mature adulthood. The only one of her children to marry and have children of their own was the Raugravine Caroline Elisabeth (1659–1696), who married an ardent suitor, Meinhard, 3rd Duc de Schomberg, 1st Duke of Leinster in 1683, receiving 20,000 florins from Elector Charles II. When the Edict of Nantes was revoked in France, the Schombergs emigrated to England rather than convert to Catholicism.

Three of Luise's sons were killed in battle, and one was killed in a duel. The youngest, the Raugrave Karl-Moritz (1671–1702), was a favorite of his half-sister, Elizabeth Charlotte of the Palatinate (referred to as Madame), and visited her several times at the French court, once seeking to provoke a duel with her husband's lover and major-domo, the Chevalier de Lorraine. Madame's efforts to intervene on his behalf to obtain an appanage from her brother, the Elector Charles II, were rebuffed. Thus the impecunious and alcoholic Karl-Moritz died unmarried, last of the Wittelsbach raugraves.

On 26 February 1677, Charles I Louis invested his two elder sons by Luise von Degenfeld, the Raugraves Karl-Ludwig and Karl-Eduard, with the lordship of Stebbach in Kraichgau. A portion of this estate had belonged in fief to the von Gemmingen family since 1577. When it came in its entirety to the Elector Palatine in 1677 under the administration of the city of Hilsbach, he transferred his rights therein to the two raugraves.

Charles I died in 1680, followed by his son and heir by his first wife, Charles II, in 1685. The new Elector Palatine Philip William of Neuburg, a distant, Catholic relative, seized Stebbach upon Karl-Eduard's death in 1690. But in addition to several daughters, Charles I still had a living son of his second marriage, Raugrave Karl-Moritz. Thanks to the protests of his maternal uncle, Baron Ferdinand von Degenfeld, the estate was deeded over to Karl-Moritz, the last raugrave, on 27 September 1695.

Stebbach was again seized by the Elector Palatine upon the latter's death in 1702. A successful appeal against this act was made, this time on behalf of the two surviving daughters of Charles I and Luise von Degenfeld, the Raugravines Louise (1661–1733) and Amalia (1663–1709), the former of whom managed the estates of her brother-in-law, the renowned general Meinhard, 3rd Duc de Schomberg, 1st Duke of Leinster.

=== List ===
The children of Luise and the Elector Palatine Charles I Louis were:

- Charles Louis (15 October 1658 – 12 August 1688), killed in action;
- Caroline Elisabeth (19 November 1659 – 28 June 1696), married Meinhardt Schomberg, 3rd Duke of Schomberg, had four children, including Frederica Mildmay, Countess of Mértola;
- Louise (25 January 1661 – 6 February 1733);
- Louis (19 February 1662 – 7 April 1662), died in infancy;
- Amalia Elisabeth (1 April 1663 – 13 July 1709);
- George Louis (30 March 1664 – 20 July 1665), died in childhood;
- Frederica (7 July 1665 – 7 August 1674), died in childhood;
- Frederick William (25 November 1666 – 29 July 1667), died in infancy;
- Charles Edward (19 May 1668 – 2 January 1690), killed in action;
- Sophie (19 July 1669 – 28 November 1669), died in infancy;
- Charles Maurice (9 January 1671 – 13 June 1702);
- Charles August (19 October 1672 – 20 September 1691), killed in action;
- Charles Casimir (1 May 1675 – 28 April 1691), killed in a duel.

== Later life ==
Initially, Luise and the Elector continued to live under one roof with his first wife, who refused to abandon the palace. But the latter's resistance to the arrangement led to such numerous quarrels that the Elector eventually sent her back to her own family in Hesse. However, Electress Charlotte's two children remained with their father. Although his eldest daughter, Liselotte, got along well with her step-mother and younger half-siblings, the rancor between her parents eventually prompted her father's sister, Sophia, to invite Liselotte to come live with her at the court of her husband, the future Ernest Augustus, Elector of Hanover. Although relations with his second wife would not always remain free of conflict, Charles and Luise had a large progeny together and the Elector proved a doting father to all of his children. Nonetheless, in later years poor relations developed between him and his eldest son, the extremely devout Electoral Prince Charles, which apparently prevented him from entertaining the warm feelings for the Raugravine's children that his sister Liselotte felt to such an extent that she sustained an extensive, now published, correspondence with several of her half-sisters for the remainder of her life at the court of Versailles.

During her fourteenth pregnancy, the Raugravine Luise died in the castle of Friedrichsburg in Mannheim on 28 March 1677. She had been constantly pregnant during her nineteen years of marriage, giving birth almost once a year. Her widower married a third time in December 1679, again morganatically, to Elisabeth Hollander von Bernau (1659 – 8 March 1702), by whom he had a posthumous son, Charles Louis, in April 1681 who, however, died young.

In 1733, the still unmarried Louise died, whereupon one of the Raugravine's English granddaughters, Lady Maria von Schomberg (1692–1762), who had married a cousin, Count Christopher von Degenfeld-Schonberg (1689–1762), inherited Stebbach. The estate remained henceforth among the properties of the Degenfeld-Schonberg counts, even after the town's merger with Gemmingen in 1974.
