= Princess Wilhelmine Ernestine of Denmark =

Electress Palatine from 1680 to 1685

Wilhelmine Ernestine of Denmark and Norway
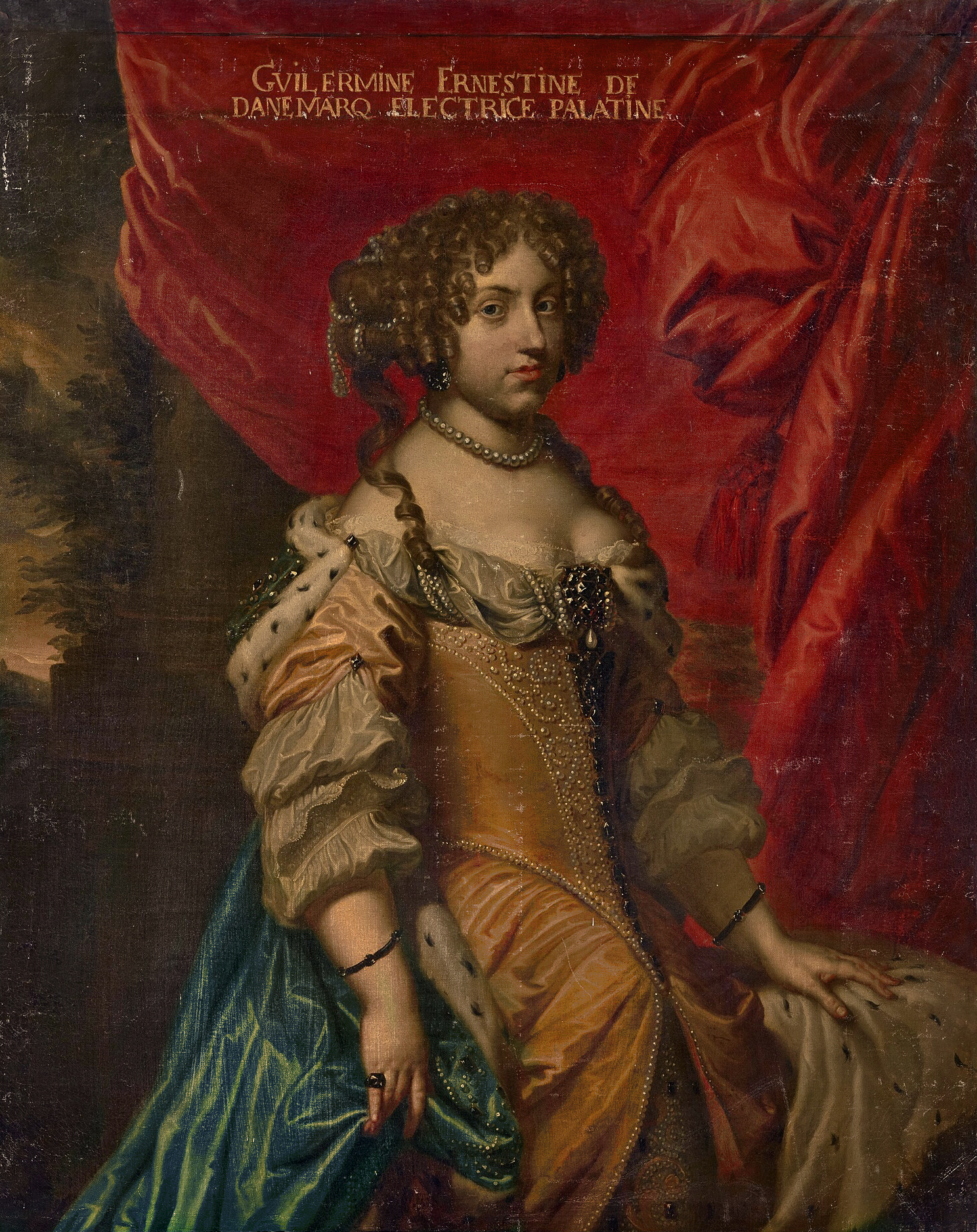
- Portrait by Pierre Mignard

Electress Palatine
- Tenure: 28 August 1680 - 26 May 1685
- Born: 20 or 21 June 1650
- Died: 22 or 23 April 1706 (aged 55)
- Spouse: Charles II, Elector of the Palatinate
- House: Oldenburg
- Father: Frederick III of Denmark
- Mother: Sophie Amalie of Brunswick-Lüneburg

Wilhelmine Ernestine of Denmark and Norway (Danish: Vilhelmine Ernestine; 20 or 21 June 1650 – 22 or 23 April 1706) was an Electress of the Palatinate. She was the third of five daughters of King Frederick III of Denmark and Sophie Amalie of Brunswick-Lüneburg.

== Biography ==
Her aunt, Electress Sophia of Hanover, arranged a marriage between Wilhelmina Ernestine and Sophia's nephew Charles, heir to the Electorate of the Palatinate. The negotiations of the marriage started in 1669. Wilhelmina Ernestine was betrothed at Sophie Amalienborg Palace in Denmark in the presence of Charles on 24 June 1671. On 14 August, Wilhelmina Ernestine left Denmark with a large Danish retinue for Heidelberg, where the wedding ceremony was conducted on 20 September 1671.

Wilhelmina Ernestine was granted a large dowry from Denmark, and she also received the towns of Germersheim and Oppenheim from her father-in-law, Elector Charles I Louis. During the Scanian War between Denmark and Sweden in 1679, Wilhelmine Ernestine loaned funds to her brother to finance the war.

The marriage was very unhappy. Charles had been forced by his father to marry her against his will and disliked the marriage from the beginning. Her shy behavior and physical appearance - she was said to have been somewhat crippled - only widened the distance between them. Wilhelmina Ernestine is not noted to have had any particular interests, she preferred solitude and a reclusive quiet life style in contrast to the active social life preferred by Charles, and she reportedly offended him by her pride over her royal status. By 1677, Charles' dislike made his father consider serious plans of a divorce, although these plans were never realized. They had no children.

On 28 August 1680, they became Elector and Electress of the Palatinate. Charles' reign was marked by his dependency on favorites. The Elector died 26 May 1685. As a widow, she lived with her sister, Dowager Electress Anna Sophie of Saxony, at Castle Lichtenburg in Saxony.

== Ancestors ==
Ancestors of Princess Wilhelmine Ernestine of Denmark

16. Christian III of Denmark
8. Frederick II of Denmark
17. Dorothea of Saxe-Lauenburg
4. Christian IV of Denmark
18. Ulrich III, Duke of Mecklenburg-Güstrow
9. Sophie of Mecklenburg-Schwerin
19. Elizabeth of Denmark
2. Frederick III of Denmark
20. John George, Elector of Brandenburg
10. Joachim Frederick, Elector of Brandenburg
21. Sophie of Liegnitz
5. Anne Catherine of Brandenburg
22. John I, Margrave of Brandenburg-Küstrin
11. Catherine of Brandenburg-Küstrin
23. Catherine of Brunswick-Wolfenbüttel
1. Wilhelmina Ernestina of Denmark
24. Ernest I, Duke of Brunswick-Lüneburg
12. William, Duke of Brunswick-Lüneburg
25. Sophie of Mecklenburg-Schwerin
6. George, Duke of Brunswick-Lüneburg
26. Christian III of Denmark (=16)
13. Dorothea of Denmark
27. Dorothea of Saxe-Lauenburg (=17)
3. Sophie Amalie of Brunswick-Lüneburg
28. George I, Landgrave of Hesse-Darmstadt
14. Louis V, Landgrave of Hesse-Darmstadt
29. Magdalene of Lippe
7. Anne Eleonore of Hesse-Darmstadt
30. John George, Elector of Brandenburg (=20)
15. Magdalene of Brandenburg
31. Elisabeth of Anhalt-Zerbst

Princess Wilhelmine Ernestine of Denmark House of Oldenburg Born: 20 or 21 June 1650 Died: 22 or 23 April 1706
Royal titles
| Preceded by Charlotte of Hesse-Kassel | Electress Palatine; 1680–1685 | Succeeded by Elizabeth Amalie of Hesse-Darmstadt |
