= Anna Margareta von Haugwitz =

Swedish countess (1622–1673)

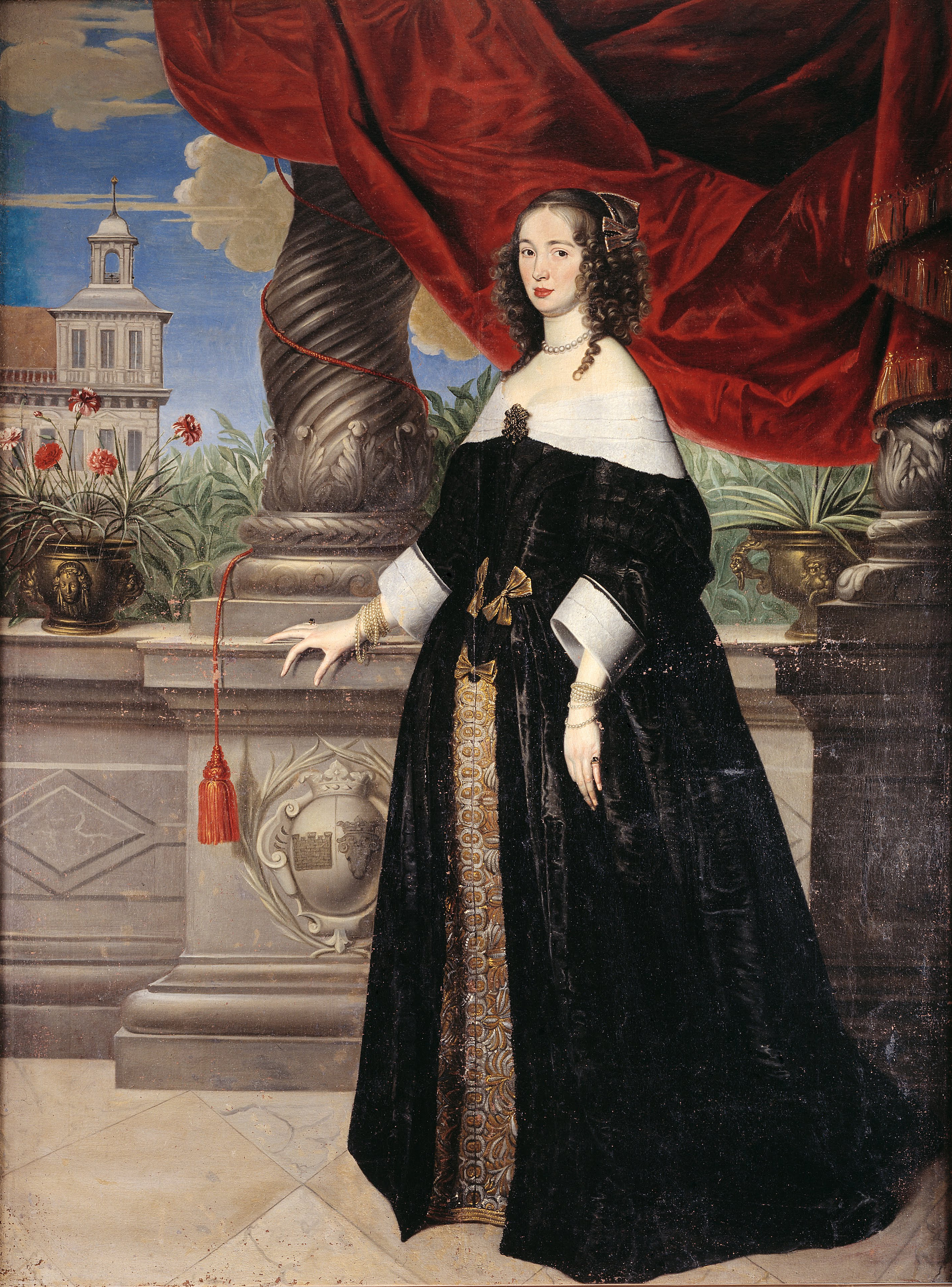
Anna Margareta von Haugwitz in 1649. She had given birth to six children by this point, of which four had died.

Anna Margareta von Haugwitz (16 January 1622 in Calbe (Saale) – 20 March 1673 in Stockholm) was a German noblewoman who became a Swedish noblewoman by marriage.

== Biography ==
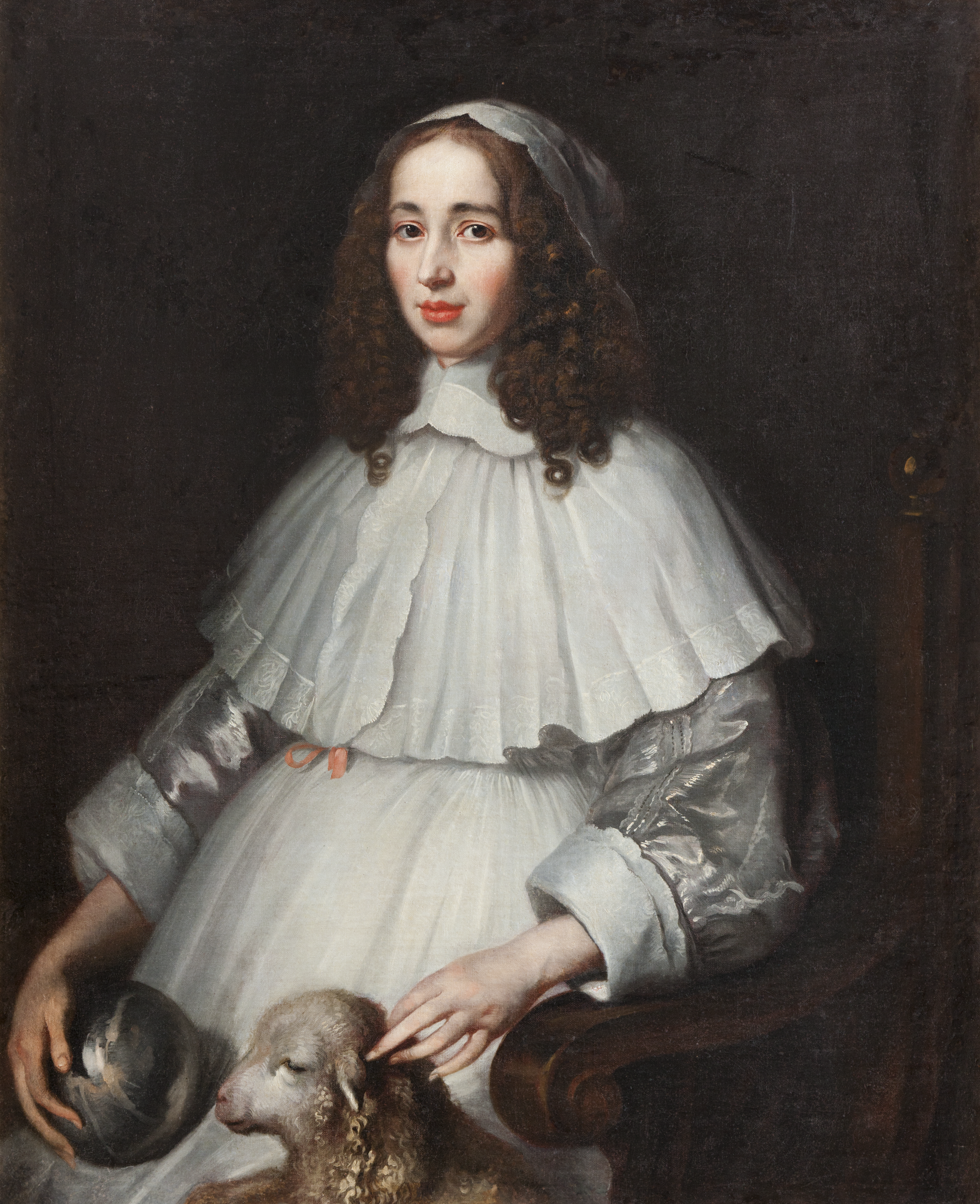
Anna Margareta von Haugwitz by Matthaeus Merian the Younger (1648 or 1651). This very intimate portrait shows the pregnant Anna Margareta with a lamb and a globe, symbols of Christian devotion and eternity.

Anna Margareta was a daughter of Balthasar Joachim von Haugwitz (d. 1626) and his wife, Sophie von Veltheim (d. 1630). She was baptized in the church of Saint Stephen.

Her father died when she was four years old, following which she went through the turmoil of the Thirty Years' War, first as a half-orphan and soon afterwards as a full orphan. In 1630, her mother and four of her five siblings were killed when imperial troops stormed Calbe; only Anna Margareta was able to escape, finding shelter in the Cistercian convent in Egeln. Later, the Countess of Löwenstein looked after her and sent her to school. In 1636, Anna Margareta became a ward of the German countess Elisabeth Juliane of Erbach, who married the Swedish commander Johan Banér that year. Anna Margareta met Carl Gustaf Wrangel in a Swedish military camp; they became engaged in May 1640 and married for love on 1 June in Saalfeld. The marriage was controversial because Carl Gustaf was a member of the powerful Wrangel family, who thought that his relationship with an untitled and poor German noblewoman was inappropriate, but the criticism of his peers did not bother him much.

Anna Margareta was frequently pregnant during her marriage, giving birth to thirteen children between 1641 and 1665, but only five of them lived to adulthood:

- Hannibal Gustav Wrangel (1641–1646), who died in early childhood
- Margarete Juliane (4 November 1642 - 1701), who was married to Nils Brahe the Younger, nephew of Per Brahe the Younger, on 21 December 1660
- Margarete Barbara (1643–1643), who died in infancy
- Achilles (1644–1648), who died in early childhood
- August Gideon (1646–1648), who died in early childhood
- Carl Phillip (1648 in Dingolfing bei München - 13 April 1668 in London)
- Hedwig Eleonora Sofia (31 August 1651 in Wrangelsburg - 1687 in Stralsund), who was married to Ernst Ludwig Freiherr von Putbus on 7 April 1678
- Charlotta Emilia (1652–1657), who died in early childhood
- Polydora Christiana (6 November 1655 - 1675), who was married to Leonard Johan Wirtenberg von Debern, a son of Arvid Wittenberg, in the summer of 1673
- Augusta Aurora (15 January 1658 - 27 January 1699), who died unmarried and without issue
- Hermann (born and died in 1661)
- Anna Louisa (born and died in 1664)
- Stillborn child (in 1665)

The marriage was a happy one, and the couple were more devoted to each other than to their children. The death of their first child and son in 1646 was not even painful for his parents, who did not attend his funeral. After the Thirty Years' War, they lived mainly at the Wrangel estates in Swedish Pomerania, where Anna Margareta died. She bequeathed a sum of money to her hometown Calbe to be paid in annual installments on her birthdays.
