= Robert Darcy =

Robert Darcy may refer to:

- Robert Darcy (Lincs MP), MP for Lincolnshire (UK Parliament constituency) in 1319
- Robert Darcy (died 1448), MP for Essex (UK Parliament constituency), Maldon and Newcastle-upon-Tyne
- Robert Darcy, 3rd Earl of Holderness (1681–1721), British peer and politician
- Robert Darcy, 4th Earl of Holderness (1718–1778), British diplomat and politician
