= James King, 1st Lord Eythin =

Scottish army officer (1589–1652)

The Lord Eythin
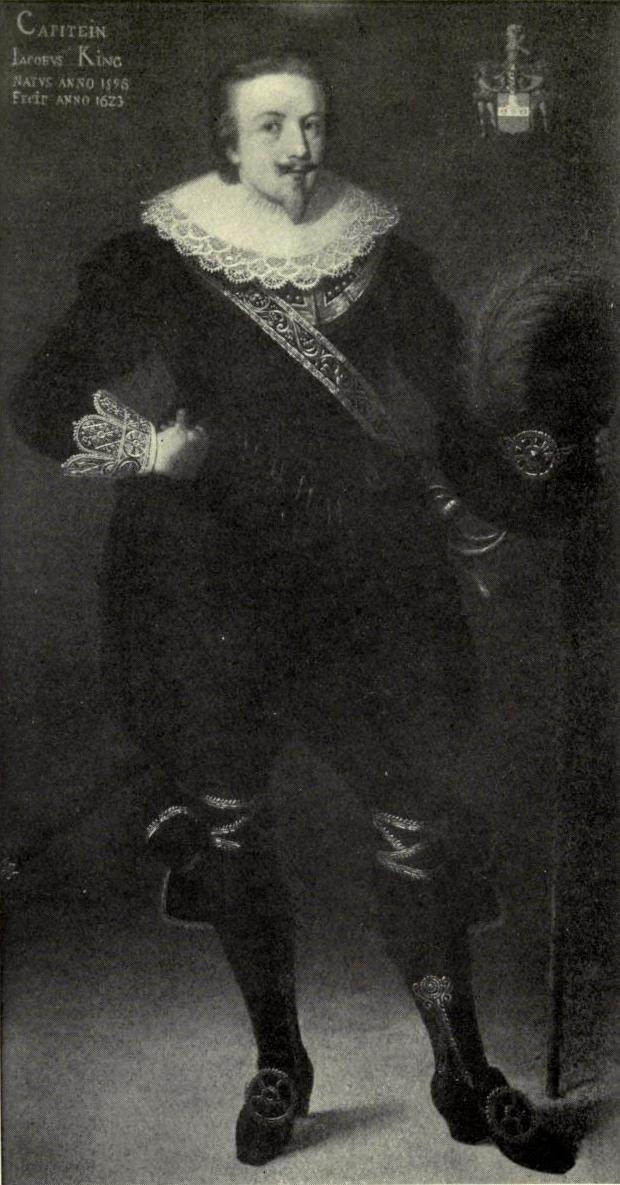
- Portrait of Eythin

Swedish military Governor of Vlotho
- In office 1632–1633

Personal details
- Born: 1589 Warbester Hoy, Orkney Islands
- Died: 9 June 1652 (aged 63) Stockholm, Sweden
- Resting place: Riddarholm Church
- Spouse(s): (1) Dilliana Van der Borchens (died c. 1634) (2) Unknown
- Children: Daughter (c. 1640-?)
- Parent(s): David King and Mary Stewart
- Occupation: Professional soldier

Military service
- Battles/wars: Thirty Years' War; Siege of Hildesheim, 1634; Battle of Wittstock; Battle of Vlotho; War of the Three Kingdoms; Siege of Newcastle; Siege of York; Battle of Marston Moor

James King, 1st Lord Eythin (1589 – 9 June 1652) was a Scottish army officer from the Orkney Islands. He served in the Swedish army from 1615 to 1639, then later supported the Royalist cause in the War of the Three Kingdoms. He died in Stockholm in 1652, and was buried in Riddarholm Church.

== Personal details ==
James King was born in 1589 on the Orkney Islands, second son of David King of Warbester Hoy, and his wife Mary Stewart, an illegitimate granddaughter of James V. He had an elder brother, John, and at least one younger brother, David (died 1634), a sister Barbara (died 1653), as well as a half-brother, William Sinclair of Seaby (1581–1633).

King was married twice, his first wife, Dilliana Van der Borchens, dying in 1634 without issue. With his second wife, whose name is not known, King had a daughter who died before him.

== Career ==
=== Swedish Service ===
In the first half of the 17th century, the Swedish army employed large numbers of Scots, including King, who was recruited sometime after 1609. While few details survive of his early career, regimental lists show he was serving under Alexander Leslie in 1615, and in 1622 became captain in a regiment commanded by Patrick Ruthven. His cousin and two brothers also joined the Swedish army, David being killed at Nördlingen in September 1634. His elder brother John later settled in Sweden, while his two nephews became naturalised Swedes and followed their father into the army.

When Sweden under Gustavus Adolphus entered the Thirty Years' War in 1630, King was Colonel of his Dutch recruits. After the death of Gustavus at Lützen in November 1632, he was appointed Swedish military Governor of Vlotho, a garrison town on the river Weser. Now part of Leslie's "Army of the Weser", which was primarily composed of Scots and Germans, he commanded three regiments at the siege of Hildesheim in 1634 and was promoted Major General.

As a Lieutenant General, in October 1636, King commanded the Swedish left at the Battle of Wittstock. His cavalry was sent on a flanking move that proved decisive to the victory but Johan Banér's Swedish infantry suffered heavy losses, for which he blamed King, leading to a feud between the two men. Following Wittstock, King supported attempts by William V, Landgrave of Hesse-Kassel to free his territories from occupation by Imperial troops, but despite initial success, they were forced back into Westphalia.

King in Germany; key locations mentioned in text

The Swedish campaign in Germany was beginning to falter, while tensions arose over suspicions that Leslie's army was more committed to the restoration of Charles I Louis as Elector Palatine, than they were to Sweden. These concerns were not unfounded, since in early 1636, Leslie declared that should the Swedes make peace with the Holy Roman Emperor, the Army of the Weser would transfer to the service of Charles Louis. (Note: An understanding of 17th century military practice may help explain Swedish concerns. All armies of the period were multi-ethnic, the vast majority of soldiers on both sides of the Thirty Years' War being German. Although Scots and English served as private volunteers or mercenaries, and were subject to Swedish orders and discipline, their recruitment had to be approved by Charles I, and they remained his subjects. Charles' primary objective was to use these troops to reinstate his brother-in-law, Charles I Louis as Elector Palatine, an outcome shared by many senior Scots and English officers, but not necessarily Sweden.)

By 1638, political and religious differences between Charles I and his Covenanter opponents in Scotland made civil war increasingly likely, prompting Leslie and many other Scots to return home. King remained, and was given temporary command of the Army of the Weser. Along with some new recruits from England led by Lord Craven and Charles Louis, this force was beaten at the Battle of Vlotho in October 1638.

Although Vlotho was a defeat, modern research suggests it was not nearly as comprehensive as claimed by Imperial reports. King managed to extricate Charles Louis along with most of his troops, and made it back to his base at Minden. Several senior officers were taken prisoner, including Lord Craven, King's cousin James, and Charles Louis' younger brother, Prince Rupert of the Rhine. In the recriminations that followed, King was accused of favouring the Palatine cause over that of Sweden, a charge he denied.

King wrote to the Swedish Chancellor, Axel Oxenstierna, asking for instructions on how to deal with Charles Louis and his army, but while acknowledging his good service, Oxenstierna still believed he was too loyal to the Palatine cause. (Note: As a direct, if illegitimate, descendant of James V, King was distantly related to both Charles Louis and Charles I through his mother. In an era when people placed great emphasis on family connections, such links were significant.) He was recalled to Stockholm and given a knighthood, before asking to be released from Swedish service in 1639.

=== Wars of the Three Kingdoms ===
Like many others, the outbreak of the Bishops' Wars in 1639 presented King with a dilemma. Although unwilling to fight against Leslie, a long-time friend and comrade, or his native land, King was equally reluctant to oppose Charles I, his king and distant relative. His two surviving wills also indicate that unlike most Scots, who belonged to the Presbyterian Church of Scotland, King may have been a Catholic or Lutheran, as both documents invoke the Holy Trinity, something uncommon in Scottish testaments of the period.

King sat out the 1639 and 1640 Bishops' Wars in Hamburg, where Charles I provided him an annual retainer of £1,000 and employed him as a military agent. (Note: King made his service conditional on receipt of this retainer, although it was never actually paid.) On returning to Scotland in 1641, he faced charges for his allegedly unpatriotic behaviour, but with Leslie speaking on his behalf, these were dismissed by the Scottish Parliament. When the First English Civil War began in August 1642, King was created "Lord Eythin" (Note: The title derives from the River Ythan in Aberdeenshire, where King owned property.) by Charles I and sent to The Hague to help Queen Henrietta Maria recruit soldiers and purchase munitions. Despite this, it was not until December that King agreed to accept a Royalist command.

Landing at Bridlington in February 1643, he was appointed Lieutenant General to the Marquess of Newcastle, Royalist commander in Northern England. Over the next year, King acted as Newcastle's deputy, although he was viewed as excessively cautious. Suspicions persisted as to his commitment to the Royalist cause, particularly after Scotland joined the war in alliance with Parliament in August 1643. When Leslie entered England in early 1644 with a Covenanter army, King held Newcastle against him, but the ease with which the Scots were able to march south raised further doubts about his reliability within the Royalist high command.

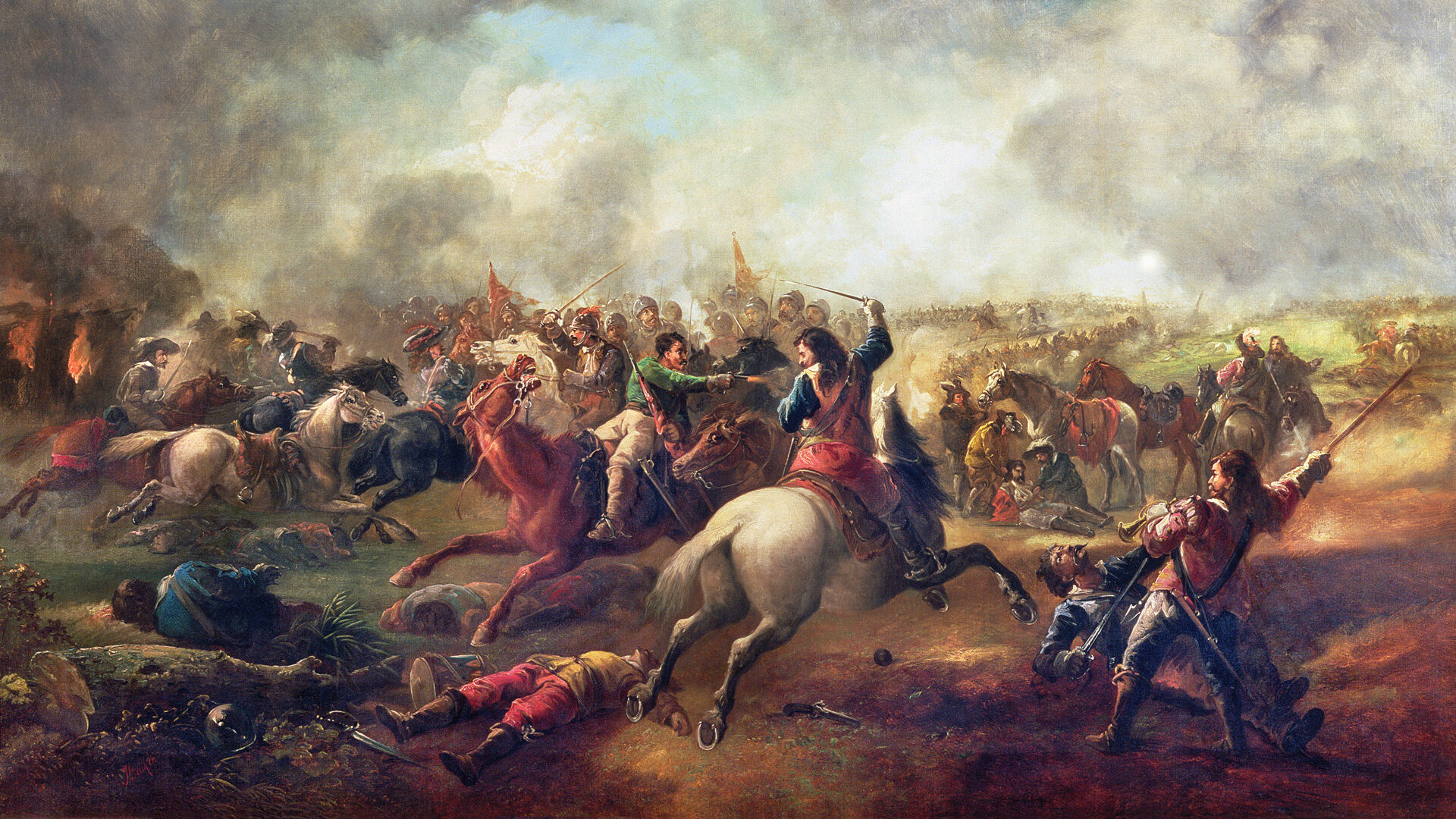
Fought against King's advice, defeat at Marston Moor ended Royalist control of Northern England

In April 1644, King and Newcastle were besieged in York by a combined Covenanter–Parliamentarian army. On 1 July 1644, they were relieved by Prince Rupert, who next day ordered the York garrison to join him on Marston Moor, and launch an attack on their opponents. Although Rupert was under pressure to achieve a quick result, both King and Newcastle felt the plan was hasty and ill-advised, King reminding Rupert of his defeat at Vlotho, allegedly caused by his impetuosity.

In the ensuing Battle of Marston Moor, the Royalist army was destroyed, with Newcastle and King among the last to leave the field. When they met up with Prince Rupert next day, it led to a bitter quarrel over responsibility for the defeat. Allegedly prompted by King, Newcastle resigned his command and took ship for Hamburg, accompanied by King and many senior officers.

A furious Prince Rupert accused King of treason, who returned to Sweden in 1645 and was created Baron Sandshult. After Charles I surrendered to his opponents in April 1646, the Covenanter army was demobilised, and Leslie contacted King for help in transferring 10,000 of these troops into Swedish service, a negotiation that ultimately came to nothing. In 1649, the exiled Charles II of England asked him to petition the Swedish government in support of an expedition to Scotland led by Montrose. This landed in the Orkney Islands, hoping to take advantage of King's local connections, but the latter never left Sweden. In the May 1650 Treaty of Breda, the Covenanter government agreed to restore Charles II to the throne, but he was forced to abandon Montrose, who was captured and later executed in Edinburgh. King died in Stockholm on 9 June 1652 and was given a state funeral in the Riddarholm Church, burial place of the Swedish kings.

== Sources ==
- The Will of James King (notarial copy), Aberdeen University Library Special Collections, MS2957/5/4/1, 20 April 1651
- The Will of James King (notarial copy), Nottinghamshire Archives DD/4P/41/5, 10 June 1646
- Certificate of General King upon arms sent to England, The National Archives at Kew, SP 81/47, f.102, 28 June 1639
- Berg, Jonas; Lagercrantz, Bo. "Scots in Sweden – Seventeenth Century – Part 1". electricscotland.com.
- Bergh, Severin, ed. (1895). Svenska Riksrådets Protokoll, vol. 7, 1637-1639 (in Swedish). Stockholm.
- Murdoch, Steve; Wales, Tim (2009). "King, James, Lord Eythin (1589–1652)". Oxford Dictionary of National Biography (online ed.). Oxford University Press. doi:10.1093/ref:odnb/15566. (Subscription, Wikipedia Library access or UK public library membership required.)
- Murdoch, Steve; Zickermann, Kathrin; Marks, Adam (2012). "The Battle of Lemgo, 17 October 1638: An Empirical Re-evaluation". Northern Studies. 43: 71–109.
- Murdoch, Steve; Zickermann (2023). "The Battle of Wittstock 1636: Conflicting Reports on a Swedish Victory in Germany". Militärhistorisk Tidskrift: 81–94.
- Murdoch, Steve; Grosjean, Alexia (2014). Alexander Leslie and the Scottish Generals of the Thirty Years' War, 1618-1648. Routledge. ISBN 978-1848934672.
- Murdoch, Steve; Grosjean, Alexia (2004). "King, James SSNE 2814". University of St Andrews - Institute for Historical Research.
- Murdoch, Steve (2006). Network North: Scottish Kin, Commercial and Covert Associations in Northern Europe, 1603-1746. Brill. ISBN 978-9004146648.
- Oxenstierna, Axel (1898). Rikskansleren Axel Oxenstiernas Skrifter Och Brefvexling (in Swedish). Stockholm.
- Royle, Trevor (2004). Civil War: The Wars of the Three Kingdoms 1638–1660. Abacus. ISBN 978-0-3491-1564-1.
