= Christiana Oxenstierna =

Swedish noble (1661–1701)

Christiana Juliana Oxenstierna (23 September 1661 – 27 February 1701) was a Swedish noble. She was the center of a great social scandal when she married a non-noble against her family's consent. Her case caused a debate about the law for marriage between nobles and non-nobles.

== Biography ==
She was the daughter of statesman and marshal Count Gabriel Gabrielsson Oxenstierna (d. 1673) and Countess Maria Christiana von Löwenstein und Scharfeneck (d. 1672; in turn she was the only surviving daughter of Countess Elisabeth Juliana of Erbach –later wife of the Swedish Field Marshal Johan Banér– in her second marriage) and sister of Count Gustaf Adolf Oxenstierna. As an orphan, she was taken care of by her paternal aunt, Countess Anna af Dohna.

The vicar (since 1687) of the French Lutheran church in Stockholm, Nikolaus Bergius, was lodged in the palace of Dohna. Bergius suffered from severe depression and Dohna asked her niece to comfort him. Oxenstierna and Bergius fell in love and Bergius proposed, but Oxenstierna declined, as she knew she would be an outcast from her family and the nobility if she consented. Her family found out and banned every plans of a marriage. Bergius was separated from her in 1688–89. Their relationship was eventually taken up again. After a priest had agreed to conduct the ceremony, Oxenstierna and Bergius were married in 1691. The marriage was kept a secret, and she remained with her unknowing family. In 1692, she became pregnant; she moved to her spouse, and everything was made public.

It became a great scandal. Her family contested the legality of the marriage, and her brother, the count, reported them to Hovrätten, to the Swedish House of Lords and presented the monarch with an appeal to bring the couple to court for committing a criminal act by breaking:

common law, guardian law, noble privileges, the law of the church as well as Your Majesty’s law of illegal marriages", by: "having dared to harm the rank of nobility by such a illegal act, in the Kingdom as well as abroad, and damaging its privileges, of such a degree that, if it is not made an example of, would unavoidably have the scandalous effect to break the public order, that a noblewoman, regardless of what kind, should be liberated.

He also suggested that the law should be enforced against marriages between nobles and non-nobles (1693). Christiana Oxenstierna replied to her brother:

If You wish Your hatred and persecution to last as long as our lives, so it will; You will with no doubt be spared the burden soon enough and harm Yourself as much as others; I will not loose a thing thereby. If You will be as a Christian, it will be as dear to me as the wish that you will give your children treasures which rust and moths can not alter, and that we will one day meet were a Count and a master Bergius will weigh as much.

The court of the Swedish House of Lords made the verdict that a serious crime had been committed, but as the King had commented that the matter was but a private affair, the case was not pursued further.

She broke off her contact with her family and the nobility and spent the rest of her life with her spouse, spending her time as a teacher for poor children. In 1701, she died in childbirth, giving her spouse all her assets in her will, because their four children (three sons and a daughter) all died in infancy. Her family demanded she be buried discreetly, and denied her a place in her father's crypt, but as she was the only person to have repaired and taken care of the crypt, her right to be buried there could not be denied. At her funeral, "Two Countesses Oxenstierna and one Miss Banér as well as other noblewomen prepared her corpse and lifter her with their own hands in to the coffin".

== In culture ==
In 1704, as a reply to the debate and slander which were still very much alive about her controversial person, her former spouse published her biography: Kort Beskrifning af then Högwälborna Frus, Fru Christina Juliana Oxenstiernas Lefwernes Lopp (A description of the life of the honorable lady, lady Christina Juliana Oxenstierna) (1704). It was reprinted by Pehr Adolph Sondén as: Minne af Christiana Juliana Oxenstjerna (Memory of Christina Juliana Oxenstierna) (1836).

== See also ==
- Marie Grubbe
- Margareta Brahe
