= Elisabet Juliana Banér =

German noble (1600–1640)

- Born: 22 January 1600; Arolsen, County of Waldeck, Holy Roman Empire
- Died: 29 May 1640 (aged 40); Saalfeld, Duchy of Saxe-Altenburg, Holy Roman Empire
- Buried: Riddarholmen Church, Stockholm
- Spouses: Georg Louis of Löwenstein-Scharfeneck (m. 1620; died 1633) Johan Banér (m. 1636)
- Issue: 2
- Father: George III, Count of Erbach-Breuberg
- Mother: Countess Maria of Barby-Mühlingen

Elisabet Juliana Banér (née of Erbach; 22 January 1600 – 29 May 1640), was a German noble, married to the Swedish Field Marshal Johan Banér in 1636. She is considered to have wielded a certain influence upon Banér and the Swedish army during the Thirty Years' War.

She was the daughter of George III, Count of Erbach-Breuberg and his fourth wife, Countess Maria of Barby-Mühlingen.

== Life ==
In Arolsen on 2 March 1620, Elisabeth Juliana married Count Georg Louis of Löwenstein-Scharfeneck. They had two children:

- Maria Christina (Padua, 20 November 1625 – Stockholm, 7 October 1672), married on 1 May 1644 to Gabriel Gabrielsson Oxenstierna, Count of Korsholm and Wasa; their daughter Christiana Juliana Oxenstierna was the center of a great social scandal when she married the non-noble vicar Nikolaus Bergius against her family’s consent. Her case caused a debate about the law for marriage between nobles and non-nobles.
- Berthold Louis (Basel, 22 February 1628 – Basel, 4 August 1628).

During her first marriage, she acted as a guardian of Anna Margareta von Haugwitz.

As a widow in 1633, she nursed the first German spouse of Banér, Katarina Elisabet von Pfuel, (former lady in waiting of Maria Eleonora of Brandenburg) at her death bed; Pfuel is said to have asked the two to marry at her death, which they did the same year, on 25 July 1636 in Werbeskans.

She has been described as: Excellent by her sense, goodness and ability. She was the good angel of Banér, and directed him toward leniency and calm where it was possible. The army respected her as a mother.

== Death ==
She died of a fever during the famine war at Saalfeld. Johan Banér, devastated by her death, considered abandoning his posts, but was persuaded to stay. Her remains were carried with great splendor to Sweden and buried in the Banér family crypt.
