= Princess Charlotte of Hesse-Kassel =

Electress Palatine from 1650 to 1657

Charlotte of Hesse-Kassel
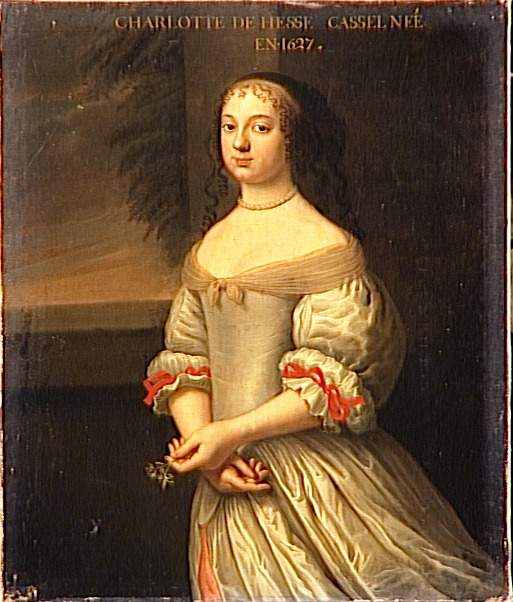
- Princess Charlotte in 1650

Electress Palatine
- Tenure: 22 February 1650 – 14 April 1657
- Born: 20 November 1627; Kassel, Germany
- Died: 26 March 1686 (aged 58); Heidelberg Castle, Heidelberg, Germany
- Spouse: Charles I Louis, Elector Palatine (m. 1650; div. 1657)
- Issue: Charles II, Elector Palatine; Elisabeth Charlotte, Duchess of Orléans
- House: Hesse-Kassel
- Father: William V, Landgrave of Hesse-Kassel
- Mother: Amalie Elisabeth of Hanau-Münzenberg
- Religion: Calvinism

Charlotte of Hesse-Kassel (20 November 1627 – 26 March 1686), was a German princess of the House of Hesse-Kassel and by marriage Electress Palatine during 1650–1657 as the first wife of Charles I Louis, although the validity of the divorce was disputed. Through her daughter Elisabeth Charlotte, Duchess of Orléans, she was the direct ancestress of House of Orléans and the Houses of Habsburg-Lorraine and Habsburg-Este.

== Life ==
Born in Kassel, Charlotte was the seventh child and fourth (but second surviving) daughter of William V, Landgrave of Hesse-Kassel and his wife, Countess Amalie Elisabeth of Hanau-Münzenberg. She is said to have been a beautiful, but very vain and intellectually undemanding young woman.

=== Marriage ===
At the urging of her widowed mother, she married on 22 February 1650 at Heidelberg Castle with Charles I Louis, Elector Palatine, the son of the late "Winter King" of Bohemia, who only a few months earlier by the Peace of Westphalia after decades of exile returned to a devastated Electoral Palatinate, the reconstruction of which he set out with great energy. However, Charlotte did not reciprocate the love and attentions of her bridegroom, but instead confessed that she “did not like to take him”. Dowager Landgravine Amalie Elisabeth had already warned Charles I Louis that her daughter was cold-tempered and stubborn. Charlotte, in turn, soon felt that her husband was ten years her senior and that she was being persecuted and monitored with unjustified jealousy. The marriage with Charles I Louis became very unhappy and disputes soon arose.

Despite the marital disputes and to the joy of the Electoral Palatinate, Charlotte gave birth three children in quick succession: Charles (born 31 March 1651 and later Elector Palatine), Elisabeth Charlotte (born 27 May 1652 and by marriage Duchess of Orléans) and Frederick (born 12 May 1653, died 13 May 1653 aged 1 day).

After the birth of her third child, the Electress Palatine expelled her husband from the bedchamber and refused to resume their conjugal duties. Charles I Louis accused his wife of having ridden and hunting too often, as well as being addicted to gambling and excessive cleaning. Charlotte, who was prone to tantrums and loud scenes, provoked her husband, who finally took one of her ladies-in-waiting, Baroness Marie Luise von Degenfeld as his official mistress; this event led to fits of jealousy by Charlotte, which the Elector Palatine responded to with domestic violence.

=== Divorce ===
Due to his princely position and church belief, Charles I Louis couldn't get a divorce without Charlotte's consent, although he tried again and again in vain despite her disobedient, stubborn, morose and unruly demeanor. Unlike her ancestress Christine of Saxony, who in 1540 accepted the morganatic second marriage of her husband Philip I, Landgrave of Hesse (who subsequently fathered children with both women), Charlotte strictly refused to this. Charles I Louis, as the owner of the highest executive and judicial power in the Electoral Palatinate, finally on 14 April 1657 decided to unilaterally and officially divorce his wife and proclaimed this publicly. Then he determined his court preacher to bless the wedding with his mistress Marie Luise von Degenfeld as a morganatic marriage; however, Marie Luise and her brother had insisted on a regular and equal marriage. Unlike the Electress Palatine, Marie Luise was gentle and submissive. Between 1658 and 1675, she bore the Elector 13 children; they received the title of 'Raugrave', but dynastically were considered illegitimate and excluded from the line of succession.

Charlotte initially didn't return to Kassel after her "divorce" but lived in a wing of Heidelberg Castle, still hoping that her marital bond could be restored. Little is known about her relationship with her two surviving children, Charles and Elisabeth Charlotte. Her daughter was sent by her father to live with his sister Sophia at her court in Hanover in 1659, apparently to remove the child from her mother's sphere of influence. According to another opinion, Charles I Louis send his daughter to Hanover to spare her from the marital disputes. Sophia, who had lived at the Heidelberg court for a few years prior to her marriage, had seen it enough: she hated and despised her sister-in-law and was happy to help her brother take her daughter away from Charlotte, presumably to persuade her to return to Kassel. The only one at the Heidelberg court who openly sided with Charlotte was her eldest sister-in-law, Elisabeth.

There are two touching letters from Charlotte to her daughter from the time she was traveling to Hanover, and several others to her tutor, in which she inquired about the child's condition and complained that she was no longer getting an answer. It's likely that Elisabeth Charlotte's letters were withheld from her mother in order to break off contact between each other. After Charlotte finally left Heidelberg in June 1663, her daughter was allowed to return to the Palatinate court. The two only met again many years later in two encounters in 1681 and 1683.

=== Later years and death ===
After Marie Luise von Degenfeld died in 1677 following complication from her 14th pregnancy, Charles I Louis tried in vain to obtain the consent of his first wife to an official divorce so that he could marry again equally and ensure the succession of the Electoral Palatinate, since the marriage of his eldest and only legitimate son, the Electoral Prince Charles with Princess Wilhelmine Ernestine of Denmark had been childless for seven years. However, Charlotte firmly refused.

Charles I Louis died on 28 August 1680 and was succeeded by his son Charles II. Once her son took the government, Charlotte immediately returned to Heidelberg and took her place as Dowager Electress Palatine, but remained ill-tempered and difficult.

After the death of her son on 26 May 1685, Charlotte retired to an apartment in Neuburg Abbey, where she lived on a meager pension; however, she continue to visit Heidelberg Castle, where she died ten months later, on 26 March 1686 aged 58.

=== Charlotte from the perspective of Sophia of the Palatinate ===
Charlotte was considered difficult and stubborn. Her sister-in-law Sophia (who, however, may not have been entirely objective, but seems to have had a complete aversion to Charlotte) describes her as vain, superficial and a bit stupid. In her memoirs, Sophia also tells of the marriage drama and the arguments at the electoral court after Charlotte found a box with two rings and two letters with the elector's promise of marriage to Marie Luise von Degenfeld and vice versa:

This enraged her, to which her temperament tended anyway, and made her make a terrible noise. She had my sister and me called; Degenfeld had in turn notified the Elector, and when we entered we saw a very unusual scene. The Elector stood in front of his lover to fend off the blows she might have received from his wife, he walked back and forth in the room and had all the jewelry in her hands. Full of anger, she approached us and shouted: "Princesses, this is the whore's wages, this is not for me!" I couldn't help laughing at this complaint, and so blurted out that the Electress was infected by it and began to laugh too. But a moment later she was angry again when the Lord Elector told her to return the stones to whoever they belonged to. She tossed them across the room and shouted: "If they shouldn't be mine, there they are!"

When Charlotte, after her death, was dressed for burial, Sophia commented:

"...It will be the first time that she was dressed without attacking or hitting someone."

== Ancestry ==
Ancestors of Princess Charlotte of Hesse-Kassel

8. William IV, Landgrave of Hesse-Kassel
4. Maurice, Landgrave of Hesse-Kassel
9. Sabine of Württemberg
2. William V, Landgrave of Hesse-Kassel
10. Johann Georg I of Solms-Laubach
5. Agnes of Solms-Laubach
11. Margarete of Schönburg-Glauchau
1. Landgravine Charlotte of Hesse-Kassel
12. Philipp Ludwig I, Count of Hanau-Münzenberg
6. Philip Louis II of Hanau-Münzenberg
13. Magdalene of Waldeck-Wildungen
3. Amalie Elisabeth of Hanau-Münzenberg
14. William the Silent
7. Countess Catharina Belgica of Nassau
15. Charlotte de Bourbon

== Bibliography ==
- Robert Geerdts (ed.): Die Mutter der Könige von Preußen und England. Memoiren und Briefe der Kurfürstin Sophie von Hannover(in German), life documents of past centuries 8, Munich Munich 1913.
- Wolfgang von Moers-Messmer: Heidelberg und seine Kurfürsten. Die große Zeit der Geschichte Heidelbergs als Haupt- und Residenzstadt der Kurpfalz (in German), Ubstadt-Weiher 2001.
- Van der Cruysse, Dirk (1997). "Madame sein ist ein ellendes Handwerck" : Liselotte von der Pfalz - eine deutsche Prinzessin am Hof des Sonnenkönigs (in German) (3rd ed.). Munich: Piper. ISBN 3-492-22141-6.. Translated French by Inge Leipold.
- Leitner, Thea (1993). Skandal bei Hof (in German). Wien: Ueberreuter. ISBN 3-8000-3492-1.

Royal titles
Preceded by Maria Anna of Austria	Electress Palatine; 22 February 1650 – 14 April 1657	Succeeded by Wilhelmina Ernestine of Denmark
