= Benjamin Mildmay, 1st Earl FitzWalter =

British politician (1672–1756)

The Right Honourable The Earl FitzWalter PC

First Lord of Trade
- In office May 1735 – June 1737
- Monarch: George II
- Prime Minister: Sir Robert Walpole
- Preceded by: The Earl of Westmorland
- Succeeded by: The Lord Monson

Treasurer of the Household
- In office 1736–1755
- Monarch: George II
- Prime Minister: Sir Robert Walpole; The Earl of Wilmington; Hon. Henry Pelham; The Duke of Newcastle
- Preceded by: The Lord De La Warr
- Succeeded by: The Lord Berkeley of Stratton

Personal details
- Born: 27 December 1672
- Died: 29 February 1756 (aged 83) London
- Spouse: Lady Frederica Schomberg (1688–1751)

Benjamin Mildmay, 1st Earl FitzWalter PC (27 December 1672 – 29 February 1756), styled The Honourable Benjamin Mildmay until 1728 and known as The Lord FitzWalter between 1728 and 1730, was a British politician. He served as First Lord of Trade between 1735 and 1737 and as Treasurer of the Household between 1737 and 1755.

== Background ==
Mildmay was a younger son of Benjamin Mildmay, 17th Baron FitzWalter, by the Honourable Catherine, daughter of William Fairfax, 3rd Viscount Fairfax of Emley.

He was one of the original backers of the Royal Academy of Music, establishing a London opera company which commissioned numerous works from Handel, Bononcini and others.

== Political career ==
Mildmay served as Commissioner of Excise between 1720 and 1728. The latter year he succeeded his elder brother in the barony of FitzWalter and took his seat in the House of Lords.

In 1730, he was created Viscount Harwich, in the County of Essex, and Earl FitzWalter. In 1735, he was sworn of the Privy Council and appointed First Lord of Trade under Sir Robert Walpole, a post he held until 1737, and then served as Treasurer of the Household between 1736 and 1755. He was also Lord-Lieutenant of Essex from 1741 to 1756.

== Personal life ==
Lord FitzWalter married Lady Frederica Susanna, daughter of Meinhardt Schomberg, 3rd Duke of Schomberg and widow of Robert Darcy, 3rd Earl of Holderness, in 1724. They had no children. She died in August 1751. Lord FitzWalter died in London in February 1756, aged 83. The viscountcy and earldom died with him, while the barony fell into abeyance.

The barony of FitzWalter was brought out of abeyance for the descendants of his sister Mary; once for Henry FitzWalter Plumptre, son of John Bridges Plumptre and Elizabeth Wright in 1924; and again, in 1953, for his nephew, Fitzwalter Brook Plumptre.

Political offices
Preceded by The Earl of Westmorland	First Lord of Trade; 1735–1737	Succeeded by The Lord Monson
Preceded by The Lord De La Warr	Treasurer of the Household; 1737–1755	Succeeded by The Lord Berkeley of Stratton
Honorary titles
Preceded by The Earl of Thomond	Lord-Lieutenant of Essex; 1741–1756	Succeeded by The Earl of Rochford
Peerage of England
Preceded by Charles Mildmay	Baron FitzWalter; 1728–1756	In abeyance Title next held by Henry Plumptre
