= Raugravine Caroline Elisabeth =

German noblewoman (1659–1696)

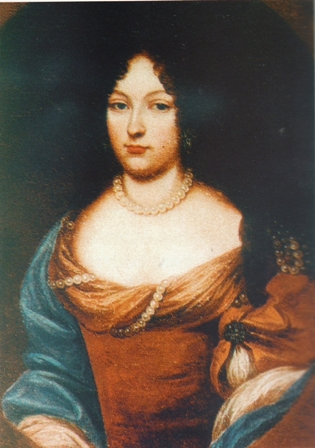
- Raugravine Caroline Elisabeth (unknown painter)
- Full name: Karoline Elisabeth Raugräfin zu Pfalz
- Born: 19 November 1659; Heidelberg
- Died: 7 July 1696 (aged 36–37); London
- Spouse: Meinhardt Schomberg, 3rd Duke of Schomberg
- Issue: Charles Schomberg, Marquess of Harwich; Lady Caroline Schomberg; Frederica Mildmay, Countess of Mértola; Lady Mary Schomberg
- Father: Charles I Louis, Elector Palatine
- Mother: Marie Luise von Degenfeld

Raugravine Caroline Elisabeth (19 November 1659, Heidelberg – 7 July 1696, London) was a German noblewoman and daughter of Charles I Louis, Elector Palatine.

== Life ==
Caroline was born in Heidelberg as a daughter of Charles I Louis, Elector Palatine from his morganatic marriage with Marie Luise von Degenfeld.

On 4 June 1683 she married Meinhardt Schomberg, 3rd Duke of Schomberg, and moved to London.

Like her siblings, she kept in touch with her aunt Electress Sophie of Hanover, whose son George I became King of Great Britain and Ireland, and her half-sister Elisabeth Charlotte (Liselotte), Duchess of Orléans, who married Philippe I, Duke of Orléans, a brother of King Louis XIV of France.

She and her husband had four children : Charles Schomberg, Marquess of Harwich; Frederica Mildmay, Countess of Mértola; Lady Caroline Schomberg; and Lady Mary Schomberg. However, Liselotte in one of her letters to Caroline's sister, Raugravine Louise, mentions that the couple had at least eight children. On 3 July 1694, she wrote: "I shudder to think that Caroline [...] already has eight children; [...]."

She is buried with her husband in Westminster Abbey.
