= Battle of Wittstock =

1636 battle of the Thirty Years' War

- Part of the Thirty Years' War
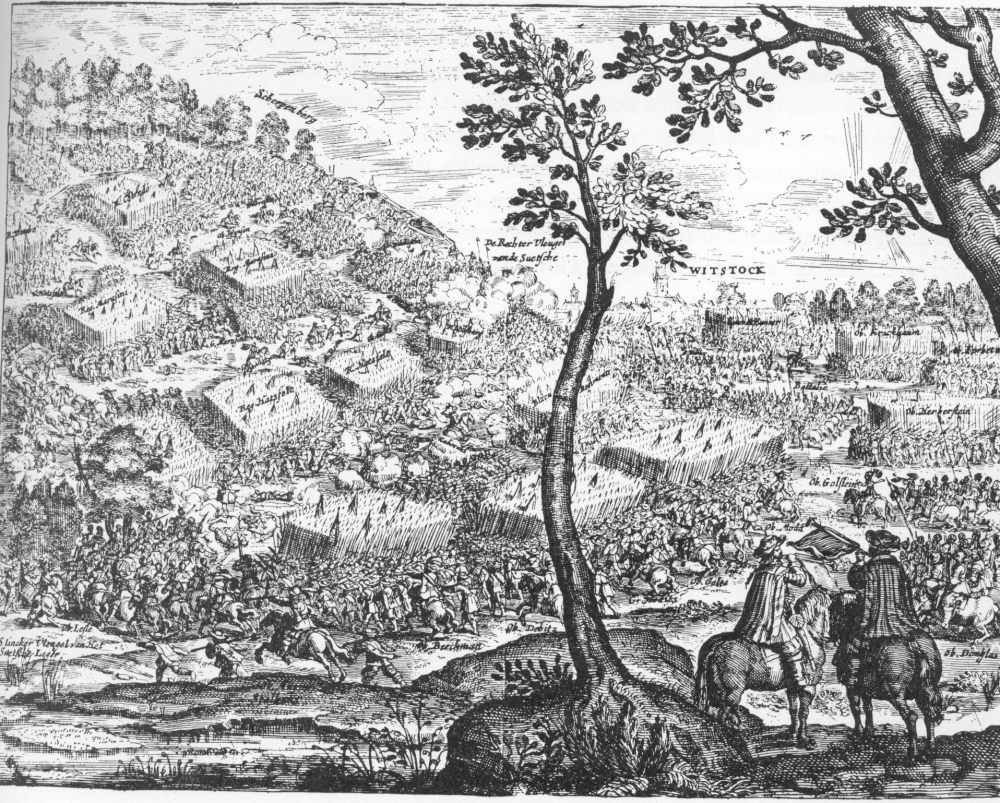
- Battle of Wittstock
Date	4 October 1636
Location	Wittstock, Brandenburg
Result	Swedish victory

Belligerents
Swedish Empire	Holy Roman Empire; Saxony

Commanders and leaders
(Swedish Empire) Johan Banér; (Swedish Empire) Lennart Torstensson; (Swedish Empire) Alexander Leslie; (Swedish Empire) James King; (Swedish Empire) Torsten Stålhandske	(Holy Roman Empire) Graf von Hatzfeldt; (Electorate of Saxony) John George I

Strength
17,000, 60 guns	18,000, 32 guns

Casualties and losses
3,500 dead or wounded	5,000 dead, wounded or captured

The Battle of Wittstock was fought on 4 October 1636, near Wittstock in northern Germany, during the Thirty Years' War. A Swedish army commanded jointly by Johan Banér and Alexander Leslie won a decisive victory against a combined Imperial–Saxon army, led by Count Melchior von Hatzfeld and John George I, Elector of Saxony.

== Background ==
After the Swedish defeat at Nördlingen in 1634, many protestant princes of the Holy Roman Empire lost faith in their alliance with Sweden and reconciled with the emperor. In May 1635, the Elector of Saxony agreed to the Peace of Prague with Emperor Ferdinand II. The Swedish ally France was forced to directly intervene in the war to oppose a potential Habsburg hegemony. In northern Germany, a corps of the Habsburg Imperial army and the Saxon army fought against the last significant Swedish forces.

The Imperial main army was screening the Swedish army behind the Dosse while a smaller army under General Klitzing was overrunning Brandenburg. Field Marshal Johan Banér commanding the main Swedish army was joined by Field Marshal Alexander Leslie commanding the Army of the Weser which comprised German, Scottish and (at least one) English regiments. Together they crossed the Dosse with a surprise march and met their opponents in the forested hilly landscape slightly south of Wittstock.

The Imperial army was larger in strength than the Swedish army, but at least one-third of it was composed of Saxon units of questionable quality. The Swedish artillery was considerably stronger, leading the Imperial commanders to maintain a largely defensive position on the hill tops.

== Battle ==
The Imperial forces decided to wait for the Swedes on a range of sandy hills, the Scharfenberg. A part of the Imperial front was further defended with six ditches and a wall of linked wagons. Their commanders waited for some time for the Swedish troops to appear on the open fields to their front. Instead, the Swedish army was turning the Imperial left flank, moving behind the cover of a series of linked hills. The Imperial troops were forced to redeploy their lines to set up a new front.

The battle was begun by small forces detached in detail to secure the hills. The Swedes, under Banér had problems moving up reinforcements through marshy ground, but battle was eventually joined along a wide front.

Initial Swedish attack

Banér and Leslie had detached one-fourth of the army under Lieutenant-General James King and Major-General Torsten Stålhandske to take a long detour around the Imperial right flank. They found the traverse difficult and slow, leading Banér's troops to take heavy casualties and begin to retreat. Alexander Leslie moved five of his regiments to his relief taking heavy casualties in the process with the Scottish and English regiments being particularly badly mauled. Nonetheless, they were able to relieve Banér in time for King's cavalry to finally outflank the Imperial troops causing a rout.

Swedish breakthrough

With Major General Vitzthum in the reserve refusing to engage the Imperials, his role was taken by Major-General John Ruthven (Leslie's son-in-law) who had been so deployed for just such an emergency. Now attacked on two fronts and with the reserve brigades engaged, the Imperial forces, having lost all their artillery, retreated under the cover of dusk in full rout.

== Aftermath ==
In the accounts of the battle preserved in National Archives of Sweden, Johan Banér accredits the victory to Field Marshal Leslie. Leslie, in his personal correspondence to the Swedish Chancellor, Axel Oxenstierna, was clearly horrified at the losses sustained by his army and implies that there had been disagreement about the wisdom of Banér's tactics before the battle. A third report, by James King conforms with Leslie's, but also contains additional information. All three have been transcribed, translated and published in English. Wittstock saved the Swedes from losing their last significant field army and not only restored Swedish prestige but also encouraged German protestant princes like Hesse-Kassel and the Guelphs to continue resisting the Emperor.

The overall political position of Emperor Ferdinand was paradoxically strengthened by the defeat. George William, Elector of Brandenburg, who had fled to East Prussia because of the Swedish occupation of his ancestral homelands, agreed to negotiate an alliance with the Emperor in November. In his weak position, George William did not expect to receive anything from the Swedes. He was in fear of losing his inheritance claim to Pomerania, a territory the Emperor and the Saxon Elector could offer the Swedes to obtain peace. Georg William supported the uncontested election of the Emperor's son Ferdinand, Archduke of Austria as King of the Romans on 22 December 1636. Two months later, Ferdinand succeeded his late father as Ferdinand III. On 22 June 1637, George William promised to reinforce the new Emperor with his army, over which General Klitzing took command. Despite financial support by the Emperor, Brandenburg never managed to raise more than 11,000 men.

== Sources ==
- Guthrie, William P. (2003), "The 1636 Campaign", The Later Thirty Years War: From the Battle of Wittstock to the Peace of Westphalia, Contributions in Military Studies, vol. 222 (illustrated ed.), Greenwood Publishing Group, pp. 43–61, ISBN 978-0313324086
- Gruppe, Gisela (2012). Kaiser, Elke (ed.). Missing in action during the Thirty Years’ War: Provenance of soldiers from the Wittstock battlefield, October 4, 1636. An investigation of stable strontium and oxygen isotopes in Population Dynamics in Prehistory and Early History: New Approaches Using Stable Isotopes and Genetics. De Gruyter. ISBN 978-3110266306.
- Murdoch, Steve; Zickermann, Kathrin; Marks, Adam (2012). "The Battle of Wittstock 1636: Conflicting Reports on a Swedish Victory in Germany". Northern Studies. 43: 71–109. Archived from the original on 8 July 2022.
- Trueman, Chris (16 February 2011), Thirty years War
- Wilson, Peter (2009). Europe's Tragedy: A History of the Thirty Years War. Allen Lane. ISBN 978-0713995923.
