= Charles II, Elector Palatine =

Elector Palatine from 1680 to 1685

Charles II
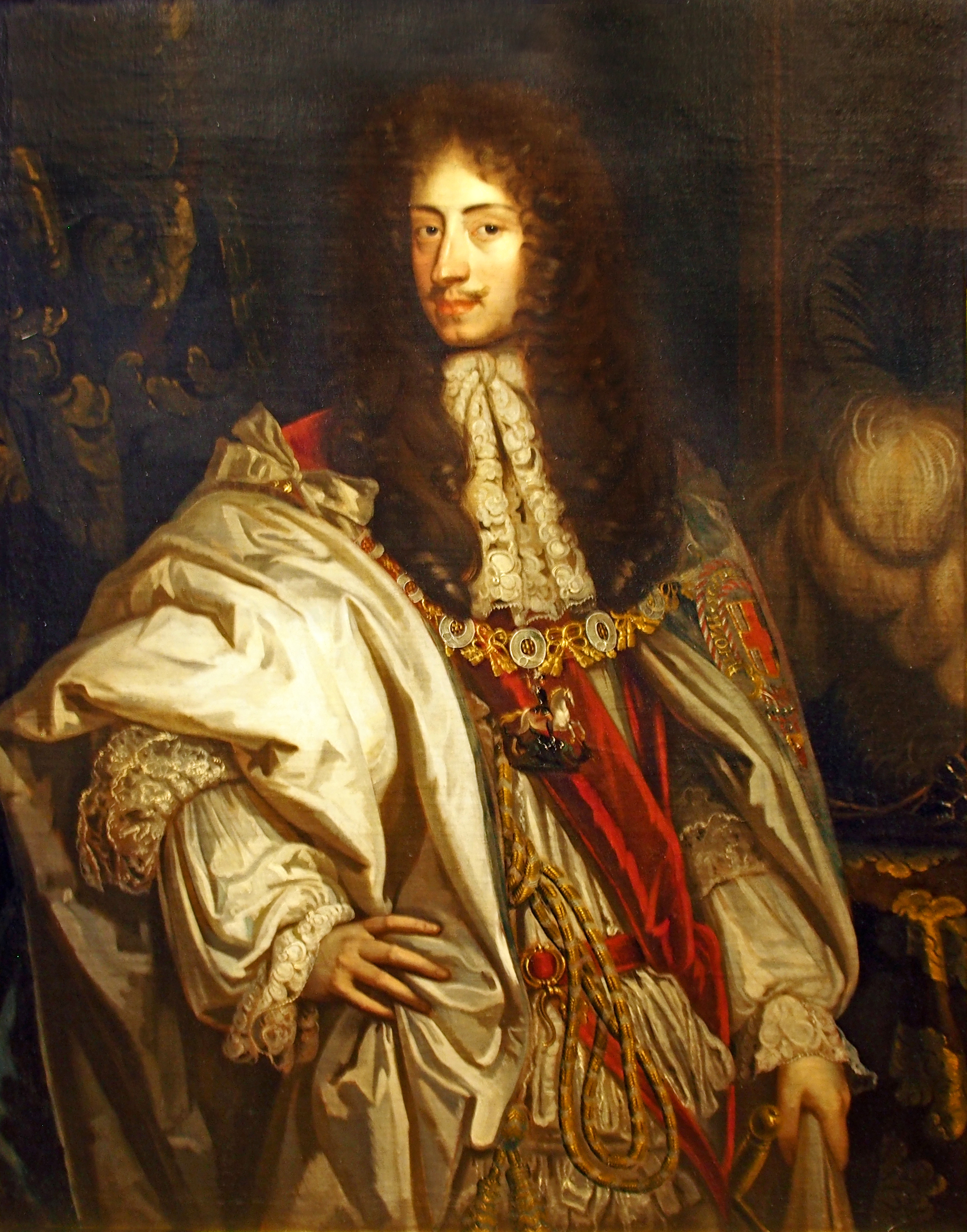
- Portrait by Willem Wissing, c. 1680

Elector Palatine
- Reign: 28 August 1680 – 26 May 1685
- Predecessor: Charles I Louis
- Successor: Philip William
- Born: 10 April 1651 (O.S.: 31 March 1651); Heidelberg
- Died: 26 May 1685 (aged 34); Heidelberg
- Burial: Church of the Holy Spirit, Heidelberg
- Spouse: Princess Wilhelmina Ernestine of Denmark
- House: Palatine Simmern
- Father: Charles I Louis
- Mother: Charlotte of Hesse-Kassel
- Religion: Protestant

Charles II (German: Karl II.; 10 April 1651, in Heidelberg – 26 May 1685, in Heidelberg) was Elector Palatine from 1680 to 1685. He was the son of Charles I Louis, Elector Palatine of the House of Wittelsbach, and Charlotte of Hesse-Kassel.

== Early life ==
His parents separated after a marriage that had been turbulent for years and the mother retreated to Kassel. As a result, Charles grew up without a mother under the eyes of his authoritarian father. Charles's younger sister Elizabeth Charlotte ("Liselotte") was married in 1671 to the brother of King Louis XIV of France, Philippe I, Duke of Orléans.

The prince's education was led by the scholars Samuel von Pufendorf and Ezekiel Spanheim. Charles undertook his cavalier tour to Switzerland and France in 1670. In Switzerland, Karl fell ill with smallpox, which permanently disfigured his face.

In 1671, he married through his aunt Sophia of Hanover's mediation Princess Wilhelmine Ernestine of Denmark, a daughter of King Frederick III of Denmark and Sophie Amalie of Brunswick-Lüneburg, in Heidelberg. The marriage became unhappy and remained childless. Sophia later wrote about it in her memoirs: “The Electoral Prince, who had a very reserved upbringing, asked the Duke (Sophia's husband Ernest Augustus) to give him his advice in matters that he knew nothing about. But he seems to have been a bad student, because his wife never became pregnant.“

== Rule ==
His short reign was not glamorous. He appointed his incompetent former tutor Paul Hachenberg as chief minister, leaving his half-siblings, the "Raugraves", out of favour. He brought back his mother from Kassel and paid her immense debts. Charles was of a weak and timid nature, marked by familial childhood experiences. He showed a superficial enthusiasm for military life. Charles was a strict Calvinist. The court preacher Johann Ludwig Langhanns became senior minister after Hachenberg's death.

Increasing financial difficulties in the state budget, caused by oversized households, passion for hunting and theater as well as military spending, could no longer be regulated by tax increases. In 1682, Charles pledged Germersheim to France for twenty years. He liked to stage expensive theatrical re-enactments of battles with sieges, ships, etc. and within a few years wasted the national treasury that his father had saved over many years.

Charles was the last Elector of the Palatinate from the Protestant Reformed House of Palatinate-Simmern; upon his death, the Electoral Palatinate passed to the Catholic Palatinate-Neuburg branch of the family. The rival claims to the Palatinate of his sister, Elizabeth Charlotte, Duchess of Orleans, Louis XIV's sister-in-law, was the pretext for the French invasion of the Palatinate in 1688, which began the Nine Years War.

== Ancestry ==
Ancestors of Charles II, Elector Palatine

8. Frederick IV, Elector Palatine
4. Frederick V of the Palatinate
9. Louise Juliana of Nassau
2. Charles I Louis, Elector Palatine
10. James I, King of England
5. Elizabeth of England
11. Anne of Denmark
1. Charles II, Elector Palatine
12. Maurice, Landgrave of Hesse-Kassel
6. William V, Landgrave of Hesse-Kassel
13. Agnes of Solms-Laubach
3. Charlotte of Hesse-Kassel
14. Philip Louis II, Count of Hanau-Münzenberg
7. Amalie Elisabeth of Hanau-Münzenberg
15. Catharina Belgica of Nassau

Charles II, Elector Palatine House of Wittelsbach Born: 1651 Died: 1685
Regnal titles
Preceded by Charles I Louis	Elector Palatine; 1680–1685	Succeeded by Philip William
