= Robert Darcy, 3rd Earl of Holderness =

British politician

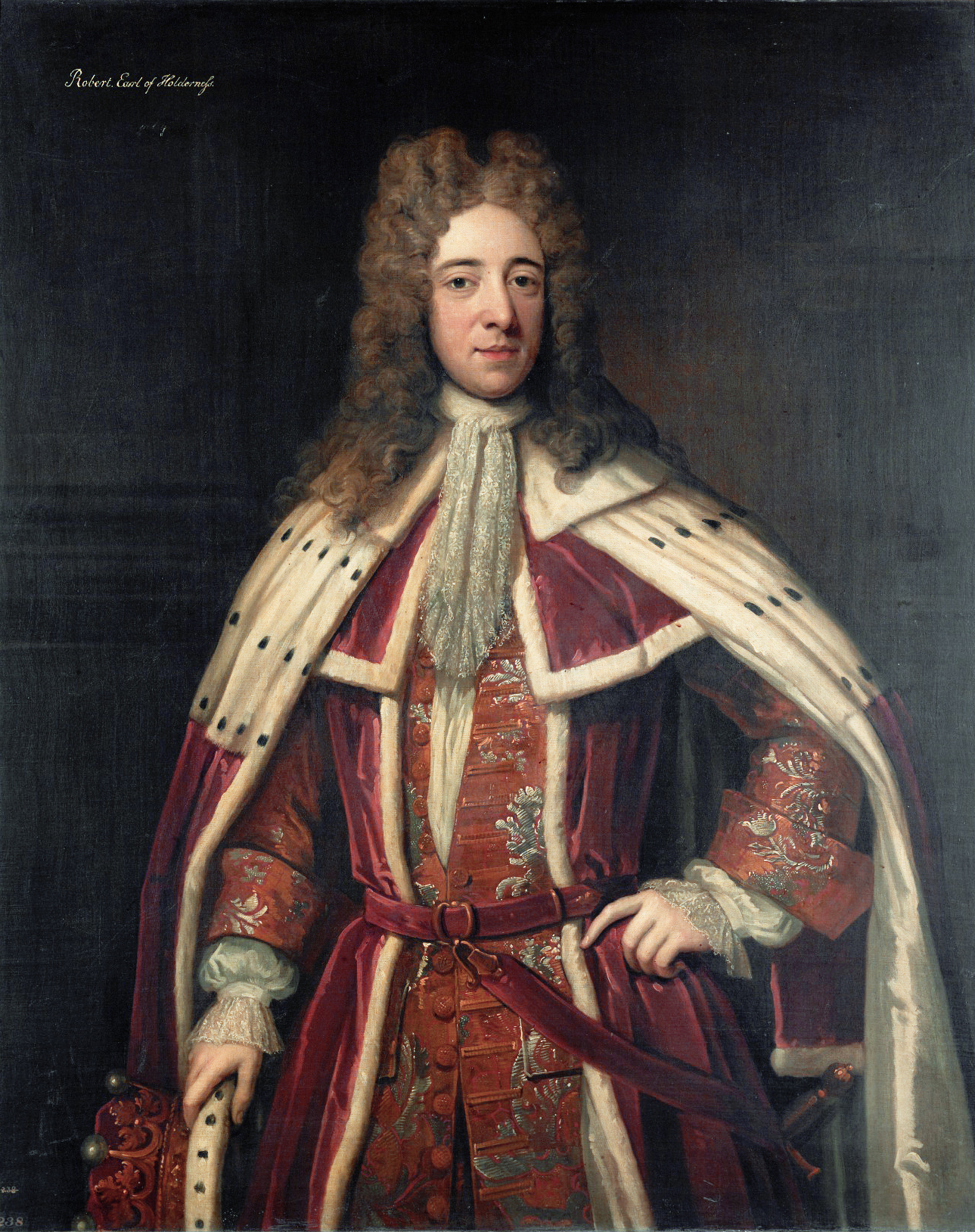
Robert Darcy, 3rd Earl of Holderness (1681–1721) (Charles d'Agar)

Robert Darcy, 3rd Earl of Holderness, PC (24 November 1681 – 20 January 1721) was a British Whig politician who served as First Lord of Trade from 1718 to 1719.

== Life ==
Darcy was the second (but eldest surviving) son of John Darcy, Lord Conyers, (himself the eldest son of Conyers Darcy, 2nd Earl of Holderness), and Bridget, daughter of Robert Sutton, 1st Baron Lexington. He was styled Lord Conyers when his father died in 1688 and later inherited his grandfather's earldom in 1692. He also inherited the titles of 10th Baron Darcy de Knayth and 7th Baron Conyers. In 1698 he matriculated fellow-commoner from King's College, Cambridge. In 1714, the Earl of Holderness, as he now was, was appointed Lord Lieutenant of the North Riding of Yorkshire, admitted to the Privy Council. In 1718, he was appointed First Lord of Trade. He was also a Lord of the Bedchamber from 1719 to his death.

On 26 May 1715, Holderness married Lady Frederica Schomberg (the eldest surviving daughter of the 3rd Duke of Schomberg) and they had two surviving children: Hon. Robert (1718–1778) and Lady Caroline (d. 1778, married the 4th Marquess of Lothian).

On Lord Holderness' death in 1721, his title passed to his only surviving son, Robert Darcy, and his wife later married the future 1st Earl FitzWalter.

Political offices
Preceded by The Earl of Suffolk	First Lord of Trade; 1718–1719	Succeeded by The Earl of Westmorland
Honorary titles
Preceded by The Duke of Buckingham and Normanby	Lord Lieutenant of the North Riding of Yorkshire; 1714–1721	Succeeded by Conyers Darcy
Peerage of England
Preceded by Conyers Darcy	Earl of Holderness; 1692–1721	Succeeded by Robert Darcy
