= Meinhardt Schomberg, 3rd Duke of Schomberg =

German-born military officer and peer

General His Grace The Duke of Schomberg KG
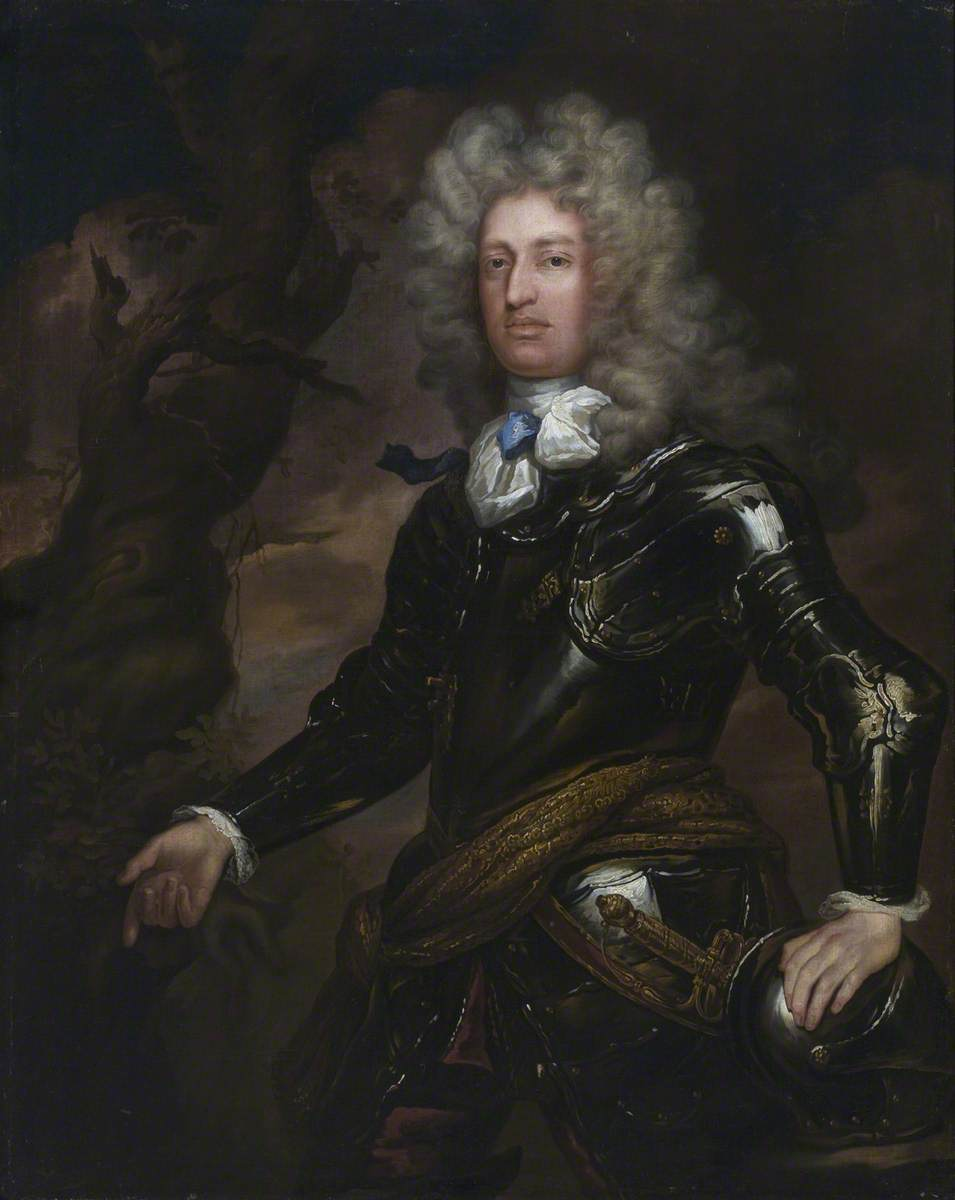

Commander-in-Chief of the Forces
- In office 1691–1691
- Monarch: William III
- Preceded by: The Earl of Marlborough
- Succeeded by: The Duke of Marlborough

Personal details
- Born: 30 June 1641 Cologne, Holy Roman Empire
- Died: 16 July 1719 (aged 78) Hillingdon, Middlesex
- Spouse(s): Barbara Luisa Rizzi (m. 1667); Raugravine Caroline Elisabeth (m. 1682)
- Children: 4, including Charles and Frederica
- Parent(s): Frederick Schomberg, 1st Duke of Schomberg; Johanna Elizabeth de Schomberg
- Profession: Military officer
- Awards: Knight of the Garter

Military service
- Allegiance: England (1689–1707); Great Britain (1707–1719)
- Branch/service: English Army (1689–1707); British Army (1707–1719)
- Rank: General
- Battles/wars: Portuguese Restoration War; Franco-Dutch War; Williamite War in Ireland; War of the Spanish Succession

General Meinhardt Schomberg, 3rd Duke of Schomberg, 1st Duke of Leinster, KG (30 June 1641 – 16 July [O.S. 5 July] 1719), was a German-born military officer and peer who served as Commander-in-Chief of the Forces in 1691. He spent the majority of his military career in service to William III of England, fighting in the Portuguese Restoration War, Franco-Dutch War, Williamite War in Ireland and the War of the Spanish Succession.

== Life ==
Born the son of Frederick Schomberg, 1st Duke of Schomberg (who was of Huguenot descent), and Johanna Elizabeth de Schomberg (née von Schönberg), Meinhardt Schomberg joined his father in the service of the English Expeditionary brigade to Portugal and served as a lieutenant-colonel and then as a colonel. He then settled in La Rochelle with his father and became a French subject. He attained the rank of brigadier and, afterwards, maréchal de camp (major general), during the Franco-Dutch War in 1678. He fought under Marshal François de Créquy at the Battle of Kochersburg in October 1677, the Battle of Freiburg im Breisgau on 14 November 1677, at the Battle of Rheinfelden in July 1678 and at the Battle of Kinzing later that month, before serving under Frederick William, Elector of Brandenburg as a general of cavalry.

He travelled to England in Spring 1689 and was made colonel of Lord Cavendish's Regiment of Horse on 10 April 1690 and commissioned a general of the horse on 19 April 1690.

He served under his father during the Williamite War in Ireland, fighting against the Jacobite Irish Army. Frederick Schomberg was second in command of William's army at the Battle of the Boyne in July 1690. Meanwhile, Meinhardt Schomberg commanded the right wing of William's army during the battle and led the crucial crossing of the River Boyne at Roughgrange near Rosnaree on the Jacobites' flank, the turning point in the confrontation, despite a gallant defence by Sir Neil O'Neill, a Jacobite general. Schomberg then engaged in a pursuit of the retreating troops towards Duleek: there were no casualties amongst his regiment's soldiers. Schomberg's father died during the latter stages of the Battle which resulted in a decisive Williamite victory.

Naturalization of Meinhardt, Duke of Leinster Act 1691
- Act of Parliament
- Parliament of England
- Long title: An Act for naturalizing of Mainhardt Duke of Leinster, and others.
- Citation: 3 Will. & Mar. c. 24 Pr.
- Territorial extent: England and Wales

Dates
- Royal assent: 24 February 1692
- Commencement: 22 October 1691 (Note: Start of session.)

Status: Current legislation

Meinhardt Schomberg was created Duke of Leinster for his part in the Battle on 30 June 1690 and, after taking part in the abortive Siege of Limerick in August 1690, he became a British subject through naturalization by Act of Parliament on 25 April 1691. From May 1691 he was also made Commander-in-Chief of the Forces during the King's travels in Flanders. In Spring 1693 Schomberg was placed in command of the abortive descent on Saint-Malo and in October 1693 he inherited the title of Duke of Schomberg following the death of his younger brother Charles Schomberg at the Battle of Marsaglia. In 1698 he moved into Schomberg House, a new mansion specially commissioned for him on the south side of Pall Mall, London.

In 1703, he was created Knight of the Garter and Queen Anne appointed him Commander-in-Chief of the British forces sent to Portugal for the War of the Spanish Succession. Once in Portugal Schomberg was ineffective, simply allowing the Spanish General Tserclaes de Tilly to pass by unchallenged. Moreover, Schomberg had a dreadful temper which attracted universal disgust: neither Peter II, King of Portugal, nor Charles, claimant to the throne of Spain, were prepared to accept his turbulent behaviour and he was sent home in disgrace.

Meinhardt Schomberg had an interest in naval matters and registered a patent concerning inspecting the fishing for wrecks. He commissioned the construction of Hillingdon House in 1717 as his hunting lodge and died there on 16 July [O.S. 5 July] 1719. He had no surviving male issue so all of his titles (Duke of Schomberg, Duke of Leinster, Marquess of Harwich, Earl of Brentford, Earl of Bangor, Baron Teyes and Count of Mértola) except Count of Mértola died with him.

The town of Schomberg, Ontario was renamed to commemorate the 3rd Duke of Schomberg in 1862.

== Family ==
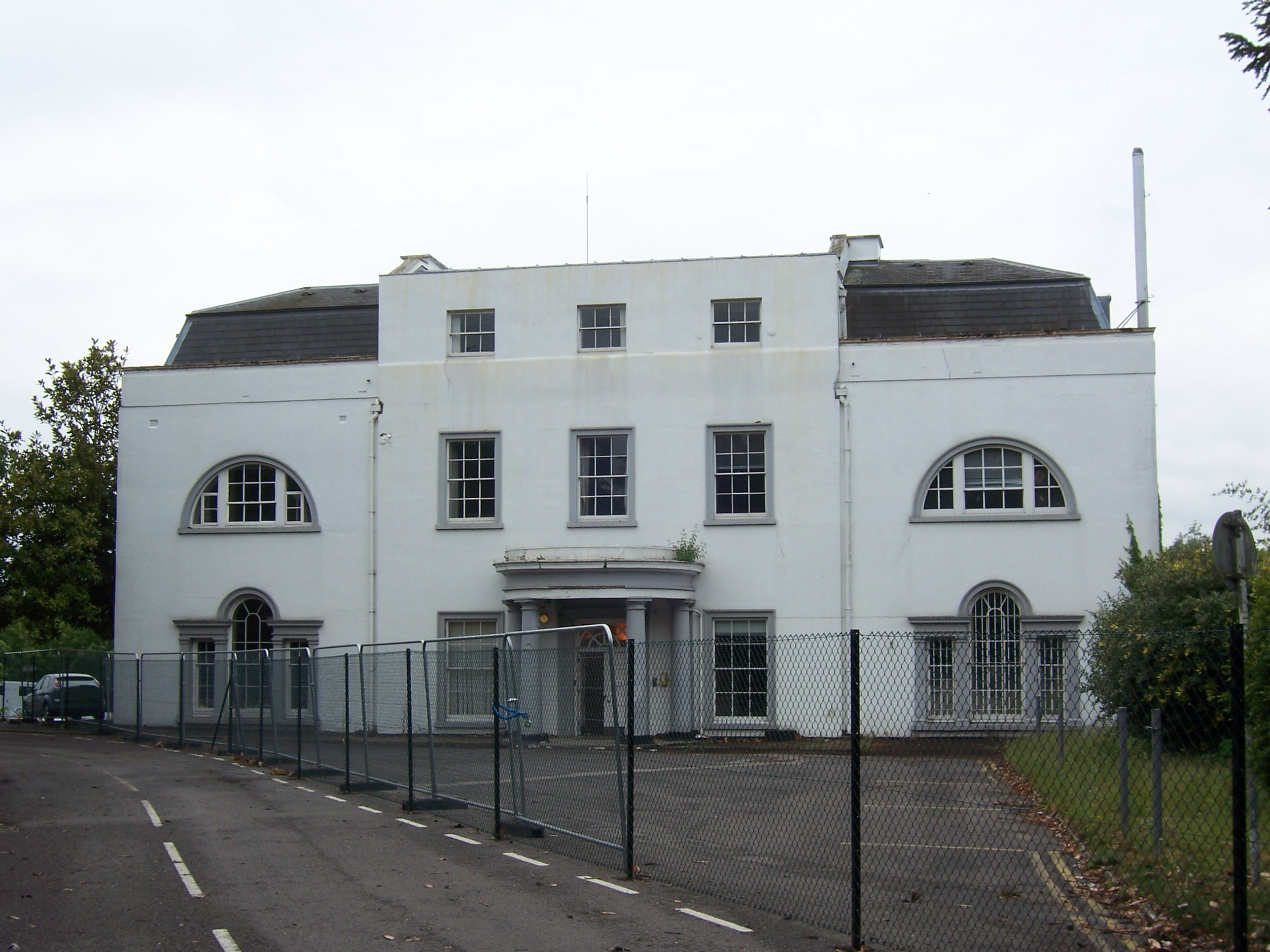
Schomberg had Hillingdon House built in 1717

On 3 August 1667 Schomberg married Piedmontese Barbara Luisa Rizzi in La Rochelle. The couple did not have any children, although some sources suggest that shortly after the marriage he abandoned his wife when she was seven months pregnant after she refused to divorce.

On 4 January 1682 Schomberg married for the second time, to Raugravine Caroline Elisabeth (a daughter of Charles I Louis, Elector Palatine) and together they had four children:

- Charles Louis Schomberg, Marquess of Harwich (15 December 1683 – 14 October 1713), died from tuberculosis.
- Lady Caroline Schomberg (1686 – 18 June 1710)
- Lady Frederica Schomberg (c. 1688–1751) married (1) Robert Darcy, 3rd Earl of Holderness, and (2) Benjamin Mildmay, 1st Earl FitzWalter
- Lady Mary Schomberg (bap. 16 March 1692 – 29 April 1762) married Christoph Martin von Degenfeld-Schonburg

== Sources ==
- Cruickshank, Eveline (2002). The House of Commons, 1690–1715, Volume 1. Cambridge. ISBN 0-521-77221-4.
- Noble, Mark (1806). A biographical history of England, from the Revolution to the end of George I's reign. W. Richardson. p. 179. "Meinhardt schomberg."
- Shaw, William (1934). Index of persons and Places: S', Calendar of Treasury Books, Volume 14: 1698–1699.
- Sherwood, Philip (2007). Around Uxbridge Past & Present. Stroud: Sutton Publishing. ISBN 978-0-7509-4794-7.

Military offices
Preceded by The Earl of Marlborough	Commander-in-Chief of the Forces; 1691	Vacant Title next held by The Duke of Marlborough
Peerage of Ireland
New creation	Duke of Leinster; 1691–1719	Extinct
Peerage of England
Preceded by Charles Schomberg	Duke of Schomberg; 1693–1719	Extinct
Portuguese nobility
Preceded by Frederick Schomberg	Count of Mértola; 1690–1719	Succeeded by Frederica Darcy
