= Charles I Louis =

Elector Palatine from 1648 to 1680

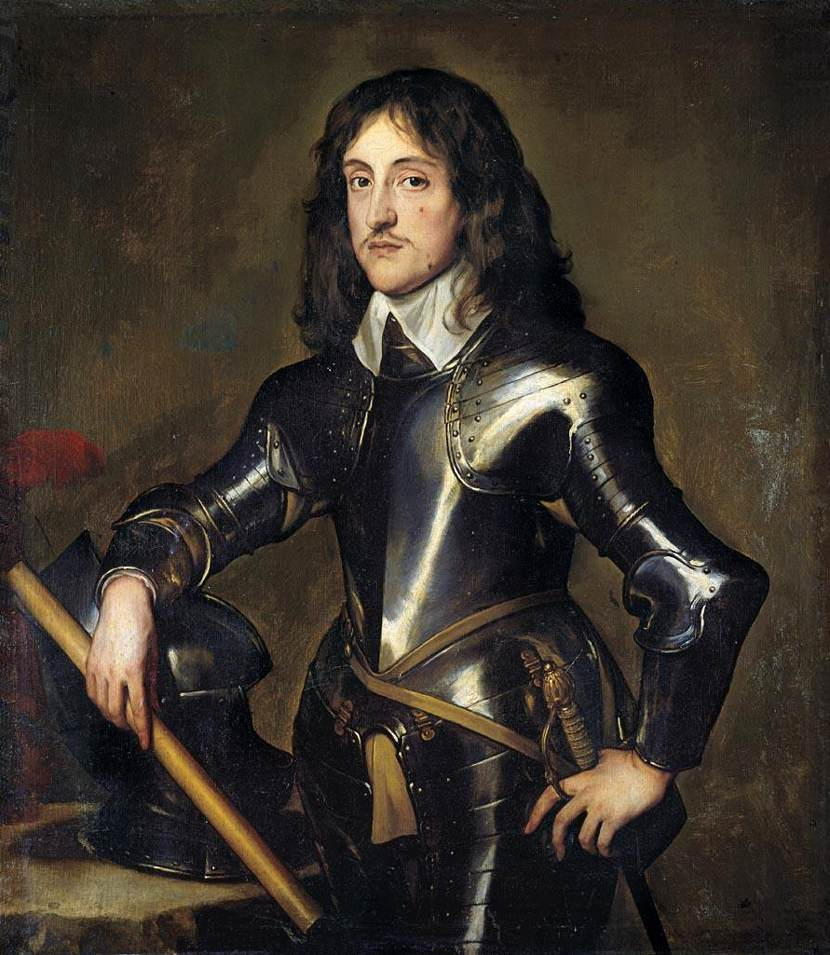
- Portrait by Sir Anthony van Dyck, c. 1641

Elector Palatine
- Reign: 24 October 1648 – 28 August 1680
- Predecessor: Maximilian I
- Successor: Charles II
- Born: 22 December 1617; Heidelberg, Holy Roman Empire
- Died: 28 August 1680 (aged 62) near Edingen, Holy Roman Empire
- Spouse: Charlotte of Hesse-Kassel (m. 1650; div. 1657) Marie Luise von Degenfeld (m. 1658; died 1677) Elisabeth Hollander von Bernau (m. 1679)
- Issue more...: Charles II, Elector Palatine; Elizabeth Charlotte, Madame Palatine; Raugravine Caroline Elisabeth; Ludwig von Seltz (illegitimate)
- House: Palatine Simmern
- Father: Frederick V of the Palatinate
- Mother: Elizabeth Stuart
- Religion: Calvinism

Charles I Louis (German: Karl I. Ludwig; 22 December 1617 – 28 August 1680) was Elector Palatine from 1648 until his death. He was the second son of Frederick V of the Palatinate, the "Winter King" of Bohemia, and the British princess Elizabeth Stuart.

After living the first half of his life in exile during the German Thirty Years' War and the English Civil War, in 1649 Charles Louis reclaimed his father's title of Elector Palatine, along with most of his former territories.

== Stuart and British politics ==
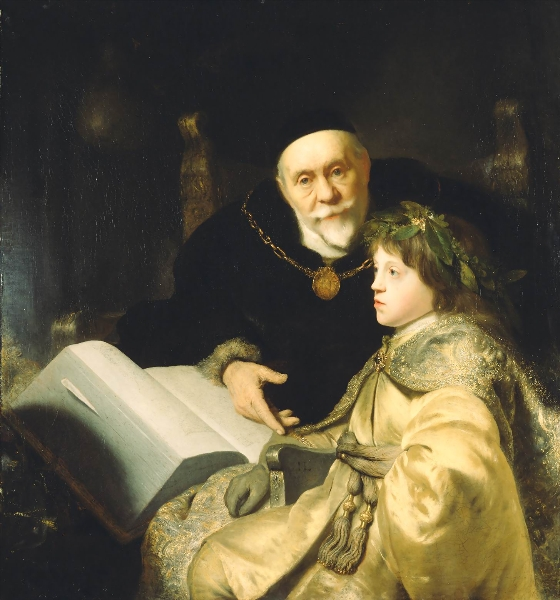
Charles Louis with his teacher Volrad von Plesse, painting by Jan Lievens, 1631.

Charles Louis was baptised in March 1618 in the presence of the Prince of Sedan and Albertus Morton, who was the representative of the Prince of Wales. On the death of his exiled father in 1632, Charles Louis inherited his father's possessions in the Electorate of the Palatinate. His older brother Henry Frederick had died in the Netherlands in 1629.

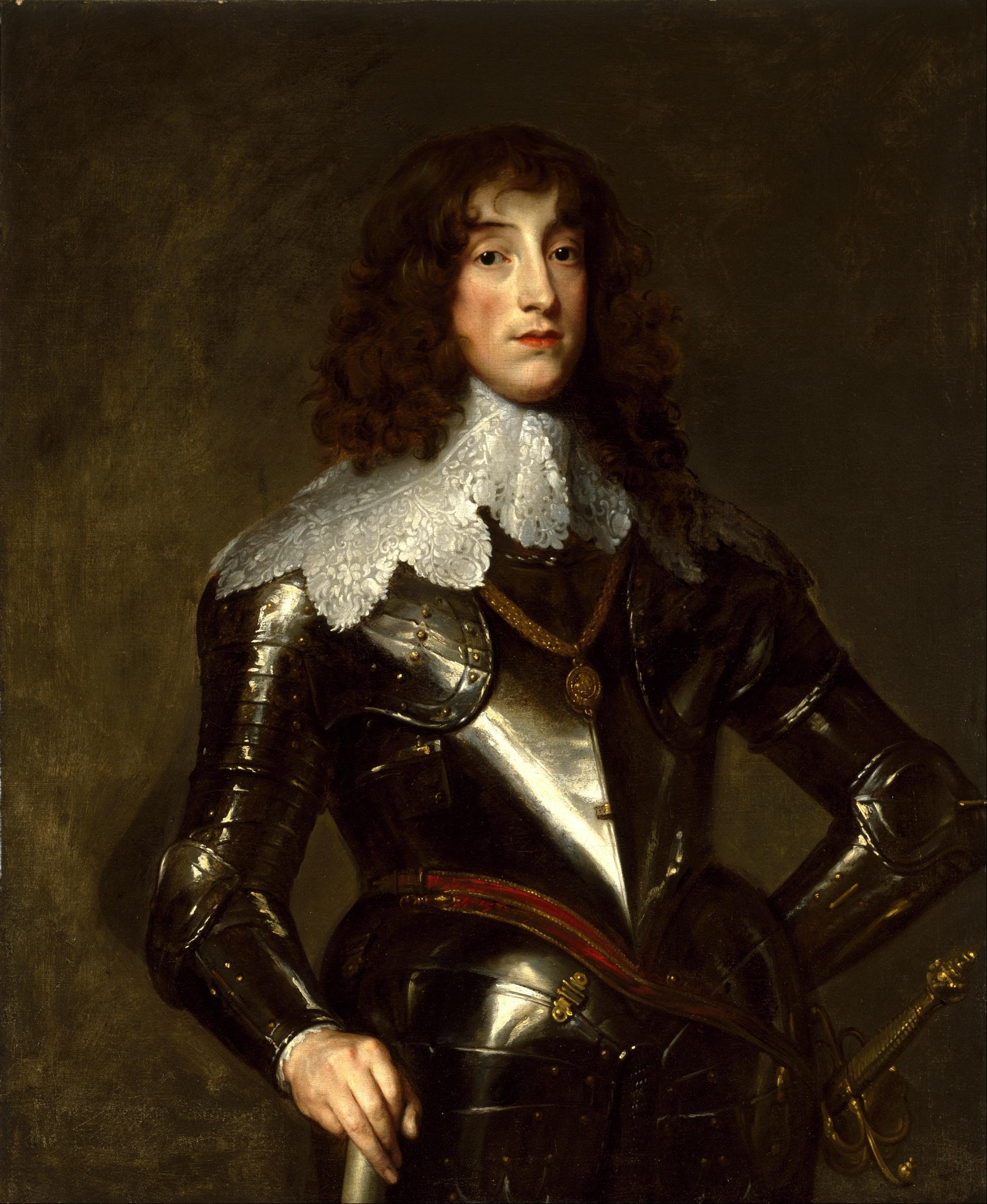
Charles Louis, Elector Palatine by Anthony van Dyck, 1637

Charles Louis and his younger brother Rupert spent much of the 1630s at the court of his maternal uncle, Charles I of England, hoping to enlist British support for his cause. Despite support from his mother's officials Curtius and Nethersole, the young Elector Palatine had limited success. He led an army of voluntaries from Britain (led by William Lord Craven) and the Palatinate (in alliance with Swedish forces under the command of the Scot Lieutenant General James King) at the Battle of Vlotho Bridge on 17 October 1638. Lord Craven, Prince Rupert and Colonel William Vavasour were captured after a rash charge by Prince Rupert (who tried to blame King). It is clear from the correspondence in the Swedish archives that King had managed to extract Charles Louis and his forces from the field and had them under his protection in Minden throughout October and November, a matter that caused much consternation to Field Marshal Banier who sowed rumours about King preferring the Elector's to Swedish service. This was something King forcefully rejected, although he did seek instruction as to how to deal with Charles Louis and his army. Thereafter after Charles Louis retired first to The Hague, and then to Britain. In November 1641, Charles Louis sat in the Scottish Parliament and secured the right to 10,000 Scottish Covenanter soldiers who were to follow him to Germany. Unfortunately the Irish Rebellion broke out and these forces were diverted to Ireland to protect the Protestant community there.

Charles Louis afterwards became gradually estranged from the King, who feared that Charles Louis might become a focus for opposition forces in England. Indeed, in the English crisis leading up to the outbreak of the English Civil War, Charles Louis had considerable sympathy for the parliamentary leaders, especially the Earl of Essex, feeling them more likely to come to the aid of the Palatinate on the continent. The Prince Palatine supported the execution of Strafford. Although Charles Louis was involved in the early stages of the Civil War with his uncle, he was mistrusted for his parliamentary sympathies, and soon returned to his mother in The Hague. There he distanced himself from the royalist (Cavalier) cause in the Civil War, fearing that Charles would sell him out for Spanish support.

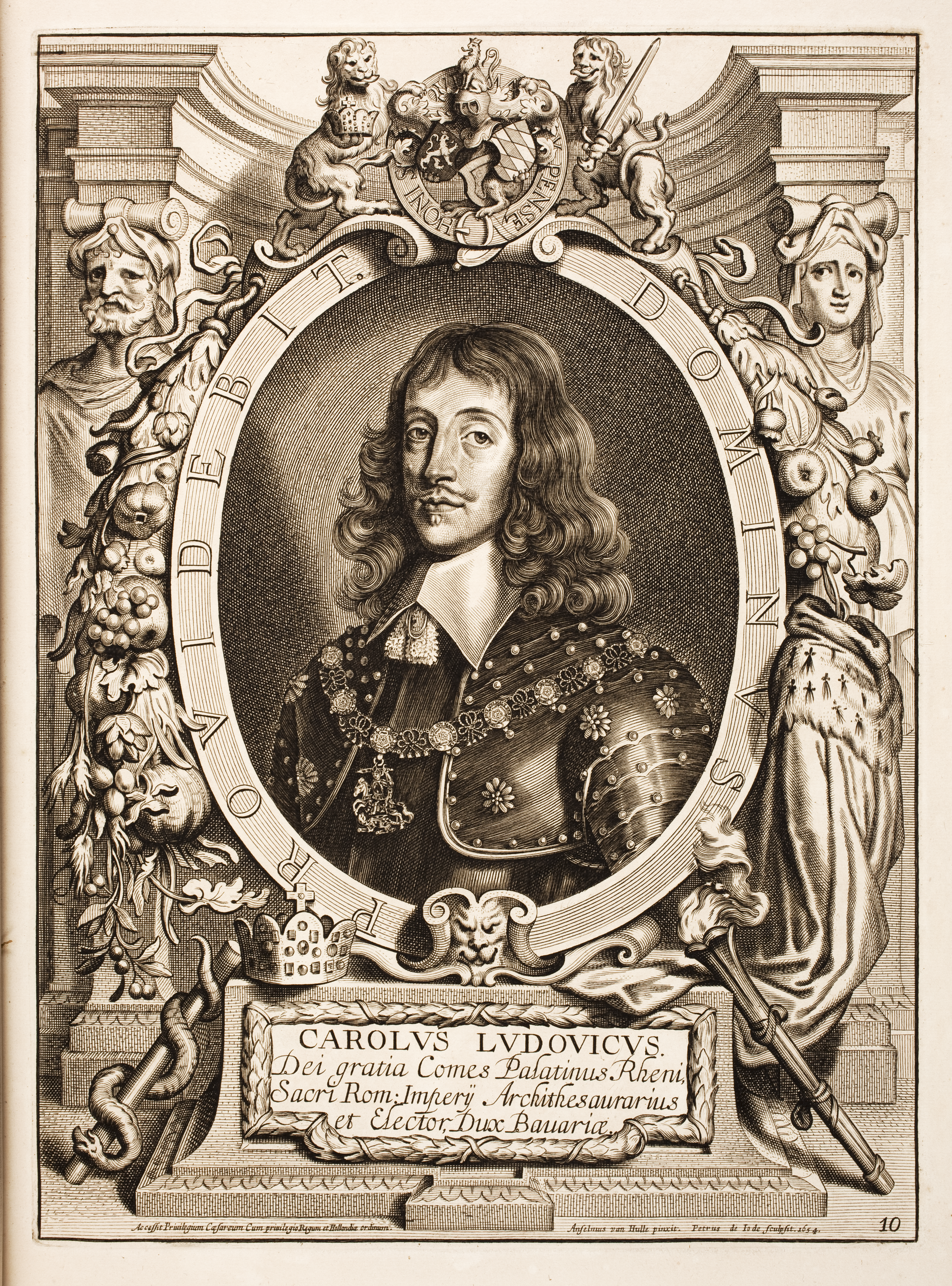
Engraving of Charles I Louis

In 1644, Charles Louis returned to England at the invitation of Parliament. He took up residence in the Palace of Whitehall and took the Solemn League and Covenant, even though his brothers, Rupert and Maurice, were Royalist generals. Contemporaries (including King Charles) and some in subsequent generations believed that Charles Louis's motive in visiting Roundhead London was that he hoped that Parliament would enthrone him in place of his uncle. Charles Louis's endorsement of the Parliamentary party was a cause of enmity between uncle and nephew, and when a captive Charles I met his nephew once again in 1647, the elder Charles accused the Prince of angling for the English throne. Charles Louis was still in England in October 1648 when the Peace of Westphalia restored the Lower Palatinate to him (the Upper Palatinate, to his great disappointment, remained under the Elector of Bavaria). He remained in England long enough to see the execution of his uncle in January 1649, which appears to have come as a shock. The two had not reconciled prior to the King's death – Charles refused to see his nephew before his execution.

== Electorate ==
After this unhappy dénouement to Charles Louis's participation in English politics, he at last returned to the now devastated Electorate of the Palatinate in the autumn of 1649. Over the more than thirty years of his reign there, he strove with some success to rebuild his shattered territory. In foreign affairs, he pursued a pro-French course, marrying his daughter Elizabeth Charlotte to Philippe I, Duke of Orléans, Louis XIV's brother, in 1671. After his restoration, his relations with his relatives continued to deteriorate. His British relations never forgave him for his course in the Civil War, while his mother and siblings resented his parsimony.

His sister, Sophia of Hanover, wrote in her memoirs that right after marrying his wife, Charlotte of Hesse-Kassel, "her eyebrows [...] made too much of a contrast with her hair".

The marriage went from bad to worse right in front of Sophia's eyes. After being pregnant three times in three years, Charlotte refused to allow him into her bed chambers anymore. After this, their relationship deteriorated. He once hit his wife so hard that her nose bled, despite her efforts to make him happy -- for example, once bringing him an expensive horse.

The most notable facet of his reign was probably his unilateral divorce of his wife, and subsequent marriage to Marie Luise von Degenfeld. This second wife was given the unique title of Raugravine (Raugräfin, countess of uninhabited or uncultivated lands), and their children were known as the Raugraves.

== Ancestry ==
Ancestors of Charles I Louis

8. Louis VI, Elector Palatine
4. Frederick IV, Elector Palatine
9. Elisabeth of Hesse
2. Frederick V of the Palatinate
10. William I, Prince of Orange
5. Louise Juliana von Orange-Nassau
11. Charlotte de Bourbon-Montpensier
1. Charles I Louis, Elector Palatine
12. Henry Stuart, Lord Darnley
6. James I of England
13. Mary, Queen of Scots
3. Elizabeth Stuart
14. Frederick II of Denmark
7. Anne of Denmark
15. Sofie of Mecklenburg-Schwerin

== Family ==
Lover	Unknown
Children	1. Ludwig von Seltz (1643 – 1660)
Wife 1	Charlotte of Hesse-Kassel, 20 November 1627 – 16 March 1686, Kassel
Married	22 February 1650 Kassel
Children	1. Charles II, Elector Palatine (31 March 1651 – 26 May 1685); 2. Elizabeth Charlotte, Princess of the Palatinate (27 May 1652, Heidelberg – 8 December 1722); 3. Friedrich (12 May 1653 – 13 May 1653)
Wife 2	Marie Luise von Degenfeld, 28 November 1634 – 18 March 1677, Strasbourg
Morganatically Married	6 January 1658 Schwetzingen
Children	1. Karl Ludwig von der Pfalz (15 October 1658 – 12 August 1688); 2. Karoline von der Pfalz (19 November 1659 – 28 June 1696), married Meinhardt Schomberg, 3rd Duke of Schomberg; 3. Louise von der Pfalz (25 January 1661 – 6 February 1733); 4. Ludwig von der Pfalz (19 February 1662 – 7 April 1662); 5. Amalie Elisabeth von der Pfalz (1 April 1663 – 13 July 1709); 6. George Ludwig von der Pfalz (30 March 1664 – 20 July 1665); 7. Frederike von der Pfalz (7 July 1665 – 7 August 1674); 8. Friedrich Wilhelm von der Pfalz (25 November 1666 – 29 July 1667); 9. Karl Eduard von der Pfalz (19 May 1668 – 2 January 1690); 10. Sophie von der Pfalz (19 July 1669 – 28 November 1669); 11. Karl Moritz von der Pfalz (9 January 1671 – 13 June 1702); 12. Karl August von der Pfalz (19 October 1672 – 20 September 1691); 13. Karl Kasimir von der Pfalz (1 May 1675 – 28 April 1691)
Wife 3	Elisabeth Hollander von Bernau, 1659 – 8 March 1702 Schaffhausen
Morganatically Married	11 December 1679 Schloss Friedrichsburg
Children	1. Charles Louis von der Pfalz (born 17 April 1681- 26 May 1685 Schaffhausen)

== Notes ==
Charles I Louis House of Palatinate-Simmern Cadet branch of the House of Wittelsbach Born: 22 September 1617 Died: 28 August 1680
Regnal titles
Preceded by Frederick V	Elector Palatine; 1648 (1632)–1680	Succeeded by Charles II
