= Johan Banér =

Swedish field marshal (1596–1641)

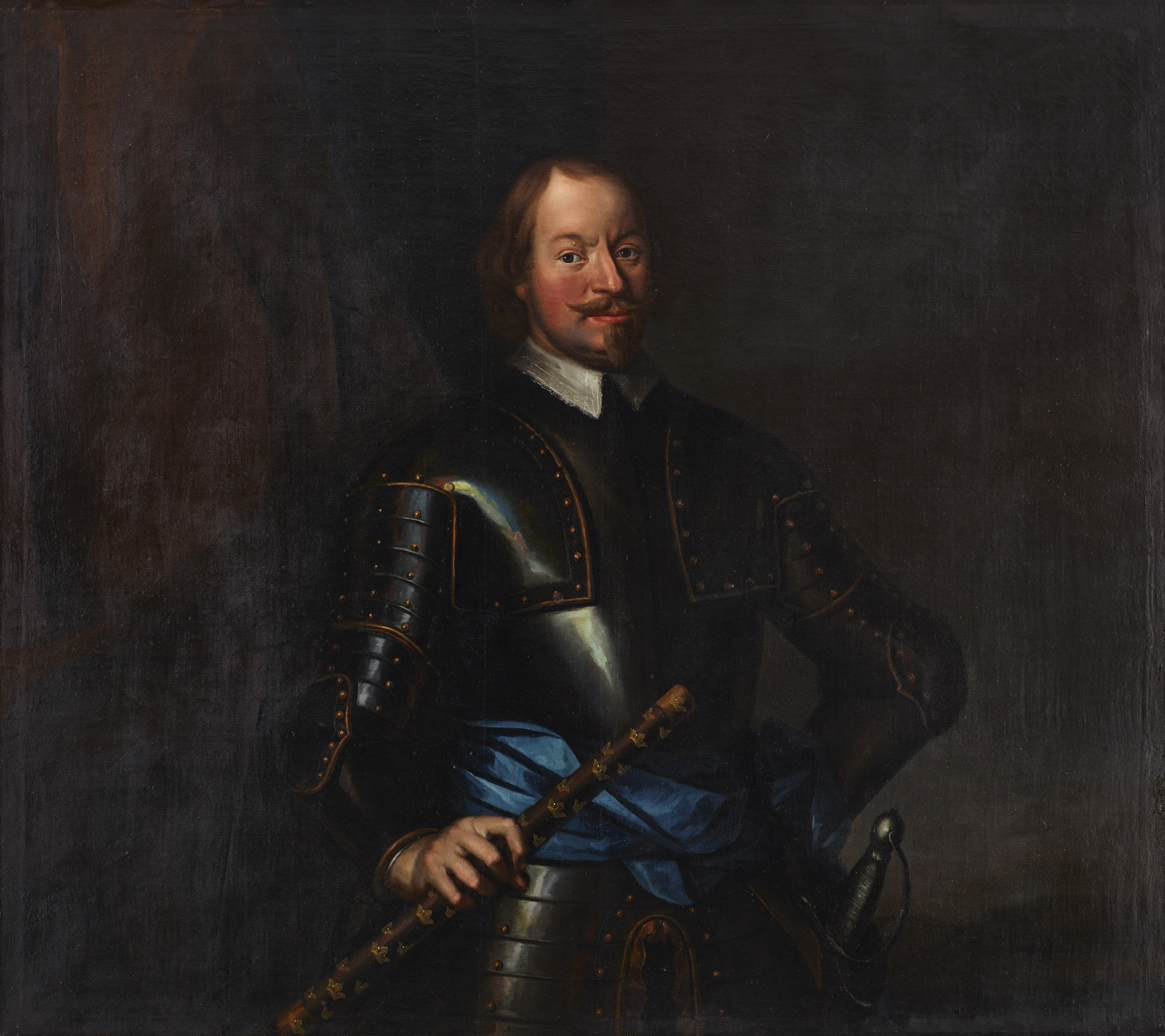
- Johan Banér
- Born: 23 June 1596; Djursholm Castle, Sweden
- Died: 10 May 1641 (aged 44); Halberstadt, Saxony
- Spouses: Catharina Elisabeth von Pfuel (m. 1623; died 1636) Elisabeth Juliana von Erbach (m. 1636; died 1640): Johanna von Baden-Durlach
- Military career
- Allegiance: Sweden
- Branch: Swedish Army
- Service years: 1615–1641
- Rank: Fältmarskalk
- Conflicts: Battles: Ingrian War; Polish–Swedish War (1621–1625); Polish–Swedish War (1626–1629); Thirty Years' War; Storming of Ribnitz; Battle of Breitenfeld; Battle of Rain; Siege of Nuremberg; Battle of Alte Veste; Battle of Wittstock; Siege of Leipzig; Battle of Chemnitz; Battle of Melnik; Battle of Preßnitz
- Other work: Privy Councillor

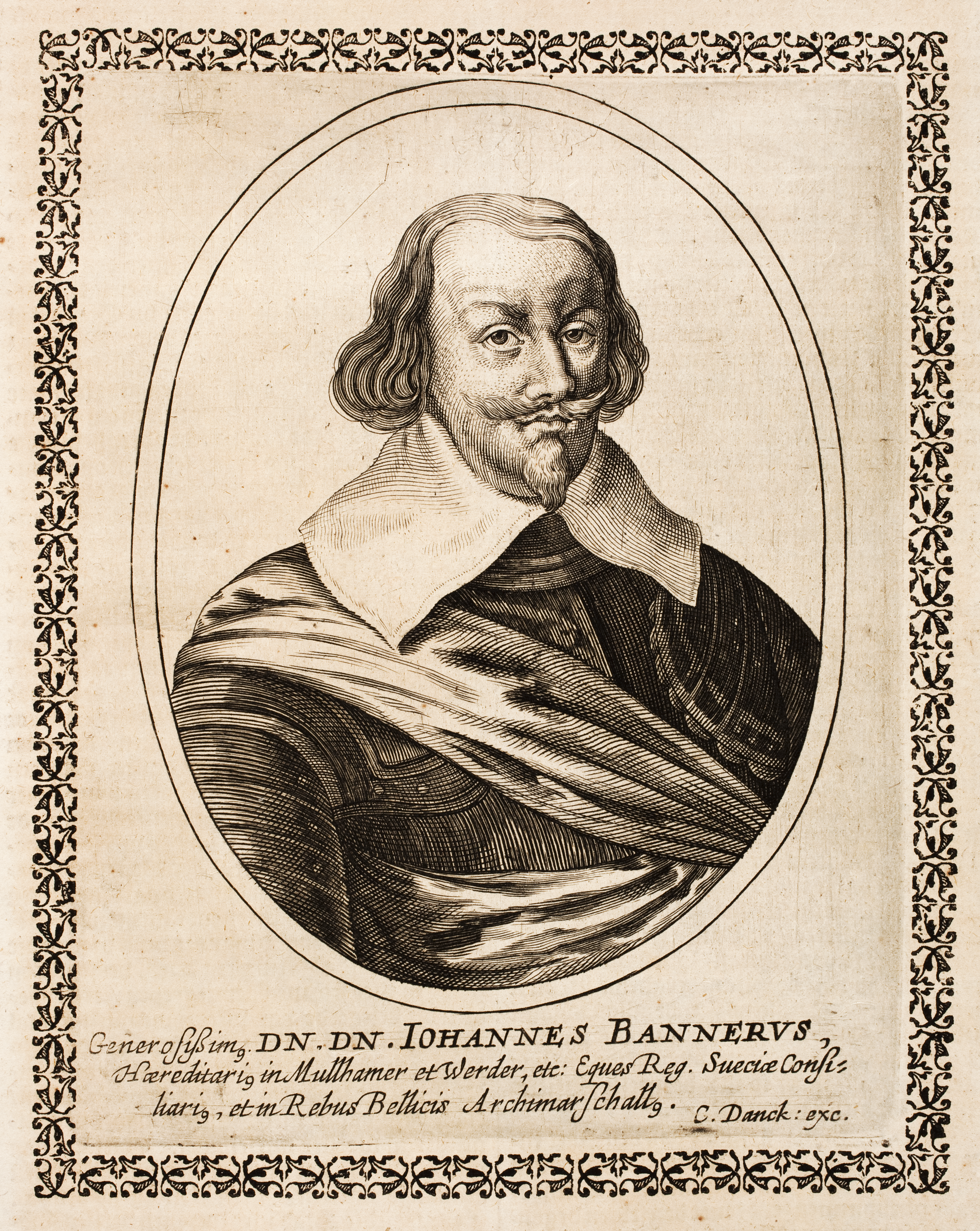
Engraving of Johan Banér

Johan Banér (23 June 1596 – 10 May 1641) was a Swedish field marshal and one of the leading commanders of the Thirty Years' War. He served under Gustavus Adolphus and rose to command Swedish forces in Germany after the defeat at Nördlingen in 1634. Banér restored Swedish fortunes with major victories at Wittstock in 1636 and Chemnitz in 1639, and remained an important Swedish commander until his death in 1641.

== Early life ==
Johan Banér was born at Djursholm Castle in Uppland. As a four-year-old he was forced to witness the execution of his father, the Privy Councillour Gustaf Banér, and uncle, Sten Axelsson Banér (also a Privy Councillour), at the Linköping Bloodbath in 1600, due to accusations of high treason by King Charles IX because of their support of King Sigismund. Though it was the father of King Gustavus Adolphus who had Banér's father executed, the two men developed a strong friendship from an early age, mostly due to Gustavus Adolphus reinstating the Banér family shortly after his coronation.

== Military career ==
Banér joined the Swedish Army in 1615, and distinguished himself during the Swedish Siege of Pskov.

He served with distinction in wars against the Tsardom of Russia and the Polish–Lithuanian Commonwealth, and had reached the rank of colonel by the age of 25.

In 1630, Gustavus Adolphus landed in the German lands of Pomerania to support Protestant forces in the Thirty Years' War. As one of the king's chief subordinates, Banér served in the campaigns in northern Germany and commanded the right wing of the Swedish cavalry at the Battle of Breitenfeld. He was present at the taking of Augsburg and Munich, and rendered conspicuous service at the Lech and at Donauwörth.

At the unsuccessful assault on Albrecht von Wallenstein's camp at the Alte Veste, Banér received a wound, and soon afterwards, when Gustavus marched towards Lützen, was left in command in the west, where he opposed the imperial general Johann von Aldringen. Two years later, as Swedish field marshal, Banér, with 16,000 men, entered Bohemia and, combining with the Saxon army, marched on Prague. However, the complete defeat of Bernard of Saxe-Weimar in the first Battle of Nördlingen stopped his victorious advance.

After this event, the Peace of Prague placed the Swedish army in a very precarious position, but the victories won by the united forces of Banér and Alexander Leslie at Wittstock (4 October 1636), restored the paramount influence of Sweden in central Germany. Banér, in his report to Queen Christina on the battle of Wittstock, stated the following: "[My soldiers] would have fallen into total disorder if Field-Marshal Leslie with the five brigades of foot which he had with him during the battle had not assisted us just in time and manfully attacked and turned 4 brigades of the enemy’s infantry away from us so that we could finally gain our breath".

However, the three combined armies were considerably inferior in force to those they had defeated, and in 1637 Banér was unable to make headway against the enemy. Rescuing with great difficulty the beleaguered garrison of Torgau, he retreated beyond the Oder into Pomerania.

In 1639, however, he again overran northern Germany, defeated the Saxons at Chemnitz and invaded Bohemia itself. The winter of 1640–1641 Banér spent in the west. His last achievement was an audacious coup de main on the Danube. Breaking camp in mid-winter (a very rare event in the 17th century), he united with the French under the Comte de Guébriant and surprised Regensburg, where the Diet was sitting. Only the break-up of the ice prevented the capture of the place. Banér thereupon had to retreat to Halberstadt. Here, on 10 May 1641, he died, possibly due to advanced liver cirrhosis caused by his excessive alcohol consumption, after designating Lennart Torstenson as his successor. He was much beloved by his men, who bore his body with them on the field of Wolfenbüttel. On the other hand, the enemies of Sweden rejoiced and a parody requiem hoping that he was burning in hell was even composed in Bohemia, which had been badly pillaged by Banér. He was buried at the Riddarholmen Church in Stockholm, where his armour is also on display.

== Assessment ==
Banér as a general achieved his best results during the reign of Queen Christina under the command of Axel Oxenstierna. Because it can be claimed there were different reasons for victory in the Swedish victory at Wittstock (as testified by his differing reports of 1636 and 1640) the battle of Chemnitz may well have been his finest hour. He reputedly declined tempting offers that were made to him by the emperor to induce him to enter his service.

== Family ==
In 1623, Banér married Catharina Elisabeth von Pfuel (1598–1636), Lady in waiting of Maria Eleonora of Sweden and daughter of Adam von Pfuel zu Johansfelde und Vichel and his wife, Barbara von Burgsdorff.

She died on 20 February 1636. On 25 July 1636 Banér married Countess Elisabeth Juliana von Erbach (1600–1640), widow of Count Georg Ludwig von Löwenstein-Scharfeneck (1587–1633) and daughter of George III, Count of Erbach-Breuberg and his wife, Countess Maria von Barby-Mühlingen (1563–1619).

After the death of his second wife, he married for the third time to Margravine Johanna von Baden-Durlach (1623–1661). He had children only with his first wife. His son from his first marriage, Gustaf Adam (1624–1681) received the dignity of Count Banér af Sortavala.

== General and cited references ==
- Oxenstierna, Axel (1888). Rikskansleren Axel Oxenstiernas Skrifter och Brefvexling. Vol. VI (Second Series, 13 vol. ed.). Stockholm. pp. 856–866.

Attribution:
