= Heathfield School, Ascot =

Heathfield School

Location
- London Road; Ascot, Berkshire, SL5 8BQ; England; 51.4138°N 0.7098°W

Information
- Type: Independent boarding and day school
- Motto: The Merit of One is the Honour of All
- Religious affiliation: Church of England
- Established: 1899
- Founder: Eleanor Beatrice Wyatt
- Local authority: Bracknell Forest
- Department for Education URN: 110117 Tables
- Headmaster: Jonathan Williams
- Gender: Co-Education
- Age: 11 to 18
- Enrolment: 240
- Houses: Austen de Valois; Seacole; Somerville
- Former pupils: HOGS & SMOGS
- Website: www.heathfieldschool.net

Heathfield School is a co-education independent boarding and day school in Ascot, Berkshire, England. In 2006, the school absorbed St Mary's School, Wantage and was briefly named Heathfield St Mary's School but reverted to Heathfield School in 2009 to prevent confusion with another local girls' school St Mary's School, Ascot. The school's grounds cover 36 acres (15 ha) situated on the edge of Ascot (actually in Bracknell Forest), providing access from London, the major airports, the M3 and M4 motorways.

== History ==
=== Heathfield Ascot ===
The school stands in 36 acres of grounds on the outskirts of Ascot and has done so since Heathfield School was founded in 1899 by Eleanor Beatrice Wyatt, its first headmistress. In 1882, at the age of 24, Miss Wyatt and her mother had opened Queen's Gate School in South Kensington, London.

=== St Mary's Wantage ===
The Reverend William John Butler became Vicar of Wantage on 1 January 1847. His main aims were, first, to revive the religious life in England and second, to improve education. He hoped to achieve these aims by setting up an order of teaching sisters, but he faced many disappointments and spent 25 years trying to improve various day schools in the parish before St Mary's School was founded in 1873.

The school was run by the sisters of the Community of St Mary the Virgin and was based in the Queen Anne house on Newbury Street. Sister Ellen was the first Sister-in-Charge and Sister Juliana succeeded her in 1887. Sister Juliana had studied at Cambridge and set a high standard for the girls, entering them for the Oxford and Cambridge local examinations.

Sister Annie Louisa joined the school in 1898 and started a guide movement called Scout Patrols in 1899 before Boy Scouts had even begun. She succeeded Sister Juliana as Headmistress in 1903. Sister Annie Louisa was responsible for the chief structural improvements at St Mary's including a science wing and the conversion of an old barn into a gymnasium. By the time Sister Annie Louisa left in 1919, St Mary's was recognised as a "public school with an unusually high standard of scholarship".

== Facilities ==
The school is equipped with teaching, sporting and leisure facilities. In 2000, the school opened a 25m indoor heated swimming pool.

In the summer of 2014, work started on a new STEM (Science, Technology, Engineering & Mathematics) building, providing a hub for the girls to study science subjects.

== Academic ==
The 2018 ISI Inspection report noted that "The quality of pupils' academic and other achievements is excellent" and commended the pupils' enthusiastic committed approach to their learning. It also found the quality of the pupils' personal development excellent. "The overall achievement of the pupils is excellent and represents the successful fulfilment of the school's ambitious aims."

== Houses ==
All pupils are placed in one of the four houses upon entry. A Head of House looks after the pupil's and is the first point of contact for parents and pupil's on issues.

House	Colour
Austen	
de Valois	
Seacole	
Somerville	

== Boarding ==
The boarding houses are separate from the house system. Instead, boarders are grouped into houses by years; Bronte Form I-II, Wantage Form III-IV, Phoenix Form V and LVI, Wyatt UVI. Boarders in Wyatt House live in separate accommodation similar to that of a hall of residence to prepare them for university life. Heathfield School started accepting day girls who resided locally from the 2015–16 academic year onwards.

== Notable former pupils ==
- Alexandra Hamilton, Duchess of Abercorn
- Eileen Agar, surrealist artist
- Alexandra, Queen Consort of Yugoslavia
- Isabella Anstruther-Gough-Calthorpe, model and socialite
- Marisa Berenson, actress
- Isabella Blow, fashion editor
- Harriet Bridgeman, Viscountess Bridgeman, founder of Bridgeman Art Library
- Nina Campbell, interior designer
- Susannah Constantine, fashion advisor and author
- Davina Ingrams, 18th Baroness Darcy de Knayth
- Martine Franck, photographer
- Victoria Glendinning, novelist and broadcaster
- Lucinda Green, three-day eventer
- Daphne Guinness
- Phyllis Hartnoll, poet
- Judith Keppel, quiz panellist, first million-pound winner of Who wants to be a millionaire?
- Amber Le Bon, daughter of Duran Duran's Simon Le Bon and supermodel Yasmin Le Bon
- Tara Lee, yoga instructor
- Tiggy Legge-Bourke, nanny to Princes William and Harry
- Serena Armstrong-Jones, Countess of Snowdon
- Candida Lycett Green, daughter of Sir John Betjeman, horsewoman and writer
- Susan Cunliffe-Lister, Baroness Masham of Ilton
- Tamara Mellon, CEO of Jimmy Choo
- Sienna Miller, actress
- Tessa Montgomery, Viscountess Montgomery of Alamein
- Emma Nicholson, Baroness Nicholson of Winterbourne, politician
- Princess Alexandra, The Honourable Lady Ogilvy, cousin of Queen Elizabeth II
- Alice Orr-Ewing, actress
- Flora Fraser, 21st Lady Saltoun
- Lady Henrietta Spencer-Churchill, daughter of the 11th Duke of Marlborough and interior designer
- Rosie Stancer (née Clayton), polar adventurer
- Tara Summers, actress
- Lady Helen Taylor
- Susan Travers, served with the French Foreign Legion
- Natalia Grosvenor, Duchess of Westminster
- Dame Jane Whiteley
- Judith Wilcox, Baroness Wilcox
- Gabriella Wilde, actress
