= Violet Herbert, Countess of Powis =

British peeress

The Right Honourable The Countess of Powis
- Lady Powis dressed for the coronation of King Edward VII in 1902.
- Born: 6 January 1865; Wellesbourne, Warwickshire, England
- Died: 29 April 1929 (aged 64)
- Burial place: Christ Church, Welshpool
- Title: suo jure 16th Baroness Darcy de Knayth; Countess of Powis
- Spouse: George Herbert, 4th Earl of Powis
- Children: Percy Herbert, Viscount Clive; Mervyn Herbert, Viscount Clive; Hon. Hermione Gwladys
- Parent(s): Sackville Lane-Fox, 12th Baron Conyers; Mary Curteis

Violet Ida Eveline Herbert, Countess of Powis and suo jure 16th Baroness Darcy de Knayth (1 June 1865 – 29 April 1929) was a British peeress in her own right.

== Early life ==
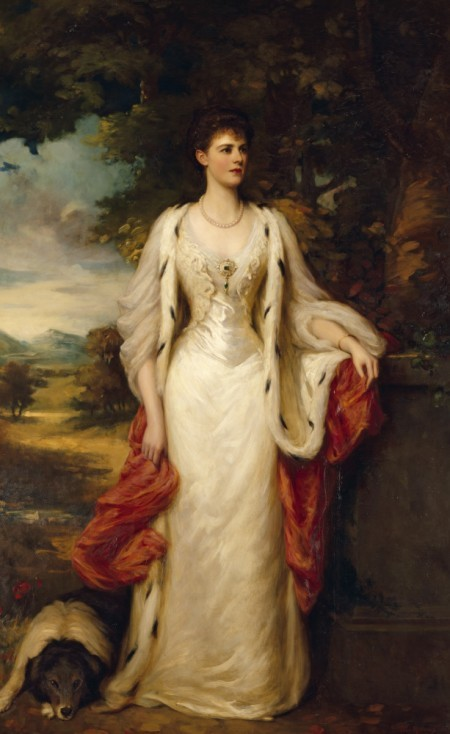
Violet Herbert, Countess of Powis by Ellis Roberts. ca. 1887

Violet was born on 1 June 1865 in Wellesbourne, Warwickshire, England. Lady Powis was the youngest child of Sackville Lane-Fox, 12th Baron Conyers, and his wife, Mary Curteis. Her sister, Hon. Marcia Lane-Fox, became the Countess of Yarborough, and her brother, Hon. Sackville Fitzroy Henry Lane-Fox, died at age 18 at Durban, South Africa. Her paternal grandparents were Sackville Walter Lane-Fox and Lady Charlotte Mary Anne Georgiana Osborne (daughter of George Osborne, 6th Duke of Leeds).

== Barony of Darcy de Knayth ==
In 1888, Lady Powis' father died and the baronies of Darcy de Knayth and Conyers fell into abeyance between his two daughters. On 8 June 1892, the abeyance of the Barony of Conyers was terminated in favour of the Countess of Yarborough. Eleven years later, on 29 September 1903, the Barony of Fauconberg (a title which had been in abeyance since the death of the last holder, the 6th Baroness Fauconberg in 1490), was also granted to Lady Yarborough. On the same date, the House of Lords also agreed that their father had held the Barony of Darcy de Knayth, which was granted to Lady Powis.

== Personal life ==
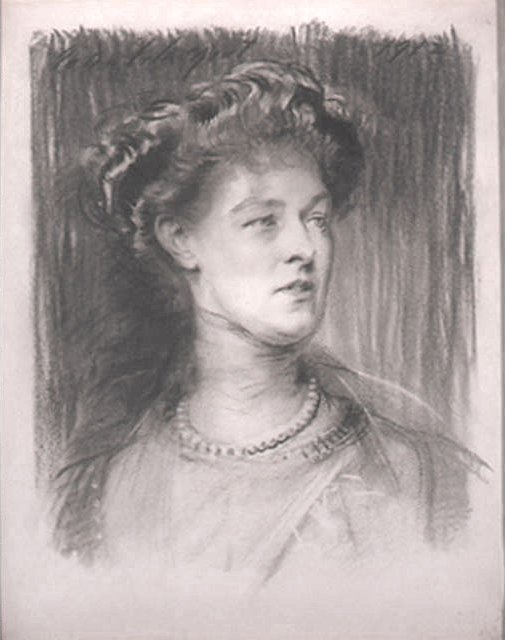
Portrait of the Hon. Violet Lane-Fox, Baroness Darcy de Knayth, Countess of Powis, a charcoal drawing by John Singer Sargent c. 1910–1914. Private collection by descent. Purchased through Antony Mould Contemporary. Located at Powis Castle.

On 21 August 1890, she married George Herbert (who succeeded his uncle as Earl of Powis six months later) at St George's, Hanover Square, London, England. Lady Powis persuaded her husband to entrust the entire management of the deteriorating gardens at Powis Castle to her in 1911. Over the next 18 years, she effectively recreated the gardens of Powis into the internationally renowned form that they have today.

The Earl and Countess of Powis had three children:

- Percy Robert Herbert, Viscount Clive (1892–1916), died of wounds received at the Somme.
- Lady Hermione Gwladys (1900 – 1995), married Roberto Lucchesi-Palli, 11th Duke della Grazia and 13th Prince di Campofranco. They had one daughter.
- Hon. Mervyn Horatio Herbert, Viscount Clive, 17th Baron Darcy de Knayth (1904–1943), father of Davina Ingrams, 18th Baroness Darcy de Knayth.

Lady Powis died in 1929, age 64, in a motorcar accident, and was buried in the churchyard of Christ Church in Welshpool. Her eldest surviving son, Mervyn, succeeded to the title.

Peerage of England
Preceded by Abeyant (Sackville Lane-Fox)	Baroness Darcy de Knayth; 1903 – 1929	Succeeded by Mervyn Herbert
