= Mervyn Herbert, Viscount Clive =

British peer and Royal Air Force officer

Mervyn Horatio Herbert, 17th Baron Darcy de Knayth, styled Viscount Clive (7 May 1904 – 23 March 1943), was a British peer and Royal Air Force officer.

== Early life ==
Styled the Honourable Mervyn Horatio Herbert from birth, he was the second son of George Herbert, 4th Earl of Powis, and his wife Violet, suo jure 16th Baroness Darcy de Knayth. His elder brother Percy, twelve years his senior, died of wounds received in the Battle of the Somme in 1916, at which point Mervyn became heir to his father's title Earl of Powis and took the courtesy title Viscount Clive.

In 1929, at the death of his mother, he inherited the title of Baron Darcy de Knayth, making him a peer in his own right (while retaining the higher title of Viscount Clive by courtesy).

== Career ==
Mervyn was educated at Eton College and Trinity College, Cambridge, graduating as B.A. He then studied law at the Inner Temple and was called to the bar as a barrister in 1929. He was also a justice of the peace for the county of Shropshire, where he owned Styche Hall near Market Drayton, birthplace home of his direct ancestor Robert Clive, 1st Baron Clive.

Mervyn followed in his brother's footsteps by fighting for Britain, gaining the rank of Squadron Leader in the Royal Air Force Volunteer Reserve. A recreational aviator, he enlisted at the outbreak of the Second World War in 1939 as an Aircraftsman, was promoted Flight Sergeant and later commissioned. At time of his death, he was serving with No. 157 Squadron RAF, a Mosquito night fighter squadron then based at RAF Bradwell Bay, Essex.

He died in 1943, aged thirty-eight, while flying on active service, and was buried in the churchyard of Christ Church, Welshpool. He was participating in a training night exercise when his Mosquito intercepted a Stirling bomber returning from a leaflet dropping raid in Europe, following which the Mosquito crashed into the ground near Manningtree, Essex, killing both Herbert and his navigator Albert Eastwood. There were suggestions friendly fire from the Stirling or anti-aircraft guns caused the crash.

== Personal life ==
In 1934, he married Vida Cuthbert (1910–2003), daughter of Capt. James Cuthbert DSO, later lady-in-waiting to the Duchess of Gloucester. They had a daughter, Davina (1938–2008). Upon his death, Lord Clive's barony passed to his four-year-old daughter. His father was left without a son so on his death his earldom passed to a distant cousin. In 1946, the widowed Lady Clive remarried, to Brigadier Derek Schreiber, chief of staff to the Governor-General of Australia.

Peerage of England
Preceded by Violet Herbert	Baron Darcy de Knayth; 1929–1943	Succeeded by Davina Ingrams
