= Ipa-Nima =

Ipa-Nima is a designer fashion brand founded in 1997 by former Hong Kong litigator Christina Yu. It includes accessories and shoes. She moved to Hanoi, Vietnam in 1995 and briefly worked for other designers before launching her own band in 1997.

Among the clients who buy these designer items are Hillary Rodham-Clinton and her daughter Chelsea Clinton, Jamie Lee Curtis, Bai Ling, Yasmin Le Bon, Michelle Yeoh, Cate Blanchett, Maggie Cheung and Faye Wong.
