= Baroness Wilcox =

Baroness Wilcox may refer to:

- Judith Wilcox, Baroness Wilcox (born 1939), British businesswoman
- Debbie Wilcox, Baroness Wilcox of Newport (born 1969), Welsh councillor and teacher
