= George Herbert, 4th Earl of Powis =

British peer (1862–1952)

The Right Honourable The Earl of Powis DL JP
- Portrait by Walter Stoneman, 1925

Lord Lieutenant of Shropshire
- In office 1896–1951
- Preceded by: The Earl of Bradford
- Succeeded by: The Viscount Bridgeman

Personal details
- Born: George Charles Herbert; 24 June 1862 Mayfair, London
- Died: 9 November 1952 (aged 90) Powis Castle
- Spouse: Violet, Baroness Darcy de Knayth (m. 1890; died 1929)
- Relations: Edward Herbert, 3rd Earl of Powis (uncle); William Petty-FitzMaurice, Earl of Kerry (grandfather)
- Parent(s): Sir Percy Herbert; Lady Mary Petty-FitzMaurice
- Education: Eton College; St John's College, Cambridge

George Charles Herbert, 4th Earl of Powis, DL, JP (24 June 1862 – 9 November 1952), known as George Herbert until 1891, was a British peer.

== Early life ==
Herbert was born at Number 26, Bruton Street, Mayfair, London, and baptised at St George's, Hanover Square. He was the son of The Hon. Sir Percy Egerton Herbert and Lady Mary Caroline Louisa Thomas Petty-FitzMaurice, daughter of the Earl of Kerry (the eldest son of Henry Petty-Fitzmaurice, 3rd Marquess of Lansdowne). He succeeded his uncle the 3rd Earl in the peerage in 1891.

He was educated at Eton College and at St John's College, Cambridge, where he graduated BA in 1885 and MA in 1905.

== Career ==
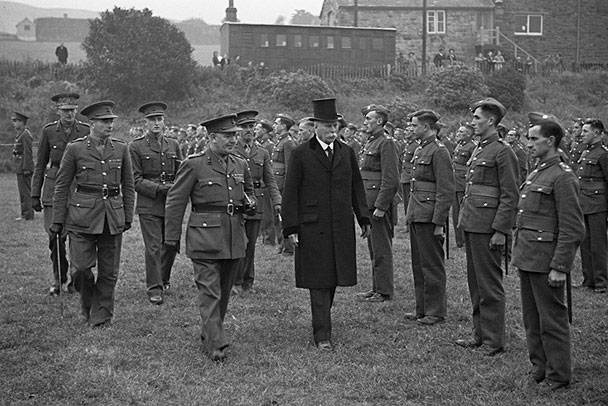
The 4th Earl inspects the troops at Royal Welch Fusiliers parade, Newtown (1939)

After gaining of his first degree, he was employed as a civil servant in the administrative branch of the General Post Office (the GPO) in London, but resigned after succeeding to his peerage.

He was appointed Lord Lieutenant of Shropshire in 1896, a post he held until 1951. He was also a Deputy Lieutenant for the county of Montgomeryshire and JP for the counties of Montgomeryshire and Shropshire, and Alderman of Shropshire County Council. He was Bailiff Grand Cross of the Order of St John of Jerusalem.

In 1897 he served as treasurer of the Salop Infirmary in Shrewsbury. In 1898 he was made Honorary Colonel of the 4th (Royal Montgomeryshire Militia) Battalion, South Wales Borderers.

== Personal life ==
Violet Herbert, Countess of Powis

In 1890, six months before inheriting the earldom, Herbert was married to The Hon. Violet Ida Evelyn Lane-Fox (1865–1929), the second daughter of The 15th Baron Darcy de Knayth. Violet's older sister, Hon. Marcia Lane-Fox, was married Charles Pelham, 4th Earl of Yarborough. Together, George and Violet were the parents of two sons and one daughter:

- Percy Robert, Viscount Clive (1892–1916), who died of wounds received at the Battle of the Somme in World War I.
- Lady Hermione Gwladys (1900–1995), who married Roberto Lucchesi-Palli, 11th Duke della Grazia and 13th Prince di Campofranco.
- Mervyn Herbert, Viscount Clive (1904–1943), who was killed while on active service in World War II.

Lord Powis died at Powis Castle in November 1952, aged 90, and was buried in the churchyard at Christ Church, Welshpool. He was succeeded in the earldom by his first cousin's eldest son, Edward Robert Henry Herbert.

== Succession to titles and estates ==
The Earl was fated to survive both his sons, the elder of whom died during World War I and the younger during World War II. While the earldom passed to his first cousin's son, the barony which had been conferred on Clive of India passed to the Earl's grandchild, Davina, daughter of his younger son, Mervyn.

Lord Powis bequeathed his family seat, Powis Castle near Welshpool, to The National Trust. The very high inheritance taxes which prevailed in the United Kingdom in the post-war years may have influenced his decision. His heir, the 5th Earl, came to an understanding with the National Trust and took up residence at Powis Castle. Since the death of the 6th Earl (Christian Victor Charles Herbert) in 1988, the Earl and his family no longer reside in Powis castle.

Political offices
Preceded by The Earl of Bradford	Lord Lieutenant of Shropshire; 1896–1951	Succeeded by The Viscount Bridgeman
Peerage of the United Kingdom
Preceded by Edward Herbert	Earl of Powis; 1891–1952	Succeeded by Edward Herbert
