= Frances Lambert (needleworker) =

British embroiderer and knitter (1798–1880)

- Born: 29 November 1798; London
- Died: 1 August 1880 (aged 81); Marylebone
- Other name: Frances Sedgewick
- Occupation: needleworker
- Known for: ‘embroiderer in general’ and ‘needlewoman in ordinary to Queen Victoria’
- Spouse: John Bell Sedgwick

Frances Lambert became Frances Sedgwick (29 November 1798 – 1 August 1880) was a British embroiderer, knitter and author. She was embroiderer in general and "needlewoman in ordinary" to Queen Victoria. She published in London and New York where she advised on crochet, embroidery and knitting. She was said to be the most popular writer on needlework in nineteenth century America.

== Life ==
Lambert was born in London in 1798. Her mother was also named Frances (born Stunt), and her father was Thomas Lambert and he was skilled with lace. The family business was making "military trimmings" and she learned the textile skills required to create them. By 1820 she had her first business creating these trimmings at 15 Coventry Street in London.

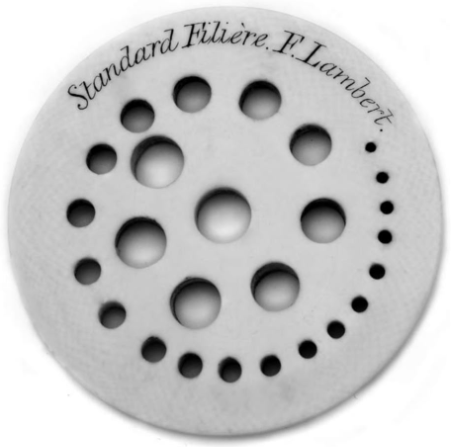
Standard Filiere for knitting needles by Frances Lambert in 1842

She married John Bell Sedgwick, a gentleman, in 1836. She enjoyed the business of Queen Adelaide and she was appointed "embroiderer in general" and "needlewoman in ordinary’" to Queen Victoria in 1837.

She has a substantial role in the history of knitting. It is said that she was the first to advise knitters on getting the correct tension which she rather vaguely described as "medium". On the subject of knitting needles she was much more specific and she advised her knitters to own a knitting needle gauge. She published "The Handbook of Knitting" which was published in London and New York in 1842. It is held in a Philadelphia library was the earliest book with knitting patterns. She became the most popular writer on needlework in nineteenth century America. Her 1844 book on Church Embroidery was said to have had great influence on Agnes Blencowe's Ladies Ecclesiastical Embroidery Society which was formed in 1854.

Lambert sold her stocks in 1847. Anastasia Marie Dolby and Mrs Frances Purcell bought the lease of Lambert's premises and the goodwill of her business, at 3 New Burlington Street, because she was retiring. Dolby went on to be a leading figure in church embroidery.

Lambert died in 1880 in Marylebone, London.

== Publications ==
- Practical Hints on Decorative Needlework, London: John Murray (1840)
- The Hand-book of Needlework: Decorative and Ornamental including Crochet, Knitting and Netting Later republished as The Ladies Complete Guide to Needle-Work and Embroidery Containing Clear and Practical Instructions, Philadelphia: T.B. Peterson (1859).
- My Knitting Book, London: John Murray (1843).
- Church Needlework with Practical Remarks on its Arrangement and Preparation, London: John Murray (1844).
- My Crochet Sampler, London: John Murray (1848)
- Instructions for Making Miss Lambert’s Registered Crochet Flowers, London: John Murray (1852).
