= Agnes Blencowe =

Co-founder of the UK's Ladies' Ecclesiastical Embroidery Society (1817–1896)

Sister Agnes Blencowe CSMV
- Born: 13 April 1817; King's Lynn, England
- Died: 6 March 1896 (aged 78); Wantage, England
- Occupations: Housekeeper, embroiderer, and nun
- Known for: Founding the Ladies’ Ecclesiastical Embroidery Society

Agnes Blencowe CSMV (13 April 1817 – 6 March 1896) was the British co-founder of the Ladies’ Ecclesiastical Embroidery Society in 1854. She later joined the Community of St Mary the Virgin in Wantage as a Church of England nun.

== Life ==
Blencowe was born in 1817 in King's Lynn in Norfolk. She was one of eleven children. Her father was, in time, the mayor of King's Lynn. Her brother, Edward Everard Blencowe, who was over ten years older than her became the rector of West Walton and she went to live with him as his housekeeper. She was a skilled embroiderer and she was said to be the "best workwoman in England".

She was interested in churches and she joined the Ecclesiological Society. She took an interest in old examples of church textiles recording their details. The Ecclesiological society supported her publication of "Ecclesiastical Embroidery: Working Patterns of Flowers, of the Full Size, from Ancient Examples.

When George Edmund Street was early in his career as a Gothic revival architect he came to visit her brother. As a consequence Blencowe and Street's sister Mary Ann Street became friends as they were both interested in embroidery. Mary Ann Street and Agnes Blencowe founded the Ladies’ Ecclesiastical Embroidery Society in 1854. The members of the society gave their time freely to create embroideries for religious uses. They were not paid but funds were made available to buy the materials. The society restricted itself to only working on designs that had a historic basis or that were approved by an architect. The society approved for example of Augustus Pugin's revival of the gothic style. In return Pugin encouraged their work. The society is credited with inspiring other groups in other parishes run by the wives of architects and involving other volunteers.

George Edmund Street designed the Convent House for the Community of St Mary the Virgin in 1850 in Wantage. The community had been founded two years before by William John Butler, the vicar of Wantage and it was led by Harriet Day. Mary Ann Street became a nun in the community in about 1853. About ten years after Ann, Blencowe also professed. Their Ladies’ Ecclesiastical Embroidery Society merged with the Wantage Church Needlework Association in 1863. Other Anglican sisterhoods were formed who took an interest in church embroidery. Blencowe and Anastasia Dolby published on the subject. Blencowe ran Wardle's embroidery room for twenty years until her failing eyesight obliged her to retire. Blencowe died in 1896 in Wantage.
