= St Mary's School, Wantage =

Coordinates: 51°35′14″N 1°25′32″W

St Mary's School

Location
- 24-28 Newbury Street; Wantage, Oxfordshire, OX12 8BZ; England

Information
- Type: Private day and boarding school
- Religious affiliation: Church of England
- Established: 1873
- Founder: William J Butler
- Closed: 2007 (merged)
- Head teacher: Sue Sowden
- Gender: Girls
- Age: 11 to 18

St Mary's School was a private day and boarding girls' school located in Wantage, Oxfordshire, England. In 2007 it merged with Heathfield School to become Heathfield St Mary's School (later reverted to Heathfield) and the Wantage site was closed.

It was affiliated with the Church of England and had close ties with its founding order, the Community of St Mary the Virgin. It was predominantly a boarding school.

== History ==
The Reverend William John Butler became Vicar of Wantage on 1 January 1847. His main aims were, first, to revive the religious life in England and second, to improve education. He hoped to achieve these aims by setting up an order of teaching sisters, but he faced many disappointments and spent 25 years trying to improve various day schools in the parish before St Mary's School was founded in 1873.

Together with its sister school, the School of St Helen and St Katharine in Abingdon, St Mary's was run by the sisters of the Community of St Mary the Virgin and was based in the Queen Anne house on Newbury Street. Sister Ellen was the first Sister-in-Charge and Sister Juliana succeeded her in 1887. Sister Juliana had studied at Cambridge and set a high standard for the girls, entering them for the Oxford and Cambridge local examinations.

Sister Annie Louisa joined the school in 1898 and started a guide movement called Scout Patrols in 1899 before Boy Scouts had even begun. She succeeded Sister Juliana as Headmistress in 1903. Sister Annie Louisa was responsible for the chief structural improvements at St Mary's including a science wing and the conversion of an old barn into a gymnasium. By the time Sister Annie Louisa left in 1919, St Mary's was recognised as a “public school with an unusually high standard of scholarship”.

In 2005 the buildings were purchased for around £15m by the property developer Anton Bilton and his company, Raven Mount. The transaction was said to be necessary to increase the size of the school and modernise facilities. However, in 2006 it was announced that the school would be merging with the Heathfield School in Ascot, to form a new school, Heathfield St Mary's and the Wantage site was closed at the end of the summer term 2007.

== Notable alumnae ==
- Serena Armstrong-Jones, Countess of Snowdon
- Harriet Bridgeman, Viscountess Bridgeman, founder of Bridgeman Art Library
- Lady Moyra Campbell, aristocrat and courtier
- Diana Churchill, actress
- Susannah Constantine, fashion advisor and author
- Margaret Cooper (1918-2016), cryptographer
- Flora Fraser, 21st Lady Saltoun
- Hon. Victoria Glendinning, novelist and broadcaster
- Lucinda Green, three-day eventer
- Natalia Grosvenor, Duchess of Westminster
- Hon. Daphne Guinness, socialite
- Alexandra Hamilton, Duchess of Abercorn
- Dame Ruth Railton, music director and conductor
- Phyllis Hartnoll, poet
- Kara-Louise Horne, Big Brother 8 contestant
- Davina Ingrams, 18th Baroness Darcy de Knayth, paralympic medalist in swimming and table tennis
- Judith Keppel, quiz panellist, first million-pound winner of Who wants to be a millionaire?
- Candida Lycett Green, writer
- Tessa Montgomery, Viscountess Montgomery of Alamein
- Emma Nicholson, Baroness Nicholson of Winterbourne, politician
- Lady Henrietta Spencer-Churchill, interior designer
- Lady Helen Taylor, minor royal
- Susan Travers, nurse and ambulance driver in world war 2
- Dame Jane Whiteley, widow of Ian Gow
- Judith Wilcox, Baroness Wilcox, businesswoman
