= Community of St Mary the Virgin =

Anglican Religious Community

The Community of St Mary the Virgin (CSMV) is an Anglican religious order based at Wantage in Oxfordshire, England. It was founded in 1848 by the vicar of Wantage, the Reverend William John Butler and is one of the oldest surviving religious communities in the Church of England.

== History ==
In the middle of the 19th century a spiritual revival known as the Oxford Movement began in the Church of England. Those involved came to be known as Anglo-Catholics whose aim was to recall the Church of England to its origins and to restore reverence and beauty in worship. Out of the Oxford Movement came the first religious orders to be founded since the Dissolution of the Monasteries by Henry VIII of England and among these the Community of St Mary the Virgin was one of the first.

The community was founded by William John Butler, the vicar of Wantage in 1848. He and Mother Harriet, the first superior, left their mark on the community. From the start there was an emphasis on simplicity of life. George Edmund Street designed the Convent House for the Community of St Mary the Virgin in 1850 in Wantage. Mary Ann Street became a nun in the community in about 1853. About ten years after Ann her friend Agnes Blencowe also professed. Ann and Agnes had founded the Ladies’ Ecclesiastical Embroidery Society which in 1863 merged with the Wantage Church Needlework Association.

The community grew over the years, with ministries in schools, mission houses and homes for the elderly and mothers & babies. Other ministries involved people with learning difficulties, young offenders and the rehabilitation of people with alcohol or drug addictions. Branch houses were started elsewhere in the United Kingdom and in India and South Africa, opening up many new ministry opportunities. A notable Mother General from 1940 to 1953 was the sculptor and artist Mother Maribel (1887-1970). Sister Penelope Lawson, a member of CSMV, corresponded with C. S. Lewis between August 1939 and September 1963.

In more recent times, as numbers grew smaller and institutional works were given up in favour of smaller houses and more individual ministries, the community became engaged in spiritual direction and leading retreats, assisting as hospital chaplains and ministry in parishes and schools.

The five main Daily Offices said or sung in the CSMV chapel (Lauds, Terce, Sext, Vespers and Compline) were streamed live on the internet until 15 December 2012, when the streaming ended after Compline, the final office of the day.

On 1 January 2013, eleven of the sisters of the community, including the mother superior, left the convent at Wantage to join the Personal Ordinariate of Our Lady of Walsingham, the Roman Catholic ordinariate in Britain established for former Anglicans.

== St Mary's Convent ==
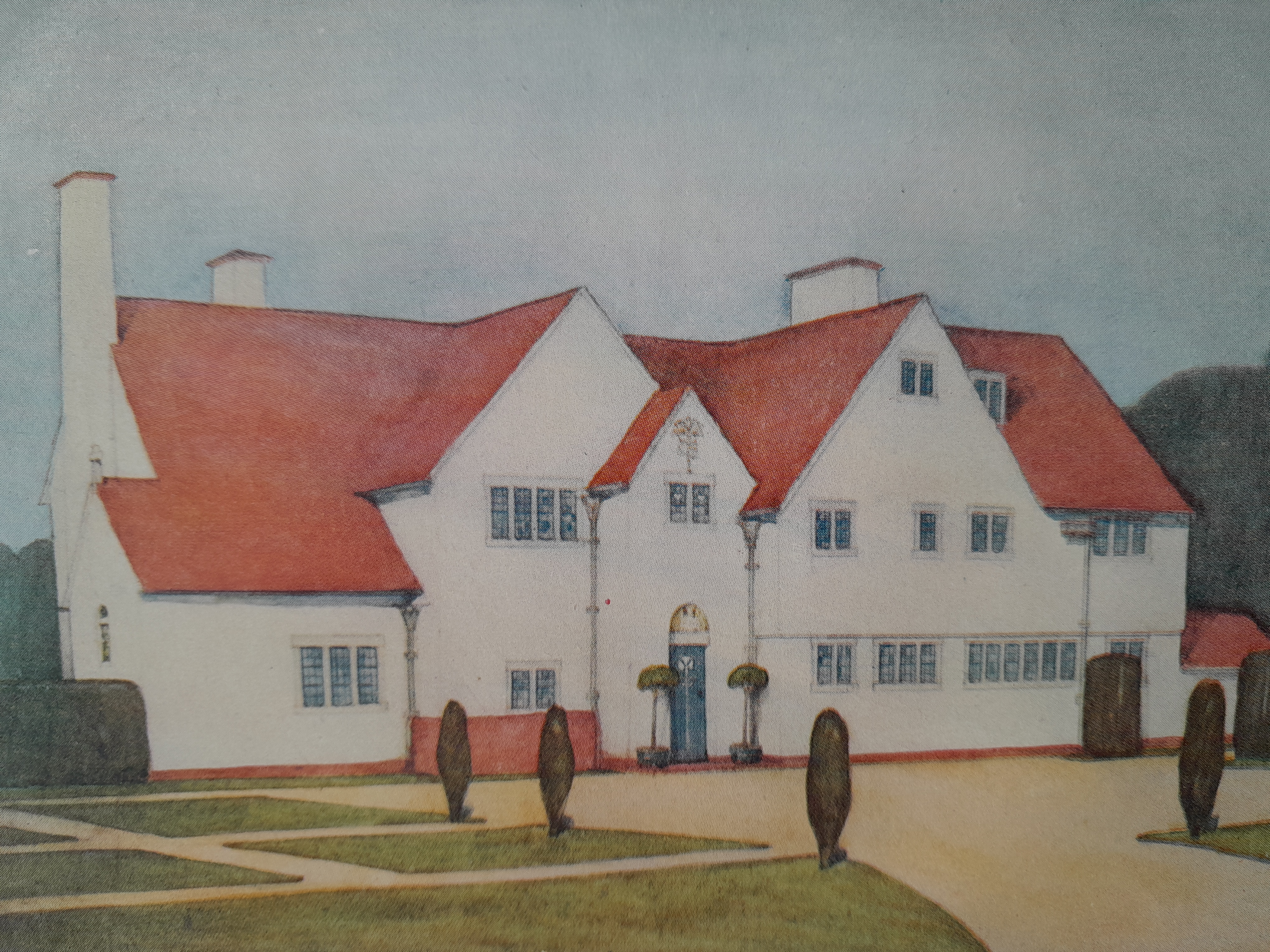
Chaplain's House, St Mary's Home, Wantage from a drawing by M.H. Baillie Scott, Architect

The original convent building in Wantage was built in 1855-6 by G. E. Street, with the Chapel of St Mary Magdalene, also by Street, added in 1858-61. The construction of a larger chapel by J. L. Pearson began in 1887. In 1922, the stone statue of the Virgin Mary was installed at the west end, carved by Sister Maribel. The east end of the chapel was reconfigured by Ninian Comper in 1923. Many of the convent buildings are Grade II and the chapel is Grade II*.

== William John Butler ==
William John Butler (1818–1894), a high church Anglican priest, was Vicar of Wantage from 1846, and several of his curates became notable clerics (e.g. Henry Parry Liddon). In 1880 he became a canon of Worcester and in 1885 Dean of Lincoln. He was offered the bishopric of Natal in 1864 but did not accept it. He was the founder of the community and continued as warden until his death.

== Work ==
Butler founded St Mary's School in Wantage, Oxfordshire in 1873. In 2007 St Mary's was absorbed into Heathfield School, an Anglican boarding school in Ascot, Berkshire.

The order founded St Helen's School in Abingdon in 1903. In 1938, St Helen's merged with the school of St Katharine in Wantage to become the School of St Helen and St Katharine, Abingdon.

== Bibliography ==
- Butler, William John (1897) Life and Letters of William John Butler; ed. by A. J. Butler. London: Macmillan
- Annie Louisa, Mother C.S.M.V. (1948) Butler of Wantage: his inheritance and his legacy; an offering from his Community of S. Mary the Virgin. Westminster: Dacre Press (author identified as A. L. Hoare in ODCC)
- Cross, F. L. (ed.) (1957) The Oxford Dictionary of the Christian Church. London: Oxford U. P.; p. 212 (gives foundation date as 1850)
