= Anastasia Dolby =

British embroiderer and writer

Anastasia Marie Dolby
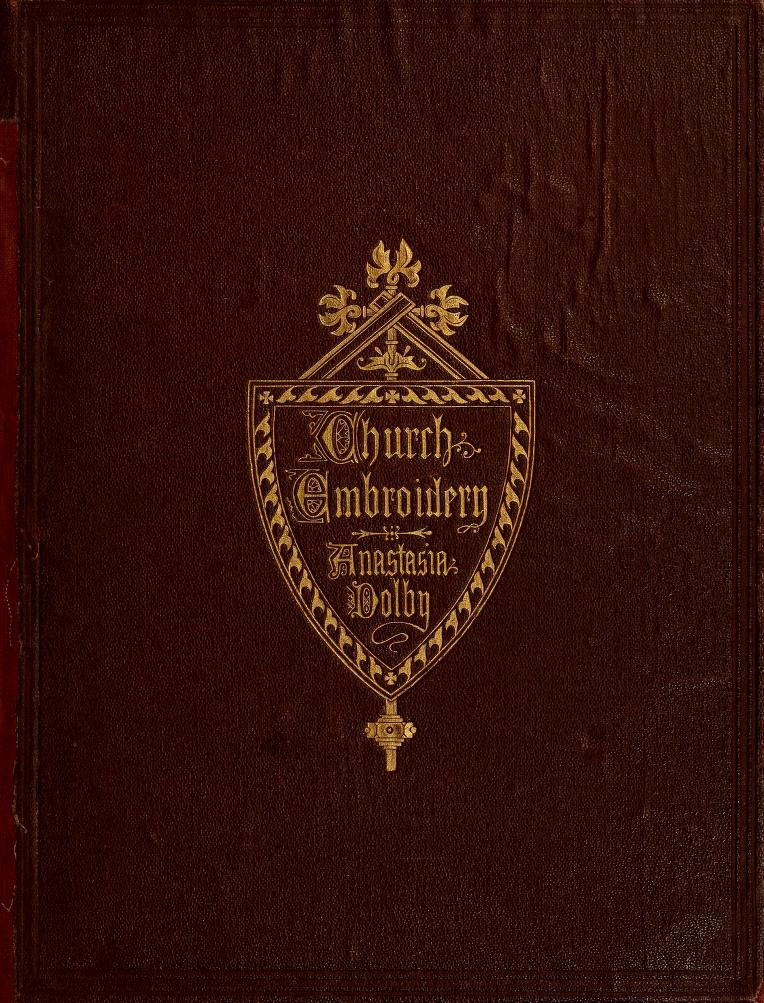
- cover of one of her books
- Born: Anastasia Marie Dolan c.1823 Westminster
- Died: 18 February 1873; Highgate
- Occupations: embroiderer, teacher and writer
- Employer: School of Art Needlework

Anastasia Marie Dolby born Anastasia Marie Dolan (c.1823 – 18 February 1873) was a leading British embroiderer and writer. She was the first teacher at the Royal School of Needlework.

== Life ==
Anastasia Dolan was born in 1824 in Westminster.

In 1847 she and Mrs Frances Purcell bought the lease of the premises and the goodwill of her business at 3 New Burlington Street from Frances Lambert who was retiring. Lambert had enjoyed a Royal appointment and had created a successful needlework business and published on different types of needlework including church embroidery.

In 1850, she married Edwin Thomas Dolby who was a printer's son. He was to become a noted watercolour artist and his sister, like her, served a twelve-year apprenticeship as an embroiderer. They lived with his parents at first. In 1859 her husband left the family business when they went to live in Marylebone.

Mary Ann Street and Agnes Blencowe founded the Ladies’ Ecclesiastical Embroidery Society in 1854. The society is credited with inspiring other groups to take an interest in church embroidery. These were run by volunteers including the wives of architects.

In 1867, Dolby published her book about church embroidery and in the following year she published another about the history and use of church vestments. Her husband drew many of the illustrations. Reviews recommend the book to women during the winter. The marketing for the books noted that she had been the "embroideress to the Queen". She had worked on presents that were given to the Queen but it does not appear that she ever enjoyed a Royal appointment. The book noted her admiration for the earlier work of Mary Linwood.

Lady Victoria Welby founded what eventually became the Royal School of Needlework, as the School of Art Needlework, in 1872. She employed her friend Dolby as the superintendent and instructor. Its initial premises was a small apartment on Sloane Street employing 20 women. Its first president was Princess Christian of Schleswig-Holstein, Queen Victoria's third daughter, known as Princess Helena.

Dolby died in the following year from breast cancer and she was survived by her husband.
