= Margaret Cooper (WRNS officer) =

Member of the Women's Royal Naval Service

- Born: Margaret Elizabeth Douglas; 25 January 1918; Punta del Este, Uruguay
- Died: 18 July 2016 (aged 98); Hamilton, Ontario, Canada
- Education: St Mary's School, Wantage, England
- Spouse: Craig Cooper
- Children: 4

Margaret Elizabeth Cooper (née Douglas; 25 January 1918 – 18 July 2016) was a member of the Women's Royal Naval Service during the Second World War who worked at the signal interception and deciphering centre at Bletchley Park, England.

== Early life and education ==
Cooper was born Margaret Elizabeth Douglas in Punta del Este, Uruguay, on 25 January 1918. Her father, Jack Douglas, originally from Canada, owned a beach house across the River Plate from Argentina, where he owned a beef ranch. Her mother Vera was Anglo-Argentinian, and she had three siblings, Katherine, Evelyn and Sholto Douglas. She was educated at St Mary's School, Wantage, in England.

== Career ==
Cooper joined the Women's Royal Naval Service ("Wrens") in September 1941. She was trained at Westfield College, London, and expected to become a cook but part way through her training a request was received, said to be from Winston Churchill himself, for volunteers to do unspecified secret work. Cooper and most of her class accepted and quickly found themselves at the signals interception and decoding base of Bletchley Park in central England and not the naval base they had expected.

At first she worked in Hut 11 on the bombes that decoded intercepted messages but in late 1942 she was moved to Stanmore where backup bombes were being set up as a precaution against the destruction of the originals by enemy bombing. She then became assistant to Frank Birch, head of the naval section in Hut 4, which was known as the "U-boat room". Cooper would also regularly liaise with the Admiralty's Operational Intelligence Centre in London. She was promoted to petty officer, and then commissioned as a third officer, after which in April 1944 she was sent to Plymouth to work at the underground base there at Mount Wise, liaising between Bletchley and Plymouth on the movements of U-boats. She never talked about her secret work until after the nature of the code-breaking operation was revealed by F.W. Winterbotham in The Ultra Secret (1974).

== Personal life ==
In 1945, she married Craig Cooper, a Royal Canadian Air Force officer, whom she had met three years earlier. Their initial meeting was a brief conversation on a platform at Bletchley railway station, but they did not even exchange names. Later in 1942, she received a letter addressed to "the blonde Wren from Argentina on the platform at Bletchley station".

They married in England, and he returned to his teaching career in Canada. They purchased Cherry Tree Farm, a 65-acre farm in Carlisle, Ontario, 10 miles (16 km) north of Burlington, where they raised beef cattle, horses, and had a cherry orchard. They had four children, Elizabeth Salton, Ian Cooper, Jane Toews and Peter Cooper.

Cooper died on 18 July 2016 at St. Peter's Hospice in Hamilton, aged 98.
