= Mother Maribel of Wantage =

English painter

Mother Maribel of Wantage renovating her carving of the 12th Station of the Cross in her 70s

Mother Maribel of Wantage (16 January 1887–29 January 1970) was an Anglican nun, artist and sculptor who was Mother General of the Community of St Mary the Virgin in Wantage from 1940 to 1953. Her artistic works, particularly her sculptures and carvings, are in many ecclesiastical buildings around the world.

== Biography ==
Born in 1887 as Mary Isabella Rough in Weymouth in Dorset, she was the daughter of William Edward Morrison Rough (1852–1899), a colonel in the 7th Dragoon Guards and Mary Isabella (née Sedgwick, 1853–1913). On the death of her father she, her mother and older brother moved to Southwold in Suffolk where she attended Saint Felix School. Known to family and friends as 'Toussa', on leaving school in 1903 aged 16 she won a scholarship to the Slade School of Fine Art in London, where she became an accomplished portrait painter. On leaving the Slade in 1907 she worked briefly and unsuccessfully as an assistant art mistress at Fulham High School. In 1908 she spent eight weeks touring Italy visiting Milan, Verona, Venice and Assisi among other places. In 1910 she visited Oberammergau for the Passion Play and while there she was introduced to carving in wood.

Returning to London, Maribel tried to make a living from her art but this was largely unsuccessful as it lacked the necessary commercial appeal. She planned a return to teaching art but her mother's final illness prevented this. In 1914 she toured Italy again before entering the Community of St Mary the Virgin in July of the same year. Here she started to sculpt including carvings of crucifixes, figures of Mary and the child Jesus and figures for the Christmas crib which can be found in many churches and cathedrals including St Paul's Cathedral. St Faith's church in Great Crosby holds her carving 'Rabbit Madonna' which takes its name from the rabbits at the feet of Mary and where the figure of the infant Jesus is a toe short on his right foot. It is said that to stop unwanted visitors from disturbing her while working she had a notice reading 'Sick Cow' hung on her workshop door. In 1931 she was appointed Novice Mistress and in October 1934 she visited India for five months to work at the Order's school in Khandala. In 1940 she was elected Mother General of the Community, and served in this post till 1953. In March 1945 she travelled by troopship to visit the Order's branch houses in India and South Africa, returning to the UK by aeroplane 11 months later. During her last years as Mother General she visited the Order's branch houses in the UK and returned to those in India and South Africa. Mother Maribel is credited with saying, "Silence is not a thing we make; it is something into which we enter. It is always there ... All we can make is noise."

A skilled artist in a variety of media Maribel painted the mural of the Ascension (1932) above the chancel arch in the church of St Katharine and St Peter in Milford Haven, Pembrokeshire. Her major work includes her carvings of the Stations of the Cross for one of the chapels at the convent at Wantage, which took 30 years to complete. Her archive is also held at the convent. A cast of her statue of Francis of Assisi with the Wolf of Gubbio can be found at St Margaret's church in Northam in Devon.

Mother Maribel died at the age of 83 in 1970. Her biography Mother Maribel of Wantage was first published in 1972.
