= Amber Le Bon =

English fashion model (born 1989)

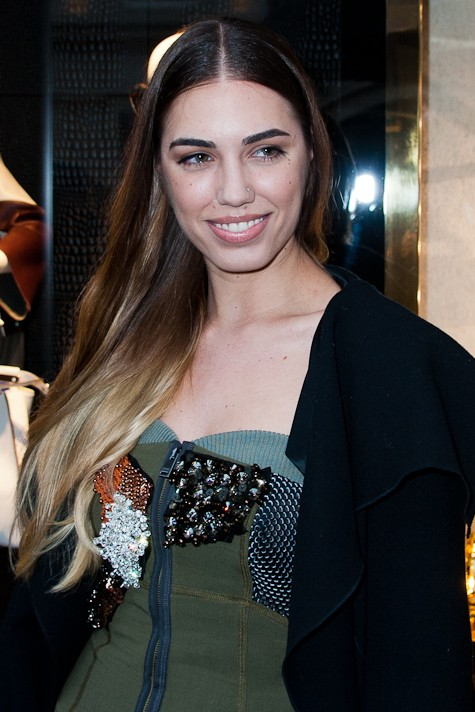
- Le Bon in 2014
- Born: Amber Rose Tamara Le Bon; 25 August 1989 (age 37); Westminster, London, England
- Occupation: Fashion model
- Modelling information
- Height: 5 ft 10 in (1.78 m)
- Hair colour: Brown
- Eye colour: Green

Amber Rose Tamara Le Bon (born 25 August 1989) is an English fashion model.

== Biography ==
Le Bon is the eldest child of Duran Duran lead singer Simon Le Bon and model Yasmin Le Bon. She was born at the Humana Wellington Hospital in St John's Wood, London and went to Newton Preparatory School in London in her early years before going to Heathfield School, Ascot, gaining A levels in Music, the History of Art and Photography.

In July 2009, she was voted the 'World's Hottest Celebrity Daughter' by visitors to Zootoday.com. Brands she has modelled for to date include Moschino and River Island. She was the face of Myla swimwear and fronted a campaign for shampoo brand Pantene.

Le Bon's maternal grandfather was Iranian. She has two younger sisters.
