= Newton Prep =

Coordinates: 51°28′38″N 0°08′44.3″W

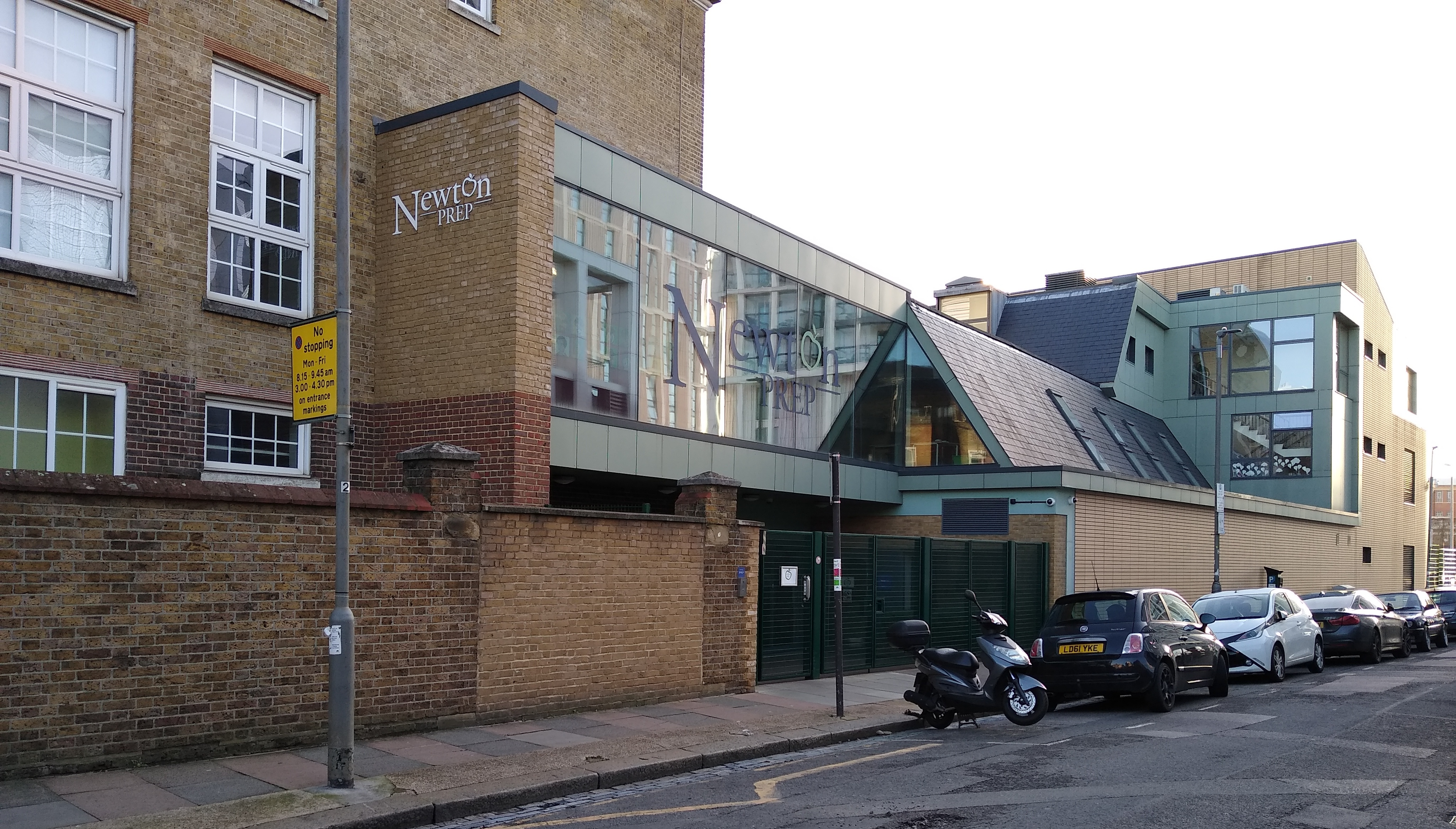

Location
- 149 Battersea Park Road; SW8 4BX

Information
- Established: 1991
- Ofsted: Reports
- Head teacher: Mr Graeme McCafferty
- Gender: Mixed
- Age: 3 to 13
- Enrollment: 657
- Capacity: 665
- Houses: Crispin (Yellow) Nonsuch (Green) Spartan (Red) Winston (Blue)
- Website: www.newtonprepschool.co.uk

Newton Prep School is located in Battersea, South London. It opened in September, 1991 with 70 pupils. The founder is Dr Farouk Walji. Newton Prep has over 600 pupils. It accepts pupils aged 3 to 13, from nursery until year 8.

Since its foundation, the school has always specialised in providing for children of high ability. The first headmaster was Jim Cussell, formerly headmaster of Moreton Hall School, Shropshire. The subsequent headmaster, Richard Dell (1993 to 2006), had interests in spirituality and healing and self-published a book in relation to this. The headmaster from 2006 to 2013 was Nicholas Allen. He was previously head of Ipswich Preparatory School and Arnold House School. The current head, Alison Fleming, was appointed in 2013.

The school has three main segments: the Apple Nursery (age 3 to 4), Lower School (Reception to Year 2) and Upper School (Year 3 to Year 8).

The school is based in an Edwardian building, formerly occupied by Clapham College, Raywood Street School and Notre Dame School. The original building has been extended and renovated, most recently in 2013. The facilities include a 300-seat auditorium opened by Sir Peter Hall, a library with a full-time librarian, an astro-turf sports pitch, and two gymnasiums.

The Newton Scholarship Fund (NSF) is a registered charity that offers means-tested bursaries to support children of scholarship ability.

== Notable former pupils ==
- Amber Le Bon (born 1989), English model
