= West Walton =

Village in Norfolk, England

Coordinates: 52.69725°N 0.17664°E

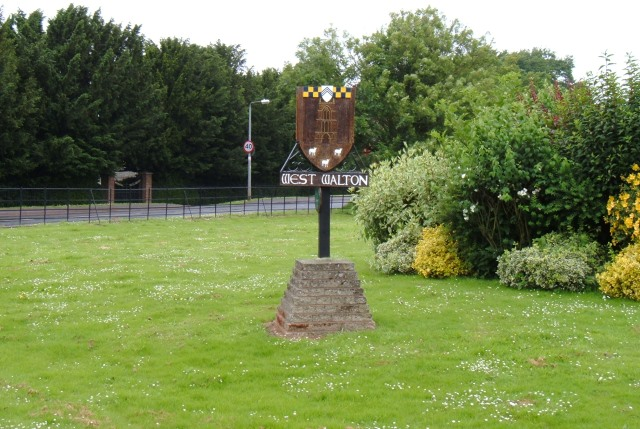
- The village sign, West Walton, Norfolk

- Location within Norfolk
- Area: 15.77 km^{2} (6.09 sq mi)
- Population: 1,731 (parish, 2011 census)
  - Density: 110/km^{2} (280/sq mi)
- OS grid reference: TF4713
  - London: 80 miles (130 km)
- Civil parish: West walton
- District: King's Lynn and West Norfolk
- Shire county: Norfolk
- Region: East
- Country: England
- Sovereign state: United Kingdom
- Post town: WISBECH
- Postcode district: PE14
- Dialling code: 01945
- Police: Norfolk
- Fire: Norfolk
- Ambulance: East of England
- UK Parliament: South West Norfolk

West Walton is a village and civil parish in the King's Lynn and West Norfolk District of Norfolk, England.

The parish of West Walton, in the 2001 Census, had a population of 1,659, increasing to 1,731 at the 2011 Census.

== History ==
The name West Walton is thought by James Rye to derive from the Old English meaning of the 'settlement by the wall' which refers to the village's proximity to a Roman sea wall or defence.

West Walton was established by the time of the Norman Conquest. The village's population, land ownership and productive resources were detailed in its entry in the Domesday Book of 1085. In the great book West Walton is recorded by the name 'Waltuna'. The parish was held by William de Warenne with the Abbot of St Peter and St Paul, Cluny from him, The Abbot of Ely before and after 1066, and Oder from Ralph de Beufour. The survey mentions ½ church, 38 salt houses and 1100 sheep. The survey also records the presence of a fishery. In the Domesday survey fractions were used to indicate that the entry, in this case the church, was situated within more than one parish.

== Geography ==
The village and parish of West Walton is in the western part of the county of Norfolk. The western flank of the parish is also the county border between Norfolk and Cambridgeshire and is also the course of the River Nene. On the southern flank is the parish of Walsoken. To the north is Walpole and to the east is Marshland St James.

The village is 47 miles (80 km) west-north-west of Norwich, 10 miles (20 km) west-south-west of King's Lynn and 80 miles (100 km) north of London and its location makes it, along with Walsoken, the most westerly village in Norfolk. The nearest town is Wisbech which is 2 miles (3.2 km) south of the village. The nearest railway station is at Watlington, Norfolk for the Fen Line which runs between King's Lynn and Cambridge. The nearest airport is Norwich International Airport.

== Governance ==
For the purposes of local government, the parish falls within the district of King's Lynn and West Norfolk.

West Walton parish council has 11 councillors. The councillors elect a chair. West Walton is part of the electoral ward of Walton. The population of this ward at the 2011 Census was 2,641.

== Landmarks ==
=== Church ===
St Mary's Church dates from the 13th century built about 1240. The church's bell tower is detached about 60 feet (18 metres) from the main building of the church. The tower is supported at its base by four open arches. At each corner is a buttress which rises pinnacles with gabled niches in the first, second and third storey. The tower is topped with a carved parapet walls. The west doorway to the church is flanked on either side by buttresses, a result of remedial works carried out here after the foundations failed not long after the church was built. The south porch is arched with arcaded buttress on each side. The nave is arcaded with six bays on each side. The arches are supported on pillars which are encircled by detached shafts topped with capitals of stone carved foliage. The hammerbeam roof dates from the 15th century and is supported by 24 carved angels holding shields.

The bell tower, and the church, are both recorded in the National Heritage List for England as Grade I listed buildings. The bell tower is under the care of the Churches Conservation Trust. The tower is 77 feet high (23 metres) high to parapet, or 90 feet (27 metres) high when the pinnacles are included.

The church's rector was Edward Everard Blencowe (1806–1895) and in 1847 his sister Agnes Blencowe met the architect George Edmund Street here. Agnes was said to be the "best workwoman in England" and she and George Edmund Street's sister Mary Ann Street founded the Ladies’ Ecclesiastical Embroidery Society in 1854. The church still has a red and a green stole and a white frontal for the altar which were embroidered by Agnes Blencowe.

=== Windmills ===
Fen End Mill is two and a half miles (4.0 kilometres) south east of the village. Built in the 18th Century, it worked by wind until 1908. It was converted to residential use in the 1970s.

Ingleborough tower windmill is one mile (1.6 kilometres) north of the village, and is in the yard of Hill House Farm along with a house and assorted farm buildings. The mill is now in a state of disuse. It was designated as a Grade II listed building in 1951.

== Gallery ==
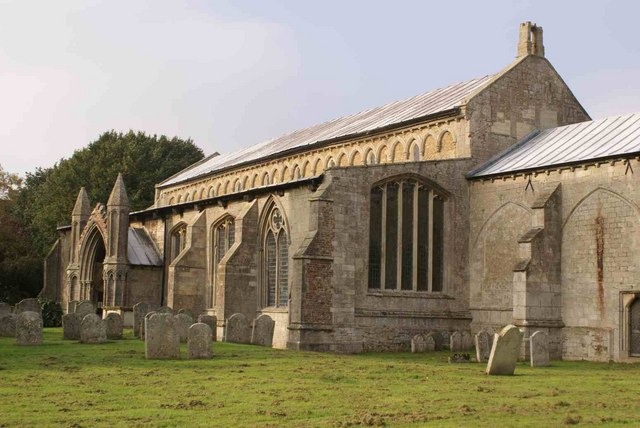
Saint Mary's parish church, West Walton

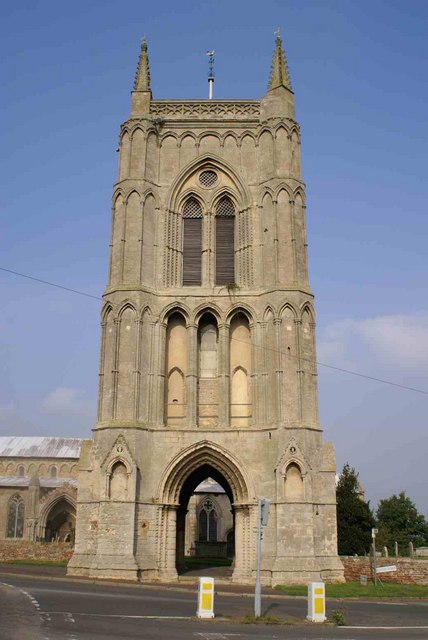
Saint Mary's Bell Tower

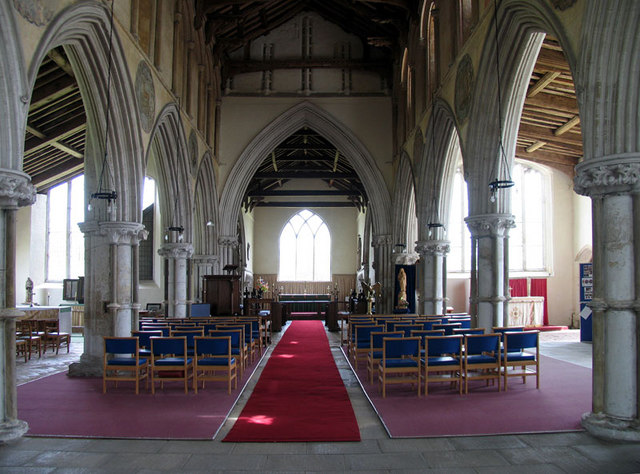
Inside St Mary's Church

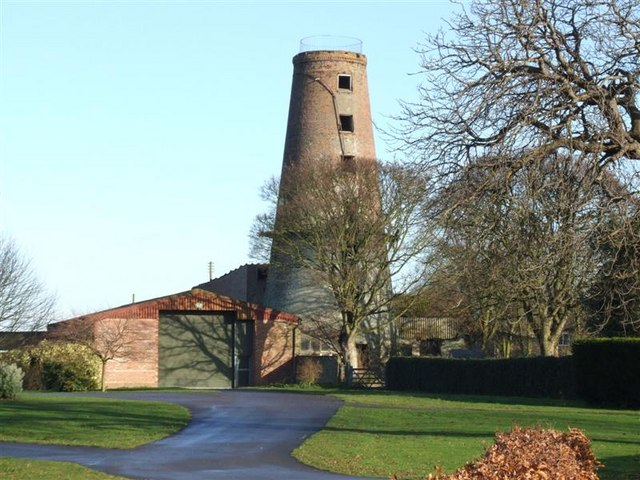
Ingleborough Tower Windmill
