= William John Butler =

English churchman

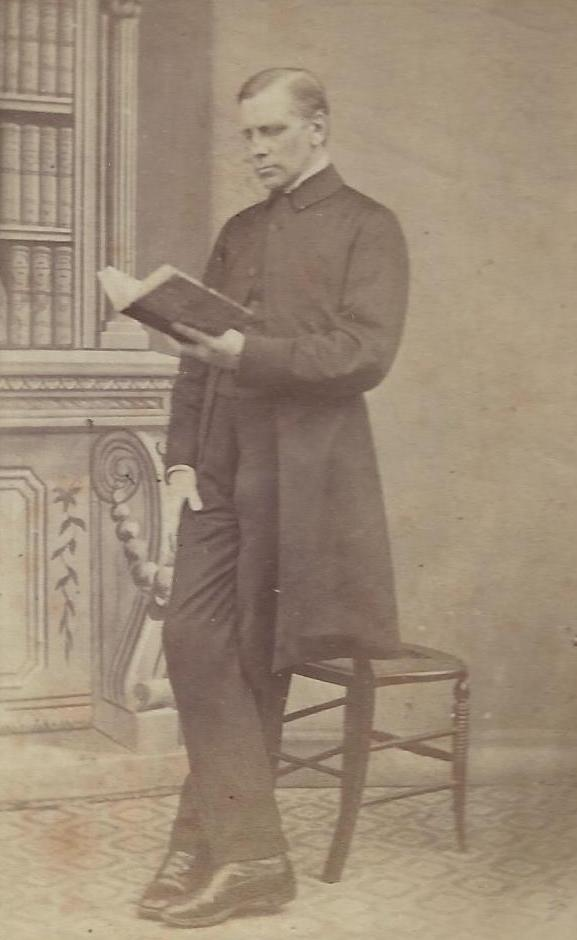

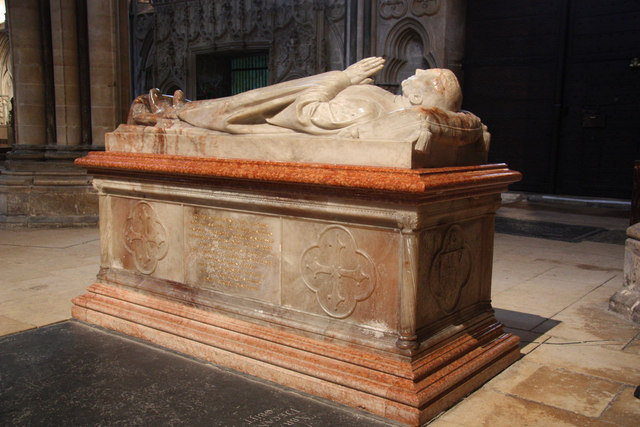
The monument of Dean Butler in Lincoln Cathedral

William John Butler (1818–1894) was an English churchman, Dean of Lincoln from 1885 until his death. He was previously Vicar of the Church of St Peter and St Paul, Wantage from 1847 to 1881, where he founded the Community of St Mary the Virgin.

== Life ==
He was eldest son of John La Forey Butler (1786-1848), a member of the firm of H. and I. Johnstone, merchants and bankers, born in Bryanston Street, Marylebone, London, on 10 February 1818. His mother, Henrietta, daughter of Captain Robert Patrick, was of Irish, as his father was of Pembrokeshire, descent. After schooling at Enfield, he became a queen's scholar at Westminster School in 1832, and entered Trinity College, Cambridge, in 1836. He won the Trinity essay in 1839, but, though a fair classical scholar, was unable to give sufficient time to the tripos, and took a pass degree in 1840. He commenced M.A. in 1844, and on 1 July 1847 was admitted ad eundem at Oxford, where he was made an honorary canon of Christ Church Cathedral in 1872.

He was ordained by Bishop Sumner in Farnham chapel in 1841 to the curacy of Dogmersfield, under Charles Dyson. Subsequently, for one year he held the curacy of Puttenham in Surrey, and in 1844, he accepted the perpetual curacy of Wareside, a poor outlying hamlet of Ware. Here he preached the discourses included in his Sermons for Working Men (1847). Meanwhile, in June 1846, he was appointed by the dean and chapter of Windsor to the vicarage of Church of St Peter and St Paul, Wantage. There he founded, and acted as warden of, the penitentiary sisterhood of St Mary's, in 1850, his name is inseparably associated. He retained the wardenship until his death.

While at Wantage he trained as his curates the Rev. A. H. Mackonochie, the Rev. G. Cosby White, the Rev. M. H. Noel, the Rev. V. S. S. Coles, Canon Newbolt and Dr Liddon. "I owe all the best I know to Butler" was a saying attributed to Liddon, but felt equally by many of the other churchmen who came under Butler's stimulating influence.

Upon the disputed deposition of John Colenso as Bishop of Natal in 1864, Butler was elected to replace him at a synod of the diocese of Natal; but the election was disapproved by Archbishop Longley, to whose views Butler loyally subordinated his own wishes. He was a great believer in obedience, and "a still greater in submission".

In 1874, he was elected to convocation as proctor for the clergy of Oxford, and often brightened the debates by the short speeches in which he excelled. In politics he was rather conservative. In 1880, however, he was nominated by Gladstone to a residentiary canonry at Worcester Cathedral, and while there did much good work in connection with the internal government of the cathedral, the establishment of a separate school for the choristers, and the formation of a girls' high school in the city. In 1885 Gladstone advanced him to the deanery of Lincoln in the room of Joseph Blakesley. To him the cathedral at Lincoln owes the evening service in the nave and numerous other improvements in the services.

His vigorous health suddenly broke in January 1894, and he died at the deanery on 14 January, and was buried on the 18th in the cloister garth of Lincoln Cathedral. A monument east of the choir stalls in Lincoln Cathedral was unveiled on 25 April 1896. The monument by Farmer & Brindley is of red Verona marble with an alabaster effigy carved by Léon-Joseph Chavalliaud. The south chapel of Wantage church was restored in 1895, "in thankful memory of W. J. Butler, 34 years vicar".

== Family ==
His death was followed on 21 January 1894 by that of his wife, Emma, daughter of George Henry Barnett (1780-1871), head of the banking firm of Barnett, Hoare, & Co., whom he had married at Putney on 29 July 1843, and by whom he had issue. She was buried beside her husband in the cloister garth at Lincoln.

Arthur John Butler (1844–1910), professor of Italian language and literature at University College, London, was the eldest of at least five children. His sisters were Grace Harriet (born 1847), Edith Emma (1851–1936), and Mary Avice (1855–1938), while his brother was William George (1849–1938).
