= Church of St Peter and St Paul, Wantage =

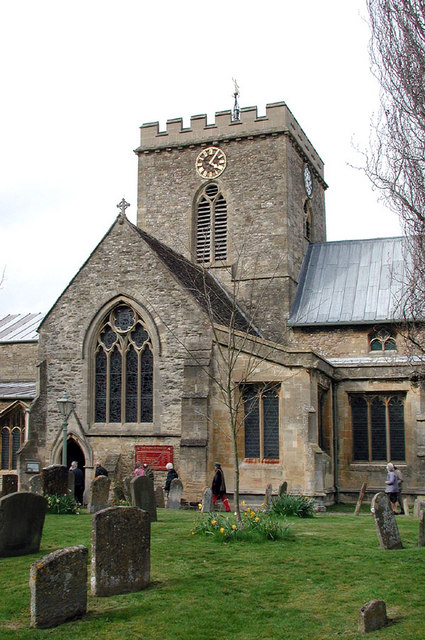
- Church of St Peter and St Paul, Wantage
- 51.5887°N 1.4285°W
- OS grid reference: SU 39690 87912
- Location: Church Street, Wantage, Oxfordshire, OX12 8AQ
- Country: England
- Denomination: Church of England
- Churchmanship: Anglo-Catholic

History
- Status: Active

Architecture
- Functional status: Parish church
- Heritage designation: Grade I listed
- Designated: 22 April 1950

Administration
- Diocese: Diocese of Oxford
- Archdeaconry: Archdeaconry of Dorchester
- Deanery: Wantage
- Parish: Wantage

Clergy
- Vicar: The Revd Katherine Magdalene Price

The Church of St Peter and St Paul is a Church of England parish church in Wantage, Oxfordshire. The church is a grade-I listed building.

== History ==
The earliest parts of the church date to the late 13th century. In the 15th century, the chancel was extended, and chapels and aisles were added.

The Dean and Canons of St George's Chapel, Windsor Castle, are patrons of Wantage dating back to 03 December 1421.

In 1857, during the Victorian restoration, the church was restored by George Edmund Street. In 1877, the church was extended to the west by William Butterfield with an addition of one bay. The south chapel was restored in 1895, "in thankful memory of W. J. Butler, 34 years vicar".

On 22 April 1950, the church was designated a Grade I listed building.

=== Present day ===
The Church of England parish of Wantage is in the Archdeaconry of Dorchester of the Diocese of Oxford. The parish stands in the Catholic tradition of the Church of England.

== Notable clergy ==
- William John Butler, later Dean of Lincoln, was vicar from 1847 to 1881
- Edward Foyle Nelson, 4th son of Thomas Nelson, 2nd Earl Nelson, Curate to William John Butler from 1857 to his death in 1859 of Typhoid Fever. A stained glass window dedicated to Edward was installed in 1861.
- Roscow Shedden, former Bishop of Nassau, was vicar from 1931 to 1952
- Robert Wright, later Chaplain to the Speaker of the House of Commons, was priest-in-charge (1978–1984) and vicar (1987–1992)

== Gallery ==
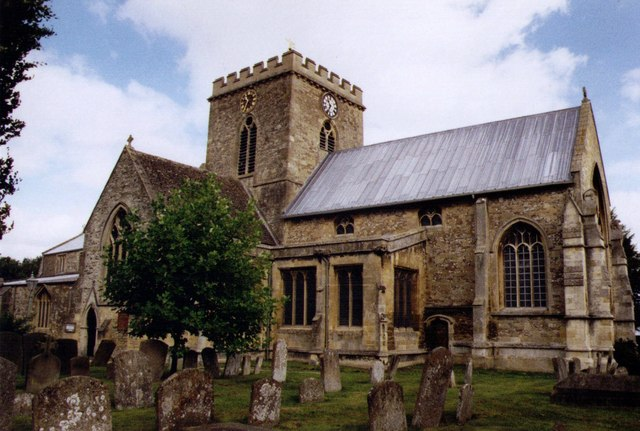

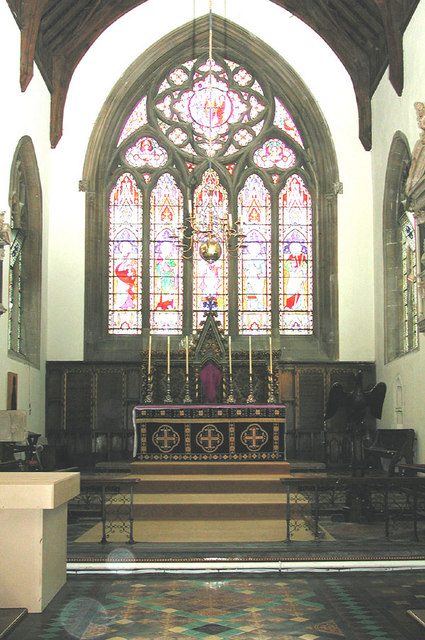
Chancel

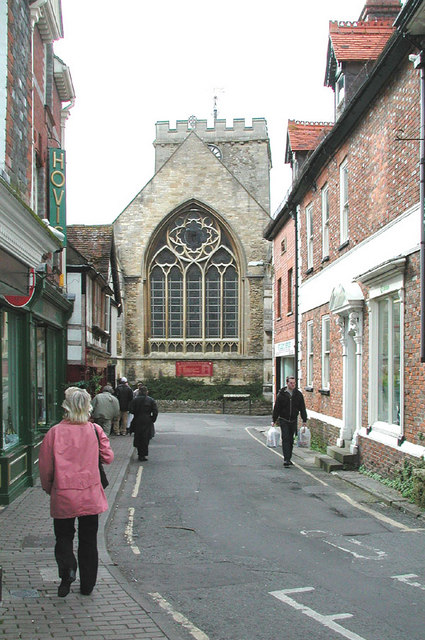
View from the street of the East window
