= Judith Wilcox, Baroness Wilcox =

British businesswoman and life peer

The Right Honourable The Baroness Wilcox
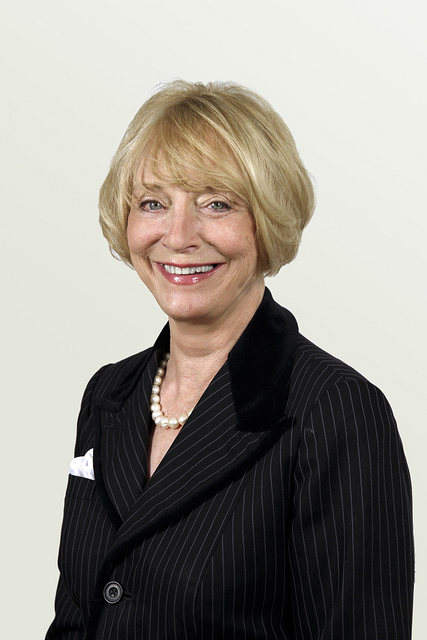

Parliamentary Under-Secretary of State for Intellectual Property
- In office 11 May 2010 – 4 September 2012
- Prime Minister: David Cameron
- Preceded by: David Lammy
- Succeeded by: The Lord Marland

Member of the House of Lords
- Lord Temporal
- Life peerage 16 January 1996 – 17 December 2020

Personal details
- Born: Judith Ann Freeman; 31 October 1939 (age 86) Plymouth, Devon, England
- Spouses: Keith Davenport (m. 1961; div. 1979) Sir Malcolm Wilcox (m. 1986; died 1986)
- Children: 1
- Parent(s): John Freeman; Elsie Finch
- Education: University of Plymouth (BA)

Judith Ann Wilcox, Baroness Wilcox (née Freeman; born 31 October 1939) is a businesswoman and a life peer. She was awarded her peerage in 1996 as one of the first Working Peers for her services to Consumer Services. She sat in the House of Lords as a Conservative until her retirement in 2020.

She was appointed Under-Secretary of State for Business Innovation and Skills (Intellectual Property) from 2010 to 2012. She has been a member of the European Union Select Committee since 2015, working closely with Government departments planning the United Kingdom's departure from the European Union.

== Early life ==
Judith Ann Freeman was born on 31 October 1939 in Plymouth, Devon, the eldest child and only daughter of John and Elsie (née Finch) Freeman. She was educated at St Dunstan's Abbey School, Plymouth and St Mary's School, Wantage. She graduated from Plymouth University with a Business Studies degree (Bachelor of Arts).

== Career ==
After spending some time in France, Wilcox managed her parents' retail business. She built and ran a family food business in Devon and Cornwall, diversifying into the fishing industry with her company, Capstan Foods Ltd, which was bought by Birdseye. She then established Channel Foods Ltd in Cornwall, supplying fish to supermarkets and other major retail chains. In 1989 this was sold to French company, Pêcheries de la Morinie, of which she was president from 1989 to 1991.

In 1990, Wilcox became chairman of the UK National Consumer Council, an independent organisation working on behalf of consumers.

== Political career ==
Lady Wilcox was Under-Secretary of State for Business innovation and Skills (Intellectual Property) from 2010 to 2012. She was a UK delegate to the Council of Europe from 2012 to 2015. From 2015 to 2018 she was a member of the European Union Select Committee, which worked closely with Government departments planning the United Kingdom's departure for the European Union as well as a member of European Sub-Committee on Energy and Environment from 2015 to 2019.

She retired from the House of Lords on 17 December 2020.

=== Non-executive roles ===
Lady Wilcox has been a non-executive Director of the Automobile Association, Inland Revenue, Port of London Authority, Carpetright PLC, Johnson Services PLC, council member of the Royal National Mission to Deep Sea Fishermen (the Fishermen's Mission) and the Harris Academy. She is currently a governor of the Harris Westminster Sixth Form School, Westminster.

=== Outside interests ===
Lady Wilcox is Vice-President of the Girl Guides Association, a Fellow of the Royal Society of Arts and until 2017 was Chairman of Trustees for the Community of St Mary the Virgin. In 2002, she was on the Commission advising on the appointment of the Archbishop of Canterbury. Her hobbies include sailing, bird watching, enjoying cinema and theatre, as well as spending time with her grandchildren.

== Personal life ==
Lady Wilcox was first married in 1961 in Plymouth to Keith Davenport, with whom she had her only child, Simon (born 1963). She divorced Davenport in 1979. Seven years later, in 1986, she was married to Sir Malcolm Wilcox (1921–1986), the then-chief of Midland Bank. He died of cancer three months after their wedding. Wilcox has four grandchildren.

== Honours and arms ==
Upon her marriage to Sir Malcolm Wilcox, she became Judith, Lady Wilcox, as is customary for wives of Knights Commander of the British Empire (KBE). She retained use of this title until 16 January 1996, when she was made a life peer. Upon this, she acquired the title of Baroness Wilcox, of Plymouth in the County of Devon and the style of Right Honourable, in her own right.

Coat of arms of Judith Wilcox, Baroness Wilcox
Escutcheon Azure a cross Argent between four tressures Or each enclosing a fleur-de-lis surmounting and conjoined to a pentagon voided the two upper sides enarched Argent. Supporters On either side a lobster Azure crowned Or. Motto Simplici Myrto
