= Christ Church, Welshpool =

Coordinates: 52.659554°N 3.152823°W

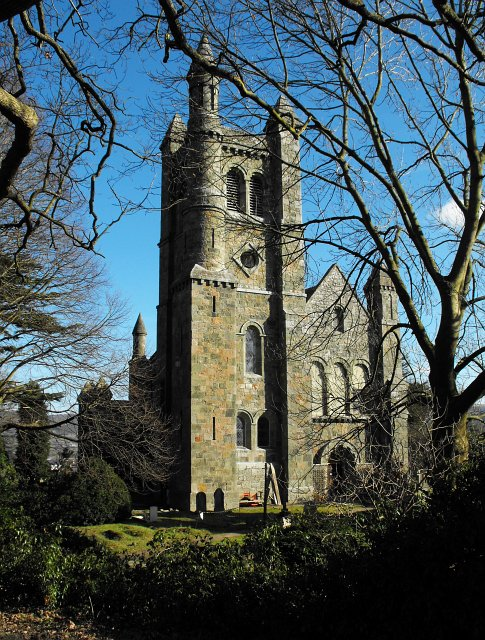
- Christ Church, Welshpool

- Location within Powys
- Location: Welshpool, Powys
- Country: Wales
- Denomination: Church in Wales

History
- Dedication: Christ

Architecture
- Functional status: Closed
- Heritage designation: Grade II*
- Designated: 25 April 1950
- Architect: Thomas Penson
- Architectural type: Church
- Style: Romanesque Revival
- Groundbreaking: 1839
- Completed: 1844
- Construction cost: £6,000
- Closed: 1998

Specifications
- Materials: Welshpool granite

Administration
- Province: Wales
- Diocese: St Asaph
- Archdeaconry: Montgomery
- Parish: Welshpool St Mary

Christ Church, Welshpool was commissioned by the Earl of Powis to commemorate his son, Edward James, the Viscount Clive, having come of age. It was designed by Thomas Penson and completed 1839–44. The church is characterised by its impressive Romanesque Revival architecture in volcanic Trachyte from the Earl of Powis' Standard quarry in Welshpool. The church consists of a 7-bay nave with offset west tower, aisles, apse and south porch. The west gable of the nave has a wide doorway with triple arches with chevron moulding, while the tower is supported by massive pilaster buttresses. Christ Church was most noted for its interior decoration, and in particular its early use of terracotta. The church was a Chapel of Ease of Welshpool's St Mary's Church and had a separate endowment. It cost £6000 to build and this was raised by public subscription as well as being supported by the Earl. The congregation of Christ Church dropped dramatically during the twentieth century and in 1998 it was closed and sold in 2002 to Karl Meredith and Natalie Bass who are in the process of restoring the church, partly as a house and partly for community use.

== Architecture ==
A large Anglo-Norman style church by Thomas Penson, 1839–44, and just earlier than his St Agatha, Llanymynech in Shropshire. Nave, North and South aisles, apse, South porch, North-West tower. Exterior very roughly detailed, with huge conical turrets and massive buttressing. Interior of a grand Romanesque kind, with columns with scalloped capitals, a clerestory, si and a flat ceiling.

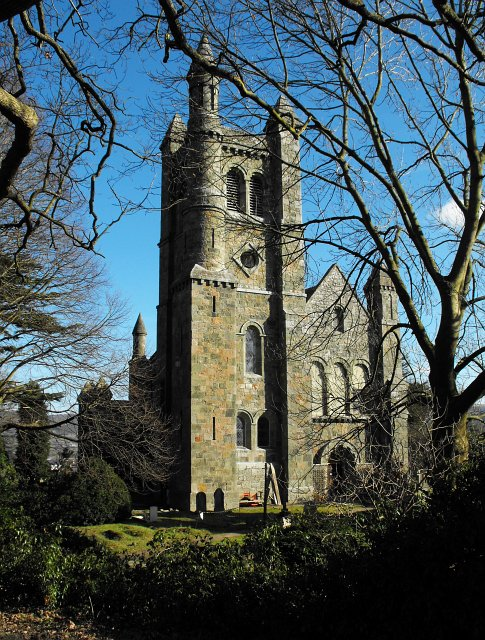
Christ Church, Welshpool

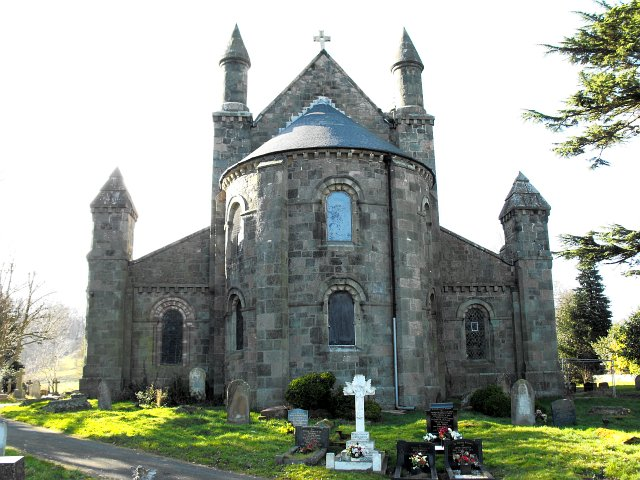
Christ Church, Welshpool

=== Terracotta Work ===
In this church moulded yellow bricks and terracotta were used for the Romanesque arches of the nave and for the apsidal vaulting of the ceiling. It is likely that Penson, whose offices were at Oswestry was using the experimental terracotta that was being produced at the brickyards connected with the Oswestry Coalfield between Trefonen and Morda. Penson also used terracotta for Llanymynech church, St David's Church Newtown and the porch at Llangedwyn

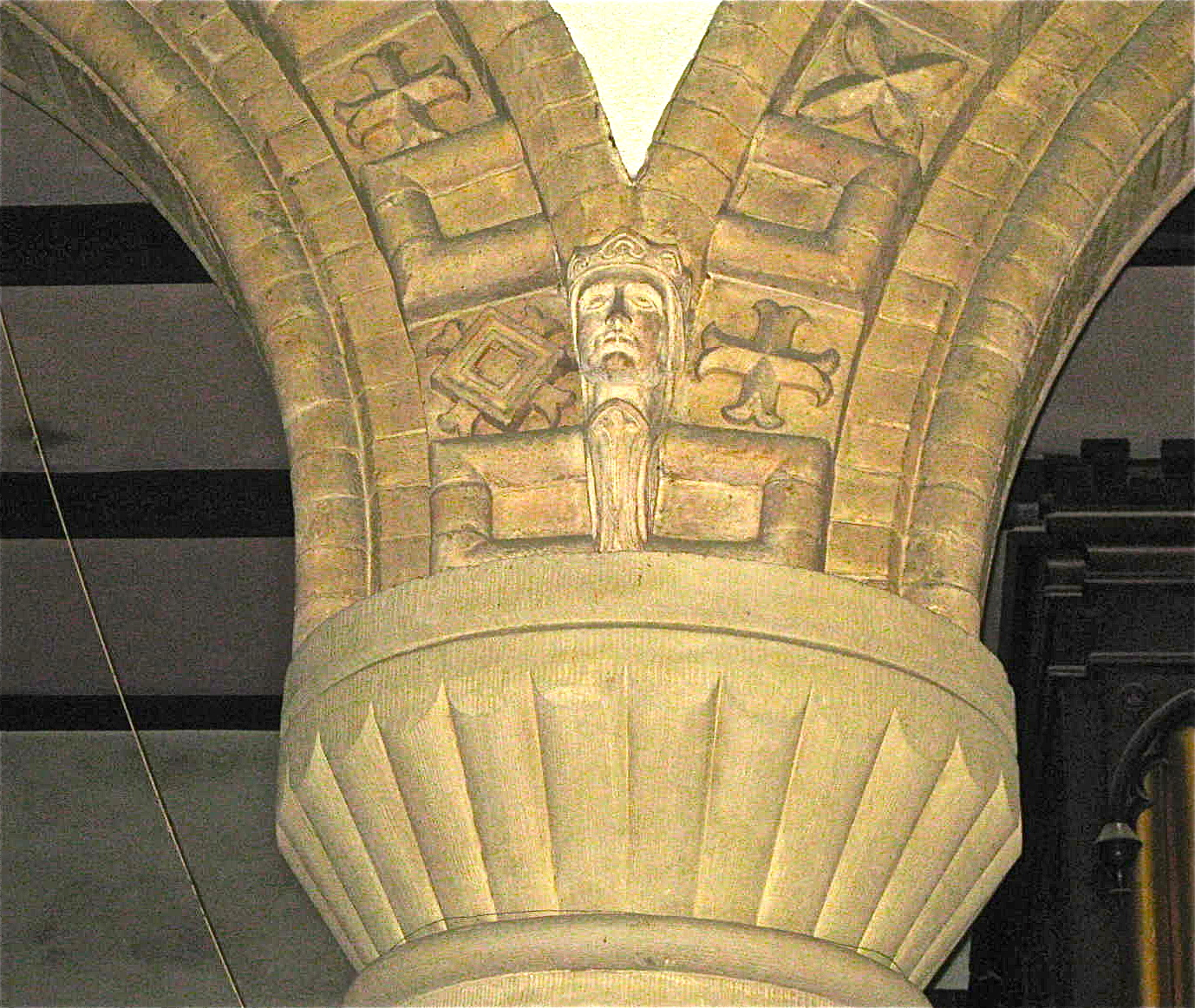
Christ Church, Welshpool. Terracotta detailing on thearch above the limestone Romanesque revival column capital

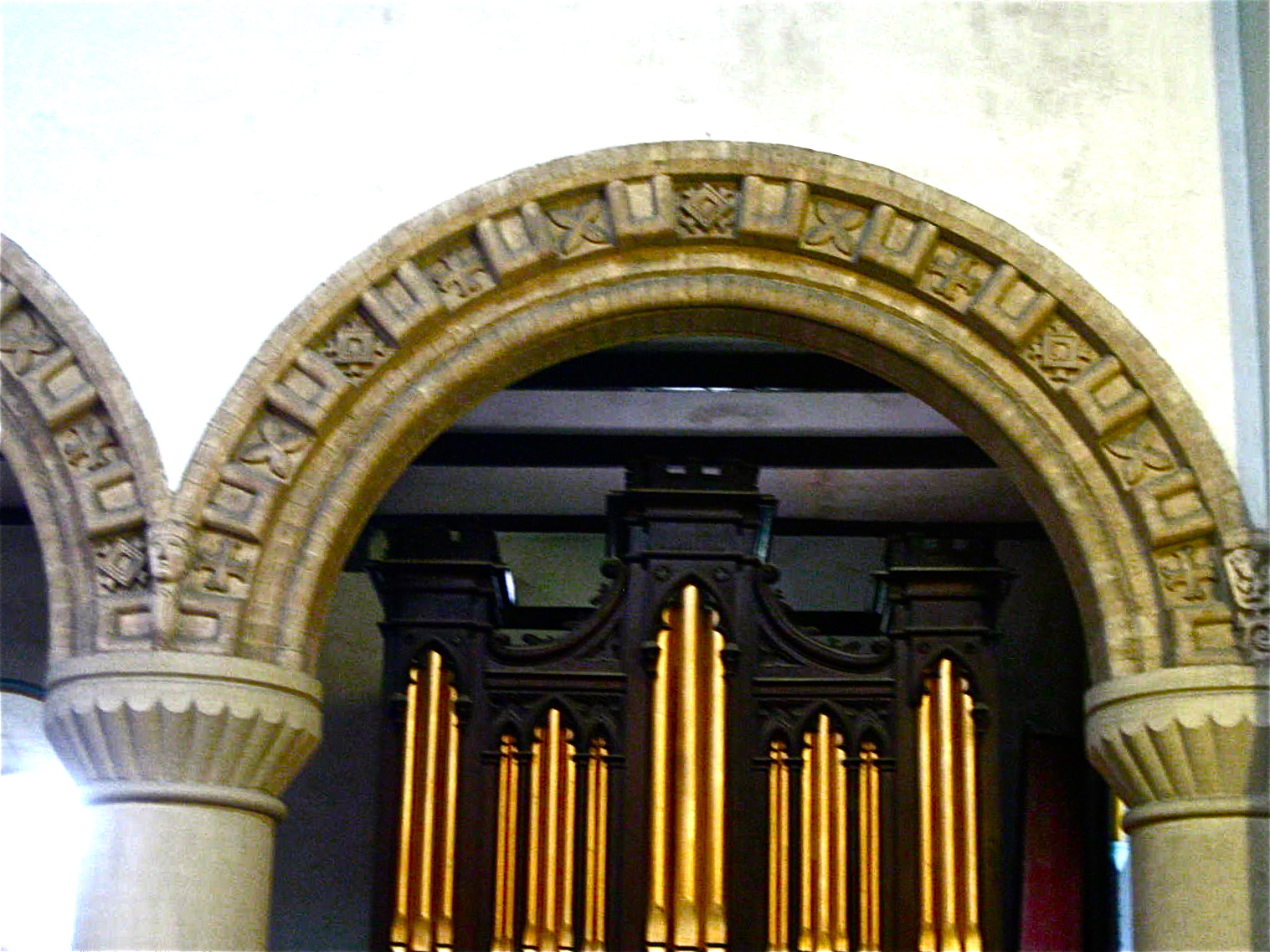
Christ Church, Welshpool. Terracotta Romanesque revival arch

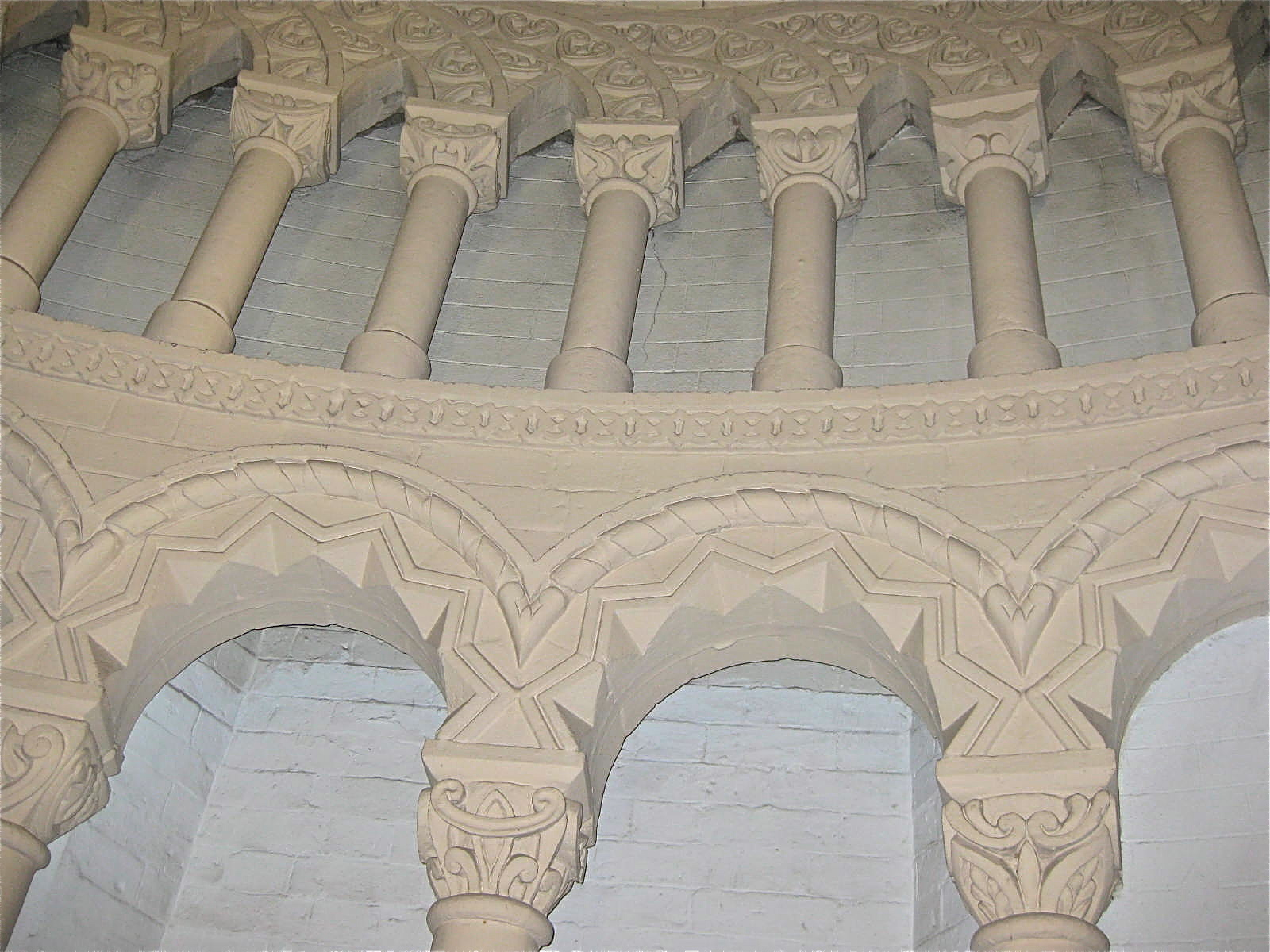
Christ Church, Welshpool. Chancel arcade in apse behind altar

== Church Furnishings ==
=== Font ===
The font is very finely cast in terracotta and is reminiscent of Coade stone. A similar, but later cast stone font is at Leighton Church, near Welshpool.

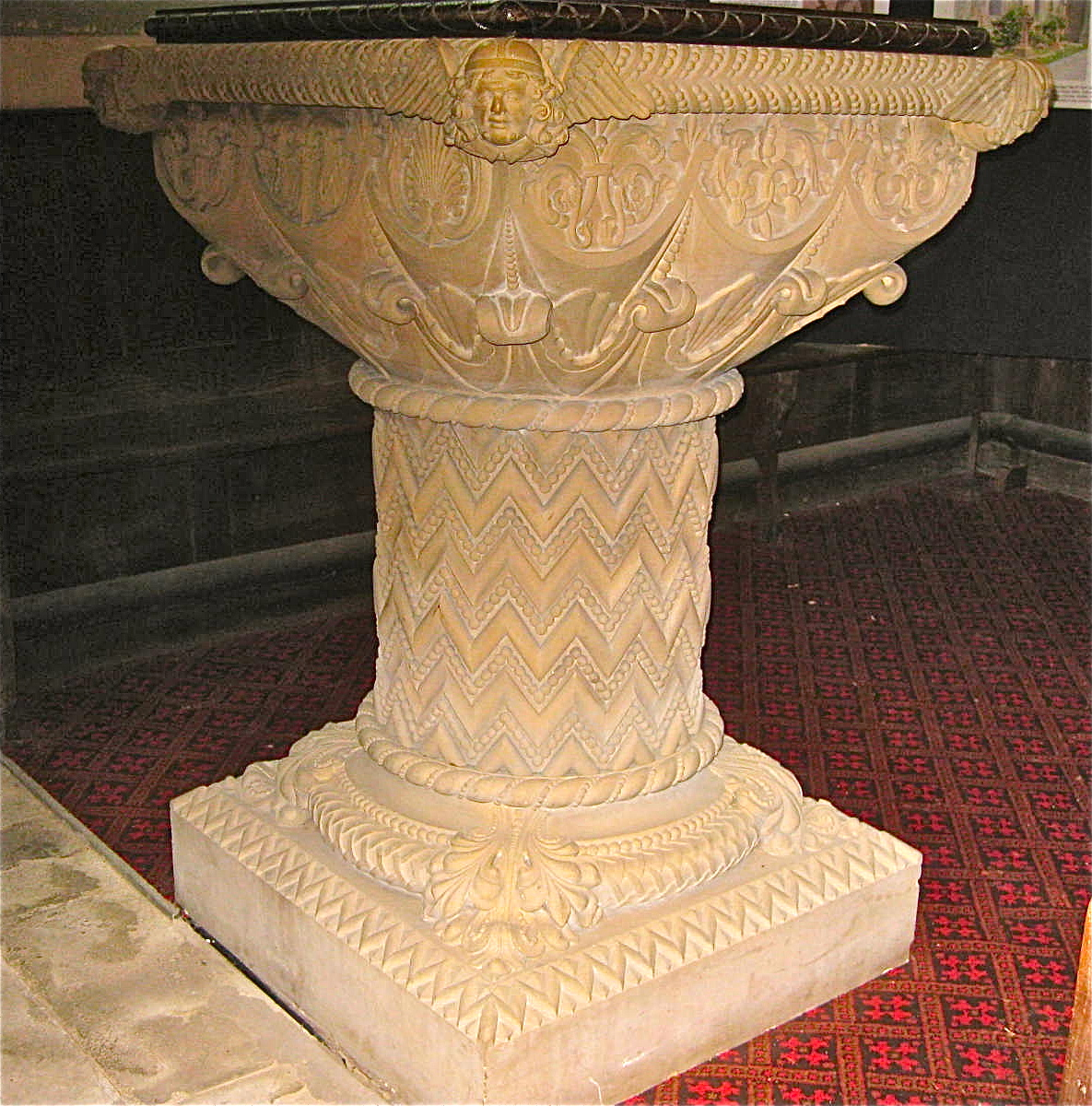
Christ Church, Welshpool. Font of terracotta.c.1844

=== Woodwork ===
The carved woodwork of the pews is impressive and particularly the armorial finials of the Earl of Powis’ family pews. These are finer than the similar pew ends in Leighton church.

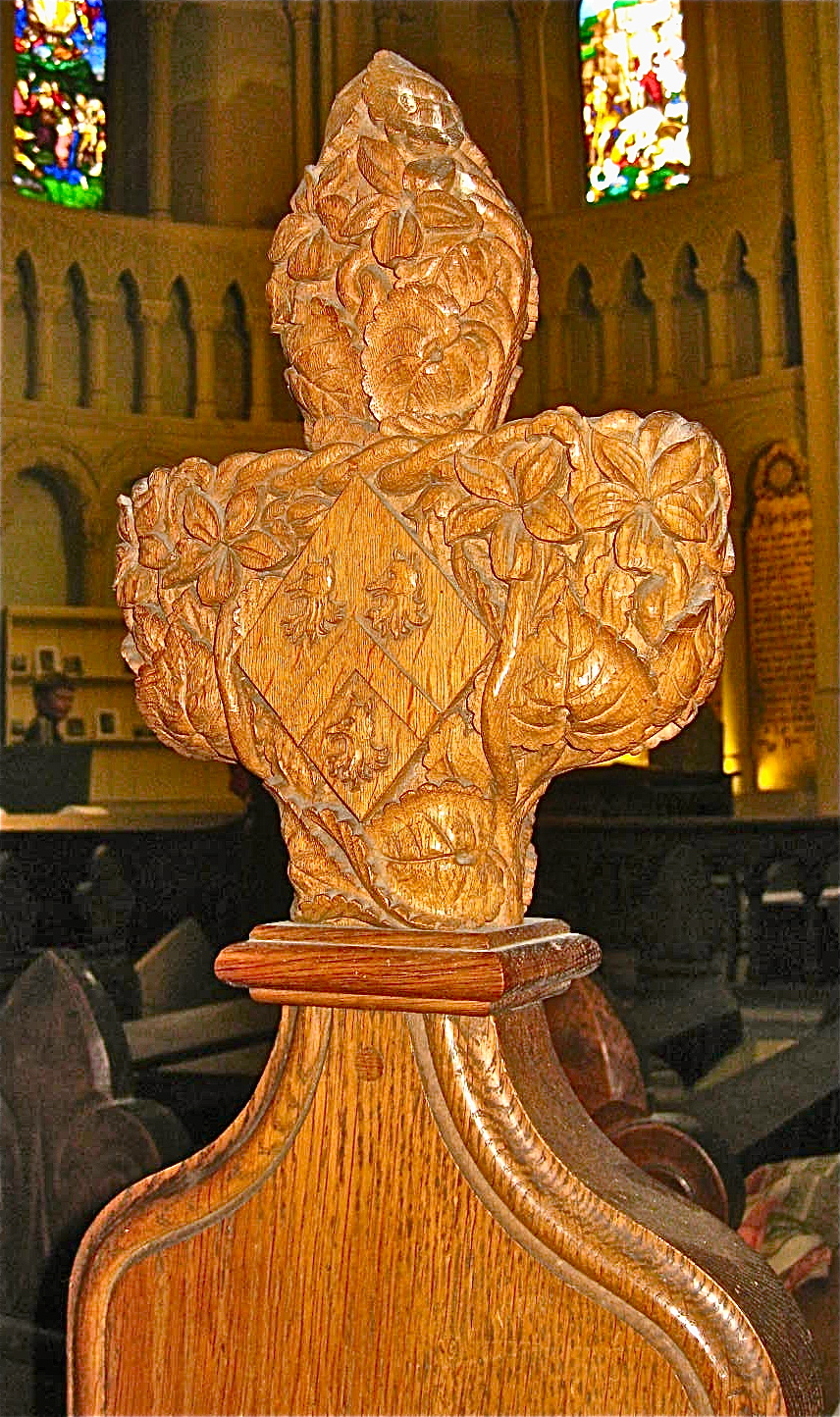
Christ Church, Welshpool

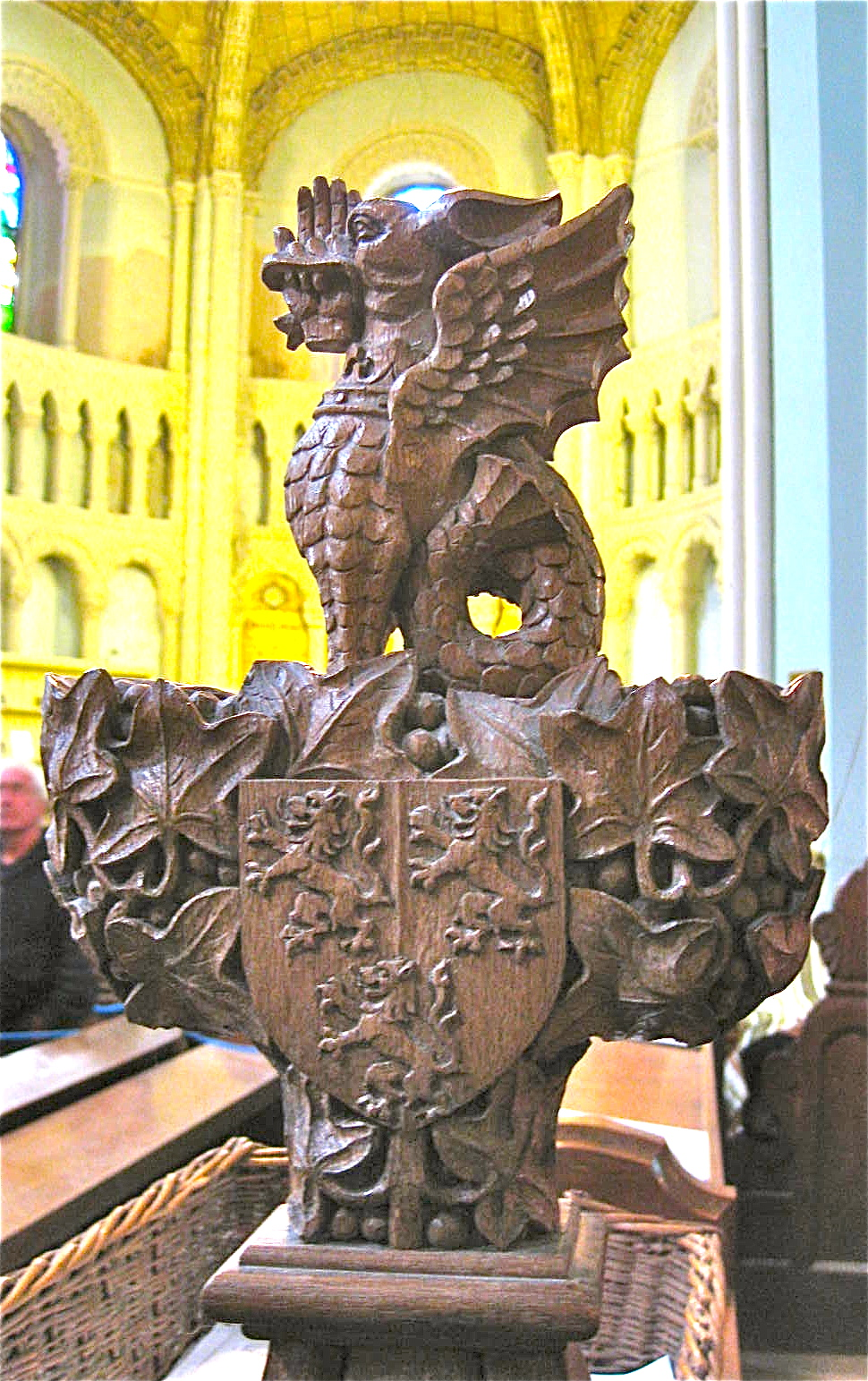
Christ Church, Welshpool. Carved Pew end with Powis arms and crest

=== Organ ===
The church has an important organ by Gray of 1817.

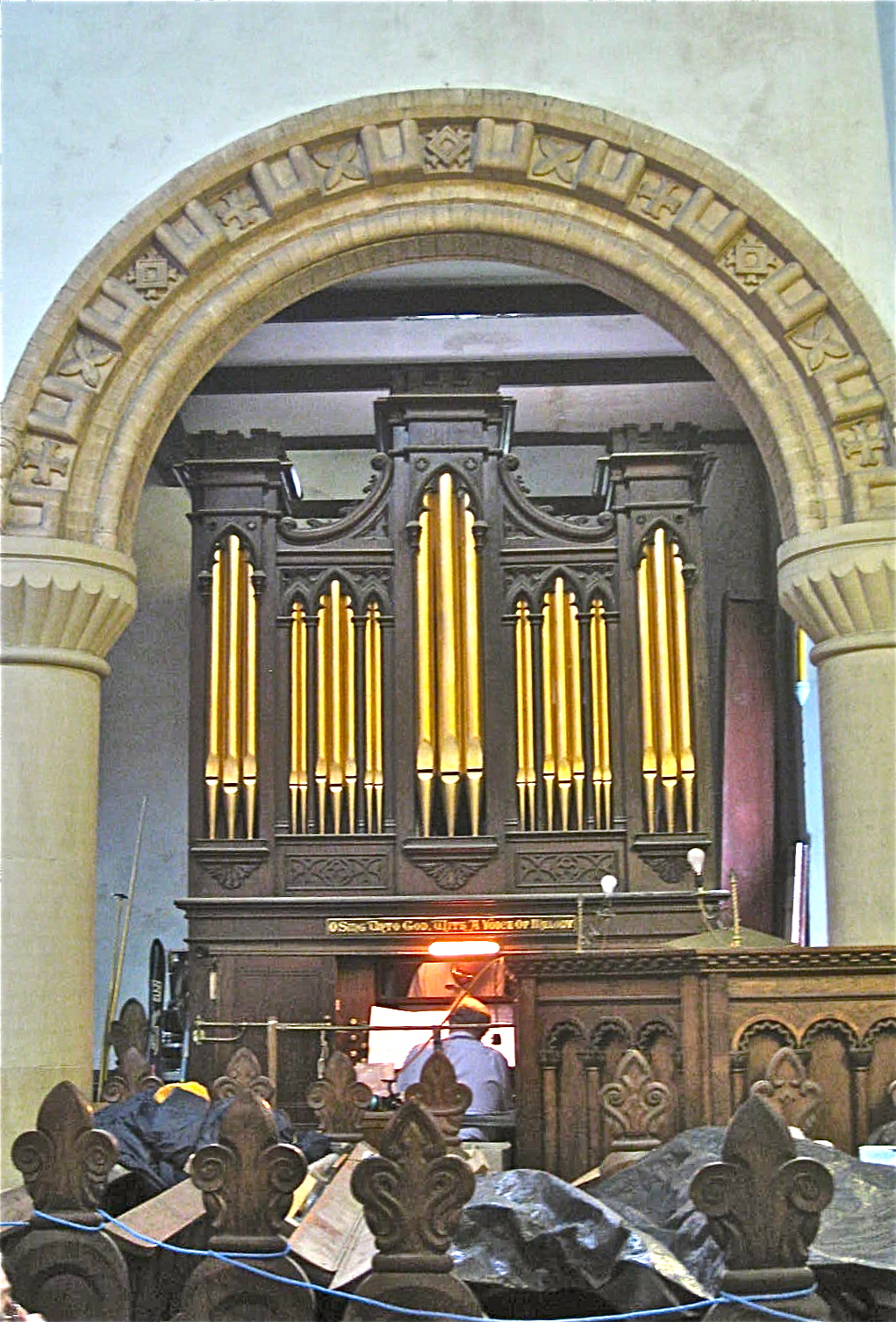
Christ Church, Welshpool. Terracotta arch with organ by Gray of 1815

=== Encaustic Tiles ===
The church has some fine decorative encaustic floor tiles. Some of these were manufactured by Minton, but the source of armorial tiles with the Royal Coats of Arms, the Earls of Powis and the Bishops of St Asaph have not been identified.

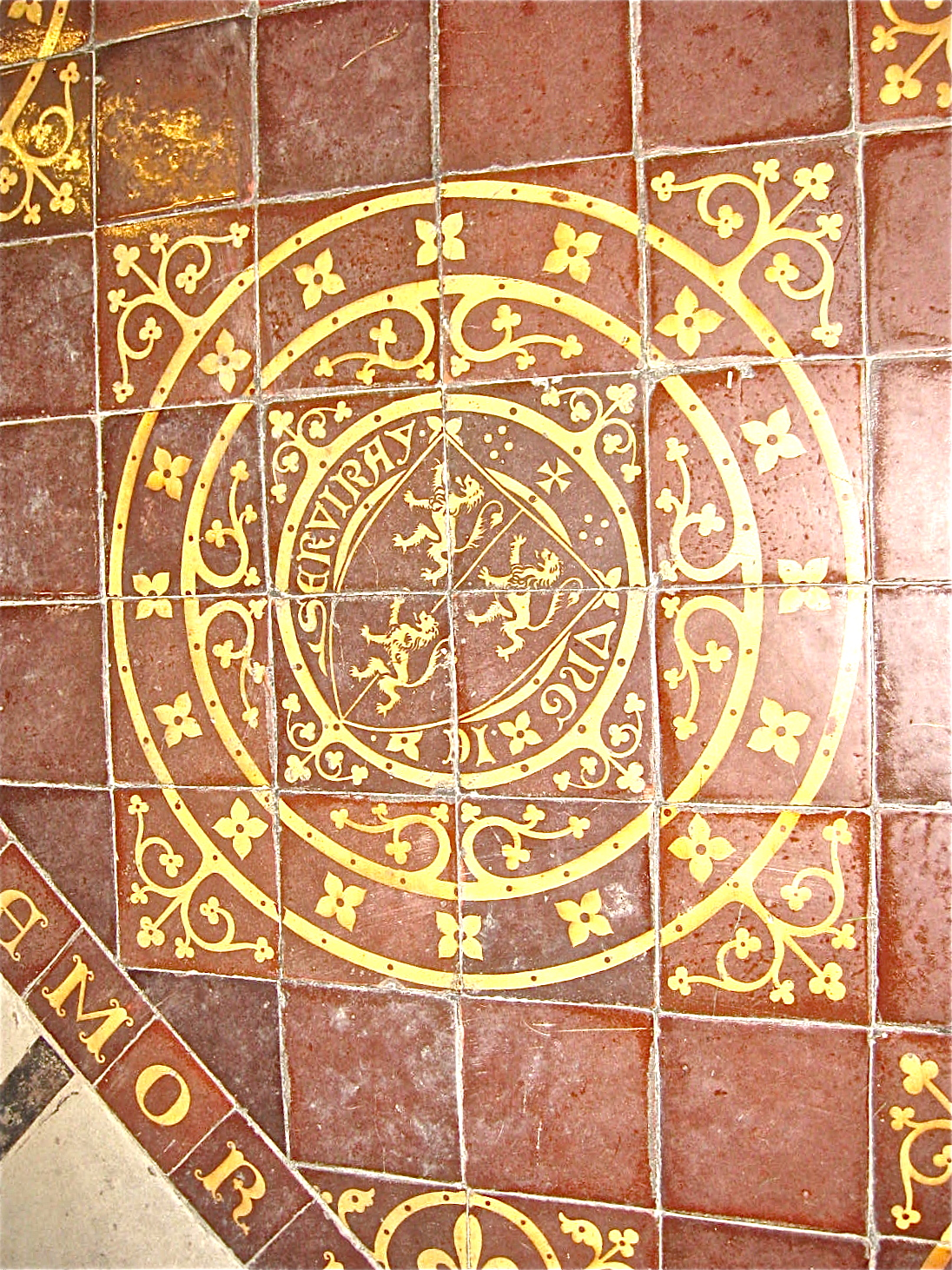
Christ Church, Welshpool. Chancel floor tiles

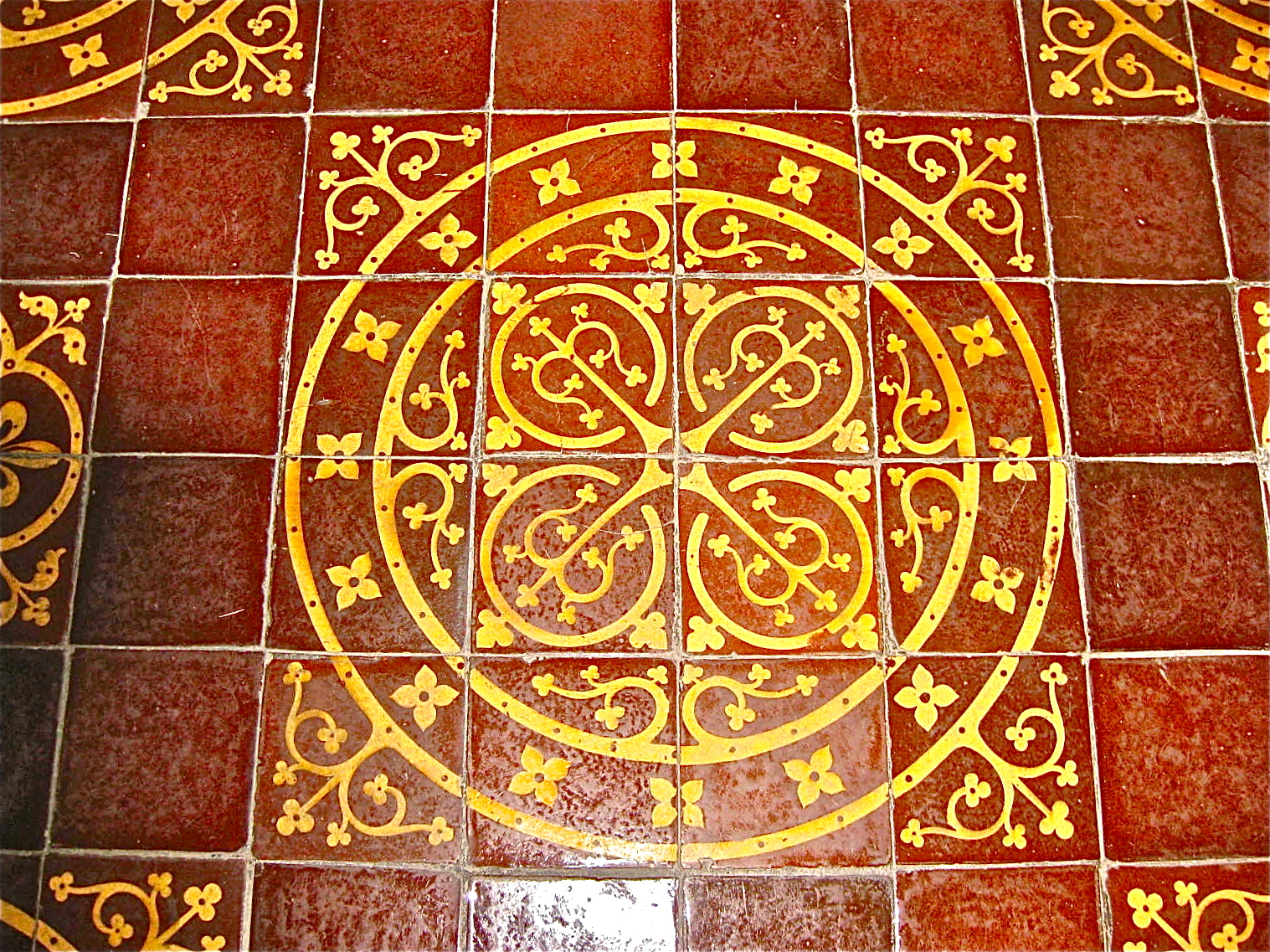
Christ Church, Welshpool.

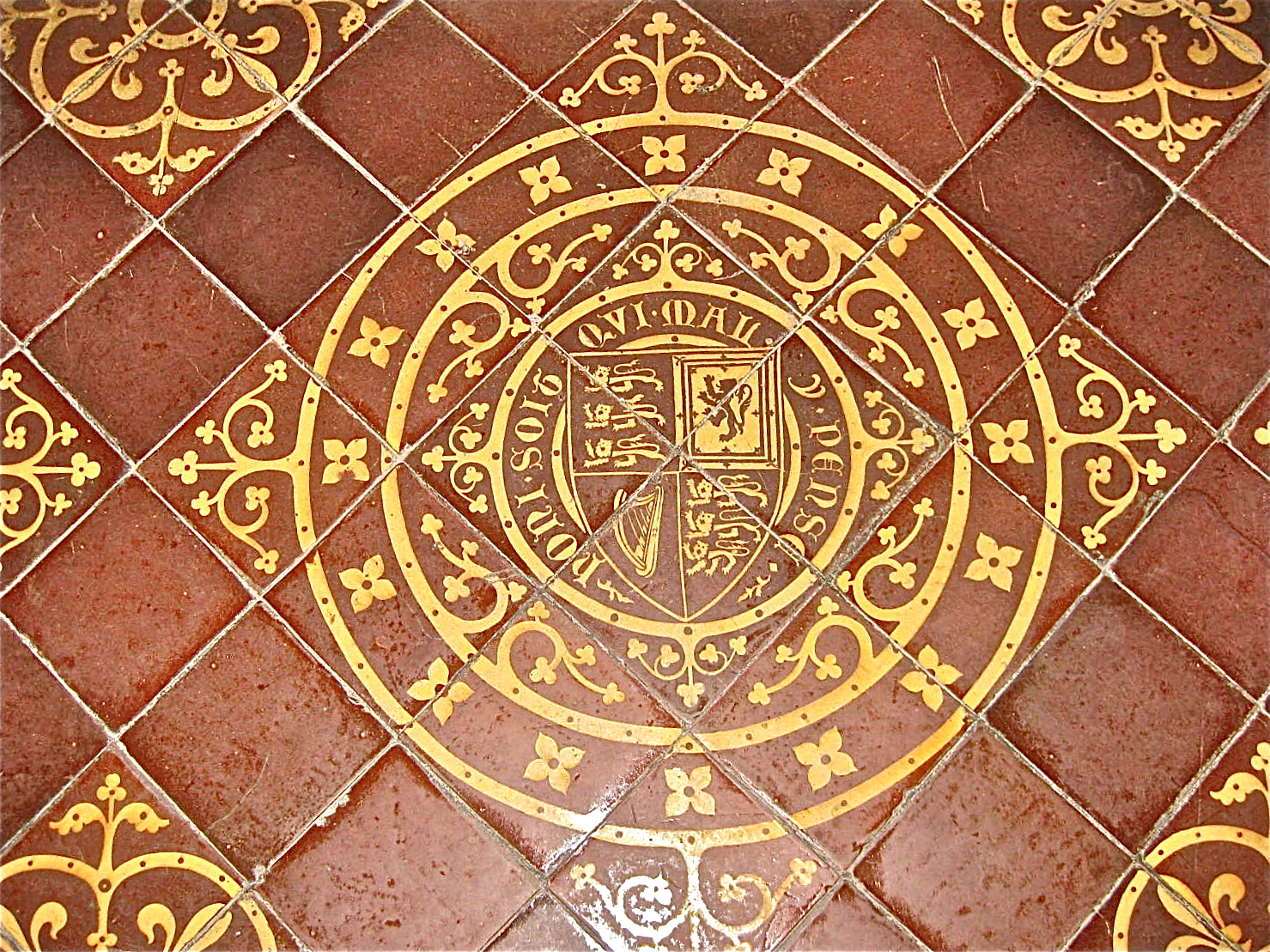
Christ Church, Welshpool. Royal Coat of Arms

=== Stained Glass ===
Three apse windows probably by David Evans of 1844, Three windows by A O Hemming of 1892

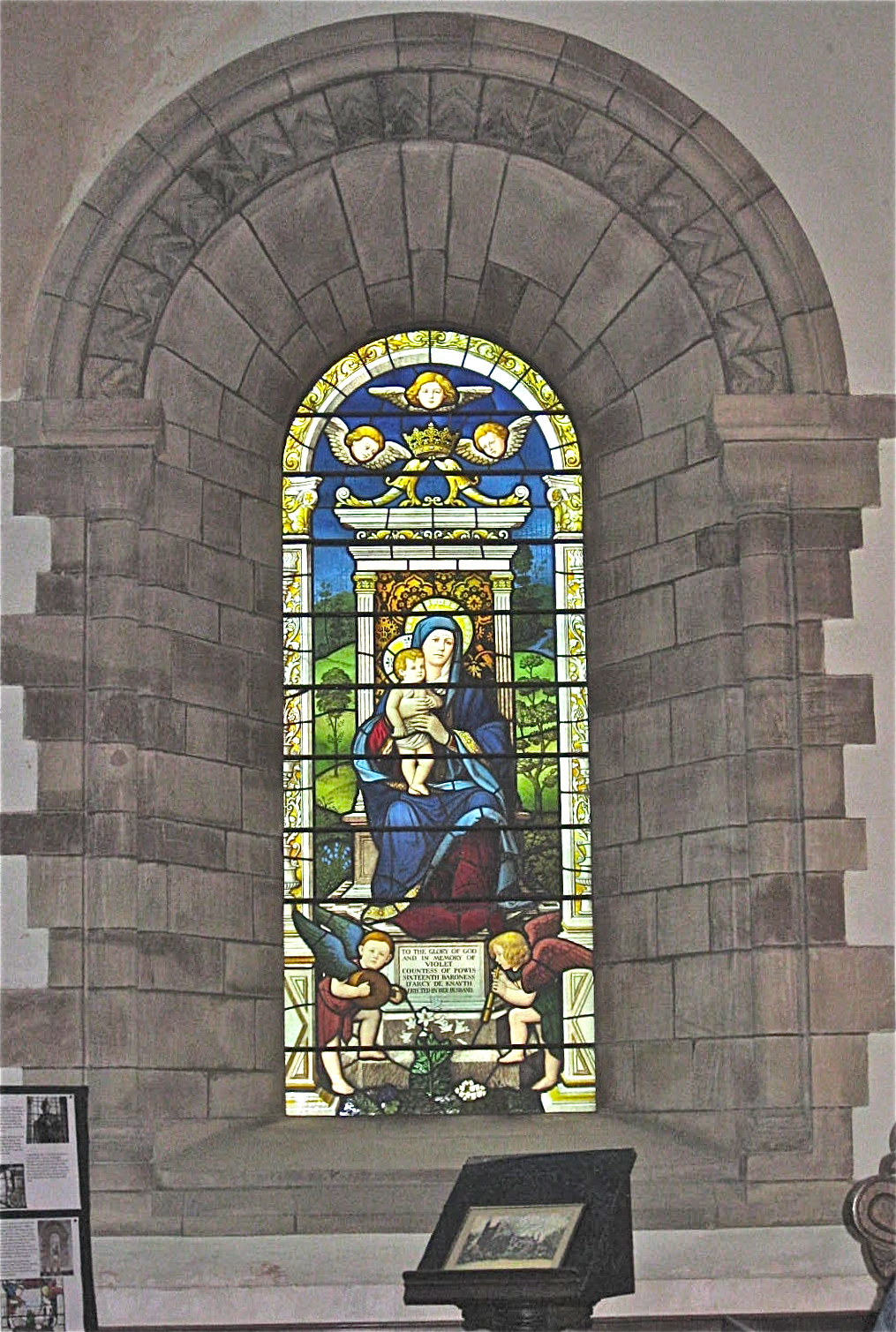
Christ Church, Welshpool.

== Churchyard ==
Those buried here include judge William Henry Watson, and members of the family of the Earls of Powis. The Commonwealth War Graves Commission register and maintain the graves of 12 British service personnel, comprising one officer and four soldiers of the army from World War I, and three army soldiers and one officer and one airman of the Royal Air Force of World War II; these include two brothers, Viscounts Clive, who were sons of the 4th Earl of Powis.

== Literature ==
- Thomas, D. R. The History of the Diocese of St Asaph, Caxton Press, Oswestry 1908 (2nd ed.), Vol 3, 181–3
- R. Scourfield and R. Haslam The Buildings of Wales: Powys – Montgomeryshire, Radnorshire and Breconshire Yale University Press 2013.
- Stratton, M. (1993) The Terracotta Revival: Building Innovation and the Image of the Industrial City in Britain and North America. London : Gollancz.
