= Davina Ingrams, 18th Baroness Darcy de Knayth =

British paralympic competitor

The Right Honourable The Baroness Darcy de Knayth DBE

Member of the House of Lords
- Lord Temporal
- Hereditary peerage 9 June 1969 – 11 November 1999
- Preceded by: The Viscount Clive
- Succeeded by: Seat abolished
- Elected Hereditary Peer; 11 November 1999 – 24 February 2008
- Election: 1999
- Preceded by: Seat established
- Succeeded by: The 14th Earl of Stair

Personal details
- Born: Davina Marcia Herbert; 10 July 1938 UK
- Died: 24 February 2008 (aged 69) UK
- Spouse: Rupert Ingrams (m. 1960; died 1964)
- Relations: George Herbert, 4th Earl of Powis (grandfather)
- Children: 3
- Parent(s): Mervyn Herbert, Viscount Clive; Vida Cuthbert
- Education: St Mary's School, Wantage; Sorbonne

Davina Marcia Herbert Ingrams, 18th Baroness Darcy de Knayth, DBE (10 July 1938 – 24 February 2008) was a crossbench member of the House of Lords, continuing to sit after the passing of the House of Lords Act 1999 as an elected peer.

== Biography ==
Medal record

Representing Great Britain

Paralympic Games

Women's swimming
Gold medal – first place	1968 Tel Aviv	25 m backstroke class 1 incomplete

Table tennis
Bronze medal – third place	1972 Heidelberg	Teams 2

Ingrams was the daughter of Mervyn Herbert, 17th Baron Darcy de Knayth (also known as Viscount Clive, his courtesy title as son of the Earl of Powis); and his wife Vida, née Cuthbert. The barony had been created in 1332 for John Darcy, and revived twice after falling into abeyance. Through her grandfather, George Herbert, 4th Earl of Powis, she was descended from Robert Clive, 1st Baron Clive. She inherited the barony in 1943, when her father was killed in action during the Second World War, flying a Mosquito as a squadron leader in the RAF.

In 1946, the widowed Lady Clive remarried, to Brigadier Derek Schreiber, Chief of Staff to the Governor General of Australia: Lady Darcy de Knayth acted as flower girl.

Lady Darcy de Knayth was educated at St Mary's School, Wantage, and later in Florence and the Sorbonne.

== Career ==
She and her husband were involved in a serious accident in 1964, returning from a dance, when their car hit a tree. Her husband was killed outright, and she was paralysed from the neck down. She was treated at Stoke Mandeville Hospital, and later recovered some movement in her upper body. She became a wheelchair user and took up table tennis and archery. She won a gold medal in swimming at the 1968 Summer Paralympics in Israel, and a bronze for table tennis at the 1972 Games in West Germany.

She was one of the first 16 hereditary peeresses admitted to the House of Lords in 1963, and spoke frequently on disability matters after taking up her seat in 1969. She was appointed a Dame Commander of the Order of the British Empire (DBE) in the 1996 New Year Honours for political and public service.

After the House of Lords Act 1999 removed most of the hereditary peers from the House of Lords, she was selected as one of the select representative peers, coming top of the ballot of crossbench peers.

== Personal life ==
She married publisher Rupert Ingrams (brother of the Private Eye editor Richard Ingrams) in 1960. They had three children.

She died on 24 February 2008, aged 69, of undisclosed causes. She was survived by her son and two daughters. Her son, Caspar, succeeded as the 19th Baron Darcy de Knayth. The day after Lady Darcy's death, the House of Lords paid her warm tribute when it passed the third reading of the Disabled Persons (Independent Living) Bill.

Peerage of England
Preceded by Mervyn Herbert	Baroness Darcy de Knayth; 1943–2008; Member of the House of Lords (1969–1999)	Succeeded by Caspar Ingrams
Parliament of the United Kingdom
New office created by the House of Lords Act 1999	Elected hereditary peer to the House of Lords under the House of Lords Act 1999; 1999–2008	Succeeded by The Earl of Stair
