= Yasmin Le Bon =

English model (born 1964)

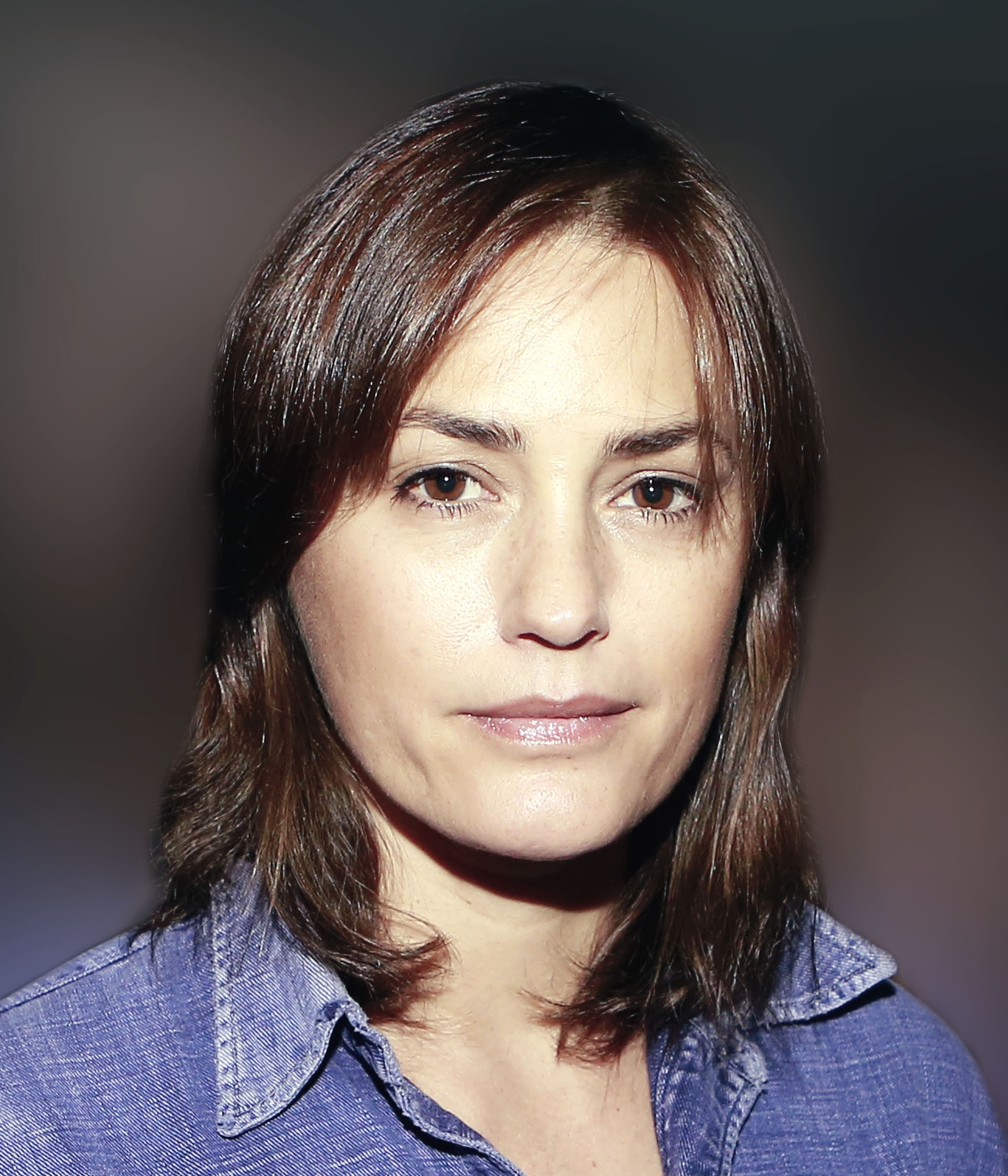
- Le Bon in 2015
- Born: Yasmin Parvaneh; 1964 (age 61–62); Oxford, England
- Other name: Yasmin Parvaneh
- Occupation: Model
- Years active: 1980s–present
- Spouse: Simon Le Bon (m. 1985)
- Children: 3; Including Amber Le Bon
- Modeling information
- Agency: The Model CoOp (New York); Elite Model Management (Paris); d'management group (Milan); Models 1 (London); Place Models (Hamburg); MIKAs (Stockholm); Chic Management (Sydney)
- Website: Official website

Yasmin Le Bon (née Parvaneh; born 1964) is an English model. She was one of the highest-earning models during the 1980s and has been married to Duran Duran's lead vocalist Simon Le Bon since 1985.

== Early life ==
Yasmin Parvaneh was born in 1964 in Oxford, England, the younger child of an Iranian father and an English mother. Yasmin attended Cherwell School in Oxford.

Her mother worked as a window dresser in Elliston's, a department store in Oxford, when she met Yasmin's father. Her father taught photography at a polytechnic.

== Career ==
She was spotted by a model scout in Oxford, at the age of 17. She modelled for a local agency while she attended school, and after leaving signed with Models 1 Agency in London. During her career as a fashion model she worked for and was a face for Versace, Chanel, Dior and many others top fashion designers.

In April 1987, she was hired by Guess for an advertising campaign.

She appeared on the cover of the first American and British issues of Elle and has also been on the covers of Vogue, V, I.D., Cosmopolitan, Marie Claire and Harper's Bazaar. As a model, she has also represented Ann Taylor, Banana Republic, Bergdorf Goodman, Biotherm, Bloomingdale's, Bonwit Teller, Calvin Klein, Versace, Chanel, Christian Dior, Clairol, Escada, Filene's, Frasercard, Avon and Gianfranco Ferré.

In 2010 she appeared in Duran Duran's "Girl Panic" video along with Cindy Crawford, Helena Christensen, Naomi Campbell, and Eva Herzigova.

In January 2012, Le Bon wore a gown weighing 50 kg (110 lb) in the Stéphane Rolland spring/summer Haute Couture show in Paris.

== Other endeavours ==
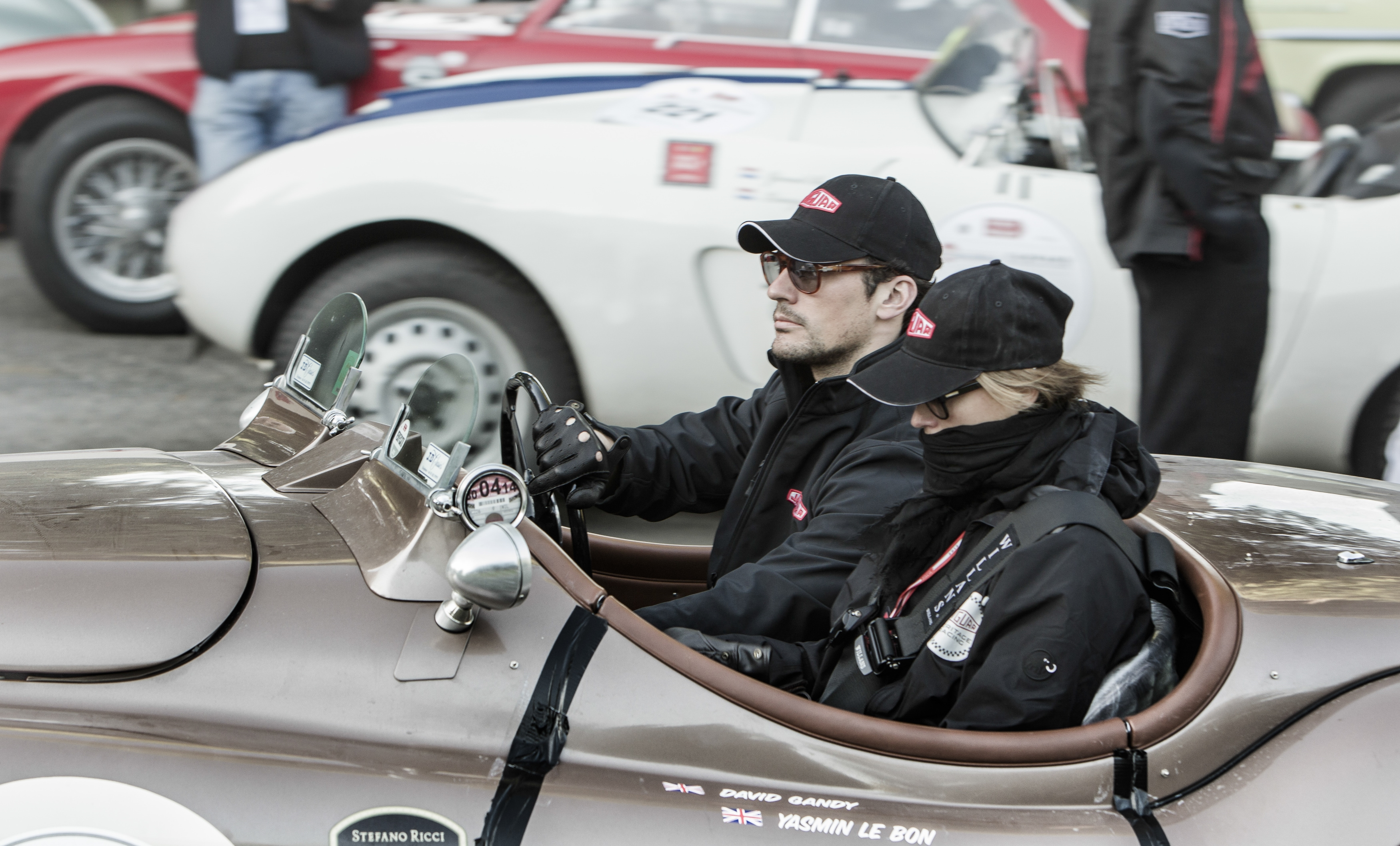
Le Bon and David Gandy

Le Bon was invited to be one of the drivers in the 2013 Mille Miglia race in Italy. Each year, the three-day event passes through nearly 200 Italian towns from Brescia to Rome and back, recreating the original races which took place between 1927 and 1957. She and her co-driver, David Gandy, were part of Team Jaguar, driving a 1950 Jaguar XK120. Early in the race, Le Bon and Gandy were "pushed off the road by a competitor", which caused body damage to the wing and side of the vintage car. They re-entered the race, ultimately finishing in 158th place out of 415 cars.

== Personal life ==
In 1984, she met Simon Le Bon, lead singer of the pop rock band Duran Duran, after he had seen her on a magazine cover and spoken with her agent. They married on 27 December 1985, at the register office in her hometown of Oxford. The couple have three children including Amber Le Bon.
