= Goodricke =

Goodricke is a surname. Notable people with the surname include:

== People ==
- Cecil Goodricke (1883–1944), South African sports sailor
- Francis Goodricke (1621–1673), English politician
- Francis Holyoake Goodricke (1797–1865), English politician
- Goodricke baronets, English baronetage (1641–1839)
  - Sir John Goodricke, 1st Baronet (1617–1670)
  - Sir Henry Goodricke, 2nd Baronet (1642–1705)
  - Sir John Goodricke, 5th Baronet (1708–1789)
- Henry Goodricke (1741–1784), English politician
- John Goodricke (1764–1786), English astronomer
- Thomas Goodricke (died 1554), English bishop

== Others ==
- Holyoake-Goodricke baronets
- 3116 Goodricke
- Goodricke-Pigott Observatory
- Goodricke College, York - a college of the University of York.
- Goodricke National Chess Academy
