= John Goodricke (disambiguation) =

John Goodricke (1764–1786) was an English astronomer.

John Goodricke may also refer to:

- Sir John Goodricke, 1st Baronet (1617–1670), MP for Yorkshire
- Sir John Goodricke, 5th Baronet (1708–1789), British diplomat and politician
- Sir John Goodricke, 3rd Baronet (1654–1705), of the Goodricke baronets
- Sir John Goodricke, 5th Baronet (1708–1789), of the Goodricke baronets
