= Stapylton baronets of Myton (1660) =

Extinct baronetcy in the Baronetage of England

Stapylton baronets
- Escutcheon of the Stapylton baronets of Myton
- Creation date: 1660
- Status: extinct
- Extinction date: 1817
- Seat: Myton Hall

The Stapylton baronetcy, or Stapleton, of Myton in Yorkshire, was created in the Baronetage of England on 22 June 1660 for Henry Stapylton.

Stapylton was a Member of Parliament for Boroughbridge. The second Baronet represented Aldborough and Boroughbridge in Parliament. The third Baronet was Member of Parliament for Boroughbridge. The fourth Baronet sat as a Knight of the Shire for Yorkshire. The title became extinct on the death of the eighth Baronet in 1817.

== Stapylton baronets, of Myton (1660) ==
- Sir Henry Stapylton, 1st Baronet (died 1679)
- Sir Bryan Stapylton, 2nd Baronet (died 1727)
- Sir John Stapylton, 3rd Baronet (died 1733)
- Sir Miles Stapylton, 4th Baronet (died 1752)
- Sir Bryan Stapylton, 5th Baronet (died 1772)
- Sir John Stapylton, 6th Baronet (died 1785)
- The Rev. Sir Martin Stapylton, 7th Baronet (died 1801)
- Sir Martin Stapylton, 8th Baronet (died 1817). He left no issue, and the baronetcy was extinct at his death.
