= Henry Goodricke =

Henry Goodricke may refer to:

- Sir Henry Goodricke, 2nd Baronet (1642–1705)
- Sir Henry Goodricke, 4th Baronet (1677–1738), of the Goodricke baronets
- Sir Henry Goodricke, 6th Baronet (1765–1802)
- Sir Henry Goodricke, 7th Baronet (1797–1833), of the Goodricke baronets
- Henry Goodricke (1741–1784), MP for Lymington 1778–80
