= Baron Darcy de Knayth =

Title in the Peerage of England

Baron Darcy de Knayth is a title in the Peerage of England. It was created in 1332 for John Darcy (or D'Arcy) with remainder to his heirs general, allowing daughters to inherit.

At the death of the sixth baron, the barony fell into abeyance between his two daughters, which the Sovereign terminated in 1641 in favour of Conyers Darcy, as he was also an heir of the abeyant Barony Darcy de Darcy (created 1509). He also successfully petitioned for the termination of the abeyance of the Barony of Conyers in his favour, and both baronies were considered new creations, with remainder to his heirs male. He was called to parliament as Baron Darcy and Conyers.

His son, also named Conyers Darcy, was granted the title of Earl of Holderness. The two titles remained united until the death of the fourth earl, when the earldom became extinct, while the baronies were claimed by his daughter, Lady Amelia. Lady Amelia was briefly married to the future fifth Duke of Leeds, and the sixth and seventh Dukes held the baronies de jure.

At the death of the seventh Duke of Leeds in 1859, the two baronies separated from the dukedom. Sackville Lane-Fox, eldest son of the 7th Duke of Leeds' eldest daughter, claimed the baronies de jure, which again became abeyant upon his death in 1888. The abeyance for the Barony of Conyers was terminated in 1892 in favour of Lane-Fox's eldest daughter Marcia Pelham, Countess of Yarborough. On 29 September 1903, the abeyance of the Barony of Darcy de Knayth was terminated in favour of Lane-Fox's younger daughter, Violet Herbert, Countess of Powis. At the same time, the 1641 ruling, considering the titles new creations only for the heirs male of Conyers Darcy, was reversed, and it was ruled that both baronies were to be held in remainder for heirs general.

== Barons Darcy de Knayth (1332) ==
- John Darcy, 1st Baron Darcy de Knayth (died 1347)
- John Darcy, 2nd Baron Darcy de Knayth (1317–1356) married Elizabeth de Meinill, daughter of Nicholas III de Meinill (1292 – 20 November 1341) (son of Nicholas II de Meinill, of Whorlton Castle) and Alice de Ros.
- John Darcy, 3rd Baron Darcy de Knayth (1351–1362)
- Philip Darcy, 4th Baron Darcy de Knayth (1341–1398) married Elizabeth Grey, second daughter of Thomas Grey, Knt., of Heton.
- John Darcy, 5th Baron Darcy de Knayth (1376–1411) married Margaret Grey, daughter of Henry Grey, 5th Baron Grey de Wilton.
- Philip Darcy, 6th Baron Darcy de Knayth (1397–1418) (abeyant 1418), married Eleanor FitzHugh, daughter of Henry FitzHugh, 3rd Baron FitzHugh. They had two daughters:
  - Elizabeth Darcy, married Sir James Strangeways.
  - Margaret Darcy, married Sir John Conyers of Hornby; their grandson William Conyers, 1st Baron Conyers was an ancestor of the 7th Baron.
- Conyers Darcy, 7th Baron Darcy de Knayth (1570–1654) (abeyance terminated 1641)
- Conyers Darcy, 1st Earl of Holderness, 8th Baron Darcy de Knayth (died 1689)
- Conyers Darcy, 2nd Earl of Holderness, 9th Baron Darcy de Knayth (c. 1620–1692)
- Robert Darcy, 3rd Earl of Holderness, 10th Baron Darcy de Knayth (1681–1722)
- Robert Darcy, 4th Earl of Holderness, 11th Baron Darcy de Knayth (1718–1778) (dormant)
- Amelia Osborne, de jure 12th Baroness Darcy de Knayth (née Darcy) (1754–1784)
- George William Frederick Osborne, 6th Duke of Leeds, de jure 13th Baron Darcy de Knayth (1775–1838)
- Francis Godolphin Darcy-Osborne, 7th Duke of Leeds, de jure 14th Baron Darcy de Knayth (1798–1859)
- Sackville Lane-Fox, 12th Baron Conyers, de jure 15th Baron Darcy de Knayth (1827–1888) (abeyant 1888)
- Violet Ida Evelyn Herbert, 16th Baroness Darcy de Knayth (1865–1929) (abeyance & dormancy terminated 1903)
- Mervyn Horatio Herbert, 17th Baron Darcy de Knayth (1904–1943)
- Davina Marcia Ingrams, 18th Baroness Darcy de Knayth (1938–2008)
- Caspar David Ingrams, 19th Baron Darcy de Knayth (born 1962)

The heir apparent is the present holder's son Hon. Thomas Rupert Ingrams (born 1999).

== See also ==
- Baron Darcy of Navan
