= Listed buildings in Myton-on-Swale =

Myton-on-Swale is a civil parish in the county of North Yorkshire, England. It contains five listed buildings that are recorded in the National Heritage List for England. Of these, one is listed at Grade I, the highest of the three grades, one is at Grade II*, the middle grade, and the others are at Grade II, the lowest grade. The parish includes the village of Myton-on-Swale and the surrounding area. The listed buildings consist of a country house and its gateway, a church, a house and a bridge.

== Key ==
Grade	Criteria
I	Buildings of exceptional interest, sometimes considered to be internationally important
II*	Particularly important buildings of more than special interest
II	Buildings of national importance and special interest

== Buildings ==
Name and location	Photograph	Date	Notes	Grade
St Mary's Church; 54.09382°N 1.32992°W		13th century	The church has been altered and extended through the centuries, including a restoration and changes by C. Hodgson Fowler in 1886. It is built in sandstone and has a green tile roof with bands of red tile. The church consists of a nave, a north aisle, a south porch, a chancel, and a west tower embraced by the nave. The tower has three stages, a two-light west window, two-light bell openings, a clock face on the south side, and an embattled parapet.	II*
Old Hall Farmhouse; 54.09164°N 1.33422°W	—	1664	The house is in pebbledashed brown brick, with quoins, a stepped and dentilled floor band, pilasters on the upper floor, and a hipped pantile roof. There are two storeys, an L-shaped plan, and three bays, the outer bays projecting. The central doorway has engaged Tuscan columns on plinths, an inscribed and dated frieze, a stepped brick entablature with three ball finials, and a broken pediment, and it is flanked by narrow sash windows. In the right bay is a two-light mullioned window, and the other windows are sashes. In the gable end is a shoulder-arched opening with an inserted casement window.	II
Myton Hall; 54.09617°N 1.32780°W		Late 17th century	A country house in stuccoed brick, with quoins on the corners and flanking the middle bay, a moulded string course, and a hipped Lakeland slate roof. There are two storeys, an L-shaped plan, and a front range of seven bays, the middle bay projecting. In the centre is a doorcase with an architrave, a keystone with monogramed consoles, and a segmental pediment with an achievement of arms. The doorway has fluted pilasters, a radial fanlight and paterae. The windows are sashes, the window above the doorway with an eared architrave and volutes, and on the roof are four flat-headed dormers.	I
Myton Bridge; 54.09475°N 1.33478°W		1868	The bridge crossing the River Swale is in cast iron, and consists of a shallow triple arch with openwork spandrels, and circular panels containing shields, each decorated with a lion in relief. There are iron cross-girders, and an octagonal patterned iron balustrade with a handrail. The abutments are in red brick with stone dressings and have corner piers, those on the river side with chamfered plinths, bracketed cornices and pyramidal caps. Outside them are brick parapet walls with stone coping on brackets, and at the end are shorter piers.	II
Gate piers, wall and railings, Myton Hall; 54.09598°N 1.32679°W		Undated	The two gate piers are in rusticated stone with laurel leaf decoration, and are surmounted by eagles. They are flanked by iron railings on low stone walls, and the iron gates have a scalloped top rail and a double middle rail with roundels.	II
