= Myton Bridge =

Bridge in Myton-on-Swale, North Yorkshire, England

Coordinates: 54°05′41″N 1°20′05″W

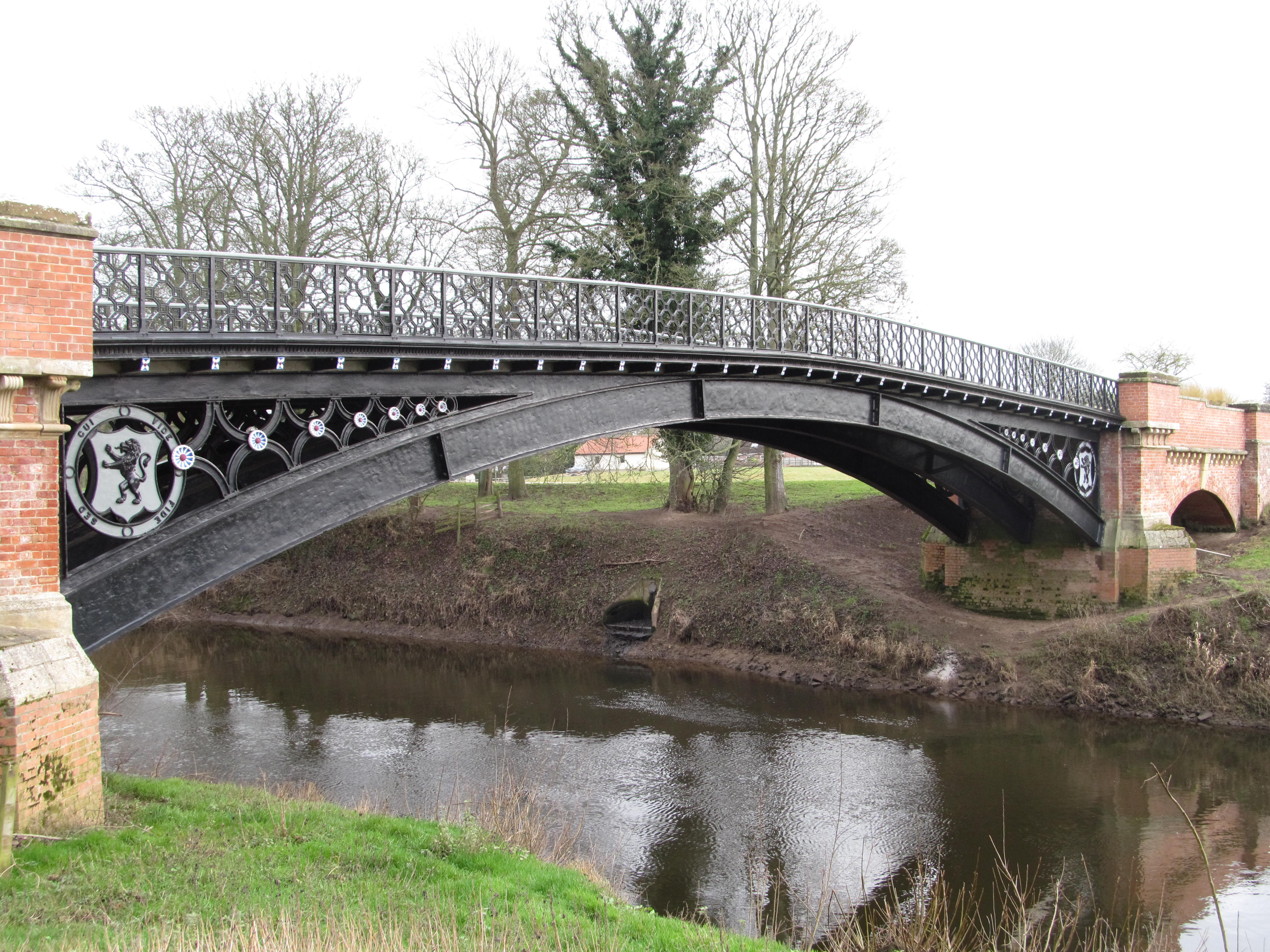
The bridge, in 2019

Myton Bridge is a historic structure in Myton-on-Swale, a village in North Yorkshire, in England.

A bridge over the River Swale in Myton was first recorded in the early 12th century, but it was demolished later in the century, and a replacement not built until 1313. It was a scene of fighting during the Battle of Myton, and had collapsed by 1354. In 1868, a new bridge was constructed at the same location, on the initiative of Henry Miles Stapylton. It has three arches, the central one, 100 feet (30 m) wide, for the river, and the others, each 24 feet (7.3 m) wide, for floodwater. The structure was designed by G. Gordon Page, under the supervision of his father, Thomas Page. The bridge was grade II listed in 1991, and was restored in 2002.

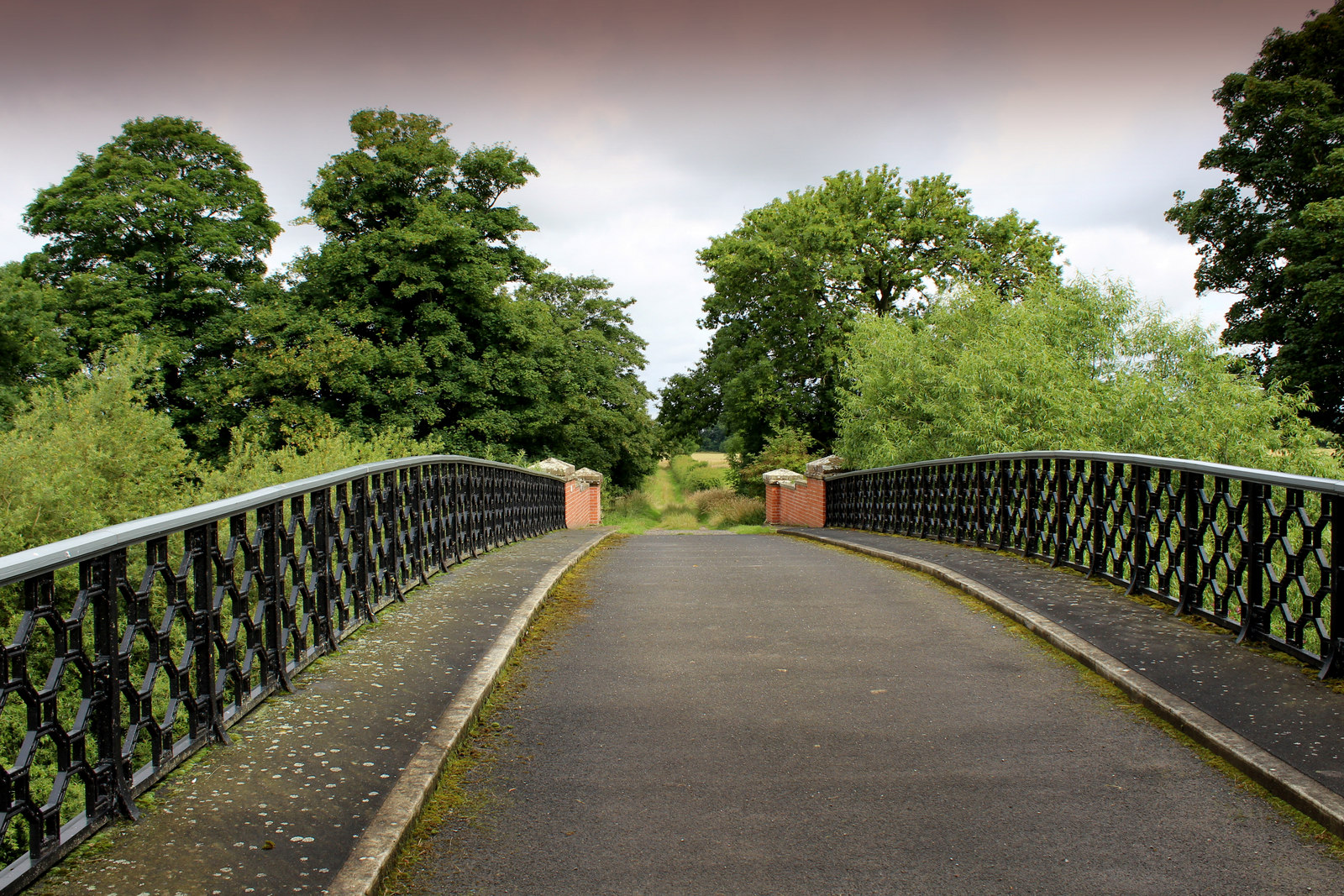
Deck of the bridge

The bridge is constructed cast iron, and consists of a shallow triple arch with openwork spandrels, and circular panels containing shields, each decorated with a lion in relief. There are iron cross-girders, and an octagonal patterned iron balustrade with a handrail. The abutments are in red brick with stone dressings and have corner piers, those on the river side with chamfered plinths, bracketed cornices and pyramidal caps. Outside them are brick parapet walls with stone coping on brackets, and at the end are shorter piers.

== See also ==
- Listed buildings in Myton-on-Swale
