= Holyoake-Goodricke baronets =

Extinct baronetcy in the Baronetage of the United Kingdom

The Holyoake-Goodricke Baronetcy, of Ribston Hall in the County of York and of Studley Castle in the County of Warwick, was a title in the Baronetage of the United Kingdom. It was created on 31 March 1835 for Francis Holyoake-Goodricke. He was descended from the Lytteltons of Studley Castle and was born Francis Lyttleton Holyoake. He was a partner in the Wolverhampton banking firm of Holyoake Goodricke & Co and was heir to the Yorkshire estates of his partner Sir Henry James Goodricke Bt (see Goodricke baronets) but not heir to the Goodricke Baronetcy. On succeeding to the estates in 1833 he changed his name to Holyoake-Goodricke. He was High Sheriff of Warwickshire in 1834 and was raised to the baronetcy in his own right in 1835. He sold the Yorkshire estates in 1836. The title became extinct on the death of the third Baronet in 1888.

== Holyoake-Goodricke baronets, of Ribston Hall and Studley Castle (1835) ==
- Sir Francis Lyttelton Holyoake-Goodricke, 1st Baronet (1797–1865)
- Sir Harry Holyoake-Goodricke, 2nd Baronet (1836–1883)
- Sir George Edward Holyoake-Goodricke, 3rd Baronet (1844–1888)
