= Henry Stapylton =

English politician

Sir Henry Stapylton, 1st Baronet (c. 1617 – 26 March 1679) was an English politician who sat in the House of Commons in 1648 and 1660.

Stapylton was the son of Brian Stapylton and his wife Frances Slingsby, daughter of Sir Henry Slingsby of Scriven.

In 1648, Stapylton was elected Member of Parliament for Boroughbridge in the Long Parliament but was excluded by the end of the year under Pride's Purge.

In 1660, Stapylton was elected MP for Boroughbridge in the Convention Parliament. In 1660 he was created baronet of Myton. In 1663 he was commissioned as Colonel of the Richmondshire Regiment, North Riding Militia.

Stapylton married Elizabeth Darcy, daughter of Conyers Darcy, 1st Earl of Holderness. His son Bryan succeeded him in the baronetcy.

Parliament of England
Preceded by Sir Philip Stapylton; Thomas Mauleverer	Member of Parliament for Boroughbridge; 1648; With: Thomas Mauleverer	Succeeded by Thomas Mauleverer
Baronetage of England
New creation	Baronet (of Myton); 1660–1679	Succeeded by Brian Stapylton
