= Listed buildings in Great Ribston with Walshford =

Great Ribston with Walshford is a civil parish in the county of North Yorkshire, England. It contains 25 listed buildings that are recorded in the National Heritage List for England. Of these, four are listed at Grade II*, the middle of the three grades, and the others are at Grade II, the lowest grade. The parish contains the village of Walshford and the surrounding area. The most important building in the parish is Ribston Hall, which is listed, and a large proportion of the listed buildings in the parish are associated with the hall, in its gardens or its grounds. The others are in the village, and consist of houses, an inn and a pinfold.

== Key ==
Grade	Criteria
II*	Particularly important buildings of more than special interest
II	Buildings of national importance and special interest

== Buildings ==
Name and location	Photograph	Date	Notes	Grade
St Andrew's Chapel, Ribston Hall; 53.97840°N 1.40372°W		1444	The chapel was altered in 1700 and again in about 1850. It is in limestone and sandstone, with sandstone quoins and a flat roof. It consists of a continuous nave and chancel, with a lean-to two-storey porch at the east end of the south wall, containing a doorway with a chamfered surround and a hood mould. At the south end is an embattled parapet, in the corner between the chapel and the hall is a stair tower, and at the west end is a parapet pierced with quatrefoils and two finials. In the west wall are three recesses, one containing a coat of arms.	II*
Ribston Hall; 53.97856°N 1.40402°W		1674	A country house that was extensively remodelled in the 1770s, it is in red brick with stone dressings, rusticated quoins, oversailing eaves, a modillion cornice, and hipped Westmorland slate roofs. There are two storeys and 15 bays. In the centre of the south front is a doorway with Corinthian columns and an open scrolled segmental pediment. The windows are sashes in architraves, those in the ground floor with floating cornices, and below the middle window in the upper floor is a decorated panel. At the rear, the outer two bays on each side project as wings. In the centre of the front is a doorway with Tuscan columns and a triangular pediment.	II*
Ha-ha, Ribston Hall; 53.97986°N 1.40786°W	—	Late 17th or early 18th century	The ha-ha to the west and south of the hall is in limestone blocks. It consists of a long wall about 1 metre (3 ft 3 in) high with eight courses. No coping has survived, and above it is an earth bank.	II
Pinfold; 53.97449°N 1.37024°W	—	18th century	The pinfold is in limestone and brick, partly rendered, with stone coping. It is a small enclosure with walls about 5 metres (16 ft) long and 2 metres (6 ft 7 in) high, with the entrance at the northeast corner.	II
Statue 10 metres from west side of stables, Ribston Hall; 53.97950°N 1.40515°W	—	18th century	The statue is in lead, and depicts a reclining putto with an owl and a scroll, and two putti with bats, on a square stone plinth.	II
Sundial, Ribston Hall; 53.97828°N 1.40460°W	—	18th century	The sundial in the grounds to the southwest of the hall is in stone. It has a square base, an octagonal stem with a bulbous centre band and fluting, and a corniced cap with a bronze dial.	II
The Bridge Inn; 53.97469°N 1.36935°W		18th century	The core of the building is a Georgian farmhouse, which has been considerably altered and extended through the 20th century. It consists of three parallel ranges; the farmhouse and an outbuilding have been converted into bars and offices, the stables are a dining room, and the barn is a storeroom and offices. There are two storeys and each range is about five bays long.	II
Stables north of Ribston Hall; 53.97952°N 1.40464°W	—	Mid to late 18th century	The stables are in red brick with stone dressings and hipped Westmorland slate roofs. They form four sides around a courtyard, with a free-standing range on each side linked by walls. The main range has a stone plinth, an impost band, and dentilled eaves. There are two storeys and nine bays, the middle three bays projecting under a triangular pediment containing a square plaque with a coat of arms. In the centre is a round-arched entrance flanked by round-headed windows in relieving arches, and in the upper floor are sash windows. On the roof is a cupola with a bell, on a square base, with a clock, a lead dome and a weathervane.	II*
Walshford Lodge, gate piers and walls 53.97379°N 1.37242°W		Mid to late 18th century	Flanking the entrance to the drive of Ribston Hall are lodges in stone with Westmorland slate roofs. Both lodges have a single storey, the left lodge has one bay, and the right lodge has two. Curving walls link each lodge to two pairs of gate piers, with banded rustication. The outer pair are about 3 metres (9.8 ft) high, and each is surmounted by a sphinx. The inner pair are about 4 metres (13 ft) high, and each has an entablature with a rosette motif, and a triangular pediment surmounted by a lion with its paw on a globe. The gates and railings are in wrought iron.	II*
Former laundry house, Ribston Hall; 53.97901°N 1.40457°W	—	Late 18th century	The former laundry house is in red brick, with a stone floor band, and a hipped Westmorland slate roof. There are two storeys and four bays. On the front are two doorways with fanlights, and the windows are sashes. All the openings have slightly cambered gauged brick arches.	II
Walled garden, building and gates, Ribston Hall; 53.98079°N 1.40543°W	—	Late 18th century	The garden is enclosed by red brick walls with stone coping. The building on the south side has two storeys and three bays, and a parapeted roof. It contains a central round-arched opening and sash windows. There are gateways at the north ends of the east and west walls, each flanked by square brick piers with banded cornices and urn finials. At the south end of the west wall is a gateway containing a Gothic arch with a double-chamfered surround and a hood mould, and surmounted by a large re-set head of Janus.	II
Fair View Cottage and Rose Cottage; 53.97543°N 1.36809°W	—	Early 19th century	A pair of houses in brown brick, with dentilled eaves and a pantile roof. There are two storeys, each house has two bays, and at the rear is a continuous outshut. On the front are two doorways, the windows are horizontally-sliding sashes, and the openings have cambered brick arches.	II
Huggins House; 53.97524°N 1.36878°W	—	Mid 19th century	The house is rendered, and has a Westmorland slate roof with stone coping. There are two storeys, a double depth plan, and two bays. In the centre is a doorway, and the windows are recessed sashes.	II
Folly, Ribston Hall; 53.98122°N 1.40660°W	—	Mid 19th century	The folly in the grounds of the hall is in gritstone, possibly incorporating medieval materials. It consists of a Gothic arch with a double-chamfered surround and a hood mould, flanked by gabled buttresses. On the ground around it are pieces of carved stone.	II
Rustic footbridge, Ribston Hall; 53.98111°N 1.40632°W	—	Mid 19th century	The decorative footbridge over a sunken pathway in the garden to the north of the hall is in sandstone. It consists of a single pointed arch with flat voussoirs. There is no parapet.	II
Stable house, Ribston Hall; 53.97937°N 1.40492°W	—	Mid 19th century	The house is in red and cream brick on a stone plinth, with a stone sill band, brick dentilled eaves, and a hipped Westmorland slate roof. There are two storeys and four bays. The wide doorway has a plain surround, a fanlight and a cornice, and the windows are sashes with flat gauged brick arches and stone sills.	II
Statue at north end of gardens, Ribston Hall; 53.98137°N 1.40544°W	—	19th century	The statue is in stone, and depicts a female figure in Greek costume fastening drapery over her right shoulder, standing on a square plinth.	II
Statue north west of stables, Ribston Hall; 53.97981°N 1.40545°W	—	19th century	The statue is in stone, and depicts a heavily draped female figure standing on a square plinth.	II
Statue west of stables, Ribston Hall; 53.97968°N 1.40556°W	—	19th century	The statue is in stone, and depicts a lightly draped figure, possibly representing a sower, standing on a square plinth with scroll decoration.	II
Statue on terrace (left), Ribston Hall; 53.97847°N 1.40415°W	—	19th century	The statue is in stone, and depicts a female standing figure in classical drapery, possibly representing Spring, standing on a square plinth.	II
Statue on terrace (right), Ribston Hall; 53.97838°N 1.40407°W	—	19th century	The statue is in stone, and depicts a slightly bent female figure in classical drapery, possibly representing Autumn, standing on a square plinth.	II
Statue south of walled garden (left), Ribston Hall; 53.98015°N 1.40495°W	—	19th century	The statue is in stone, and depicts a scantily-clad female figure representing Summer, glancing over her left shoulder towards a statue representing Winter, standing on a square plinth.	II
Statue south of walled garden (right), Ribston Hall; 53.98014°N 1.40487°W	—	19th century	The statue is in stone, and depicts an elderly man wrapped in cloak gazing mournfully at the ground, representing Winter, standing on a square plinth.	II
Terrace walls, steps and urns, Ribston Hall; 53.97837°N 1.40432°W	—	19th century	The terrace wall is in stone with flat coping. At each end, two shallow steps lead down to a grassed area, these are flanked by low ramped walls and two urns. There is a fifth urn in the centre of the terrace wall.	II
Bridge at Ribston Lodge; 53.97703°N 1.39968°W		1855	The bridge, which carries a road over the River Nidd, is in sandstone and limestone. It consists of a large central round arch flanked by smaller arches, with triangular cutwaters and voussoirs. The parapet is pointed, and has squared and chamfered balusters, and a cast iron date plaque. There are pyramidal blocks over the piers flanking the central arch.	II
