= Sir Thomas Mauleverer, 1st Baronet =

English politician and prominent Roundhead

Sir Thomas Mauleverer, 1st Baronet (9 April 1599 – c. June 1655) was an English politician and prominent Roundhead during the English Civil War.

Sir Thomas Mauleverer was born into a family with large estates in Yorkshire. His father, Sir Richard Mauleverer (c.1528-1603), had been High Sheriff of Yorkshire and Mauleverer served as a justice of the peace in the West Riding. In 1630, he was knighted by King Charles – but was obliged to pay for the privilege under the King's policy of distraint of knighthood. He was elected to the Long Parliament in November 1640 as MP for Boroughbridge. The King created him a baronet in August 1641, hoping to gain his support, but Mauleverer supported Parliament during the English Civil War and raised a regiment of foot and a troop of horse for Parliament out of his own pocket – for which he later claimed £15,000 reimbursement.

Mauleverer's troops became notorious for pillaging and defiling churches. He was with the Fairfaxes when they were routed at the Battle of Adwalton Moor in June 1643, then escaped to Hull with Lord Fairfax. When the Royalists marched to besiege Hull, Fairfax commissioned Mauleverer to seek out spies and traitors in the town. He accompanied Sir Thomas Fairfax to the relief of Nantwich in January 1644, but while he was on campaign, his ancestral estate at Allerton Mauleverer was plundered by Royalists.

Mauleverer was appointed a commissioner of the High Court of Justice in January 1649, and was a signatory of the King's death warrant. During the Commonwealth, Mauleverer was active as a justice of the peace in Yorkshire. He died in June 1655. His son and heir Sir Richard Mauleverer had fought for the Royalists, so was allowed to succeed to the baronetcy after the Restoration.

Parliament of England
Preceded by The Lord Fairfax of Cameron	Member of Parliament for Boroughbridge; 1640–1653; With: Sir Philip Stapleton 1640–1647; Henry Stapylton 1648	Succeeded by Not represented in the Barebones Parliament
Baronetage of England
New creation	Baronet of Allerton; 1641–1655	Succeeded by Richard Mauleverer
