= St Mary's Church, Myton-on-Swale =

Church in Myton-on-Swale, North Yorkshire, England

Coordinates: 54°05′38″N 1°19′48″W

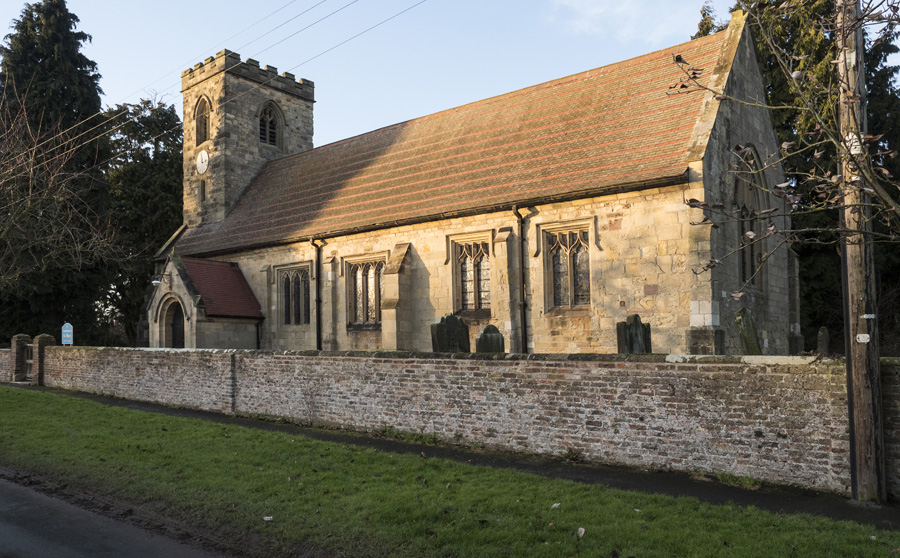
The church, in 2017

St Mary's Church is the parish church of Myton-on-Swale, a village in North Yorkshire, in England.

The church was built in the early 13th century, and was altered in the 15th century, when some of the windows were replaced. The building was restored by C. Hodgson Fowler in 1886, when the tower and porch were added, and the roof was replaced. The church was grade II* listed in 1960.

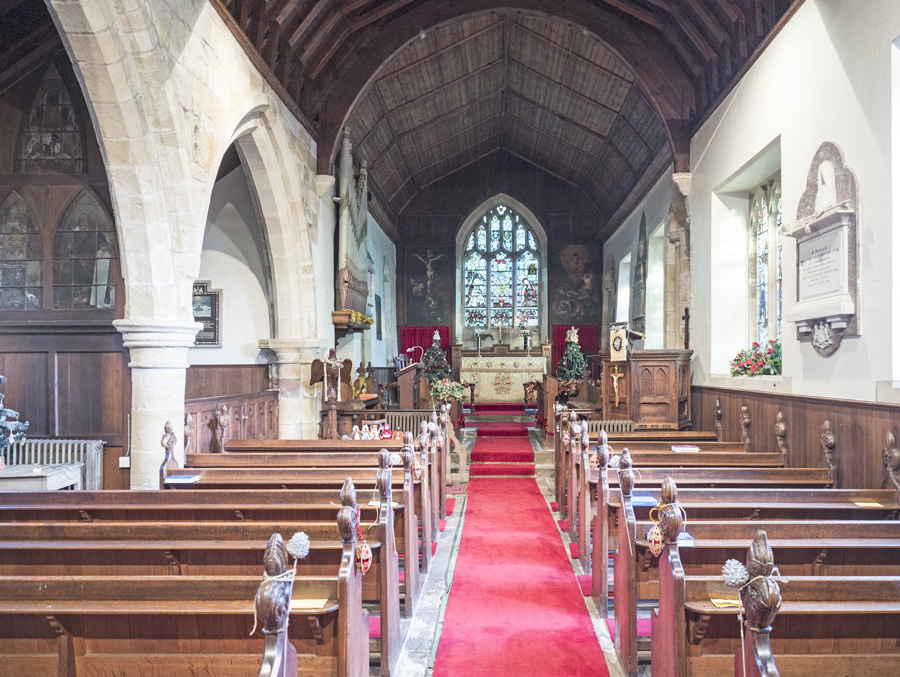
The nave and chancel

The church is built of sandstone and has a green tile roof with bands of red tile. The building consists of a nave, a north aisle, a south porch, a chancel, and a west tower embraced by the nave. The tower has three stages, a two-light west window, two-light bell openings, a clock face on the south side, and an embattled parapet. Inside, the furnishing date from 1886 or later, but there is the head of a 13th-century cross slab. The east window has stained glass designed by Charles Eamer Kempe.

== See also ==
- Grade II* listed churches in North Yorkshire (district)
- Listed buildings in Myton-on-Swale
