= Studley Castle =

Country house in Warwickshire, England

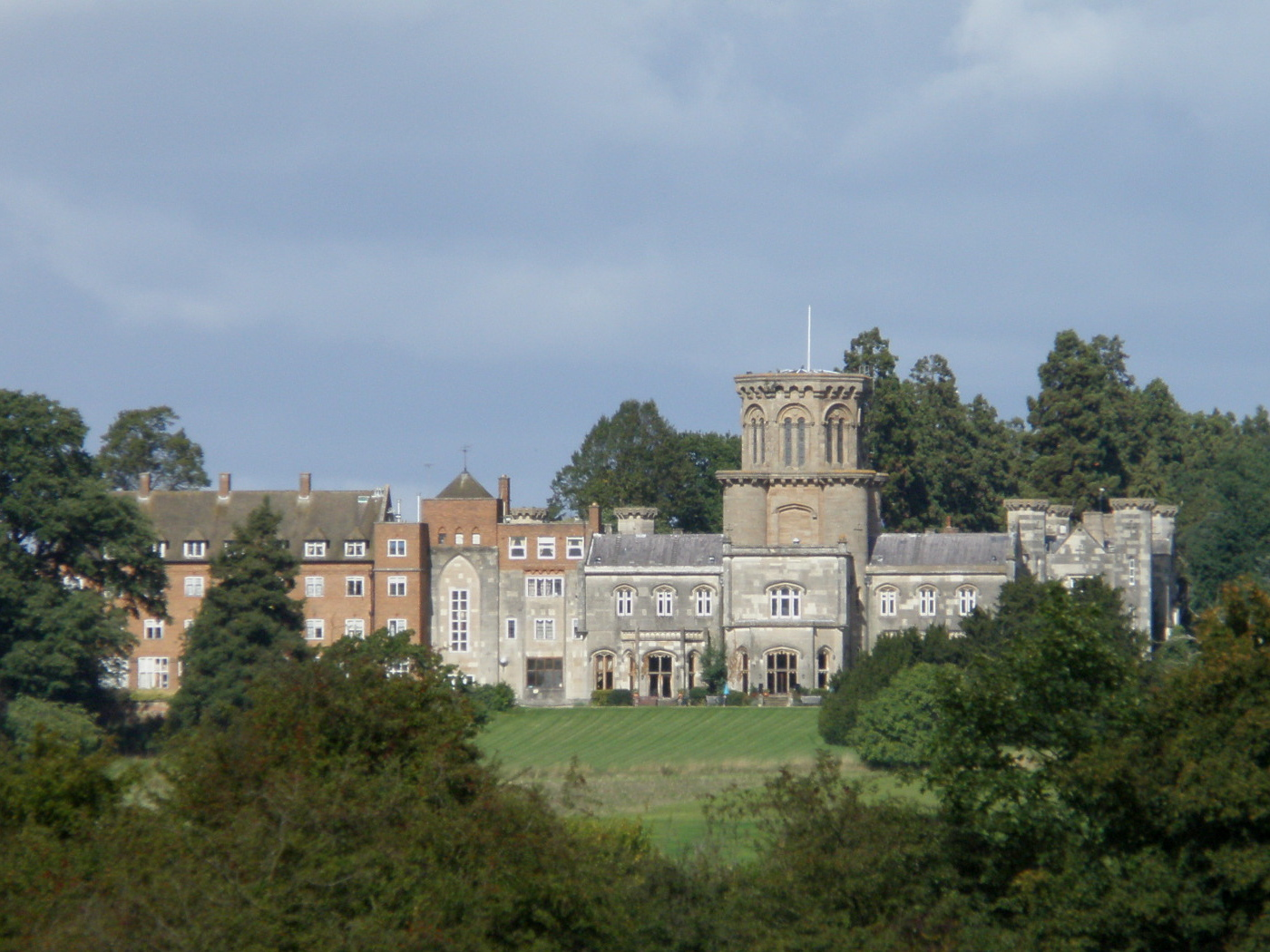
- Interactive map of Studley Castle
- 52.2748°N 1.8724°W
- Location: Studley, Warwickshire, England

Listed Building – Grade II*
- Official name: Studley Castle
- Designated: 11 December 1969
- Reference no.: 1355446

Studley Castle is a 19th-century country house at Studley, Warwickshire, England.

The Grade II* listed building is now occupied as a Warner Leisure Hotel but was once owned by the Lyttelton family before being bequeathed by Philip Lyttleton to his niece Dorothy, who married Francis Holyoake.

Their son Francis Lyttelton Holyoake, the High Sheriff of Warwickshire in 1834, inherited Ribston Hall in Yorkshire from a business partner in 1833 and changed his name to Holyoake-Goodricke. The sale of the Yorkshire property financed the building of a new mansion at Studley. The new house, designed in Gothic Revival style by the architect Samuel Beazley, was completed in 1836.

The building has never actually been used as a castle. The site of the medieval castle at Studley is occupied by the nearby 16th-century house known as Old Studley Castle.

The house was occupied by Studley College between 1903 and the early 1960s and was used as a horticultural training establishment for ladies. It later became training and Marketing Centre for the former automotive brand, Rover.

In more recent times the Castle was converted for use as a hotel. After a £50 million refurbishment it reopened in April 2019 as the 14th hotel in the Warner Leisure Hotels collection.
