= Ken Morrison =

English businessman (1931–2017)

Sir Ken Morrison CBE
- Born: Kenneth Duncan Morrison; 20 October 1931; Bradford, West Riding of Yorkshire, England
- Died: 1 February 2017 (aged 85); Myton-on-Swale, North Yorkshire, England
- Occupation: Businessman
- Years active: 1952–2017
- Title: President of Wm Morrison Supermarkets (until 2017)
- Spouse(s): Barbara Cummings (m. 1957, divorced) Edna (until 1993, her death); Lynne Dent, Lady Morrison (until 2017, his death)
- Children: 5
- Parent(s): William and Hilda Morrison
- Relatives: Chris Blundell (nephew)

Sir Kenneth Duncan Morrison CBE (20 October 1931 – 1 February 2017) was an English businessman, Life President, and former chairman of Morrisons (Wm Morrison Supermarkets PLC), the fifth largest supermarket group in the United Kingdom. He was the son of William Morrison, who founded the company.

== Early and private life ==
He was the youngest child of William Murdoch Morrison and Hilda Morrison (née Ryder), who owned a small grocery chain set up in 1899. He was born in Bradford, and was brought up by five elder sisters.

Whilst at Bradford Grammar School, Morrison worked in the family provisions business in the school holidays. He was given jobs such as working on the market stalls or checking eggs against lamps for defects.

Morrison served in the Royal Army Ordnance Corps as a National Serviceman, and was demobilised in 1952. His father was seriously ill, so Ken began to manage the business at the age of 26.

Morrison received the CBE in 1990 and was knighted in the 2000 New Year Honours list for services to the food retailing industry. In the Sunday Times Rich List 2007 ranking of the wealthiest people in the UK he was placed 35th with an estimated family fortune of £1,595 million. Today, his family retain 15.5% of the company. In the Sunday Times Rich List 2013, his family's wealth was estimated to be £1.05bn, making them 83rd in the list of the 1,000 richest people in the UK.

Morrison lived in Myton Hall, Myton-upon-Swale, North Yorkshire, with his wife Lynne, and his two youngest children.

== Business career ==
By 1956, he was the chairman and managing director of a small group of shops, the embryo of what was to become a formidable retail presence, a household name throughout the UK and the largest public company headquartered in Yorkshire.

Whilst the family business was named after his father, Morrisons' head office "Hilmore House" is named after his mother. The original Hilmore House was located in Thornton Road, but moved to larger premises at Gain Lane as a result of the takeover of Safeway.

Just after the takeover of Safeway (completed in 2004), Morrison went from a respected industry figure to a target for disgruntled investors furious at the mishandling of the transaction. Previously, in 2001, Morrison had described Safeway as an "indigestible meal" for his supermarket group.

Following the Safeway takeover the Morrison group issued five profit warnings, due to integration problems. Morrisons later recovered its financial performance and in September 2006, it announced a £134.2m half-year pre-tax profit for the 25 weeks to 23 July 2006. This was a company record, and convinced City commentators that Morrisons had recovered. Morrison was the longest serving chairman of a top 100 public company in the UK.

In June 2006, Ken Morrison announced that he would relinquish executive control of the company, which came into effect from 4 September, making way for the appointment of Dutchman Marc Bolland as chief executive. He announced that it was his intention to stand down as the chairman and director of the company in January 2008, and take the honorary post of Life President. He eventually stood down on 13 March 2008.

== Death ==
Ken Morrison died on 1 February 2017 after a brief illness. He was 85 years old.
