= Walshford =

Hamlet in North Yorkshire, England

Coordinates: 53.9750°N 1.3686°W

- Hamlet
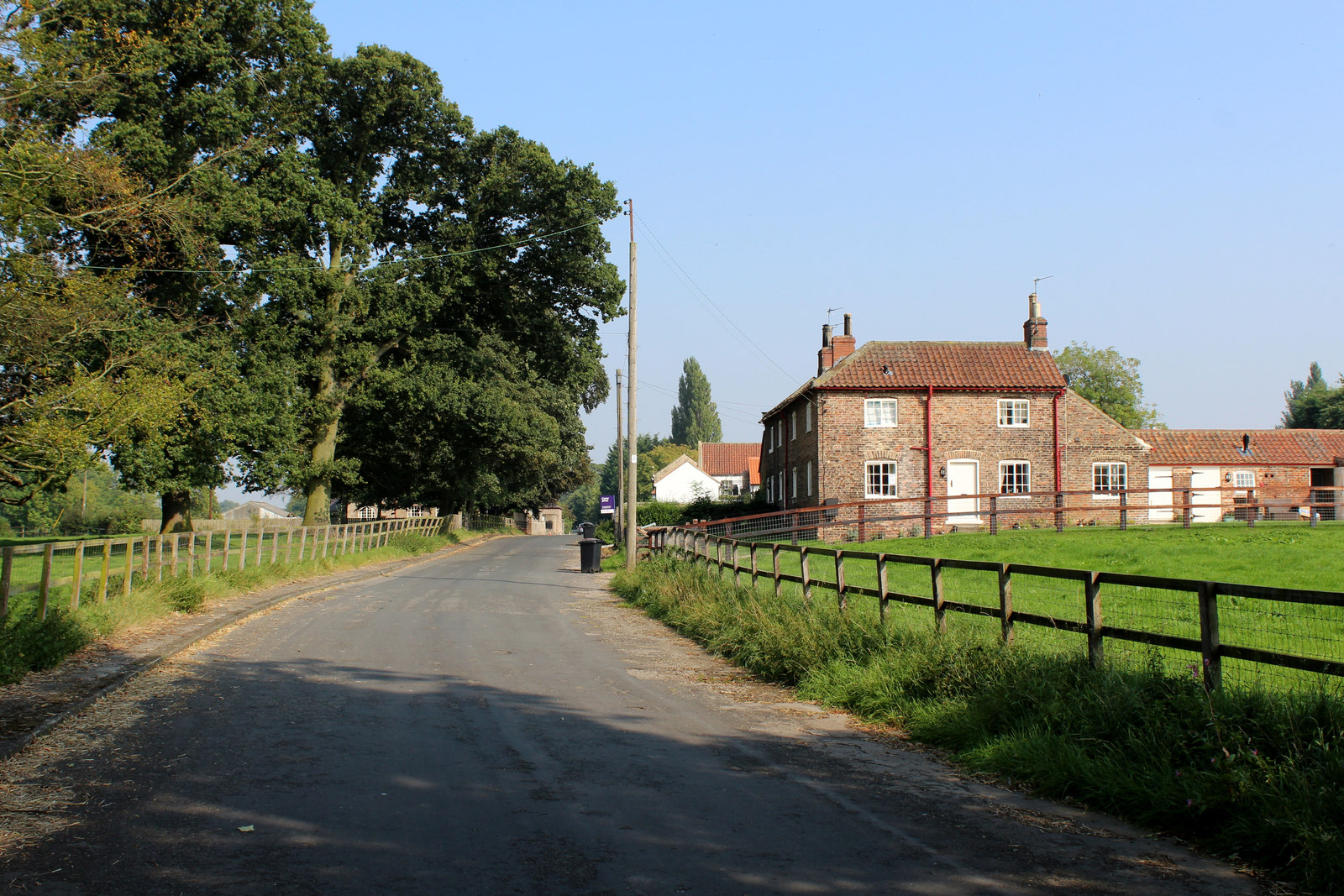
- Road in Walshford

- Location within North Yorkshire
- OS grid reference: SE415533
- Civil parish: Great Ribston with Walshford
- Unitary authority: North Yorkshire
- Ceremonial county: North Yorkshire
- Region: Yorkshire and the Humber
- Country: England
- Sovereign state: United Kingdom
- Police: North Yorkshire
- Fire: North Yorkshire
- Ambulance: Yorkshire
- UK Parliament: Wetherby and Easingwold

Walshford is a hamlet in the civil parish of Great Ribston with Walshford, in the county of North Yorkshire, England. The hamlet is 3 miles (5 km) north of Wetherby, 5 miles (8 km) north-east of Knaresborough, and 9 miles (14 km) south of Boroughbridge.

== History ==
Walshford is on the A168 road (originally the A1 road, which now by-passes Walshford) and on the River Nidd. Historically, the hamlet was in the parish of Hunsingore, in the wapentake of Claro. However, it is now in the civil parish of Great Ribston with Walshford, which had an estimated population of 70 in 2015.

Until 1974 it was part of the West Riding of Yorkshire. From 1974 to 2023 it was part of the Borough of Harrogate, it is now administered by the unitary North Yorkshire Council.

The hamlet does not appear in the Domesday Book, the name first being recorded in 1214 as Walleford. The name means ford of the Welshmen, though the ford has long since disappeared. A bridge was first recorded at Walshford in the 13th century (around the same time as the name), and later a chapel built by the Knights Templar was erected (probably near to the bridge), but this was removed during the Dissolution, when the bridge was renovated.

There are only a few houses, but The Bridge Inn, a former was a coaching inn on the Great North Road still exists. The inn is a converted farmhouse on the A168 road, and is a grade II listed structure. One of the rooms is known as the "Byron Room", after the woodcarving and plaster were removed to the Bridge Inn from Halnaby Hall in the 1950s. Halnaby Hall was where Byron spent his honeymoon, or as he described it, his "treaclemoon". The nearest railway station was Allerton/Hopperton (on what is now the Harrogate line), however since this closed in 1962, the nearest open station is Cattal on the same line.

== See also ==
- Listed buildings in Great Ribston with Walshford
