= Francis Holyoake Goodricke =

British landowner and politician

Sir Francis Lyttelton Holyoake Goodricke, 1st Baronet (1797 – 29 December 1865) was a British landowner and politician. He served as Member of Parliament from 1835 to 1837.

== Biography ==
He was born Francis Lyttelton Holyoake, the eldest son of Francis Holyoake of Tettenall, Staffordshire. In 1827 he married Elizabeth Martha, daughter of George Payne of Sulby Hall, Welford. In 1833 Holyoake adopted the additional name and arms of Goodricke on succeeding to a large portion of the estates of Sir Harry Goodricke (to whom he was not related), including Ribston Hall, Yorkshire.

He was elected as Conservative Member of Parliament for Stafford at the 1835 general election, and shortly afterwards he was created a baronet. In May 1835 he took the Chiltern Hundreds in order to sit for South Staffordshire, following Edward Littleton's elevation to the peerage; his successor at the borough of Stafford was not elected until early 1837.

Holyoake Goodricke retired from Parliament at the 1837 election. He lived at 19 Arlington Street, London and at Studley Castle, Warwickshire, and was patron of one living. Until 1858 he was a partner in the firm of Holyoake, Goodricke and Co., bankers of Wolverhampton.

Baronetage of the United Kingdom
New creation	Baronet (of Ribston Hall and Studley Castle); 1835–1865	Succeeded by Harry Holyoake-Goodricke
