= Myton Hall =

Building in Myton-on-Swale, North Yorkshire, England

Coordinates: 54°05′46″N 1°19′40″W

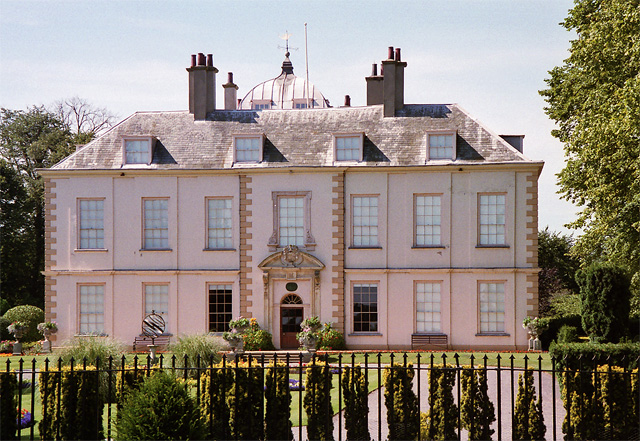
The building, in 2002

Myton Hall is a historic building in Myton-on-Swale, a village in North Yorkshire, in England.

The manor of Myton was first recorded during the reign of Edward the Confessor. It passed to St Mary's Abbey, York, then at the Dissolution of the Monasteries on to the Crown. In about 1610, it was purchased by Bryan Stapylton, and thereafter passed down the line of the Stapylton baronets. The current manor house was probably built in the 1680s and is thought to have been designed by John Etty. A datestone reading 1693 has been reset into the house, which was extended and slightly altered in the 18th century. A tower was added in about 1900. The house was grade II listed in 1952. It was finally sold by the Stapyltons in 1952, and in 1987 it was purchased by Ken Morrison.

The house is built of stuccoed brick, with quoins on the corners and flanking the middle bay, a moulded string course, and a hipped Lakeland slate roof. It has two storeys, an L-shaped plan, and a front range of seven bays, the middle bay projecting. In the centre is a doorcase with an architrave, a keystone with monogramed consoles, and a segmental pediment with an achievement of arms. The doorway has fluted pilasters, a radial fanlight and paterae. The windows are sashes, the window above the doorway with an eared architrave and volutes, and on the roof are four flat-headed dormers.

Inside the house, the staircase hall is panelled and has an early staircase. The saloon is decorated in the Palladian style, with woodwork and plasterwork surviving, while the dining room retains its 17th-century ceiling and several other rooms are described by Historic England as having "good interiors".

== See also ==
- Grade I listed buildings in North Yorkshire (district)
- Listed buildings in Myton-on-Swale
