= Brian Stapylton =

English Tory politician

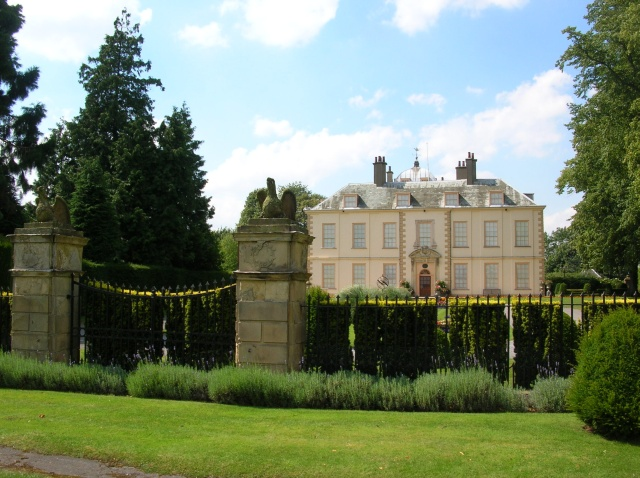
Myton Hall, Myton-on-Swale

Sir Brian Stapylton, 2nd Baronet (c. 1657 – 23 November 1727), of Myton Hall in Yorkshire, was an English Tory politician who sat in the English and British House of Commons between 1679 and 1715

Stapylton was the eldest son of Sir Henry Stapylton and his wife Elizabeth Darcy, daughter of Conyers Darcy, 1st Earl of Holderness, of Hornby Castle, Yorkshire. His father had been a Member of Parliament during the Commonwealth and was created a baronet shortly after the Restoration in 1660. Stapylton matriculated at Christ Church, Oxford on 3 November 1674, aged 17, and was awarded BA in 1677. He succeeded to the baronetcy and Myton Hall following his father's death on 26 March 1679.

Stapylton was returned as Member of Parliament for Aldborough on the Wentworth interest at the second general election of 1679. He was inactive in the second Exclusion Parliament, and did not stand again until after the Revolution. He married Anne Kaye, daughter of Sir John Kaye, 2nd Baronet of Woodsome on 15 April 1680. In 1683, he became JP for West Yorkshire and served as High Sheriff of Yorkshire for the year 1683 to 1684. He became Deputy Lieutenant of Yorkshire in 1685. In 1688 he was removed from his local offices as JP and DL, but was re-instated in 1689.

At the 1690 English general election, Stapylton was returned as MP for Boroughbridge, which had been his father's seat. He was returned again until the 1715 British general election.

Stapylton died on 23 November 1727. He and his wife had three children:

- John Stapylton (c. 1683 – 1733)
- Anne Stapylton
- Elizabeth

Stapylton was succeeded in the baronetcy by his son John

Stapylton's surname is sometimes spelt Stapleton, and some documents spell his first name as Bryan.

Parliament of England
| Preceded by Henry Arthington; Sir Godfrey Copley, Bt | Member of Parliament for Aldborough; 1679–1681; With: Sir Godfrey Copley, Bt | Succeeded by Sir John Reresby, Bt; Sir Godfrey Copley, Bt |
| Preceded by Sir Henry Goodricke, Bt; Christopher Vane | Member of Parliament for Boroughbridge; 1690–1695; With: Sir Henry Goodricke, Bt | Succeeded by Sir Henry Goodricke, Bt; Thomas Harrison |
| Preceded by Sir Henry Goodricke, Bt; Thomas Harrison | Member of Parliament for Boroughbridge; 1698–1705; With: Sir Henry Goodricke, Bt | Succeeded by Craven Peyton; John Stapylton |
Parliament of Great Britain
| Preceded by Craven Peyton; John Stapylton | Member of Parliament for Boroughbridge; 1708–1715; With: Craven Peyton 1708–1713; Edmund Dunch 1713–1715 | Succeeded by Thomas Wilkinson; Sir Richard Steele |
Baronetage of England
| Preceded by Henry Stapylton | Baronet (of Myton); 1679–1727 | Succeeded by John Stapylton |
