= William Morrison (businessman) =

English businessman (1878–1956)

- Born: William Murdoch Morrison; 19 July 1878; Ossett, West Yorkshire, England
- Died: 3 August 1956 (aged 78); Bradford, West Yorkshire, England
- Occupation: Businessman
- Years active: 1899–1956
- Known for: Founder of Morrisons
- Spouse: Hilda Morrison (née Ryder)
- Children: 6, including Ken Morrison

William Murdoch Morrison (19 July 1878 – 3 August 1956) was the English founder of the business which would, after his death, become the Morrisons supermarket chain.

== Career ==
Brought up in Bradford, West Yorkshire, William Morrison started selling eggs and butter on a wholesale basis in 1899. Shortly afterwards he opened a stall in Bradford and then others in nearby towns. He opened his first proper stores in the 1920s - but still only in the Bradford area. This then became Morrisons.

His son Ken Morrison took over as chairman in 1956 following William's death.
