= Mauleverer baronets =

Extinct baronetcy in the Baronetage of England

The Mauleverer Baronetcy, of Allerton in the County of York, was a title in the Baronetage of England. It was created on 4 August 1641 for Thomas Mauleverer, Member of Parliament for Boroughbridge. The second and third Baronets also represented this constituency in the House of Commons. The title became extinct on the death of the fifth Baronet in 1713.

== Mauleverer baronets, of Allerton (1641) ==
- Sir Thomas Mauleverer, 1st Baronet (1599–1655)
- Sir Richard Mauleverer, 2nd Baronet (c. 1623–1675)
- Sir Thomas Mauleverer, 3rd Baronet (c. 1643–1687)
- Sir Richard Mauleverer, 4th Baronet (died 1689)
- Sir Richard Mauleverer, 5th Baronet (1689–1713)
