= Conyers Darcy, 2nd Earl of Holderness =

English politician

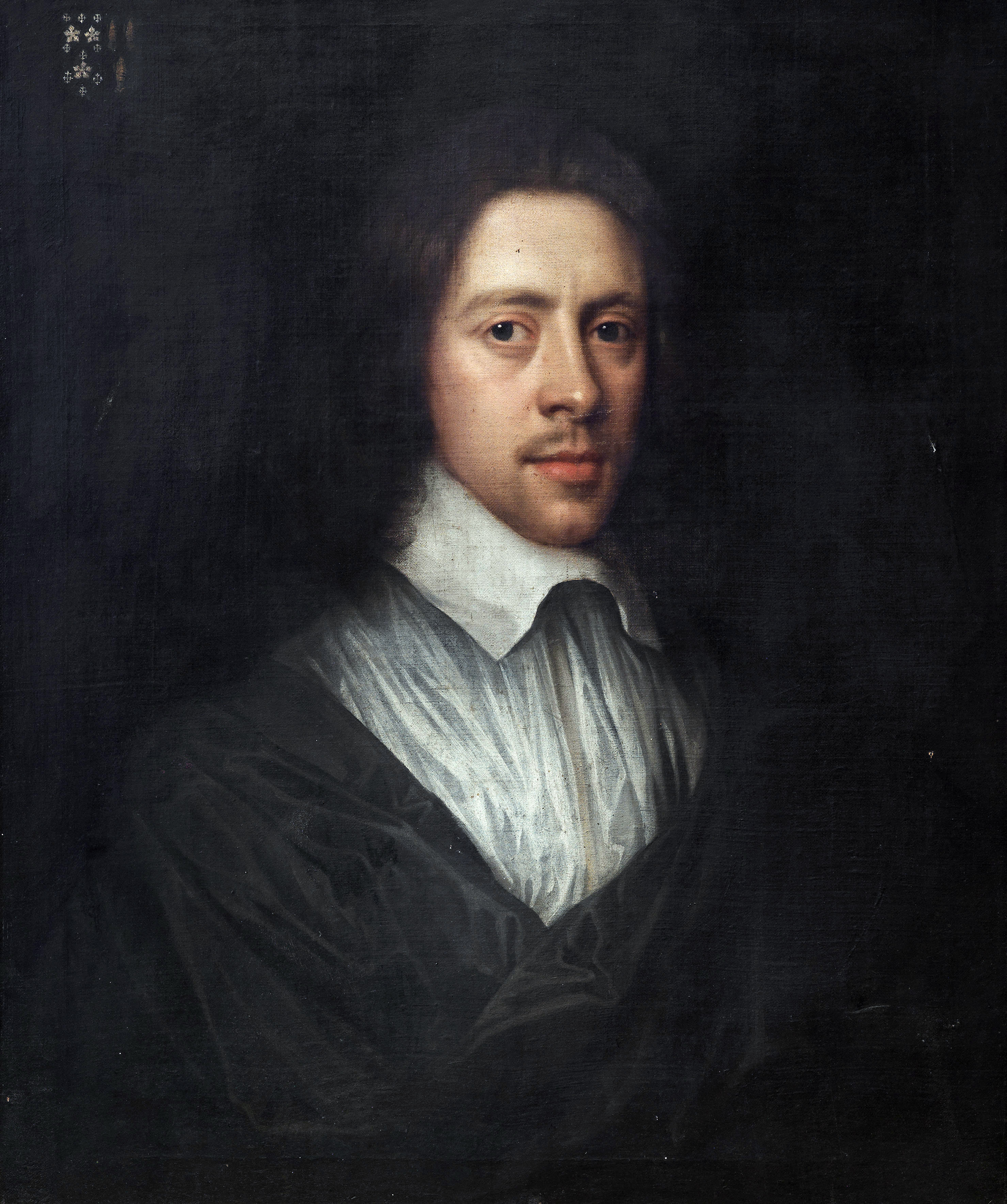
Conyers Darcy, 2nd Earl of Holderness

Conyers Darcy, 2nd Earl of Holderness (1622 – 13 December 1692) was an English politician who sat in the House of Commons from 1660 to 1679 and later became a peer.

== Life ==
Darcy was the eldest son of Conyers Darcy, 8th Lord Darcy of Knayth and 5th Lord Conyers and his wife Grace Rokeby, daughter of Thomas Rokeby of Skiers. He was a student of University College, Oxford in 1637 and of Gray's Inn in 1640.

In 1660, Darcy was elected Member of Parliament for Boroughbridge in the Convention Parliament. He was elected MP for Yorkshire in 1661 for the Cavalier Parliament. From the 1660s until December 1681, when he handed over to his own son, Darcy was Colonel of the Richmondshire Regiment, North Riding Militia. In November 1680 he was elevated to the House of Lords by Writ of acceleration, sitting as Baron Conyers. On his father's elevation to an earldom in 1682, he acquired the courtesy title Lord Darcy de Knayth. He succeeded as 2nd Earl of Holderness, 9th Baron Darcy de Knayth and 6th Baron Conyers on his father's death on 14 June 1689.

== Family ==
Darcy married four times; firstly to Lady Catherine Fane, daughter of Francis Fane, 1st Earl of Westmorland. His second marriage took place on 8 February 1650 to Lady Frances Howard (c. 1627–1670), daughter of Thomas Howard, 1st Earl of Berkshire. He married thirdly, in 1676, Lady Frances Seymour, daughter of William Seymour, 2nd Duke of Somerset. His fourth and final marriage was on 8 January 1685 to The Hon. Elizabeth Frescheville (1635–1690), daughter of John Frescheville, 1st Baron Frescheville.

Darcy's eldest son and heir apparent was John Darcy, Lord Conyers (c. 1659–1689) who was by his second marriage to Frances Howard. John Darcy married Bridget, daughter of Robert Sutton, 1st Baron Lexinton. However, this son John predeceased his father, and so, upon the death of Lord Holderness in 1692, the earldom passed to Robert Darcy, 3rd Earl of Holderness (1681–1722), John's second but oldest surviving son.

== Styles ==
- Mr Conyers Darcy (1622–1641)
- The Hon. Conyers Darcy (1641–1682)
- The Lord Conyers (1680–82)
- Lord Darcy de Knayth (1682–1689)
- The Earl of Holderness (1689–1692)

Parliament of England
Preceded by Sir Henry Stapylton (Second seat vacant)	Member of Parliament for Boroughbridge; 1660; With: Sir Henry Stapylton	Succeeded by Sir Richard Mauleverer; Robert Long
Preceded by The Lord Fairfax; Sir John Dawnay	Member of Parliament for Yorkshire; 1661–1679; With: Sir John Goodricke 1661–1670; Sir Thomas Slingsby 1670–1679	Succeeded by The Lord Fairfax; Viscount Dungarvan
Peerage of England
Preceded by Conyers Darcy	Earl of Holderness; 1689–1692	Succeeded by Robert Darcy
Preceded by Conyers Darcy	Baron Conyers (writ in acceleration); 1680–1692	Succeeded by Robert Darcy
