= Craven Peyton =

English politician

- Born: 1663
- Died: December 25, 1738

Craven Peyton (c. 1663 – 25 December 1738) of Stratton Street, Westminster, was an English politician who sat in the English and British House of Commons between 1705 and 1718 and Warden of the Mint from 1708 until his removal in 1714.

== Early life ==
Born c. 1663, Peyton was the only son of the former Jane Robinson and Sir Robert Peyton of East Barnet, Knight of the Shire of Middlesex. His father, a leading Exclusionist, fled to Holland in 1685 due to his involvement in the Monmouth Rebellion. He "returned to England with the Prince of Orange in November 1688, but died the following year, in great debt, and without having regained possession of his estates." Craven was arrested at his father's funeral but came to an agreement with his father's creditors and was released.

His maternal grandfather was Lionel Robinson of Cowton Grange, Yorkshire and his paternal grandfather was Henry Peyton, examiner in Chancery from 1632 to 1654.

He was educated at Lincoln's Inn in 1680 before attending Exeter College, Oxford, where he matriculated on 13 May 1681, aged 17. He was a Captain of the Marquess of Winchester's Regiment of horse in 1690.

== Career ==
After unsuccessfully trying to stand for Middlesex, his father's former seat in the House, in 1695, he "did not stand for Parliament again until 1705, when he was returned for Boroughbridge as a nominee of the Duke of Newcastle". Following the election, Lord Sunderland "classed Peyton as 'honest' and a gain for the Whigs, while another analysis of the 1705 Parliament noted him as 'Low Church'. Although by affiliation a Whig, Peyton’s parliamentary career was to demonstrate a more consistent adherence to the Court than to the party. He was an active Member from the outset of his career, which included regular appointments to committees dealing with many and varied issues."

The death of Newcastle in July 1711 created problems for Peyton and Newcastle's other nominees due to the conflict over the Newcastle estate between the dowager Duchess of Newcastle and the late Duke's nephew and adopted heir, Lord Pelham (himself created the Duke of Newcastle in 1715). Like his friend Robert Monckton, Peyton sided with the Duchess. Though the dowager Duchess reportedly would have put him up at the next election, she was "not in a position to support his candidature at Boroughbridge in 1713. Although Peyton had hoped to stand on the Wilkinson interest as well, pressure from Lord Pelham, who was opposed to Peyton due to the latter's siding with the Duchess in the inheritance dispute, forced Wilkinson to withdraw any offer of support. In the end Peyton did not contest the 1713 election."

Peyton was appointed a Warden of the Mint in April 1708 and removed from office in December 1714 following the death of Queen Anne.

== Personal life ==
On 5 March 1708, Peyton was married to Lady Catherine Granville (b. 1666). She was the eldest daughter of John Granville, 1st Earl of Bath and his wife, Jane Granville, Countess of Bath (a daughter of Sir Peter Wyche, English ambassador to the Ottoman Empire). Lady Catherine's siblings included Charles Granville, 2nd Earl of Bath; Lady Jane Granville (wife of Sir William Leveson-Gower, 4th Baronet); Lady Grace Granville (wife of George Carteret, 1st Baron Carteret); and John Granville, 1st Baron Granville of Potheridge. His wife inherited all of her father's jewels and 10,000l. In his will, Craven Peyton left inheritance to two sons, Craven Peyton the oldest and Henry Peyton. His wife, The Honorable Lady Catherine Granville, predeceased him. Peyton "died in obscurity" on 25 December 1738, aged 75, at Nutfield, Surrey.

Parliament of England
Preceded by Sir Brian Stapylton, Bt; Sir Henry Goodricke, Bt	Member of Parliament for Boroughbridge; 1705–1707; With: John Stapylton	Succeeded by Parliament of Great Britain
Parliament of Great Britain
Preceded by Parliament of England	Member of Parliament for Boroughbridge; 1707–1718; With: Sir Brian Stapylton, Bt	Succeeded by Sir Brian Stapylton, Bt; Edmund Dunch
