= John Stapylton =

English landowner and Tory politician

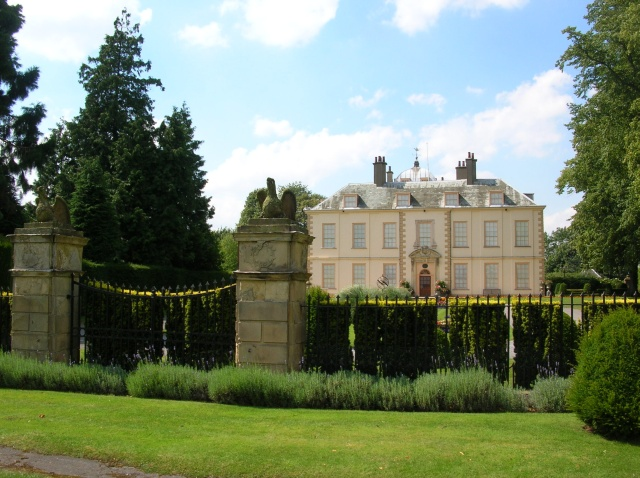
Myton Hall

Sir John Stapylton, 3rd Baronet (c. 1683 – 24 October 1733), of Myton in Yorkshire, was an English landowner and Tory politician who sat in the House of Commons from 1705 to 1708.

Stapylton was the eldest son of Sir Brian Stapylton, MP and his wife Anne Kaye, daughter of Sir John Kaye, 2nd Baronet. He matriculated at St Edmund Hall, Oxford on 12 June 1702, aged 18. In or before 1706, he married Mary Sandys, daughter of Francis Sandys of Scorby.

At the 1705 English general election, Stapylton was returned as Member of Parliament for Boroughbridge, which his father had represented for twelve of the previous fifteen years. He served only three years as MP before being once more supplanted by his father at the 1708 British general election. He was defeated when he stood at Boroughbridge at a by-election in 1718. Following his father's death on 23 November 1727, he succeeded to the baronetcy. He was going to be adopted as Tory candidate for Yorkshire for the 1734 general election. However, on the way to the meeting he was killed by a fall from his horse on 24 October 1733 and his son was selected to replace him.

Stapylton had a number of children, including:

- Sir Miles Stapylton, 4th Baronet (c. 1708–1752), whose only child was a daughter
- Sir Brian Stapylton, 5th Baronet (c. 1712–1772), who died unmarried
- Sir John Stapylton, 6th Baronet (c. 1718–1785), who died unmarried
- Sir Martin Stapylton, 7th Baronet (c. 1723–1801), to whose son the baronetcy eventually passed
- Anne Stapylton

also Francis, Henry, Robert and Christopher, Mary, Elizabeth, Diana and Penelope. Each of his four eldest sons succeeded to the baronetcy in turn.

Parliament of England
Parliament of Great Britain
Preceded by Sir Henry Goodricke, Bt; Sir Brian Stapylton, Bt	Member of Parliament for Boroughbridge; 1705–1708; With: Craven Peyton	Succeeded by Craven Peyton; Sir Brian Stapylton, Bt
Baronetage of England
Preceded by Brian Stapylton	Baronet (of Myton); 1727–1733	Succeeded by Miles Stapylton
