= Myton-on-Swale =

Village and civil parish in North Yorkshire, England

Coordinates: 54°05′36″N 1°19′53″W

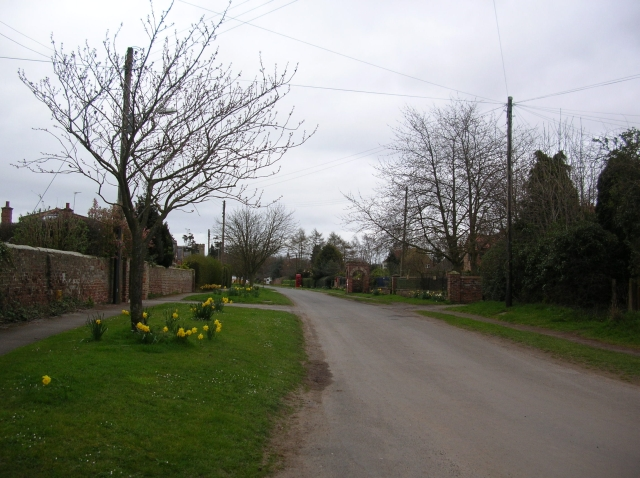
- Myton-on-Swale

- Location within North Yorkshire
- Population: 152
- OS grid reference: SE439666
- Civil parish: Myton-on-Swale
- Unitary authority: North Yorkshire
- Ceremonial county: North Yorkshire
- Region: Yorkshire and the Humber
- Country: England
- Sovereign state: United Kingdom
- Post town: YORK
- Postcode district: YO61
- Police: North Yorkshire
- Fire: North Yorkshire
- Ambulance: Yorkshire
- UK Parliament: Thirsk and Malton

Myton-on-Swale is a village and civil parish in North Yorkshire, England. It is about 3 miles (5 kilometres) east of Boroughbridge and on the River Swale.

== History ==
The village is mentioned in the Domesday Book as Mitune in the Bulford hundred. Prior to the Norman invasion, the manor was split between Ligulf, Gospatric and Alverle. After 1086, the manor was the possession of Robert de Mortain, who tenanted some of the land to Niel Fossard and some to Robert de Stutevil. Eventually part of the manor passed to the Mowbray family. In 1294 the manor was granted to St Mary's Abbey in York until its dissolution on 1539. Afterwards it was granted to Lord Burghley and John Fortescue, and eventually was sold to the Stapyltons.

The Battle of Myton was fought opposite the village on the north bank of the Swale on 20 September 1319 between local levies, led by William Melton, Archbishop of York, and Scots raiders led by James Douglas and Thomas Randolph. The Yorkshiremen, with their backs to the river, were routed with heavy losses including many who drowned in the Swale.

== Governance ==
The village lies within the Thirsk and Malton Parliamentary constituency. It also lies within the Helperby ward and the Easingwold electoral division of North Yorkshire Council. From 1974 to 2023 it was part of the Hambleton District.

== Geography ==
The nearest settlements are Lower Dunsforth 1 mile (1.5 kilometres) to the south; Tholthorpe 2 1/4 mi (3.6 km) to the east; Aldborough 2 mi (3 km) to the west and Helperby 2 1/8 mi (3.4 km) to the north. The village lies directly on the south bank of the River Swale close to its confluence with the River Ure.

The 1881 UK Census recorded the population as 189. The 2001 UK Census recorded the population as 154, of which 114 were over sixteen years old and of these, 72 were in employment. There were 62 dwellings of which 24 were detached.

== Religion ==
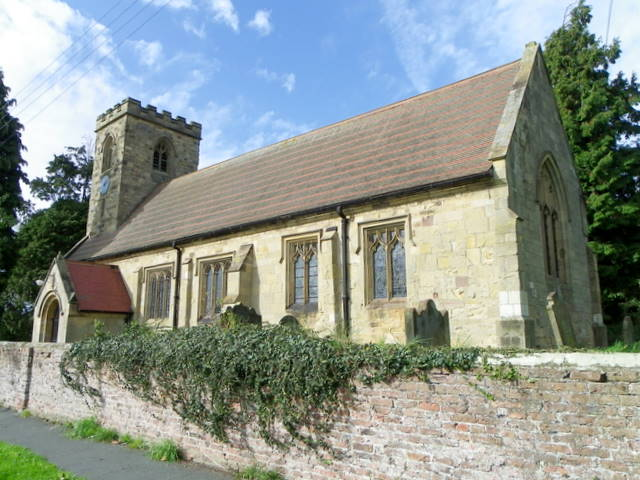
Parish Church of St Mary

St Mary's Church, Myton-on-Swale is a Grade II* listed building built in the 13th century, with restorations in the 15th and 19th centuries. In 1820, the Stapylton family had the remains of Robert de Mowbray transferred from Byland Abbey to be interred at the church. They were returned later in the 19th century.

== Notable buildings ==
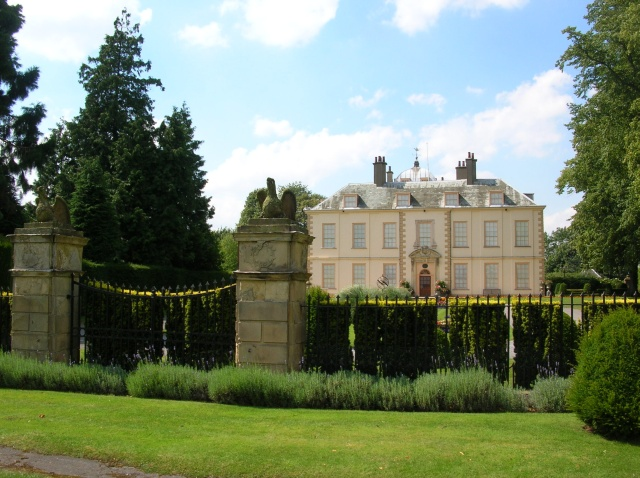
Myton Hall

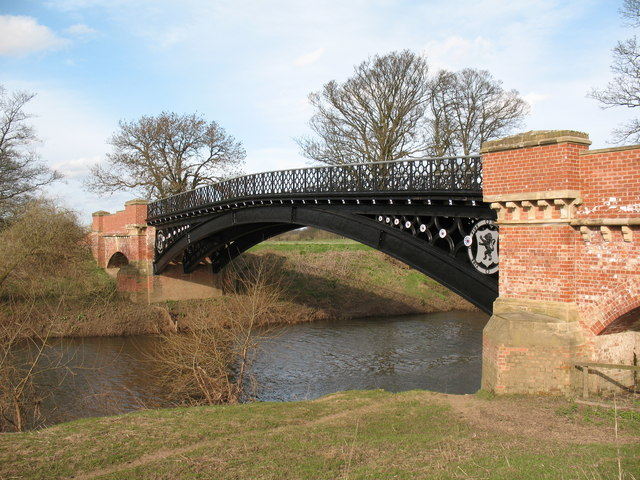
Myton Bridge

Myton Hall is a Grade I Listed Building and was the seat of the Stapylton family from around 1693, though it may be slightly earlier, until 1933. The family date back beyond the Norman Conquest, having previously held lands around Stapleton-on-Tees.

To the east of Myton Hall are the gate piers, wall and railings to the estate which have also been assessed as worthy of Grade I Listing.

In addition to the above and the church, there are two other Grade II Listed Buildings, including Myton Bridge, built by the Stapylton family in 1868 as a toll bridge that replaced the ferry and previous bridge.

== Notable people ==
The Stapylton family have been in residence at Myton Hall since the 17th century. The following lords of the manor of Myton are of note:

- Sir Bryan Stapylton (1657–1727), MP for Aldborough (1679) and MP for Boroughbridge (1690–1715). Also Sheriff of Yorkshire (1683–4).
- Sir John Stapylton (1683–1733), MP for Boroughbridge (1705–8).

The village was home to Sir Ken Morrison CBE (20 October 1931 – February 2017) who was the executive chairman of Wm Morrison Supermarkets plc, the supermarket group. He held the office of President of Wm Morrison Supermarkets plc.
