= Conyers Darcy, 7th Baron Darcy de Knayth =

British noble

Conyers Darcy, 1st Baron Darcy of Meinhill, 7th Baron Darcy de Knayth and 4th Baron Conyers (August 1570 – 3 March 1653) was an English noble and father of the 1st Earl of Holderness.

== Personal life ==
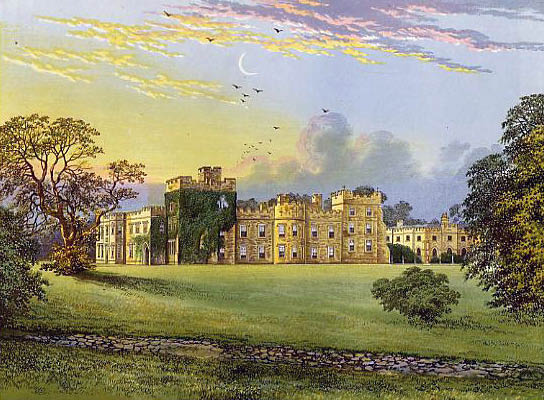
Hornby Castle c.1880

Conyers Darcy was the son of Thomas Darcy and Elizabeth Conyers and grandson of John Conyers, 3rd Baron Conyers. He was educated at St Peter's School, York. He inherited Hornby Castle, North Yorkshire and married Dorothy Belasyse, daughter of Sir Henry Belasyse, 1st Baronet and his wife Ursula. They had six sons and seven daughters. The eldest son to outlive his father was Conyers Darcy; later The Hon. Conyers Darcy.

At the time of the Bishops' Wars, Darcy was Colonel of the Richmondshire Trained Band.

== Titles ==
Darcy became 1st Baron Darcy of Meinhill in 1641, with his wife thus becoming Lady Darcy and his son The Hon. Conyers Darcy. At this time, the monarch also terminated the abeyance of the title Baron Darcy de Knayth which had been in force since the 6th Baron's death in 1418; and the title Baron Conyers which had been in abeyance since the 3rd Baron's death in 1557.

Peerage of England
Abeyant	Baron Darcy de Knayth; Baron Conyers; 1641–1653	Succeeded by Conyers Darcy
