= Goodricke National Chess Academy =

Chess academy in India

Goodricke National Chess Academy is a chess training facility in Kolkata, India. It is run by the Alekhine Chess Club at Gorky Sadan, Kolkata.

The club has fostered a number of youth talent including Diptayan Ghosh (winner, under-10 Asian Chess, Turkey) and Sayantan Das (World Youth Chess Championship U-12 boys, 2008). Earlier protegees include Grandmaster Surya Shekhar Ganguly, Chanda Sandipan, Neelotpal Das and Woman Grandmaster Nisha Mohota.
