= Conyers Darcy, 1st Earl of Holderness =

British noble

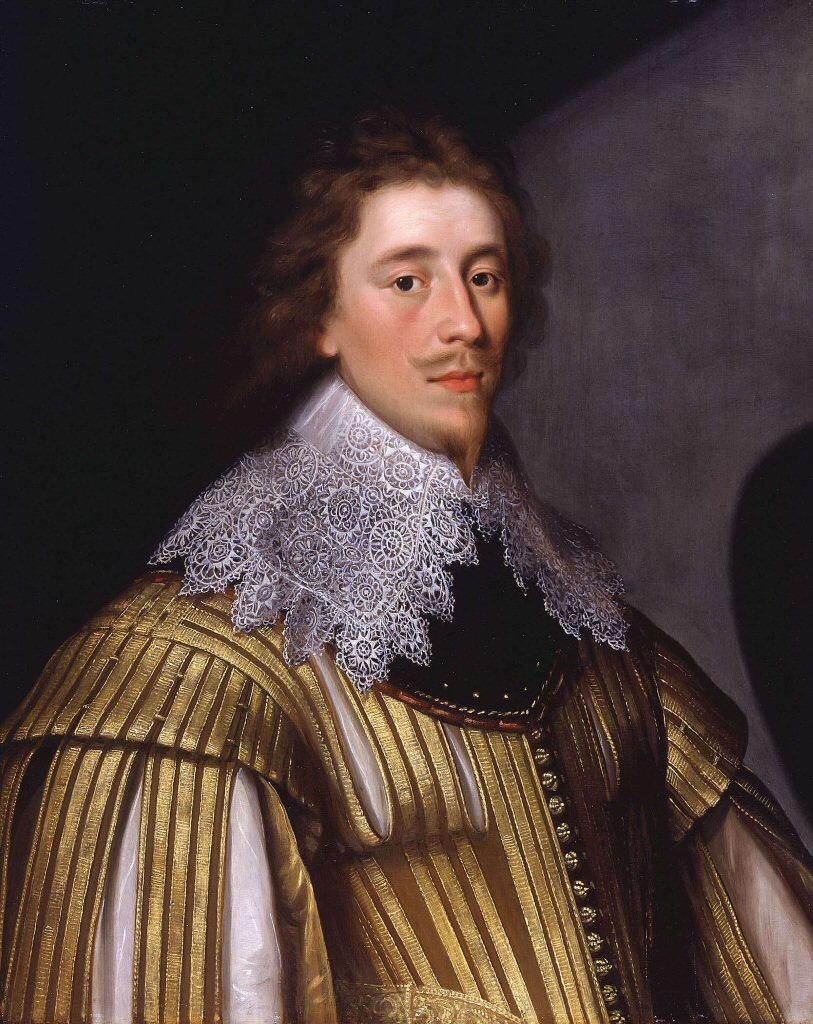
Conyers Darcy by Johannes Priwitzer, ca. 1630

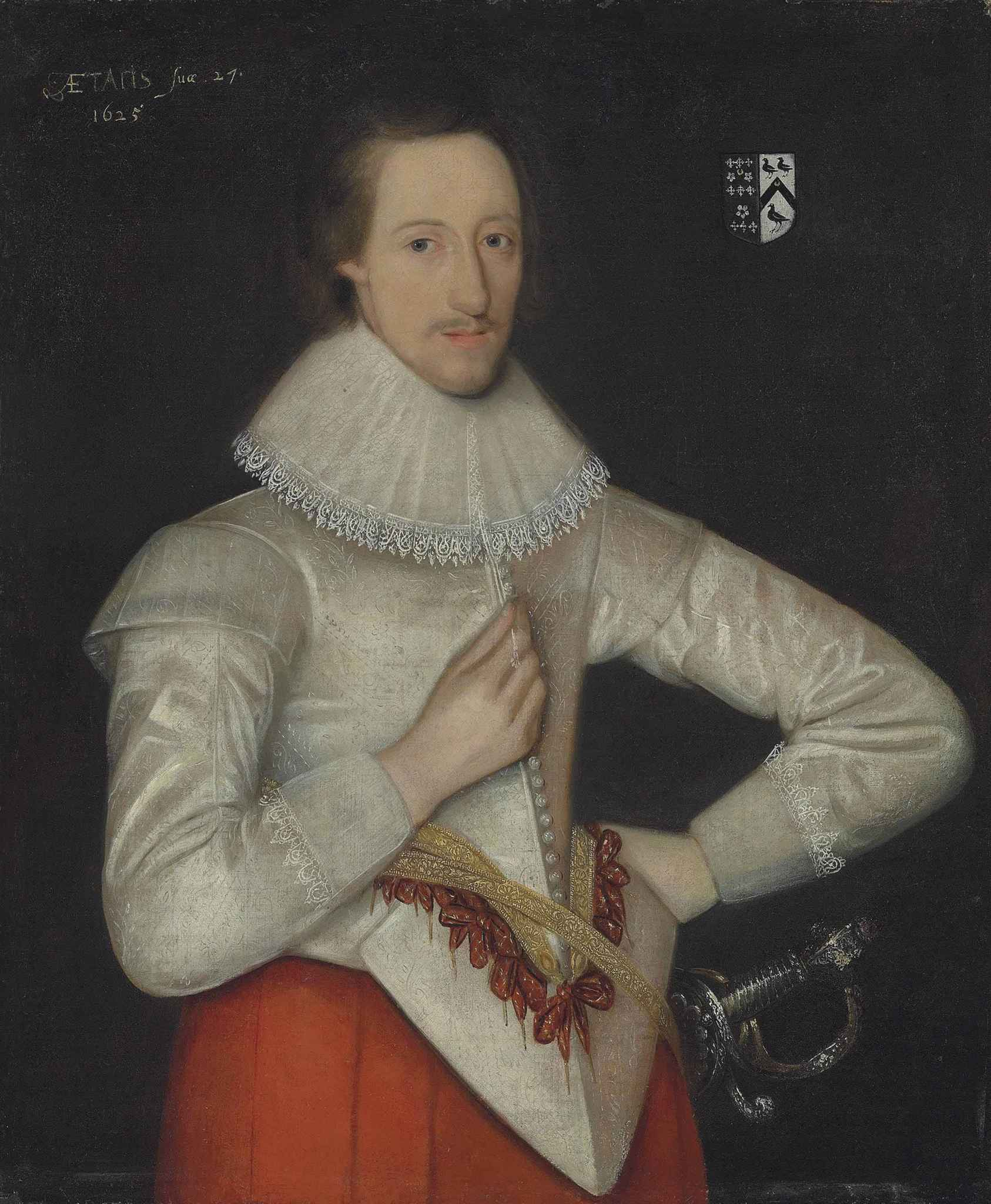
Conyers Darcy in 1625, aged 27. Arms: Azure semée of cross crosslets and three cinquefoils argent (Darcy) impaling Argent, a chevron sable between three rooks proper (Rokeby, canting arms for his wife)

Conyers Darcy, 1st Earl of Holderness (24 January 1598/1599 – 14 June 1689) was an English noble; created Earl of Holderness in 1682.

== Personal life ==
Darcy was born the son of Conyers Darcy, 7th Baron Darcy de Knayth and Dorothy Belasyse. He was baptised on 24 Jan 1598/1599 at Kirkby Fleetham, co York (IGI Batch P015071 "Parish register transcripts, 1591-1812" Church of England. Parish Church of Kirkby-Fleetham, Yorkshire).

He married Grace Rokeby, daughter of Thomas Rokeby, on 14 October 1616. He succeeded to the titles of Baron Darcy de Knayth, Baron Conyers and Baron Darcy of Meinhill upon his father's death in 1654. He was created 1st Earl of Holderness on 5 December 1682.

Lord Holderness had two children:

- Conyers Darcy, 2nd Earl of Holderness (c. 1621/1622-13 December 1692)
- Grace Darcy (c. 1633–1658); married Sir John Legard, 1st Baronet

Peerage of England
New creation	Earl of Holderness; 1682–1689	Succeeded by Conyers Darcy
Preceded by Conyers Darcy	Baron Darcy de Knayth; 1653–1689	Succeeded by Conyers Darcy
Preceded by Conyers Darcy	Baron Conyers; 1653–1680	Succeeded by Conyers Darcy
