= Sir Henry Goodricke, 2nd Baronet =

English politician and diplomat

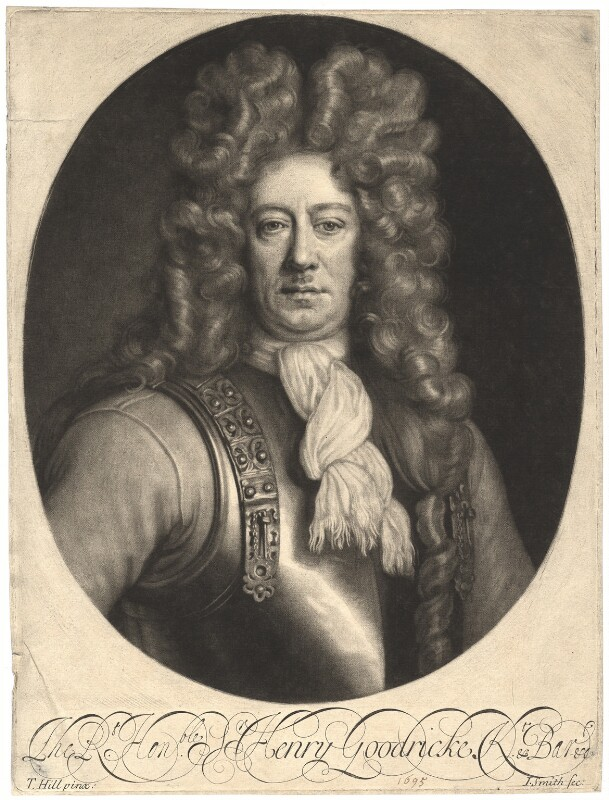
A 1695 mezzotint of Goodricke

Sir Henry Goodricke, 2nd Baronet (c. 1642 – c. 1705) was an English politician and diplomat who served as Lieutenant-General of the Ordnance from 1689 to 1702. The son of Sir John Goodricke, 1st Baronet, he succeeded to his father's baronetcy in 1670. Goodricke also inherited the family estate of Ribston Hall in North Yorkshire and in 1674 replaced it with a new stately home.

He sat in the House of Commons of England from 1673 to 1679, when he began serving as the English ambassador to Spain, holding that office until 1683. Towards the end of his tenure, Charles II of Spain put Goodricke under house arrest in a Hieronymite convent outside Madrid in reaction to what Spain deemed insuffient anti-piracy efforts in the South Seas on the part of the English Crown. Goodricke managed to escape and returned home in February 1683 to sit in Parliament once again from 1683 to 1705. During his parliamentary career, he consistently represented the parliamentary constituency of Boroughbridge.

During the Glorious Revolution of 1688, he acted as the Earl of Danby's lieutenant in Northern England in support of the revolution and was rewarded by the new Williamite regime with the office of Lieutenant-General of the Ordnance, a post which he held until 1702. Goodricke would die soon after in 1705.

Parliament of England
Preceded by Sir Richard Mauleverer, Bt; Robert Long	Member of Parliament for Boroughbridge; 1673–1679; With: Sir Richard Mauleverer, Bt 1673–1675; Sir Michael Warton 1675–1679; Sir Thomas Mauleverer, Bt 1679	Succeeded by Sir John Brookes, Bt; Sir Thomas Mauleverer, Bt
Preceded by Sir John Brookes, Bt; Sir Thomas Mauleverer, Bt	Member of Parliament for Boroughbridge; 1683–1705; With: Sir Thomas Mauleverer, Bt 1685–1689; Christopher Vane 1689–1690; Sir Brian Stapylton, Bt 1690–1695; Thomas Harrison 1695–1698; Sir Brian Stapylton, Bt 1698–1705	Succeeded by John Stapylton; Craven Peyton
Diplomatic posts
Preceded by Ignatius White	English Ambassador to Spain; 1679–1683	Succeeded by Peter Lefett
Political offices
Preceded by Sir Henry Tichborne, Bt	Lieutenant-General of the Ordnance; 1689–1702	Succeeded by The Lord Granville
Baronetage of England
Preceded by John Goodricke	Baronet (of Ribston, Yorkshire); 1670–1705	Succeeded by John Goodricke
