= Sir John Goodricke, 1st Baronet =

English landowner and politician

Sir John Goodricke, 1st Baronet (20 April 1617 – November 1670) was an English landowner and politician who sat in the House of Commons from 1661 to 1670. He supported the Royalist cause in the English Civil War.

== Life ==
Goodricke was the son of Sir Henry Goodricke of Ribston Hall, Yorkshire and his wife Jane Savile, daughter of Sir John Savile, of Methley, (1545–1607), Baron of the Exchequer. Though he is said to have been born in 1617 he was baptised at St Mary's York on 31 August 1620. He matriculated at Jesus College, Cambridge in 1633. After then studying at Aberdeen, he then travelled in France in the later 1630s.

Goodricke succeeded his father on 22 July 1641, and was created a baronet on 14 August 1641. During the Civil Wars he supported the king and suffered in the Royal cause. He was imprisoned at Manchester and later in the Tower of London and was fined £1,508, (or £1,200, with £40 a year) on 23 November 1646.

In 1661, Goodricke was elected Member of Parliament for Yorkshire in the Cavalier Parliament and sat until his death in 1670.

Goodricke married firstly Katharine Norcliffe, daughter of Stephen Norcliffe, of York, at Trinity, Micklegate, York, on 7 October 1641. He married secondly before 1665, Elizabeth, Viscountess Fairfax of Elmley, daughter of Alexander Smith, of Stutton, Suffolk.

Parliament of England
Preceded by The Lord Fairfax of Cameron; Sir John Dawnay	Member of Parliament for Yorkshire; 1661–1670; With: Conyers Darcy	Succeeded by Conyers Darcy; Sir Thomas Slingsby, 2nd Baronet
Baronetage of England
New creation	Baronet (of Ribston); 1641–1670	Succeeded by Henry Goodricke
