= Goodricke baronets =

Extinct baronetcy in the Baronetage of England

The Baronetcy of Goodricke of Ribston was created in the Baronetage of England by King Charles I on 14 August 1641 for his loyal supporter John Goodricke of Ribston, Yorkshire. He represented Yorkshire in the Cavalier Parliament from 1661 to his death.

== Family origins ==
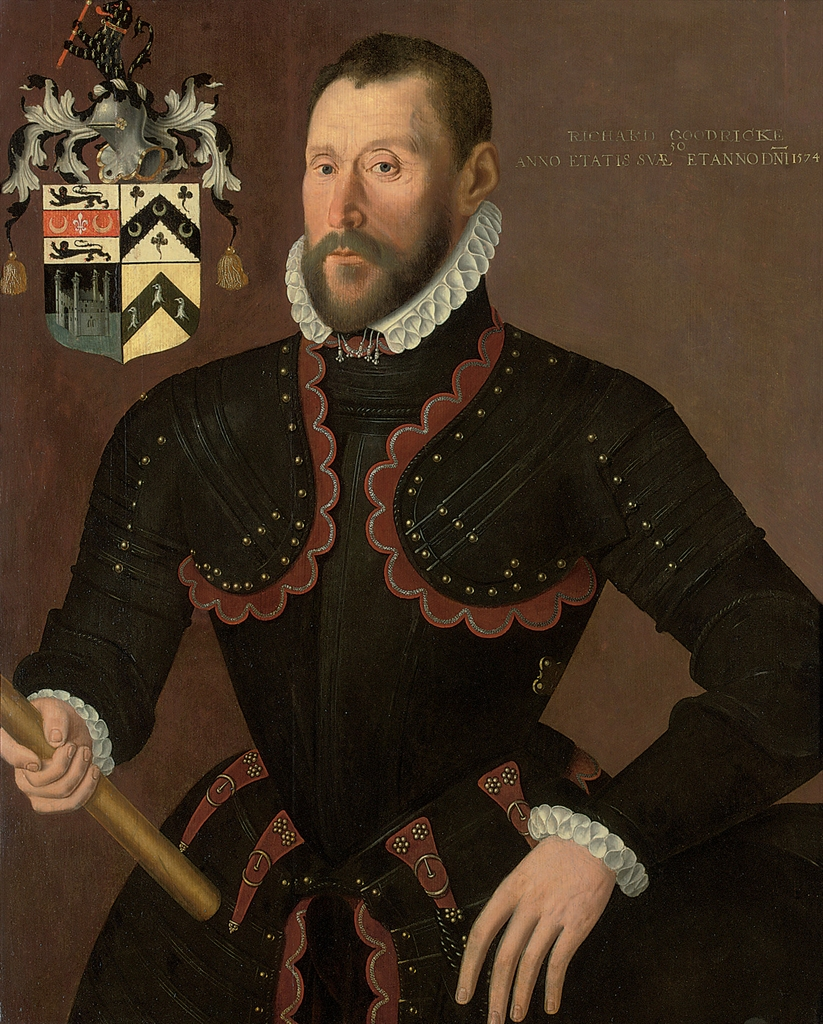
Richard Goodricke (1524–1581/2) in 1574 by an unknown artist.

The family was originally of the county of Somerset, and from there moved into Lincolnshire, upon the marriage of Henry Goodricke, third son of Robert Goodricke, of Nortingley, with a Lincolnshire heiress, Miss Strickford.

In Lincolnshire the Goodrickes flourished for six subsequent generations, until Henry Goodricke, (third and youngest son of William Goodricke, —brother of Thomas Goodricke (1494–1554), Lord Bishop of Ely, and Lord Chancellor of England of King Edward VI— purchased Ribston and other estates, in Yorkshire, from Charles Brandon, 1st Duke of Suffolk in 1542.

Henry Goodricke married Margaret, daughter and co-heiress of Sir Christopher Lawson, knt. of London, and dying in 1556, was succeeded by his eldest son:

- Richard Goodricke, of Ribston, in Yorkshire, who was born in 1524. He was High Sheriff of Yorkshire in 1579, and died in 1581. He married Clare, daughter of Richard Norton, of Norton Conyers, in Yorkshire and was succeeded by his eldest son:
- Richard Goodricke, who was born in 1560 and was also High Sheriff of Yorkshire in 1591. He married Meriol, daughter of William, Lord Eure, and dying in 1601, was succeeded by his eldest son:
- who according to John Burke writing in 1844 was Sir John Goodricke, knt. who married Jane, daughter of Sir John Saville, of Methley, in Yorkshire, knt. was succeeded by his son Sir John Goodricke, 1st Baronet;
- but according to Thomas Wotton writing in 1741 the 1st baronet's father had a given name of Henry and not John and give the following details: Sir Henry Goodricke, knt. who was born in 1580 and died in July 1641. He married Jane, the daughter of Sir John Savile of Methley in Yorkshire, knt., one of the Barons of the Exchequer, (and his second wife Mary daughter of John Robison of Ryther, ) who at length was heiress to her brother of the whole blood, Sir Henry Savile, Bart. There were twelve children by this marriage, of which were three daughters, Jane, and Elizabeth, who died unmarried, and Mary, married to Richard Hawksworth, of Hawksworth, in Yorkshire. Esq; and nine sons, but only three survived their father, viz. Sir John, his eldest, at his death. 2. Savile Goodricke, Esq; who died at Vienna, aged 32; and, 3. Sir Francis, who married Hester, the daughter of Peter Warburton, of the Grange, in Cheshire, Esq; but died without issue, in August 1674, at Durham, where he was chancellor.

== Baronetcy ==
John Goodricke of Ribstone Hall (1617–1670), son of Sir John (or Henry) Goodricke and Jane, was created a baronet on 14 August 1641. He supported the Royalist cause during the English Civil War. After the Civil War he sat as a Member of Parliament for the Cavalier Parliament. He was married twice. First to Catharine, daughter and heiress of Stephen Norcliff, esq. by whom he had a son Henry who in 1670 succeeded to the Baronetcy. Sir John second marriage was to Elizabeth, Viscountess-dowager Fairfax, by whom he had another son.

Henry the second Baronet represented Boroughbridge 1673–1705. The fifth Baronet was Member of Parliament for Pontefract 1774–1780 and for Ripon 1782–1789. The seventh Baronet bequeathed in 1833 the Ribston estate to his business partner Francis Lyttelton Holyoake, who sold it in 1836. His successor as eighth Baronet was his distant cousin, a grandson of the fourth Baronet. On his death without issue the Baronetcy was extinct. RICHARD GOODRICKE,(1) was High Sheriff of Yorkshire in 1574. He married Clare or Clara, daughter of Richard Norton, of Norton Conyers, Esquire.

Richard Goodricke was buried at Ribston Hall. His arms, impaling those of his wife, with the supporters, two naked boys and the motto "Reien sen Deiu" (without God nothing) are still on the south wall of the chapel at Ribston.

- In the Inquisition post mortem taken at Wetherby, Co. York, 10 April 1582, after the death of Richard Goodrick Esq., it is stated that he was seised of the manors of Hunsingore and Great Ribston, Walshford, Cattall, Grewelthorpe, Little Ribston, lands in Calthorpe, Plompton, Kippax, and Thorescrosse, etc. and the rectory of Hunsingore and advowson of the church there.
- Also, that he died 8 January 1581\2 and Richard Goodricke, gentleman, is his son and next heir, and aged, at the time of his father's death 22 years and more. Other estates bequeathed to him and his heirs would have reverted to the elder branch of the family.

According to " Flower's Visitation," 1564, Richard Goodricke was "heir by order of Law, by a Covenant made by his father to the said Richard his son," which indicates the probability of a separate deed having been made confirmatory of the testamentary settlement of his estate made by Henry Goodricke.

== Goodricke of Ribston (1641) ==
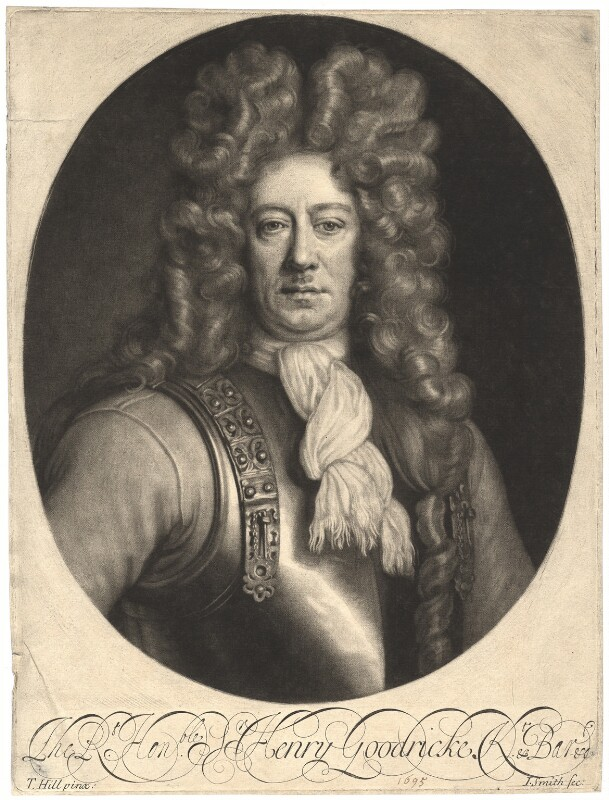
A 1695 mezzotint of Sir Henry Goodricke, 2nd Baronet

- Sir John Goodricke, 1st Baronet (1617–1670)
- Sir Henry Goodricke, 2nd Baronet (1642–1705)
- Sir John Goodricke, 3rd Baronet (1654–1705)
- Sir Henry Goodricke, 4th Baronet (1677–1738)
- Sir John Goodricke, 5th Baronet (1708–1789)
- Sir Henry Goodricke, 6th Baronet (1765–1802)
- Sir Henry James Goodricke, 7th Baronet (1797–1833)
- Sir Thomas Francis Goodricke, 8th Baronet (1762–1839) Extinct on his death

== Other notable members of the Goodricke family ==
- Thomas Goodricke, Lord Chancellor of England
- John Goodricke, Astronomer (brother of 6th Baronet)
