= Ribston Hall =

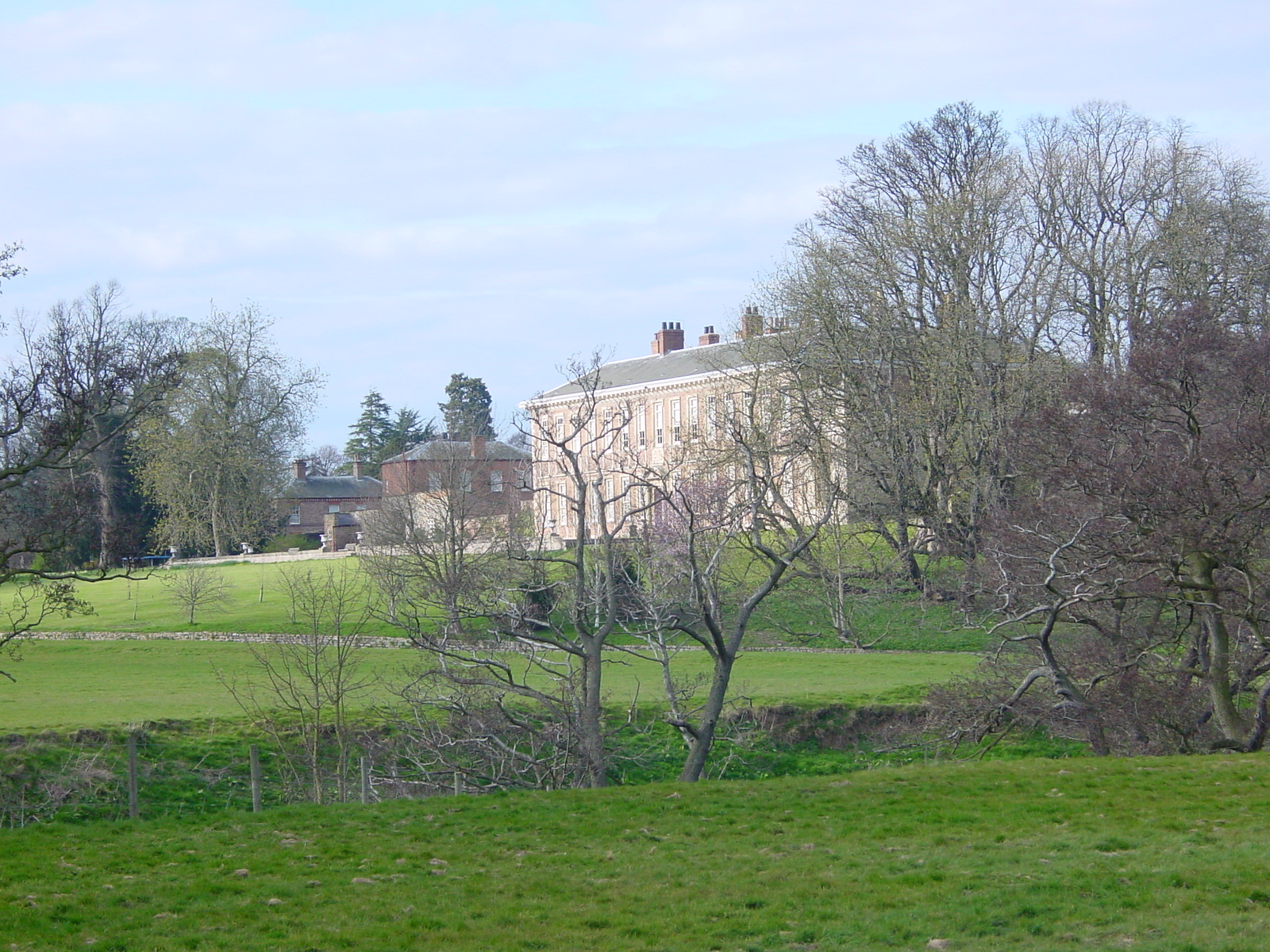

- Location within North Yorkshire
- 53.97855°N 1.40402°W
- Location: Great Ribston, North Yorkshire
- Nearest city: York

History
- Built: 12th century

Listed Building – Grade II*
- Designated: 8 March 1952
- Reference no.: 1149963

National Register of Historic Parks and Gardens
- Designated: 10 May 1984
- Reference no.: 1001071

Ribston Hall is a privately owned 17th-century country mansion situated on the banks of the River Nidd, at Great Ribston, near Knaresborough, North Yorkshire, England. It is a Grade II* listed building.

The two-storey mansion presents an impressive fifteen-bay entrance front to the north east. The adjoining chapel is said to contain traces of 13th-century masonry.

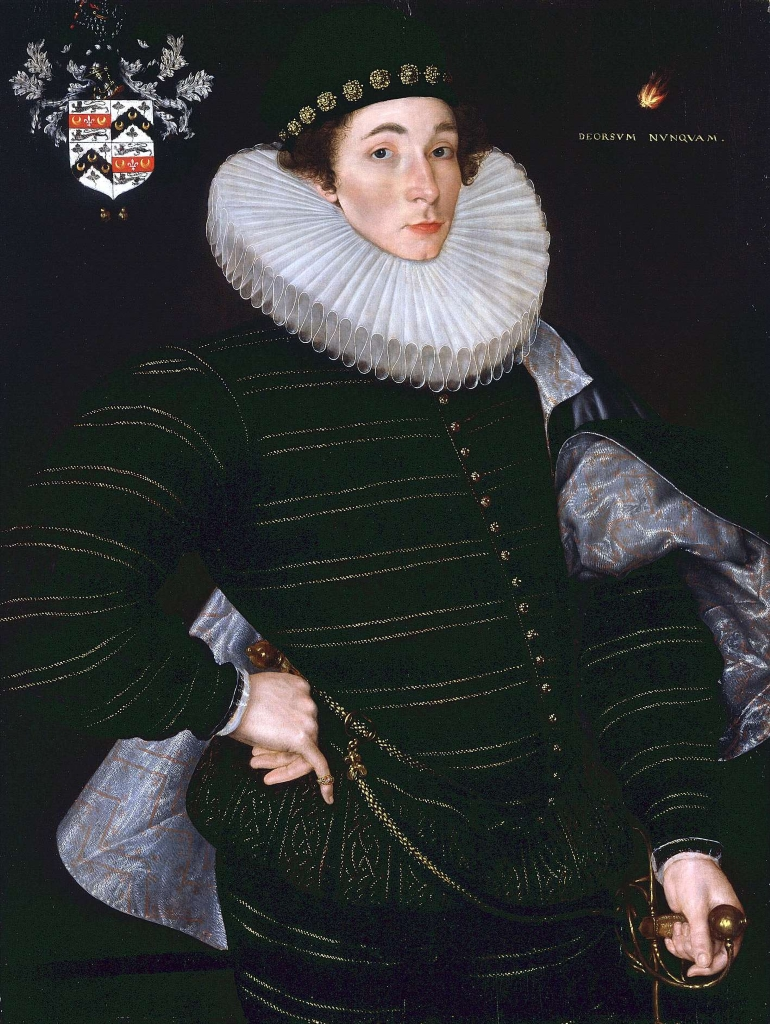
Richard Goodricke of Ribston by Cornelis Ketel 1578

== History ==
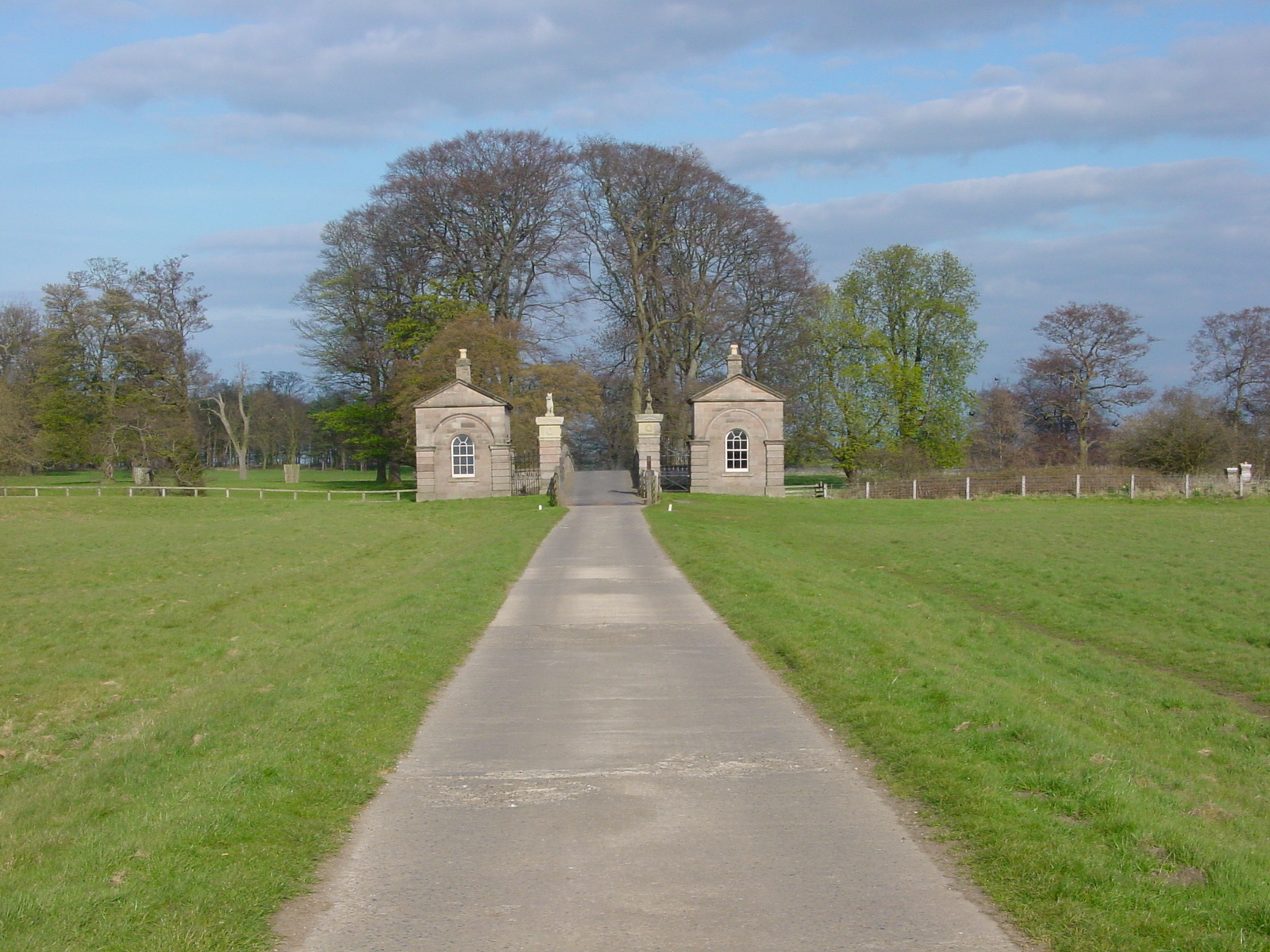
Bridge gatehouses in Ribston Park

The estate at Ribston was granted by Robert de Ros to the Knights Templar in 1217 and passed to the Knights Hospitaller on the dissolution of the Templars in the early 14th century. Following the Dissolution of the Monasteries the property reverted to the Crown and was granted to the Charles Brandon, 1st Duke of Suffolk, who sold it to Henry Goodricke in 1542.

Henry Goodricke was succeeded by his son Richard, who became High Sheriff of Yorkshire for 1579–80, and died in 1581. Richard was succeeded by his own son, Richard, who was High Sheriff of Yorkshire for 1591–92 and died in 1601. He was succeeded in turn by Sir Henry Goodricke whose son John was made Baronet Goodricke in 1641. As a Royalist Sir John suffered in the Civil War, being fined and then imprisoned in the Tower of London, from where he escaped to France. After the Restoration he was elected MP for Yorkshire in 1661, sitting until 1670.

In 1674 Sir Henry Goodricke, 2nd Baronet, the son of Sir John, was MP for Boroughbridge from 1673 to 1679 and from 1683 to his death in 1705. He built the existing house on the remains of the old property. The new Hall was the home of the Goodricke family until the death of the seventh Baronet in 1833, who was unmarried. He bequeathed the estate to Francis Littleton Holyoake of Studley Castle on condition that the latter adopted the Goodricke name. In 1836 Francis Holyoake-Goodricke sold the estate to Joseph Dent, of a well-to-do Lincolnshire family, who laid out the pinetum in the estate c. 1857. He was High Sheriff for 1847.

The mansion remains the Dent family home. The estate is believed to have given its name to the Ribston Pippin apple.

== Architecture ==
=== Hall ===
The hall was built in 1674 and extensively remodelled in the 1770s. It is built of red brick with stone dressings, rusticated quoins, oversailing eaves, a modillion cornice, and hipped Westmorland slate roofs. There are two storeys and 15 bays. In the centre of the south front is a doorway with Corinthian columns and an open scrolled segmental pediment. The windows are sashes in architraves, those in the ground floor with floating cornices, and below the middle window in the upper floor is a decorated panel. At the rear, the outer two bays on each side project as wings. In the centre of the front is a doorway with Tuscan columns and a triangular pediment.

=== St Andrew's Chapel ===
St Andrew's Chapel is attached to the south-east of the hall, and is separately grade II* listed. It was built in 1444, altered in 1700 and again in about 1850. It is built of limestone and sandstone, with sandstone quoins and a flat roof. It consists of a continuous nave and chancel, with a lean-to two-storey porch at the east end of the south wall, containing a doorway with a chamfered surround and a hood mould. At the south end is an embattled parapet, in the corner between the chapel and the hall is a stair tower, and at the west end is a parapet pierced with quatrefoils and two finials. In the west wall are three recesses, one containing a coat of arms. The interior contains 18th-century woodwork, and a font and memorial from about 1700.

=== Stables ===
The stables, built in the mid or late 18th century, are also grade II* listed. They are built of red brick with stone dressings and hipped Westmorland slate roofs. They form four sides around a courtyard, with a free-standing range on each side linked by walls. The main range has a stone plinth, an impost band, and dentilled eaves. There are two storeys and nine bays, the middle three bays projecting under a triangular pediment containing a square plaque with a coat of arms. In the centre is a round-arched entrance flanked by round-headed windows in relieving arches, and in the upper floor are sash windows. On the roof is a cupola with a bell, on a square base, with a clock, a lead dome and a weathervane.

=== Walshford Lodge ===
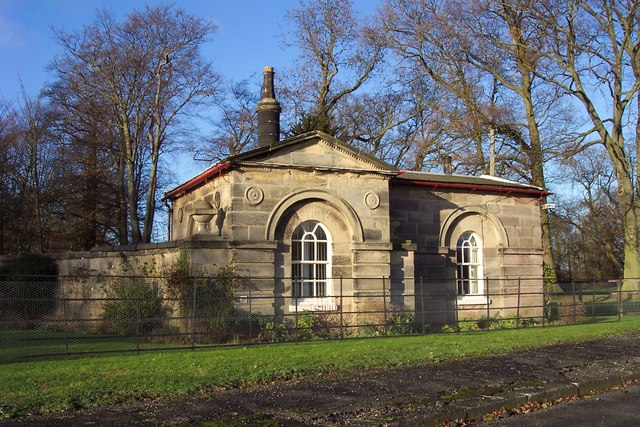
Walshford Lodge

Flanking the entrance to the drive are lodges in stone with Westmorland slate roofs. Both lodges have a single storey, the left lodge has one bay, and the right lodge has two. Curving walls link each lodge to two pairs of gate piers, with banded rustication. The outer pair are about 3 metres (9.8 ft) high, and each is surmounted by a sphinx. The inner pair are about 4 metres (13 ft) high, and each has an entablature with a rosette motif, and a triangular pediment surmounted by a lion with its paw on a globe. The gates and railings are in wrought iron. The lodges are listed together with the gates and railings, also at grade II*.

== See also ==
- Grade II* listed buildings in North Yorkshire (district)
- Listed buildings in Great Ribston with Walshford
