= 1677–1863 Jamaican general elections =

General elections were held in Jamaica under the Old Representative System between the 17th and 19th centuries. The first elections were held in 1677, in which thirty-two members were elected from 15 constituencies. The House of Assembly was abolished in 1865.

== Results ==
=== 1677 ===
| Constituency | Elected members |
|---|---|
| Clarendon | Thomas Sutton, Jonathan Ashurst |
| St. Andrew's | Samuel Barry, John Barnaby |
| St. Ann's | Richard Hemmings, John Gawden |
| St. David's | Thomas Ryves, Thomas Fargor |
| St. Dorothy's | John Colebeck, Theodore Cary |
| St. Elizabeth | Richard Scott, Thomas Raby |
| St. George's | William Nedham, George Philipps |
| St. James' | Richard Guy, Samuel Jenks |
| St. John's | Whitgift Aylemore, Richard Oldfield |
| St. Katherine's | John Bowden, Samuel Bernard, William Bragg |
| St. Mary's | John Fountain, Andrew Orgill |
| St. Thomas | Edward Stanton, Clem. Richardson |
| St. Thomas-in-the-Vale | Fulke Rose, George Nedham |
| Port Royal | William Beeston, Anthony Swimmer, Charles Morgan |
| Vere | Andrew Knight, Andrew Langly |
Source: British History Online
