= George Marshall (disambiguation) =

George C. Marshall (1880–1959) was an American general, Chief of Staff of the United States Army, Secretary of State, President of the American Red Cross, and Secretary of Defense.

George Marshall may also refer to:

- George Marshall (academic), principal of Trevelyan College, University of Durham
- George Marshall (athlete) (1877–?), British runner
- George Marshall (conservationist) (1904–2000), American conservationist and political activist
- George Marshall (Victoria cricketer) (1829–1868), Australian cricketer who played for Victoria
- George Marshall (Tasmania cricketer) (1832–1905), Australian cricketer who played for Tasmania
- George Marshall (New Zealand cricketer) (1863–1907), New Zealand cricketer
- George Marshall (environmentalist) (born 1964), British environmentalist
- George Marshall (footballer, born 1869) (1869–1938), English footballer
- George Marshall (footballer, born 1896) (1896–?), English footballer
- George Marshall (gunner) (1781–1855), chemist, artillery specialist, and gunner in the United States Navy
- George Marshall (MP), member of parliament (MP) for Boroughbridge 1614-1621
- George Alexander Marshall (1851–1899), U.S. representative from Ohio
- George Marshall (director) (1891–1975), actor and director
- George Marshall (philanthropist) (1753–1819), curate in Horsham, England
- George Frederick Leycester Marshall (1843–1934), military officer and naturalist
- George H. Marshall (1916–1984), British educator, campaigner and author
- George Preston Marshall (1896–1969), American football team owner
- George Sidney Marshall (1869–1956), 38th mayor of Columbus, Ohio
- George William Marshall (1839–1905), English officer of arms
- George Marshall (warden) (died 1658), English educational administrator
- George Marshall (Jamaican politician), elected to the House of Assembly of Jamaica in 1820
- G. M. Marshall (1834–1915), Wisconsin state assemblyman

== See also ==
- Marshall Space Flight Center, a major center for NASA named after George C. Marshall
- George C. Marshall Institute, a think-tank based in Washington, D.C.
- George C. Marshall's Dodona Manor, the home of George C. Marshall open as a museum
- George C. Marshall High School (built: 1963), public high school in northern Virginia
- George C. Marshall European Center for Security Studies (founded 1993), an institute for the study of military security
- USS George C. Marshall, a Benjamin Franklin-class ballistic missile submarine
