= ISO 3166-2:JM =

Entry for Jamaica in ISO 3166-2

ISO 3166-2:JM is the entry for Jamaica in ISO 3166-2, part of the ISO 3166 standard published by the International Organization for Standardization (ISO), which defines codes for the names of the principal subdivisions (e.g., provinces or states) of all countries coded in ISO 3166-1.

Currently for Jamaica, ISO 3166-2 codes are defined for 14 parishes.

Each code consists of two parts, separated by a hyphen. The first part is JM, the ISO 3166-1 alpha-2 code of Jamaica. The second part is two digits (01–14). The codes are assigned in the counter-clockwise direction starting from Kingston Parish.

== Current codes ==
Subdivision names are listed as in the ISO 3166-2 standard published by the ISO 3166 Maintenance Agency (ISO 3166/MA).

Click on the button in the header to sort each column.

| Code | Subdivision name (en) |
|---|---|
| JM-13 | Clarendon |
| JM-09 | Hanover |
| JM-01 | Kingston |
| JM-12 | Manchester |
| JM-04 | Portland |
| JM-02 | Saint Andrew |
| JM-06 | Saint Ann |
| JM-14 | Saint Catherine |
| JM-11 | Saint Elizabeth |
| JM-08 | Saint James |
| JM-05 | Saint Mary |
| JM-03 | Saint Thomas |
| JM-07 | Trelawny |
| JM-10 | Westmoreland |

== See also ==
- Subdivisions of Jamaica
- FIPS region codes of Jamaica
