= Moore baronets of Jamaica (1764) =

The Moore baronetcy, of Jamaica in the West Indies, was created in the Baronetage of Great Britain on 28 January 1764 for the colonial administrator Henry Moore. The title recognised his role as lieutenant-governor and military commander in suppressing Tacky's Revolt in Jamaica.

The baronetcy became extinct on the death of the 2nd Baronet in 1780.

== Moore baronets, of Jamaica (1764) ==
- Sir Henry Moore, 1st Baronet (1713–1769)
- Sir John Henry Moore, 2nd Baronet (1756–1780)

== Notes ==
Baronetage of Great Britain
Preceded by Rodney baronets	Moore baronets of Jamaica; 28 January 1764	Succeeded by Amyand baronets
