= Francis Rose (politician) =

- Born: 1650s Mickleton, England
- Died: 20 November 1720
- Occupations: Planter and politician
- Known for: Speaker of the House of Assembly of Jamaica; President of the Council of Jamaica
- Relatives: Brother: William Rose, apothecary

Francis Rose (1650s – 20 November 1720) was a plantation owner in Jamaica. He was active in the politics of the island and was elected to serve in the House of Assembly of Jamaica multiple times, becoming speaker in 1702, and later president of the Council of Jamaica.

== Early life and family ==
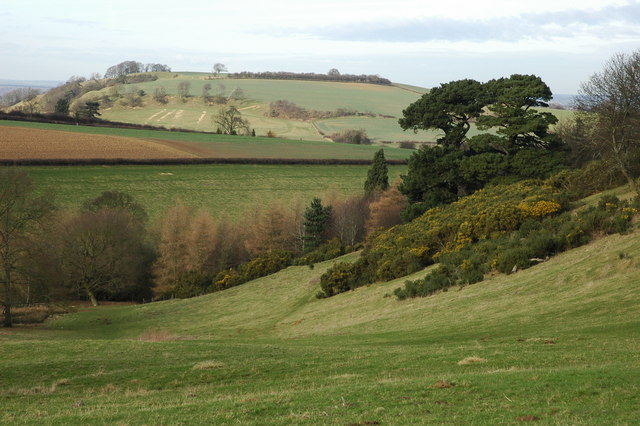
Near Mickleton, Gloucestershire

Francis Rose was born around 1653–1656 in Mickleton, Gloucestershire, to the reverend Thomas Rose and his wife Francesse Rose née Fisher. His brothers Thomas (1649–1679) and the physician Fulke (1644 – c. 1694) were resident in Jamaica, his brother John was a merchant in London, and William was an apothecary who gave his name to the legal case of Rose v Royal College of Physicians (1701–1703).

In 1688, Fulke Rose, with Hans Sloane, was one of the physicians who attended the former privateer Henry Morgan for his various ailments.

Francis Rose married Elizabeth Coxon and they had children, Elizabeth (1683–), Thomas (1689–1724), and Francis.

== Career ==
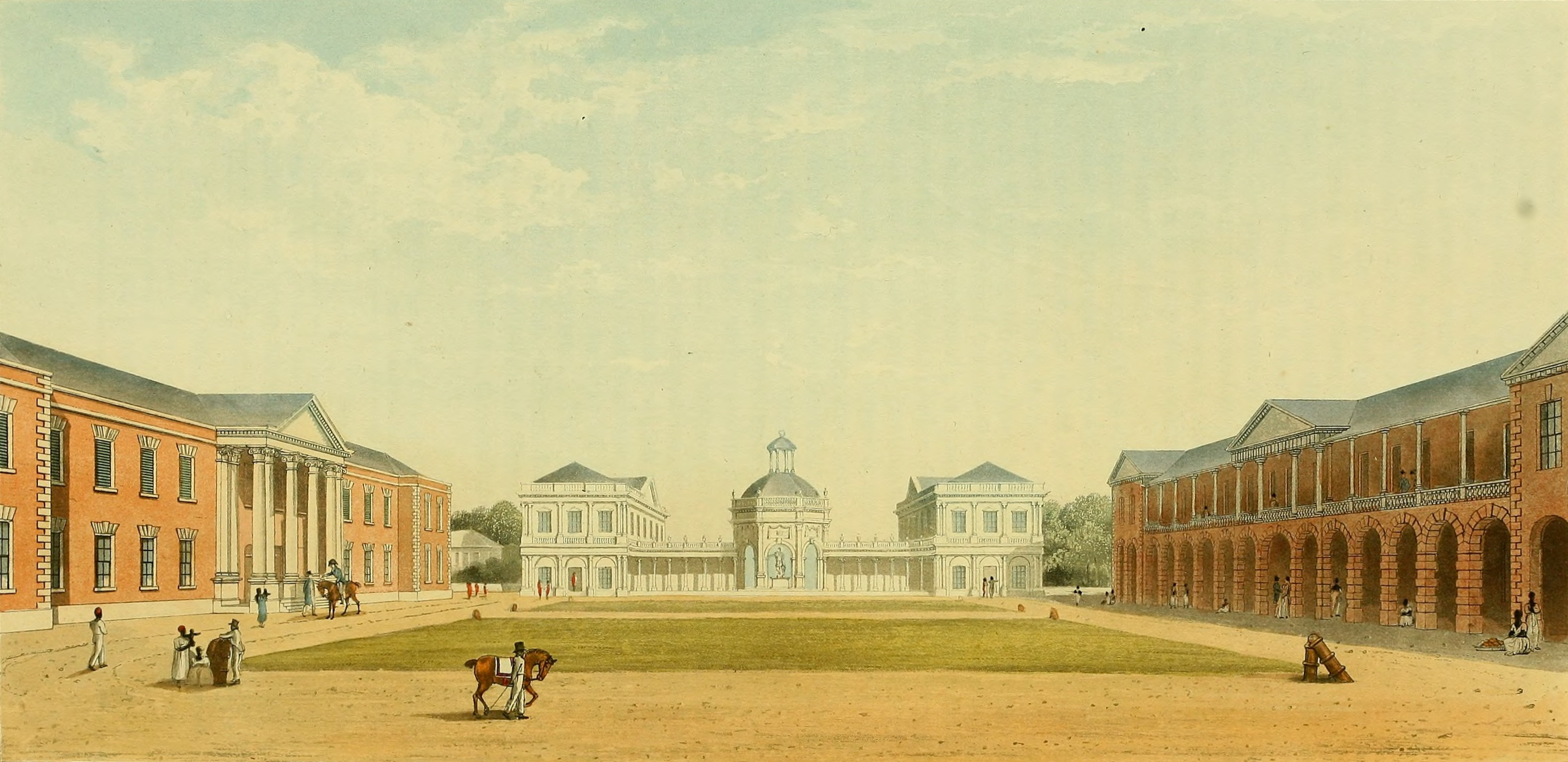
King's Square, St. Jago de la Vega (Spanish Town), 1820–21 from James Hakewill's A Picturesque Tour of the Island of Jamaica (1825). House of Assembly on the right.

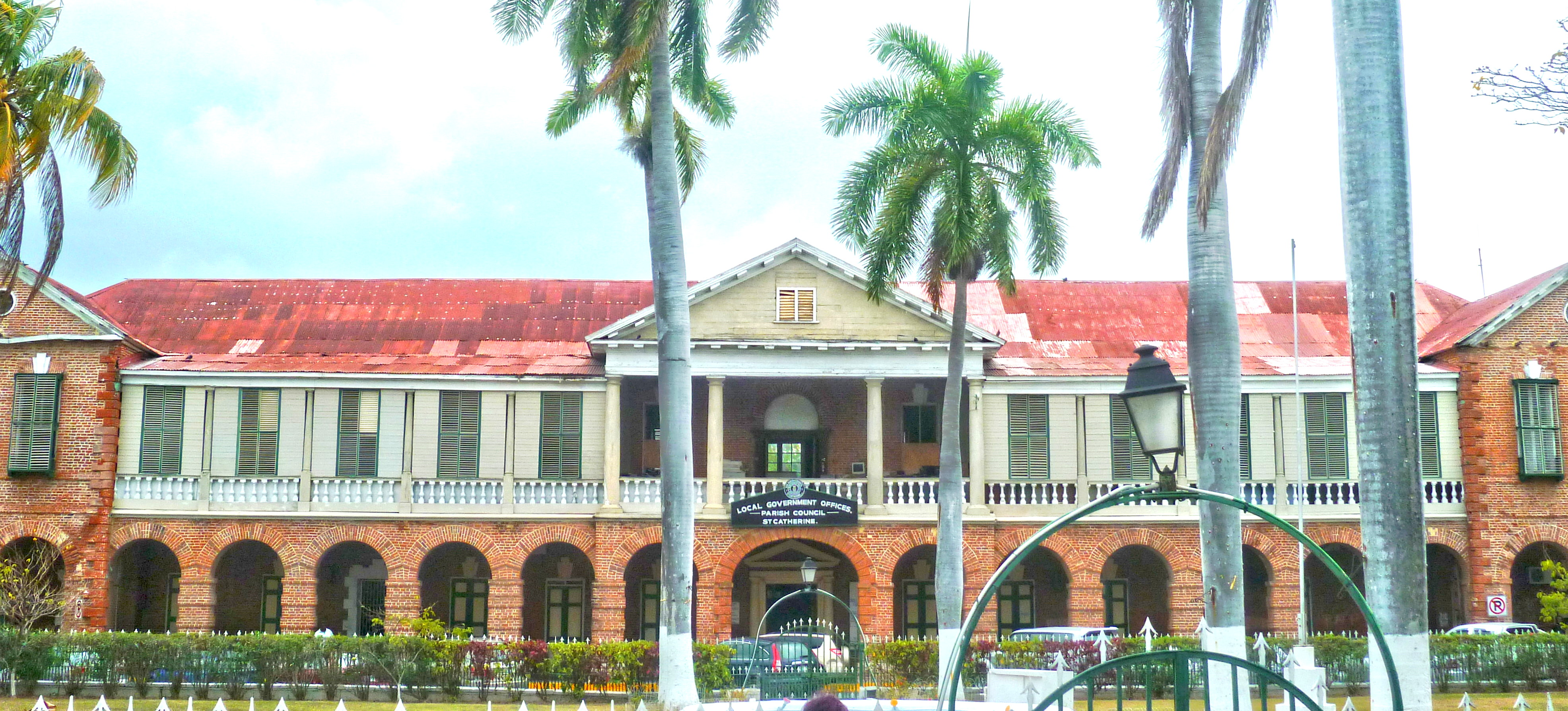
Modern view of the House of Assembly

Rose's plantations included Burton's in Saint Thomas, Bagnall's Thicket (later known as The Decoy), Savanna (Old Works), and Rose Hall (New Works); he also owned two houses in the then capital of Spanish Town and land in Half Way Tree.

He was active in Jamaican politics, representing Saint Thomas-in-the-Vale in the House of Assembly of Jamaica in 1693 and 1698, and the parish of Saint Catherine in assemblies of 1701 and 1702. In 1702 he was elected speaker of the house. He also represented Saint George parish in the assembly and in 1703 joined the Council of Jamaica, subsequently becoming its president, a position he held until his death.

== Death ==
Rose died on 20 November 1720. He was buried at Saint Catherine Parish Church (Spanish Town Cathedral) where a monumental inscription notes his death in his 67th year. Other inscriptions nearby note the burial of his son Thomas and of other family members as well as family connections to Francis Price who served as a captain in the British Army under Venables during the capture of Jamaica from the Spanish in 1655 and Lieutenant Colonel "Rose, also one of the conquerors of that Island, and the scion of an ancient family long settled in the counties of Dorset, and Gloucester."

== See also ==
- List of speakers of the House of Assembly of Jamaica
