= William Stimpson (politician) =

Politician in Jamaica

William Stimpson (died by 1826) was a planter and slave-owner in Jamaica. He owned the Java Plantation in Manchester Parish and had interests in others. He was elected to the House of Assembly of Jamaica in 1820 for the parish of Vere.
