= Aldington George Curphey =

Anglo-Jamaican physician and politician (born 1880)

Aldington George Curphey CBE MC ED
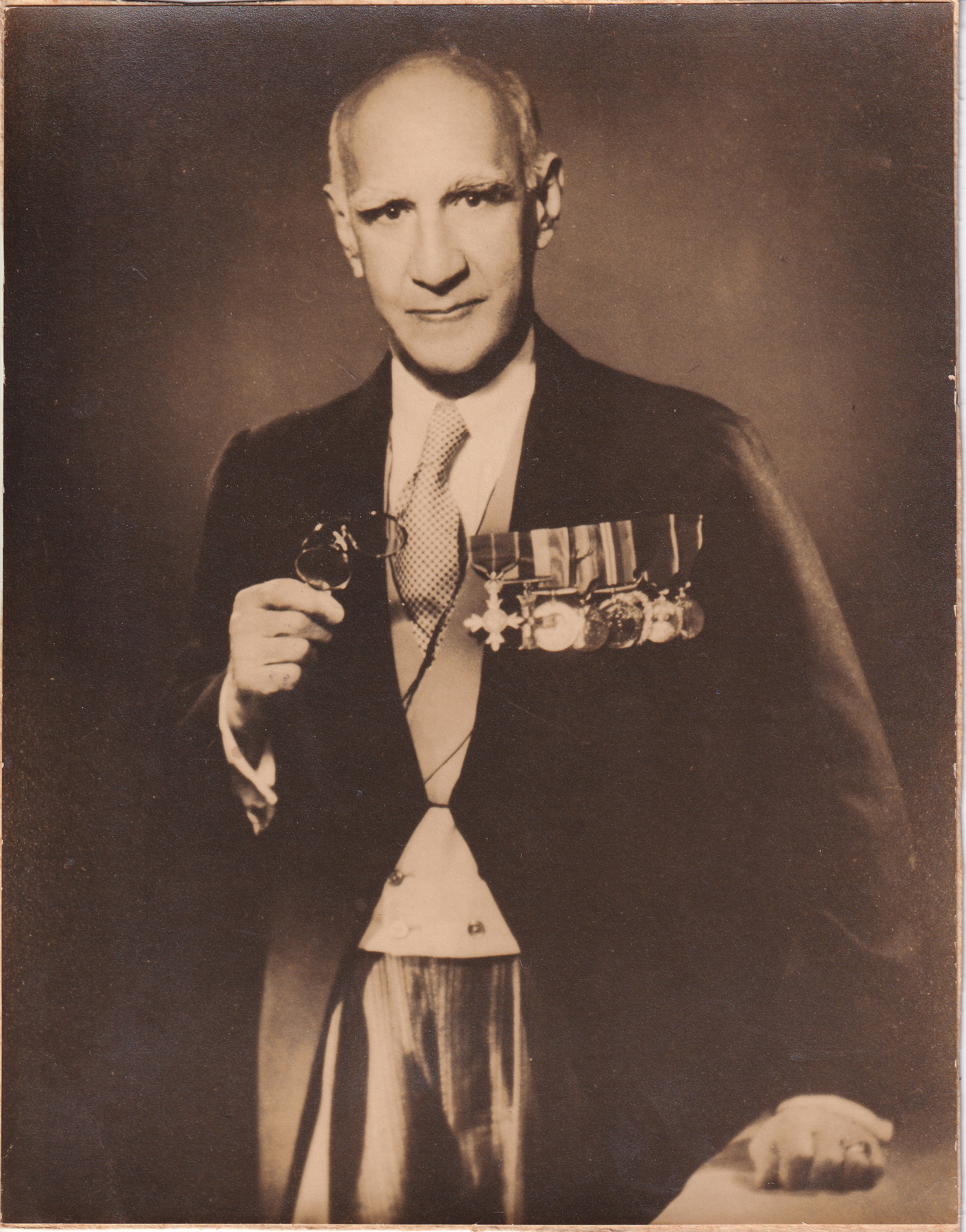
- Born: 24 August 1880; St Andrew parish of Kingston, Colony of Jamaica, British Empire
- Died: 28 November 1958 (aged 78)
- Education: York Castle High School; Queen's University, Canada; Royal College of Physicians of Edinburgh
- Occupations: Surgeon, medical officer and politician

Colonel Sir Aldington George Curphey CBE MC ED (24 August 1880 – 28 November 1958) was an Anglo-Jamaican surgeon, medical officer and politician who served as President of the island's Legislative Council from 1952 to 1958.

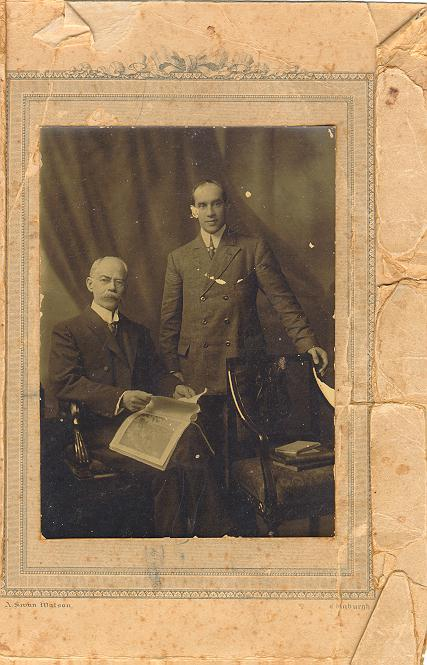
Thomas John Curphey & Son Sir Adlington George Curphey

== Early life and family ==
Aldington George Curphey was born on 24 August 1880 in the St Andrew parish of Kingston, Jamaica, to Thomas John Curphey and his wife Georgiana, née Cowell. His father had earlier emigrated from his native Isle of Man to become a chemist; Curphey's mother was the daughter of an English police officer.

== Career ==
=== Medicine ===
After attending York Castle High School and Wolmer's School, Curphey went to Queen's University, Canada, graduating with his medicine degrees (MD, CM) in 1907, and qualifying as a Licentiate of the Royal College of Physicians of Edinburgh (LRCP Ed), the Royal College of Surgeons of Edinburgh (LRCS Ed) and the Royal Faculty of Physicians and Surgeons (LRFPS) in 1909. He was held a number of posts at Saint Joseph's Hospital in Hamilton, Ontario, and was coroner for Wentworth County, but in 1912 he entered the Jamaica Medical Service to become medical officer for health for Saint Ann Parish; he also began work at Spanish Town Hospital and Lepers' Home. He remained a government medical officer on the island until 1936. In the meantime, Curphey served in the First World War as a medical officer attached to the Jamaica War Contingent; he was commissioned into the Royal Army Medical Corps as a captain, and won the Military Cross. On demobilisation, Curphey set up his own medical practice in Saint Ann. At the onset of the Second World War, Curphey became a senior military medical officer for Jamaica and took the rank of surgeon-major in the Local Forces (he was later made an honorary colonel); from 1944 to 1949 was also welfare officer for the Caribbean Area.

=== Public service ===
Curphey's entry into public service began in 1936 when he was elected to Saint Ann's Parish board. The following year, he became its vice-chairman and in 1944 chairman. In 1945, he became a member of the Jamaican Legislative Council. In 1952, he was elected president of the legislative council, and served in the office until his death. He had been president of the Jamaica branch of the British Medical Association in 1937 and had held a range of other public and philanthropic offices. He was one of the island's representatives at the Coronation of Queen Elizabeth II in London in 1953.

Curphey was appointed a Member of the Order of the British Empire (MBE) in 1944 and promoted to Commander (CBE) in 1952; he was knighted six years later. He died on 28 November 1958, leaving behind his widow, Winifred May née Douët, and their daughter.

== Honours ==

Ribbon	Description	Notes
	Order of the British Empire (CBE)	Commander; Civil Division; 1952 Queen's Birthday Honours List; Member; Military Division; 1944 King's Birthday Honours List
	Knight Bachelor (Kt)	1958 Queen's Birthday Honours List
	Military Cross (MC)	
	British War Medal	
	WWI Victory Medal	With MID Oakleaf
	War Medal 1939–1945	
	Efficiency Decoration (ED)	
	King George VI Coronation Medal	12 May 1937
	Queen Elizabeth II Coronation Medal	2 June 1953
