= Metcalfe Parish, Jamaica =

Metcalfe Parish was one of the historic parishes of Jamaica. It takes its name from Governor Metcalfe. It was in the north side of the island in Middlesex County but was abolished in 1866 when it became part of Saint Mary Parish.
