= Fulke Rose =

British physician and slave-owner

- Born: 10 April 1644; Mickleton, Gloucestershire, England
- Died: buried 29 March 1694 (aged 49); London, England
- Occupation: Land-owner/Slave-owner in Jamaica
- Medical career
- Profession: Physician
- Notable works: Treated Henry Morgan

Fulke Rose (10 April 1644 – c. March 1694) was an English physician and early colonist of Jamaica. He was one of the principal buyers in Jamaica of slaves taken by the Royal African Company and had extensive land-holdings on the island. He continued to practice medicine in Jamaica and with Hans Sloane attended the former privateer Henry Morgan towards the end of Morgan's life.

== Early life and family ==
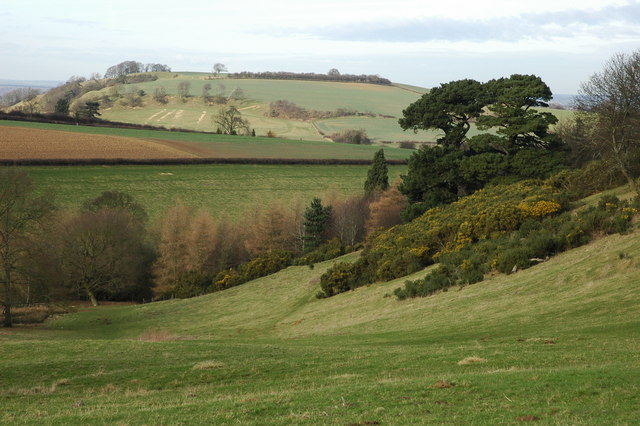
Near Mickleton, Gloucestershire

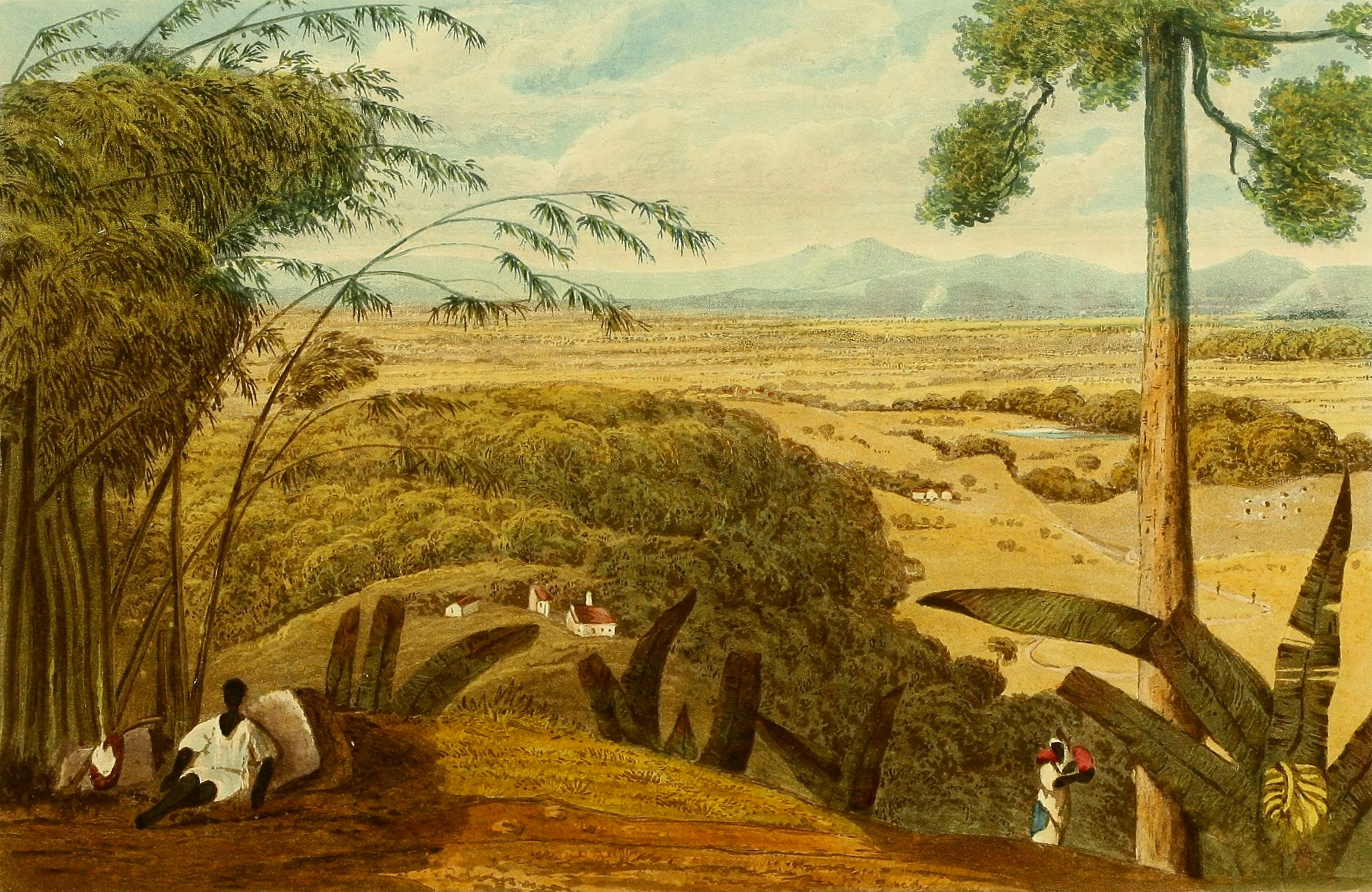
St. Thomas in the Vale from Mount Diablo by James Hakewill from A Picturesque Tour of the Island of Jamaica, 1820s.

Fulke Rose was born 10 April 1644 in Mickleton, Gloucestershire, to the reverend Thomas Rose and his wife Francesse Rose née Fisher. He had brothers Thomas and Francis who were resident in Jamaica, John who was a merchant in London and William who was an apothecary who was one of the parties in Rose v Royal College of Physicians (1701–03). His will of 1693 also mentions sisters Elizabeth Milner and Martha Langley, and a brother Norgrove.

He married Elizabeth Langley, daughter of Alderman John Langley of Cornhill, at Port Royal, Jamaica, on 11 July 1678. Their children included daughters Elizabeth, Anne (Anne Isted), and Mary.

== Career ==
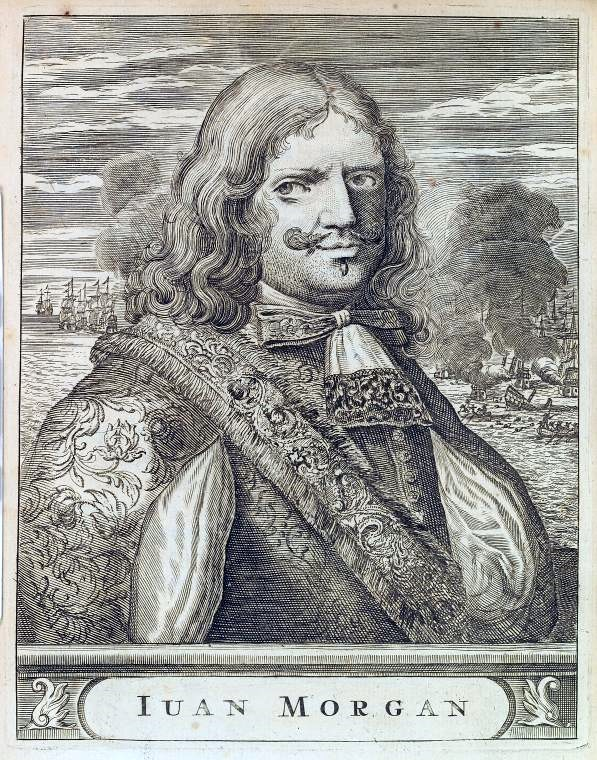
Henry Morgan as imagined in Alexandre Exquemelin's Piratas de la America (1681)

By 1670, Rose was in Jamaica and already owned 380 acres of land in Saint Catherine Parish. At this time, the island was transitioning from an economy based on piracy to one based on agriculture using slaves. In 1684, Rose was described in State Papers as "a surgeon bred, and a very discreet and virtuous man. His plantations render him over 4000£ per annum and his practice about 600£."

He was one of the principal buyers in Jamaica of slaves from the Royal African Company from which he bought 131 persons, of whom 42% came from the Bight of Benin and 32% from the Gold Coast (modern Ghana).

Among the estates and land he owned at the time he drew up his will in 1693 were the Mickleton, Knollis, and Sixteen Mile Walk estates, all in St Thomas in the Vale, the Angells, land at Maggatty called Warrens and Hipperslys, land and houses in the town of St Jago de Laviega (Spanish Town), lands "over the river at the Red Hills" in Saint Catherine Parish, and lands in the north of Jamaica in Saint Mary and Saint George parishes. In England he owned a farm in Oxney, near Deale in Kent, and Nonnington Farm near Canterbury.

Like other prominent colonists and land-owners in Jamaica, he was an officer in the militia. He was also returned, alongside George Nedham, as member for Saint Thomas in the Vale Parish for the House of Assembly of Jamaica in 1677 and was a member of the Legislative Council of Jamaica.

In early 1688, he and Hans Sloane attended the former privateer Henry Morgan for a swollen belly and other ailments that were attributed by his doctors to excessive alcohol and lack of exercise. According to Sloane's account they at first prescribed "Electuary of Cassia, Oil of Juniper, and Cremor. Tart." but that not being completely satisfactory they,

gave him all manner of Diuretics, and easie Purgers we could find in Jamaica, Linseed and Juniper-Berries infus'd in Rhenish-Wine, Milleped. ppd. in Powder, Juniper-water, advis'd him to eat Juniper-Berries, us'd Oil of Scorpion, with Ung. Dialth. outwardly, by which means he recovered again.

Morgan soon went back to his old ways, however, and relapsed. He consulted a number of other doctors who prescribed various treatments but he died in August 1688.

== Death and legacy ==
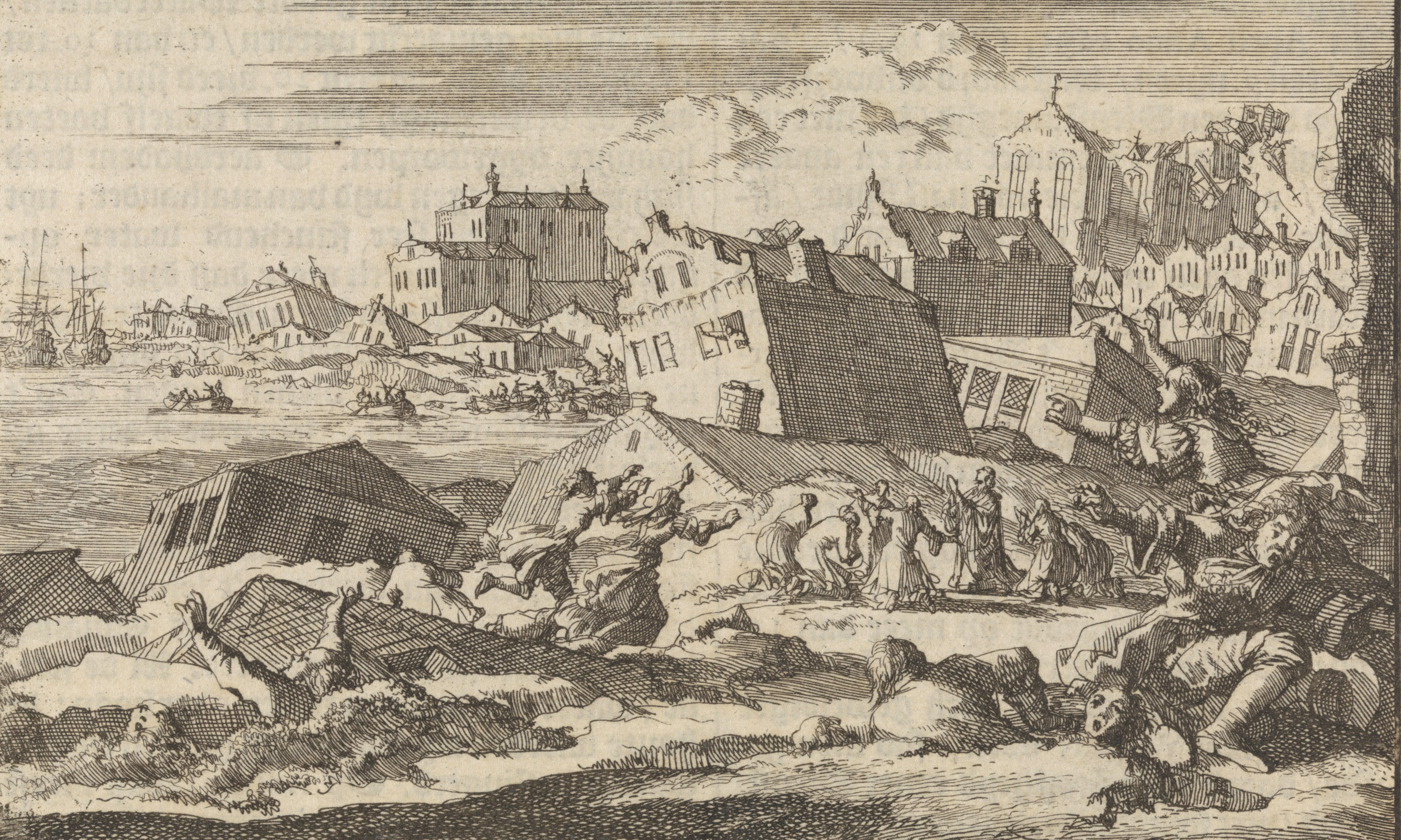
The Port Royal earthquake of 1692 as imagined by Jan Luyken. Published by Pieter van der Aa

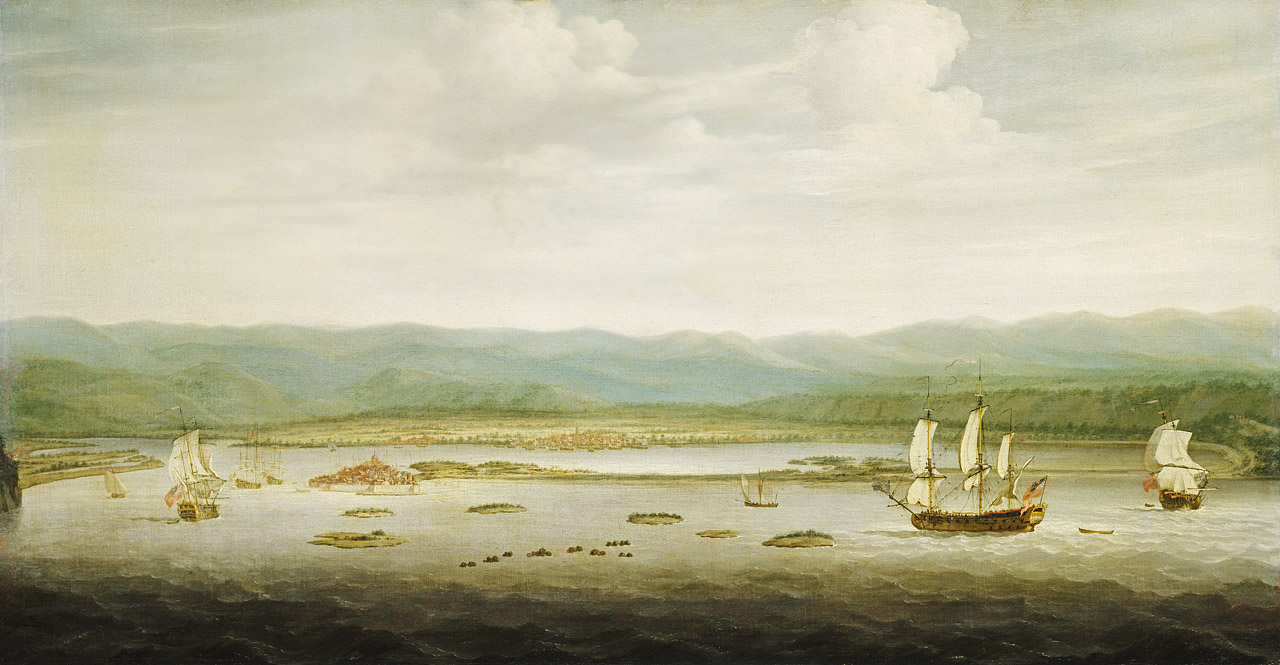
View of Port Royal, Jamaica by Richard Paton. Oil on canvas, 1758. National Maritime Museum, Greenwich, London.

After the Jamaican earthquake of 1692, in which Port Royal was almost completely destroyed, Rose travelled to London. He died in 1694 and was buried at St Peter's church, Cornhill, on 29 March 1694. In 1695, his widow Elizabeth Langley Rose took as her second husband Sir Hans Sloane, meaning that her one-third share of the income from Rose's estates ultimately became available to Sloane who received regular shipments of hogsheads of sugar in the following years.
