= William Shand (politician) =

Politician in Jamaica

William Shand was elected to the House of Assembly of Jamaica in 1820 for the parish of Saint John.
