= Wentworth Bayly =

Wentworth Bayly (died 27 December 1831) was the owner of the Gibraltar estate in Saint George Parish, Jamaica. He was elected to the House of Assembly of Jamaica in 1820. He died at Weston Hall, Suffolk. His will is held at the British National Archives.
