= Alexander Bayley =

Alexander Bayley (died 1832) was the owner of the Woodhall (or Wood Hall) estate in Saint Dorothy Parish, Jamaica, and a slave-owner of over 200 people at one time. He was elected to the House of Assembly of Jamaica in 1820.
