= Parishes of Jamaica =

Parish
- Category: Unitary state
- Location: Jamaica
- Found in: Counties of Jamaica
- Created: 1655 (Colony of Jamaica)
- Number: 14 parishes (since 1866)
- Populations: 69,533 (Hanover) – 573,369 (Saint Andrew)
- Areas: 25 km^{2} (9.7 sq mi) (Kingston) – 1,213 km^{2} (468 sq mi) (Saint Ann)
- Government: Parish government
- Subdivisions: Cities, Towns, Villages

The parishes of Jamaica are the main units of local government in Jamaica. They were created following the English settlement of Jamaica in 1655. This administrative structure for the Colony of Jamaica developed slowly. However, since 1 May 1867, Jamaica has been divided into the current fourteen parishes. These were retained after independence in 1962. They are grouped into three historic counties, which no longer have any administrative relevance. Every parish has a coast; none are landlocked.

== List ==
Parish		Capital	Area km^{2}	Population Census 2011
Cornwall County		Savanna-la-Mar	3,939.3	600,581
1	Hanover	Lucea	450.4	69,533
2	Saint Elizabeth	Black River	1,212.4	150,205
3	Saint James	Montego Bay	594.9	183,811
4	Trelawny	Falmouth	874.6	75,164
5	Westmoreland	Savanna-la-Mar	807.0	144,103
Middlesex County		Spanish Town	5,041.9	1,183,361
6	Clarendon	May Pen	1,169.3	245,103
7	Manchester	Mandeville	830.1	189,797
8	Saint Ann	Saint Ann's Bay	1,212.6	172,362
9	Saint Catherine	Spanish Town	1,192.4	516,218
10	Saint Mary	Port Maria	610.5	113,615
Surrey County		Kingston	2,009.3	823,689
11	Kingston Parish (Note: The parishes of Kingston and Saint Andrew together form the Kingston and St. Andrew Corporation.) (Note: The parish of Kingston does not encompass all of the city of Kingston. Most of the city is in the parish of St. Andrew.)	Kingston	21.8	89,057
12	Portland	Port Antonio	814.0	81,744
13	Saint Andrew	Half Way Tree	430.7	573,369
14	Saint Thomas	Morant Bay	742.8	93,902
Total	Jamaica	Kingston	10,991.0	2,697,983

Map of the parishes of Jamaica

== History ==
=== Early history ===
Following the English conquest of Jamaica the first phase of colonisation was carried out by the Army, with a system of Regimental plantations. These were drawn up on the southern flat lands, with the Regimental commanders charged with ordering their men to plant provisions.

Certain key figures such as Luke Stokes (1656) and Thomas Modyford (1664) brought substantial numbers of colonists from other English colonies. In 1662 the first census was carried out. There were no parishes and the division of the island into ten districts.

District		Men	Women	Children	Blacks	Arms	Acres in cultivation
1	In the precinct of Port Moranto	168	60	37	126	120	446
2	In the precinct of Morant	122	14	17	53	75	129
3	In the precinct of Yealoth (Yallahs)	207	36	25	54	72	355
4	In the precinct of Legene	553	149	125	54	300	549
5	The town of Angelo Delvega (St Jago de la Vega)	207	52	42	53	100	100
6	Between Black River, Bower Savanna and thereabouts	178	22	12	27	120	200
7	In the Angles Quarters	100	20	14	46	56	170
8	In the Seven Plantations, Macaria, Quathabeca (Guatibacoa)	275	50	20	50	150	250
9	In the quarters Quanaboa (Guanaboa Vale) and Quardalena	390	42	26	39	330	700
10	Upon Point Caugway (Cageway, i.e. Port Royal)	400	200	90	50	300	...
	Total	2,600	645	408	552	1,523	2,917

=== Creation of the parishes ===
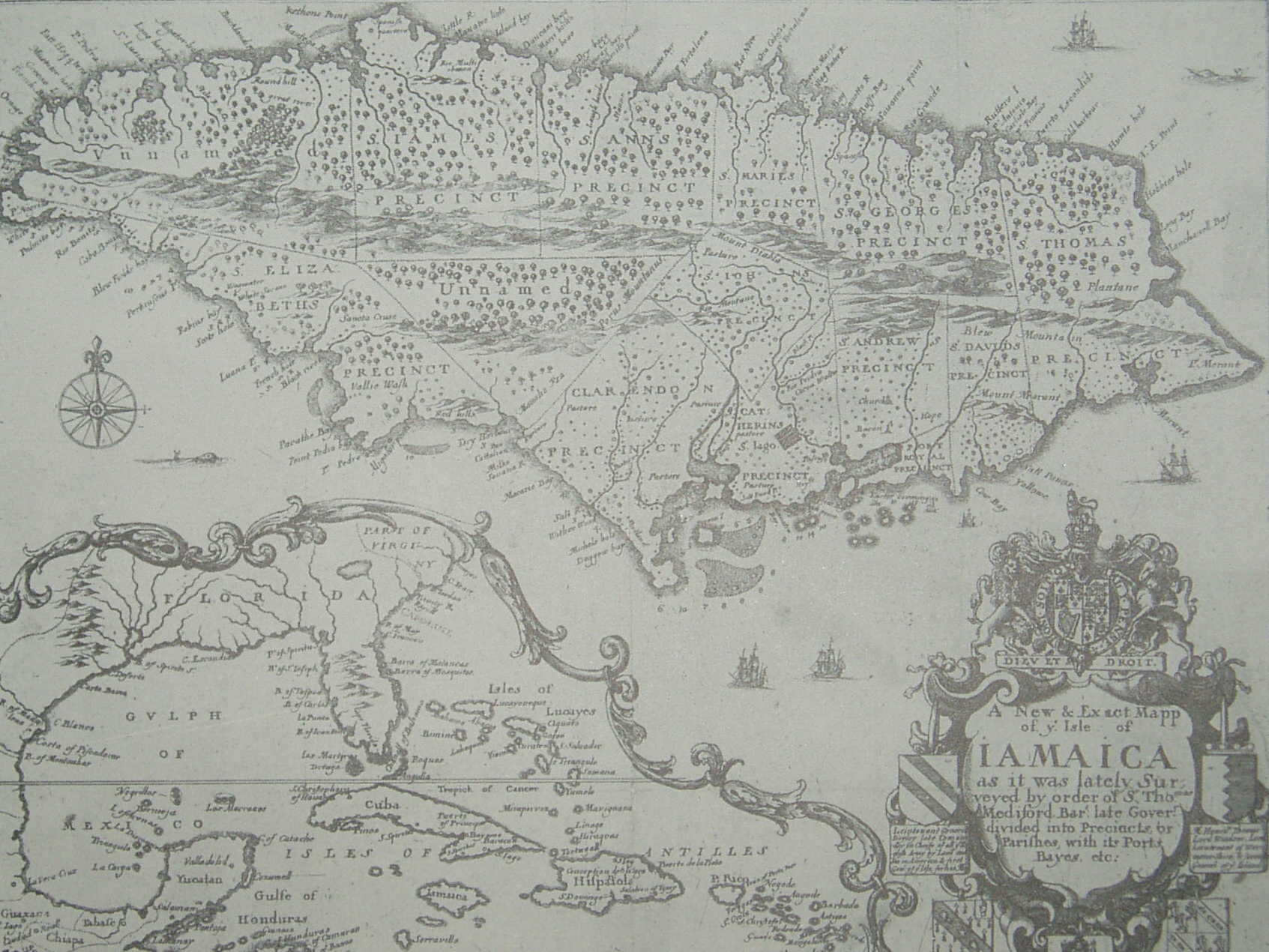
1671 map by Richard Bloome, completed on the instructions of Modyford

Under Governor Modyford the island was divided into precincts and parishes and he commissioned a map of the island featuring these. The first parishes were:

- Saint Catherine
- Clarendon
- Liguanea (St Andrew)
- Saint Thomas
- Port Royal
- Saint John
- Saint David

By 1675, the following parishes had been added:

- Vere (separated from Clarendon in 1673)
- Saint George
- Saint Thomas in the Vale
- Saint Dorothy
- Saint Ann
- Saint Elizabeth
- Saint James
- Saint Mary

In 1677, An Act for Regulating the Parishes fixed the boundaries of each parish.

=== The Grant reforms ===
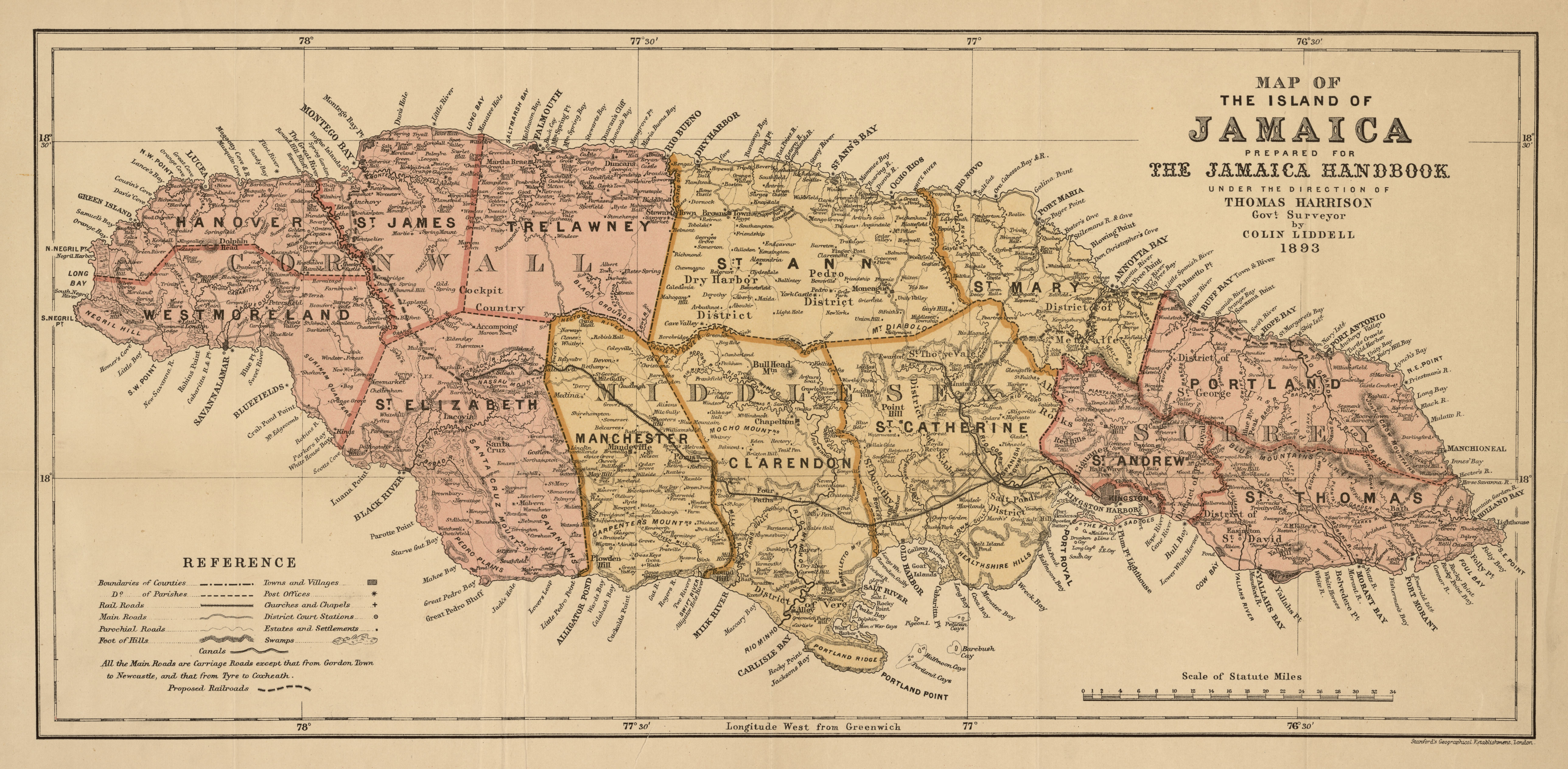
The parishes of Jamaica in 1893

The crisis highlighted by the Morant Bay rebellion led to the dissolution of the House of Assembly of Jamaica, and the colonial administration being turned into a crown colony. John Peter Grant was appointed Governor arriving in August 1866, and he set about instituting a number of reforms, including the administrative framework of the parishes. He introduced the by which the 22 existing parishes to 14 through the A Law to Reduce the Number of Parishes (1867/No. 20). Parishes have been a feature of local administration in Jamaica since the island was captured by the English in 1655. The number has varied over time and some no longer exist having either been absorbed into or divided between neighbouring parishes. At the peak, 1841–1865, there were 22 (the current 14 plus those listed below).

The current set of parishes was established in 1866 with the elimination of the 8 listed below (roughly by county):

Surrey:

- Port Royal (now divided between Kingston and Saint Andrew)
- Saint George (now divided between Saint Mary and Portland)
- Saint David (now part of Saint Thomas)

Middlesex:

- Metcalfe (now part of Saint Mary)
- Saint Dorothy (now part of Saint Catherine)
- Saint John (now part of Saint Catherine)
- Saint Thomas in the Vale (now part of Saint Catherine) – note that the current Saint Thomas used to be named "Saint Thomas in the East" to differentiate between the two parishes at the time.
- Vere (now part of Clarendon)

== Counties of Jamaica ==
Map of the counties: 1) Cornwall County, 2) Middlesex County, 3) Surrey County.

Jamaica is divided into three historic counties, though they have no administrative function today. They were established in 1758 to facilitate the holding of courts along the lines of the British county court system.

The three counties are named for the English historic counties of Cornwall, Middlesex, and Surrey. Cornwall County was named for being the westernmost county, just like its namesake. Middlesex County was named for its location on the middle third of Jamaica. Surrey County was named for the English county in which Kingston upon Thames is found, because Kingston was its county town.

County	Population (Census 2011)	Area in km^{2}	County town
Cornwall County	600,581	3,939.3	Savanna-la-Mar
Middlesex County	1,183,361	5,041.9	Spanish Town
Surrey County	823,689	2,009.3	Kingston
Jamaica	2,607,631	10,990.5	Kingston

== See also ==
- Government of Jamaica
- ISO 3166-2:JM
- List of Caribbean first-level subdivisions by total area
