= Attorney General Iredell =

Attorney General Iredell may refer to:

- James Iredell (1751–1799), Attorney General of North Carolina
- Thomas Iredell (c. 1720–1796), Attorney General of Jamaica
