= Saint Thomas in the Vale Parish, Jamaica =

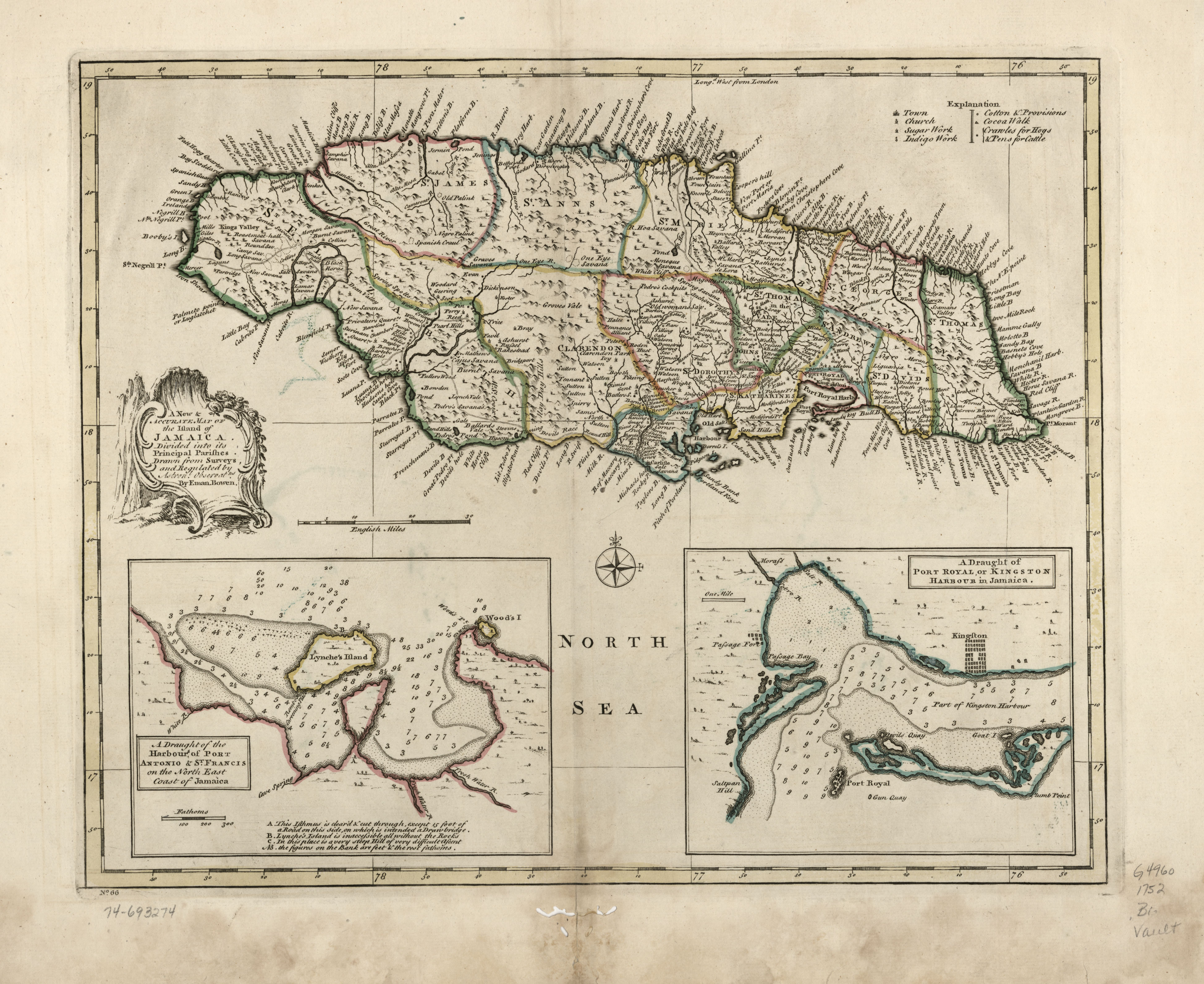
A New & Accurate Map of the Island of Jamaica. Divided into its Principal Parishes. Emanuel Bowen, 1752.

Saint Thomas in the Vale Parish was one of the historic parishes of Jamaica created following colonisation of the island by the British. It was in the centre of the island in Middlesex County but was abolished in 1866 when it was merged into Saint Catherine Parish.

It is not to be confused with Saint Thomas in the East Parish, now just known as Saint Thomas Parish, which was so named to differentiate the two.

== Representatives in the House of Assembly ==
The parish elected two members to the House of Assembly of Jamaica.

- 1677: Fulke Rose, George Nedham
- 1816: George Marshall, Robert William Harris
