= An Act for Regulating the Parishes =

An Act for Regulating the Parishes was a 1677 act that confirmed the boundaries of the parishes of colonial Jamaica.
