= George Marshall (Jamaican politician) =

Planter and politician in Jamaica

George Marshall, Esquire was a member of the House of Assembly of Jamaica. He was elected in first 1816 and again in July of 1820. It is likely that he served in the assembly sometime before 1816, too.

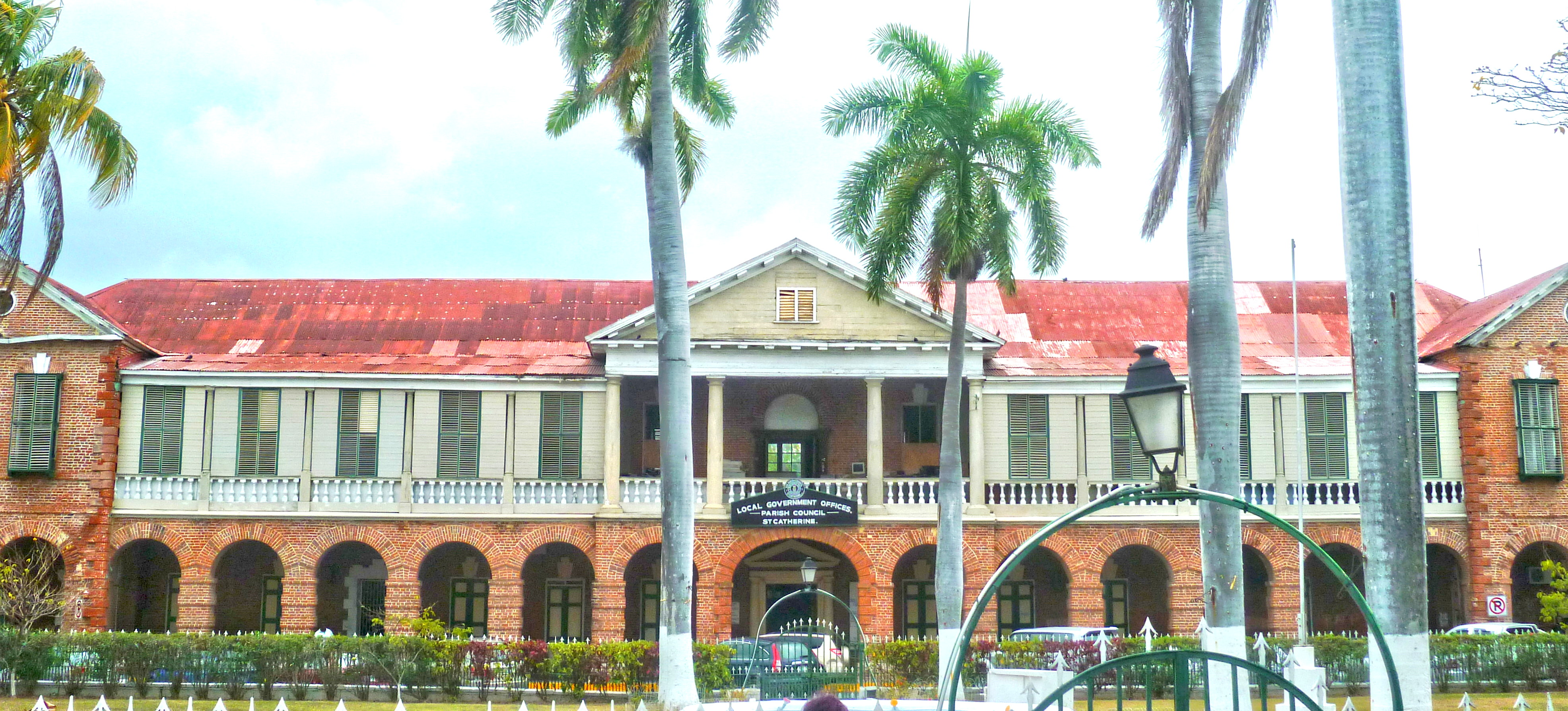
Former House of Assembly in Spanish Town, St. Catherine

== Career ==
Marshall represented the parish of Saint Thomas in the Vale. The parish had two representatives in the assembly. St. Thomas has since been merged with the parish of Saint Catherine.

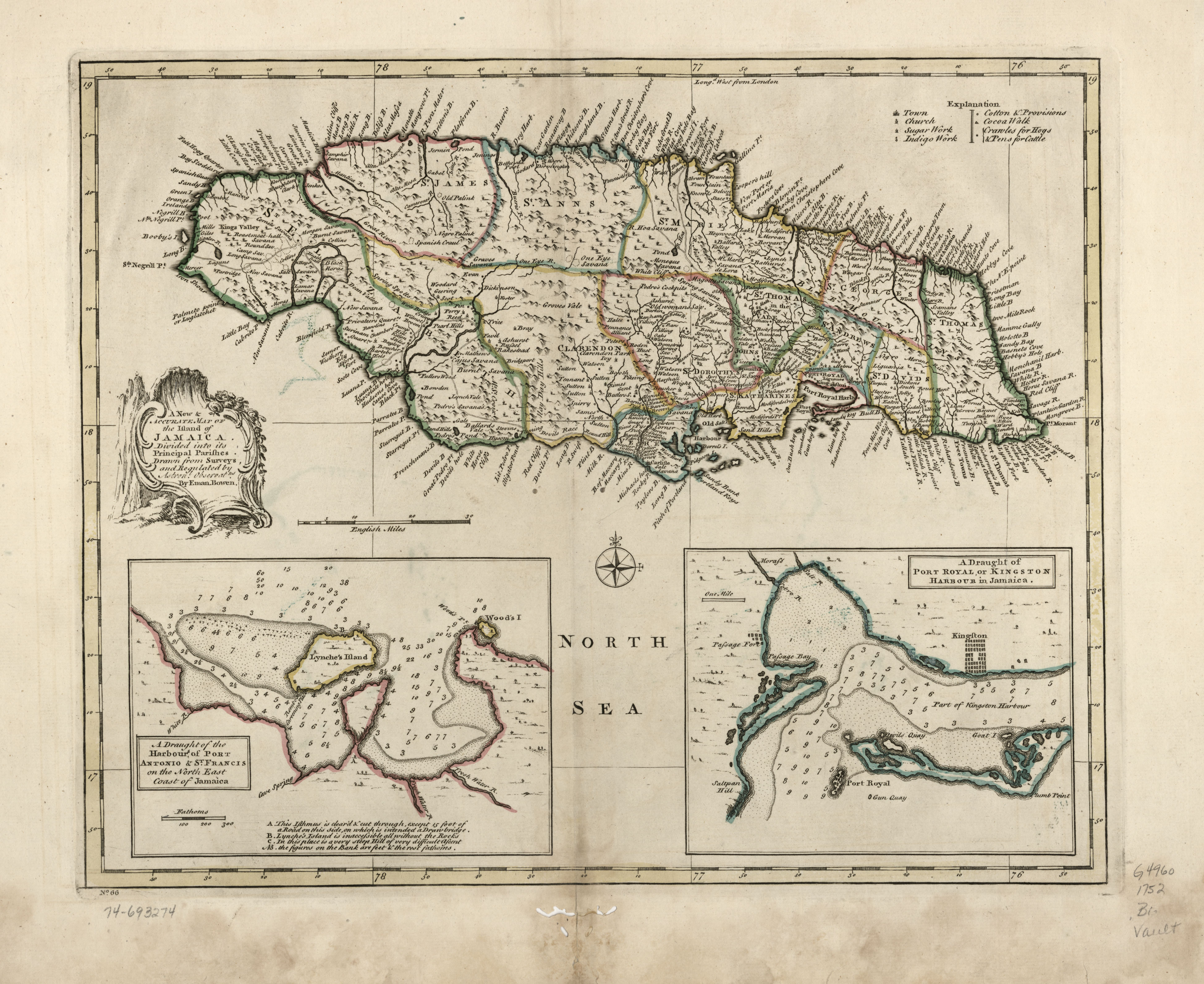
A New & Accurate Map of the Island of Jamaica. Divided into its Principal Parishes. Emanuel Bowen, 1752. St. Thomas in the Vale is outlined in green, to the left of the island’s center.

Marshall was one of 45 members of the assembly, not counting speaker of the house or the assembly’s clerk, sergeant at arms, chaplain, printer, or librarian.

In his 1816 term, the speaker of the house was the Honorable James Lewis. In 1820, it was the Honorable David Finlayson.

== Personal life ==
Little is known of Marshall’s personal life. A Kingston newspaper from 1794 reports a George Marshall from Spanish Town marrying a Miss Jesse Orr; it is possible that this is the same George Marshall.

Marshall appears in St. Thomas in the Vale property records beginning in 1811 and going through 1833. He does not appear in the property records of the following almanac (1838). Records show that Marshall had a property called Golden Grove, on which he had around 70-100 slaves at any given time.

== Property ==
Year	Slaves	Stock
1811	100	20
1812	100	20
1816	82	12
1818	81	10
1820	80	-
1821	80	-
1822	88	10
1823	90	10
1824	83	4
1825	84	2
1826	82	2
1827	82	2
1828	82	2
1829	82	2
1831	78	2
1832	136	4
1833	69	2
