= Rose v Royal College of Physicians =

18th century British landmark court case

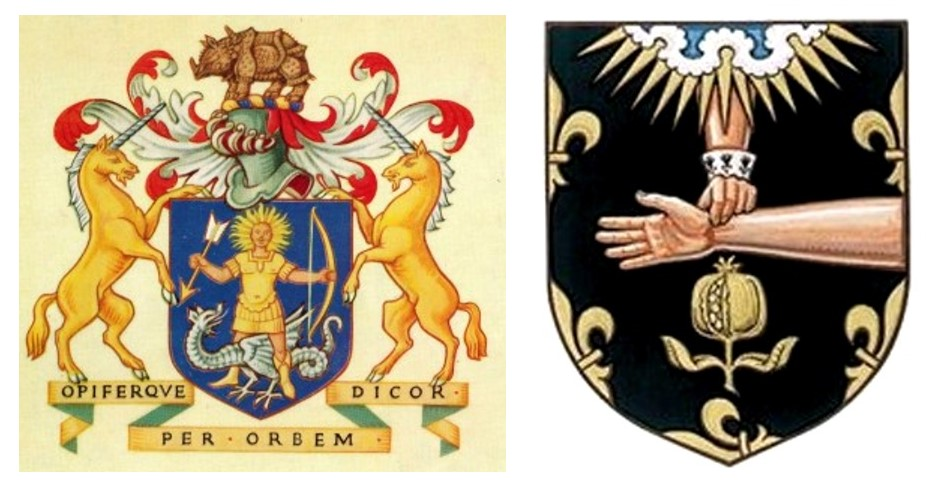
- Arms of the Society of Apothecaries (left) and the Royal College of Physicians (right)
- Court: Court of Queen’s Bench
- Decided: 15 March 1703

Case history
- Prior action: Prosecution of William Rose 1701–1703
- Appealed from: Society of Apothecaries
- Appealed to: House of Lords
- Subsequent action: Gave apothecaries the right to prescribe
- Related action: The Society of Apothecaries appealed to the House of Lords who subsequently reversed the verdict.

Court membership
- Judge sitting: Sir John Holt

Case opinions
- All judges gave opinions upholding the defendant's right to prescribe and practise Physick.
- Decision by: House of Lords

Rose v Royal College of Physicians, also known as The Rose Case, was a 1703 (also reported as 1704 (Note: Until September 1752, Great Britain used the Julian calendar, under which the year began on 25 March. That is, 15 March 1703 (Old Style) may also be written 15 March 1704 (New Style). For an explanation of these changes in calendar and dating styles, see Old Style and New Style dates.)) British landmark court case between the Royal College of Physicians (RCP) and William Rose, a Liveryman of the Society of Apothecaries. Rose had treated a John Seale, who complained about his treatment to the RCP, who brought a successful court action against Rose in 1703. The Society of Apothecaries and Rose successfully appealed against this judgement. However, this did not change medical practice but merely legitimised what apothecaries were doing already and confirmed the "status quo". It did, nevertheless, symbolize the decline in the college's growing legal monopoly over who practises medicine. The case was ultimately seen as not one between a College and one individual, but one between one powerful college against one powerful society.

Following a two-year debate on the definition of "physick", evidence supplied by butcher John Seale and the RCP was used in court to successfully prosecute Rose for practising 'physick' and administering medicines. However, fearing that the suit would lead to an infringement of their privileges as a whole profession, and in support of Rose, the Society of Apothecaries applied for a writ of error and the House of Lords swiftly reversed the judgement.

Apothecaries were the lowest category of doctor, originating from general shopkeepers, gaining a separate identity from 1617 and establishing a right to treat the sick during the Plague of 1665, when many physicians and their rich patients fled London. The House of Lords judgment upheld this right, and the decision established the legal recognition of apothecaries as doctors.

== Background ==
At the time of the Rose case, medical services were generally delivered by three providers; the surgeon, the apothecary, and the physician. Being university-educated, physicians ranked highest in status, relied heavily on good bedside manner, made diagnoses and wrote prescriptions, but did not dispense medicines.

Before 1703, it was forbidden for apothecaries to practise medicine by an Act of King Henry VIII. Their job was to compound and dispense medicines. However, the roles of these medical providers were already changing with the functions overlapping. Robert Pitt had later explained that physicians had been corrupted by the Great Fire of London and whilst many had fled London, many apothecaries were left to care for the sick people left behind. When the physicians returned, they found themselves to be reliant on referrals from these apothecaries. In addition, they also observed the apothecaries to be prescribing large quantities of expensive remedies. As a consequence, some physicians had begun to open dispensaries themselves, to the annoyance of apothecaries. These London dispensaries were endorsed by the RCP.

== Parties ==
=== John Seale ===
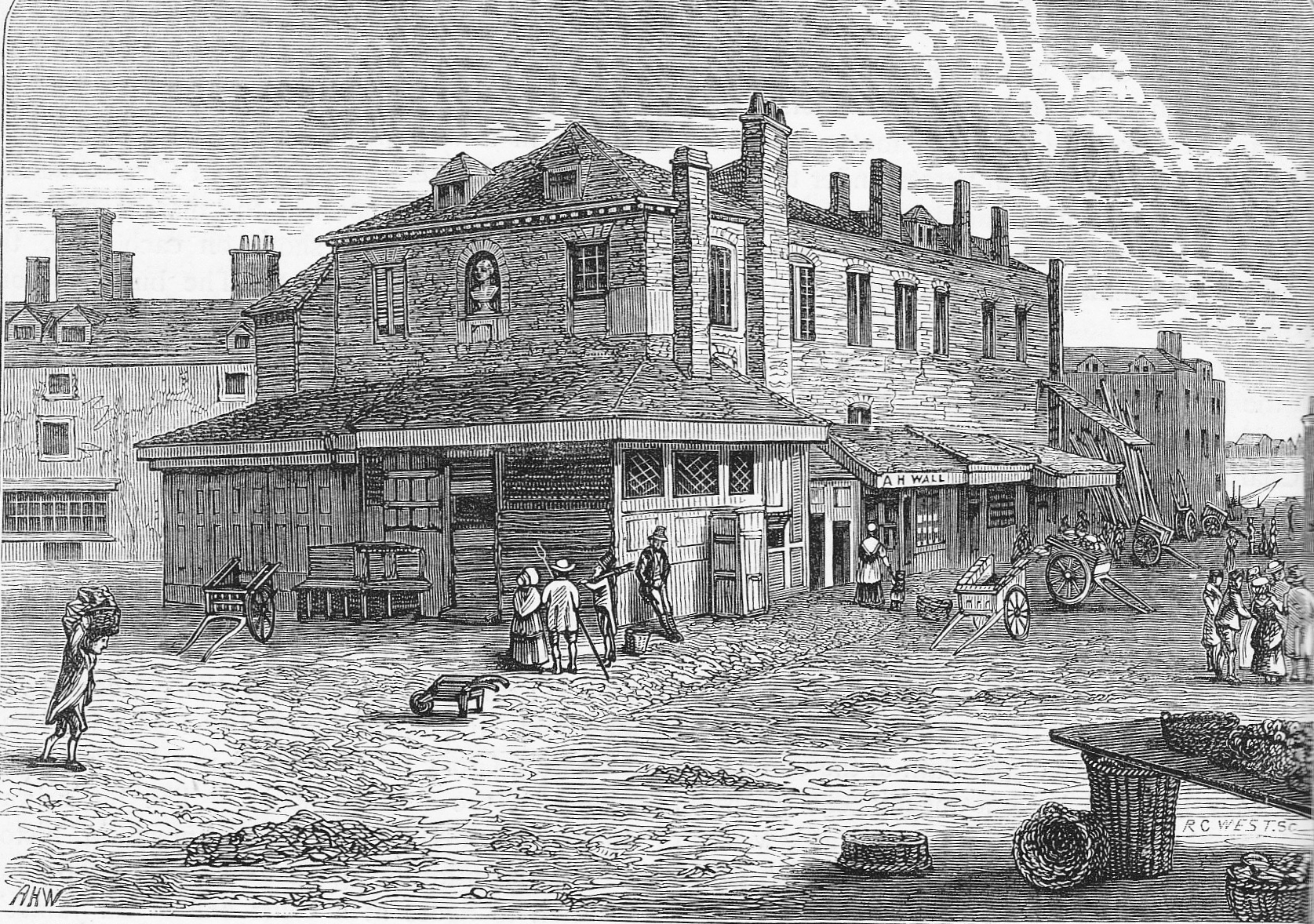
Hungerford Market, London, engraved by R.C. West, 1805

Seale was a poor butcher in Hungerford Market, London, during the winter of 1699-1700. He lived near to Rose and according to Rose, was suffering from venereal disease and was not trustworthy; he "hath been a very loose liver, and very much addicted to women, the effects of which fell sorely upon him the last years."

=== William Rose ===
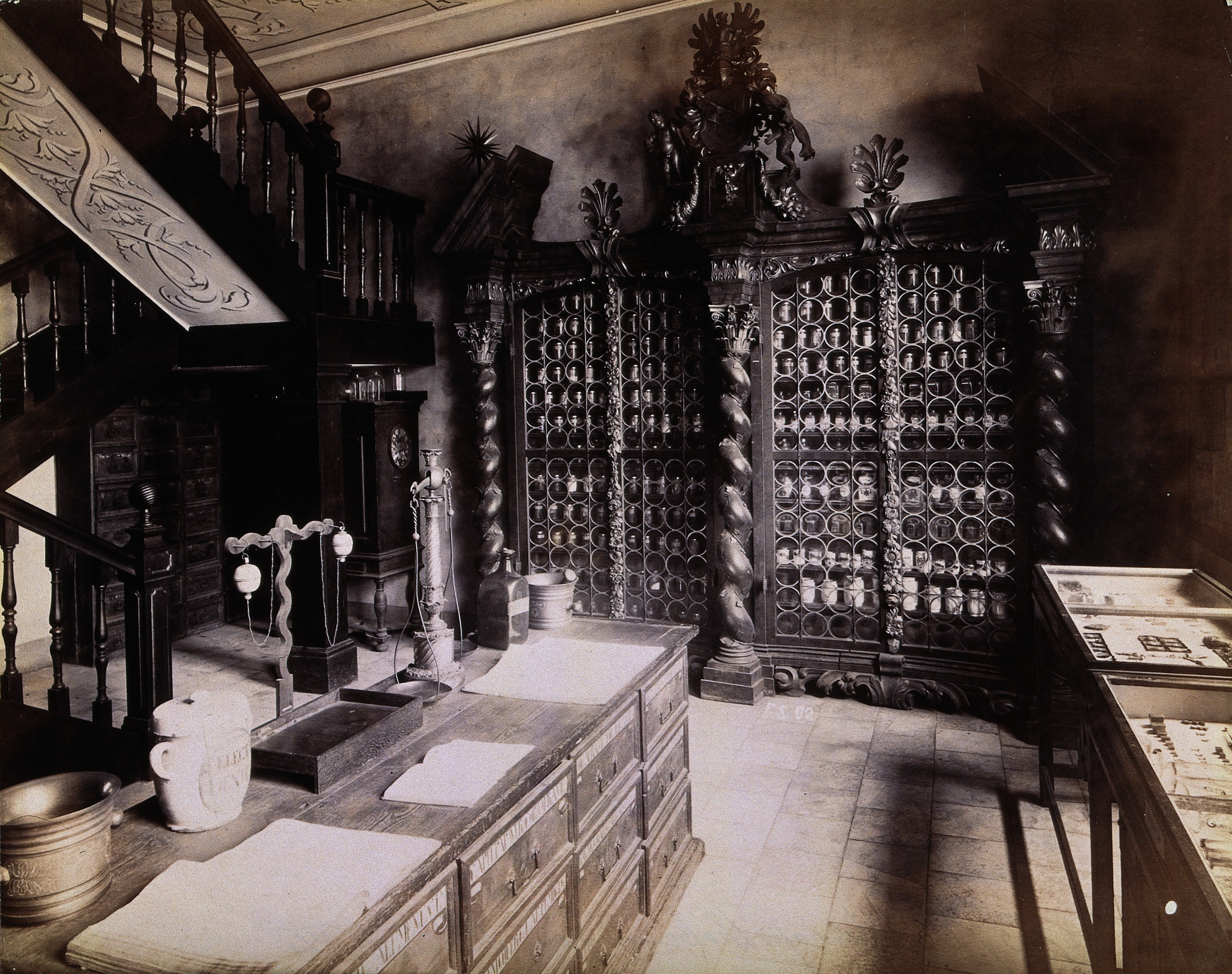
An eighteenth-century apothecary's shop recreated for the Deutsches Museum in Nürnberg

During the trial, Rose was an influential and high ranking liveryman of the Society of Apothecaries, associating with London's wealthiest citizens. His brothers included Thomas Rose and Francis Rose who patented land in Jamaica, and John Rose, a London merchant, who traded with Jamaica and transported labourers there on his ships. Another brother, Fulke Rose, was an early colonist of Jamaica whose widow eventually married Sir Hans Sloane.

=== The Royal College of Physicians ===
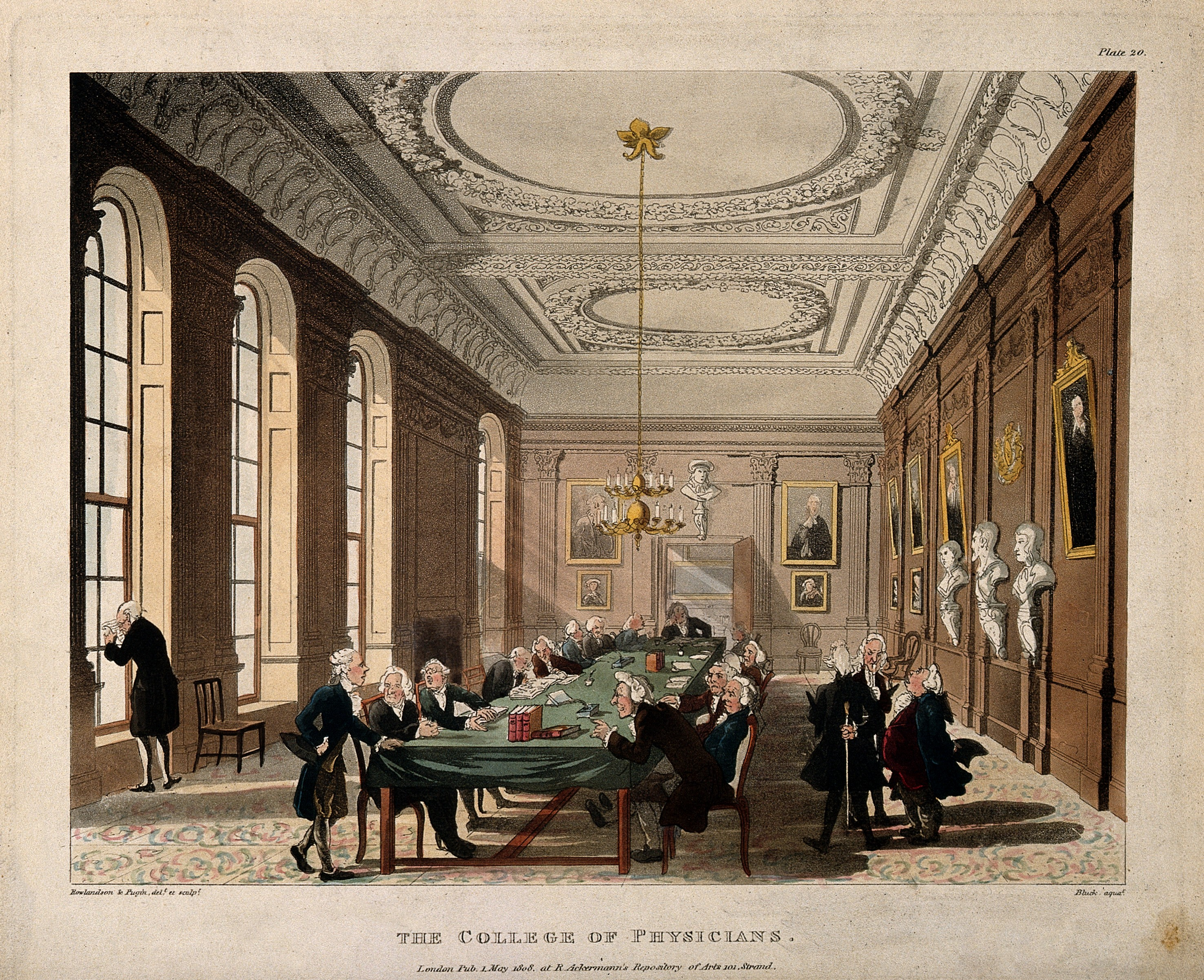
Meeting of the College of Physicians as imagined by Rowlandson and Pugin. Aquatint by J. Bluck, 1808.

Throughout the 17th century, the college actively controlled medical licensing in London by punishing those involved in "malapraxa". The founding RCP charter of 1518 had established the duty of the censor as to "enquire about all practitioners of medicine ... to examine, correct and govern them, if necessary to prosecute them".

The RCP, in addition, was unable to stop a Bill in 1694 which gave the Society of Apothecaries certain exemptions and recognition that apothecaries were caring for an increasing number of Londoners, many more than physicians.

=== The Society of Apothecaries ===
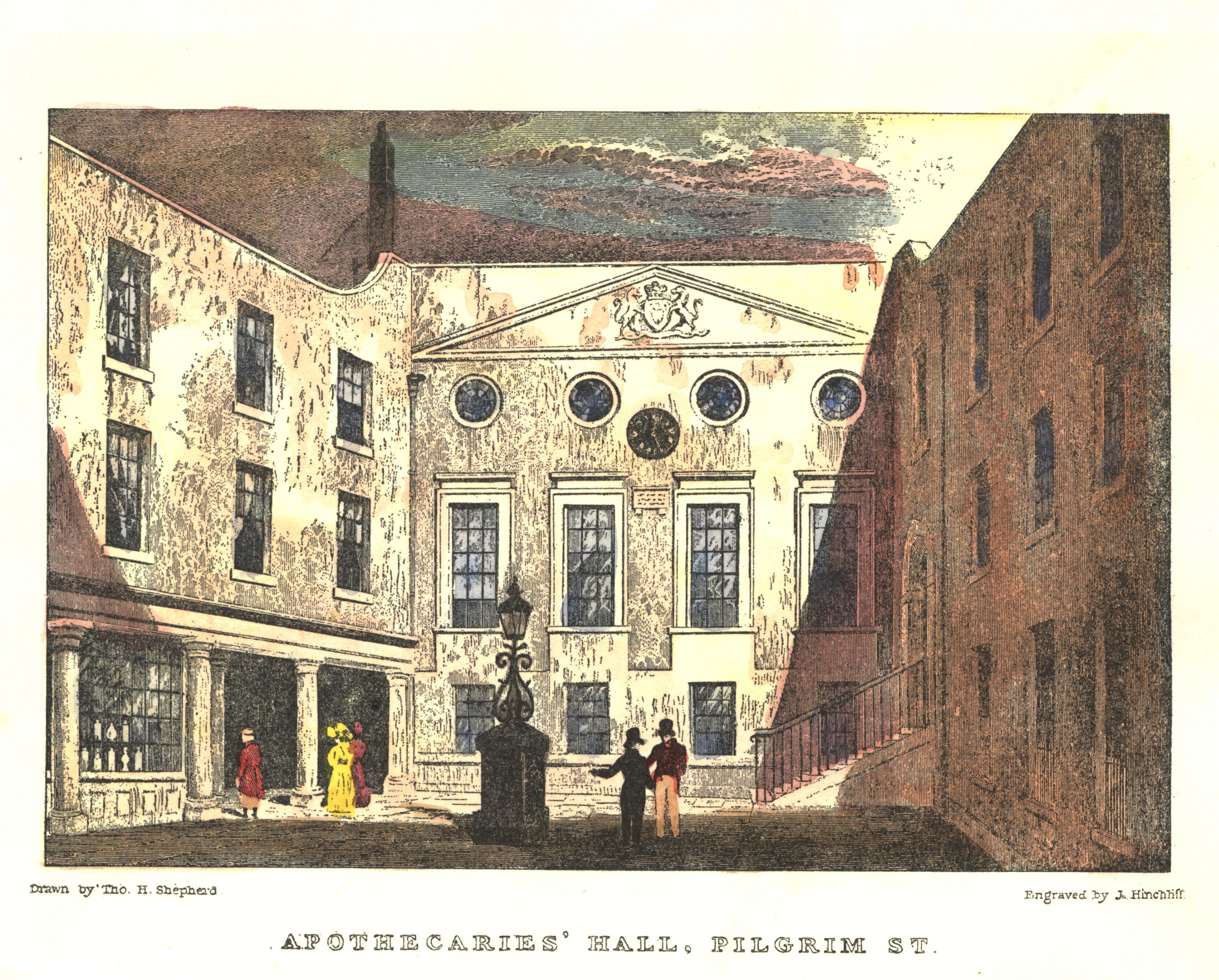
Apothecaries Hall, Pilgrim St Engraved by John James Hinchliff from a drawing by Thomas Hosmer Shepherd, c. 1850.

Apothecaries originated in the supply of medicinal spices and herbs, gained a separate identity from grocers in 1617, and established a right to treat the sick during the plague of 1665, when many physicians and their rich patients fled London. By the time of the trial, apothecaries were appearing increasingly on the list of highest tax payers and the Society of Apothecaries was also “one of the most considerable corporations of London" and "politically powerful".

== Prosecution ==
Initially, in February 1701, Rose was charged and tried before the Court of Queen’s Bench and then subsequently prosecuted two years later. His charge was that without any official licence or instruction from a physician and exclusive of any fee, he did practise 'physick' as well as prepared and administered medicines to Seale.

After paying Rose a “vast sum of money” and subsequently receiving a further bill of £50 (equivalent to £9,800 in 2025), Seale turned to a London dispensary where cheaper medicines provided him with a quicker cure.

=== Physick ===
Only College members could practise ‘physick’, but the question of what constituted practise of physick was debated. Seale was angry enough to speak to a committee of censors at the College in Warwick lane, accusing Rose of giving him 'physick' from 5 December 1699 to January 1700.

=== Trial and verdict ===
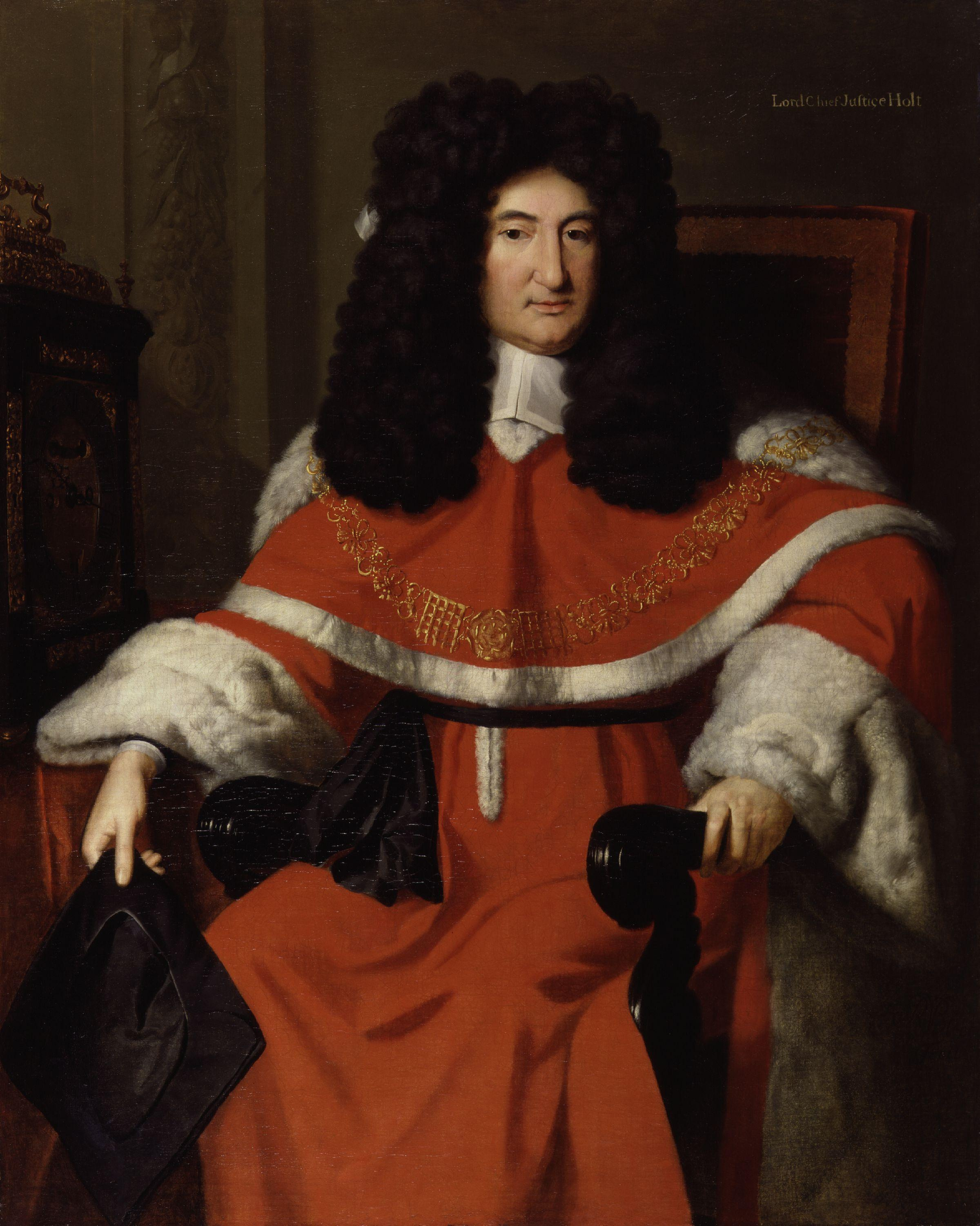
Sir John Holt by Richard van Bleeck, oil on canvas, c. 1700. National Portrait Gallery, London.

Whether Rose stood in his own defence or was even summoned was not documented, but it was the college’s intention to put him before judge and jury. The college annals stated their decision: “that Mr Swift, the attorney of the College prosecute the said William Rose forthwith”. In the meantime, Seale had accused Rose of returning to him with rage against the allegations. Mr Swift, with the support of the King’s Bench subsequently ensured that the jury found Rose guilty of compounding several medicines and selling them to Seale – infringing on the privileges of the physicians as set in the college's charter and endorsed by the Physicians Act 1523 (14 & 15 Hen. 8. c. 5). Sir John Holt, leading Whig judge, made his judgement and fined Rose £5, equivalent to one month’s practice (about £983 in 2025).

== Appeal ==
Rose politely pleaded with the RCP as evidenced by a surviving letter he wrote to Hans Sloane in 1701. However, the apology was not accepted. Rose argued that he received fees only for preparing the medicines and not for giving advice and therefore the sentence was unfair. Upon the advice of the attorney-general, the Society of Apothecaries applied for a writ of error in the House of Lords, requesting that the judgement be reversed and Rose be relieved of the penalty imposed upon him. The hearing was on 15 March 1703, (sometimes documented as March 1704).

=== Society of Apothecaries plea ===
The Society of Apothecaries were represented by Thomas Powys and Samuel Dodd and indicated that the consequences of prosecuting him would be devastating not only to Rose but to all apothecaries, who would not be able to practise their profession without the licence of a physician. They also emphasised outdated laws and charters. Dodd also stated “I am not only for the apothecaries but for all the poor people of England”. The trial record showed that Rose had merely made up the medicines and there was no evidence that he advised or sold Seale medicines. In addition, Seale was deemed to be suffering from a minor ailment, one that an apothecary would be attending to. Their statement confirmed that the apothecary had always gone about their work this way and it “may not be deemed unlawful” if they advise common medicines for common conditions or if they practised as a physician without fee. They accused the physicians of monopolising “physick”, which if continued, would be a burden and damaging to people who when slightly ill would not be able to obtain medicines without consulting and giving a fee to member of the college. In addition, it would prejudice those who suddenly became unwell at night and would usually call for the apothecary.

=== Royal College of Physicians defence ===
The college argued that the appeal was unfounded and contrary to the society’s account, College members were directed to give advice to the poor and visit them at home as necessary. They accused apothecaries of having high charges for medicines, which frequently made people feel worse. As a result they had been compelled to open dispensaries in London so that the poor could see a physician for free and pay for medicines at a lesser cost. They disputed that apothecaries were needed to deal with common complaints – neighbours and family could deal with these lesser minor ailments, or better still, they could self-care. That the apothecary was necessary was doubtful in the eyes of the college and they continued to reiterate that physicians were just as easily accessible in the city. They were adamant that apothecaries should not “judge” a disease and then advocate a medicine – not only would this be dangerous but likely to be further chargeable. A particular note on assessing diseases in its early stage was made, with the college saying that diseases are often difficult to decipher early on and that apothecaries were not qualified and therefore it was unsafe: “the management thereof ought not to be left to their judgement”. They concluded that should the apothecary make a mistake, eventually, the physician would be needed to correct it.

=== Final verdict ===
After the hearing, the House of Lords stated: “That the said judgement given in Queen’s Bench…against the said William Rose, shall be, and is hereby, reversed." This was the crucial moment of the legal recognition of apothecaries as the “medico-pharmaceutical practitioner” or doctors.

The decision established the right of apothecaries to give advice as well as to dispense medicines.

== Interpretation ==
Rose was likely a victim of the disputes between the apothecaries and physicians in the years approaching 1700. At a time when the college would impose fines, it was unusual to have taken Rose to court. "Rose's Balsamick Elixir", according to Harold Cook, was the reason. Rose had marketed his own remedy to the fury of physicians. Coincidentally a "Mr William Rouse", who encouraged attacks on the college and may have possibly been William Rose himself, may have given the RCP cause to single him out and create a test case. The case was essentially not one of a college against one individual, but one of a college against another powerful organisation, the Society of Apothecaries, who ultimately won. Cooke takes the view that the success of the appeal did not change medical practice but merely legitimised what apothecaries were doing already and confirmed the "status quo". It did however, symbolize the decline in the college's growing legal monopoly over who practises medicine.

Its interpretation has been extensively debated by historians. Roy Porter explained that it 'secured the apothecaries "right to prescribe"'. The case legalised the apothecaries role in treating people, so long as they did not charge for the advice. However, they were allowed to prepare and sell medicines and according to Zachary Cope, contribute to the habit of expecting a medicine upon seeing a doctor. However, this was disputed by Irvine Loudon, who argued otherwise. Loudon also highlighted the complex change in ranking of apothecaries, physicians and surgeons. In addition, he states the importance of the case in the development of general practice extending into the twentieth century and that the judgement may have "perpetuated the inferior status of the apothecary by underlining his financial dependence on the sale of goods rather than his expert knowledge and advice".

== Legacy ==
The Rose prize is awarded jointly by the Royal College of General Practitioners (RCGP) and the Society of Apothecaries, to an essay based on original work centred on general practice. It is named after both Fraser Macintosh Rose, founder of RCGP and apothecary William Rose.

== Sequelae ==
Apothecaries had been attempting to claim legal permission to prescribe for many years prior to Rose's case. The physicians overruled each time with occasions of fining the apothecaries, burning their drugs and imprisoning them. Later, the apothecaries were to battle with druggists and chemists in a similar way.

More than a hundred years later, in 1815, following the Apothecaries Act, the Society of Apothecaries began to examine medical students and issue the licentiate of the Society of Apothecaries From 1858, apothecaries were listed with physicians and surgeons in one register of medical practitioners.
