= Sir Henry Moore, 1st Baronet =

British colonial administrator

Sir Henry Moore Bt
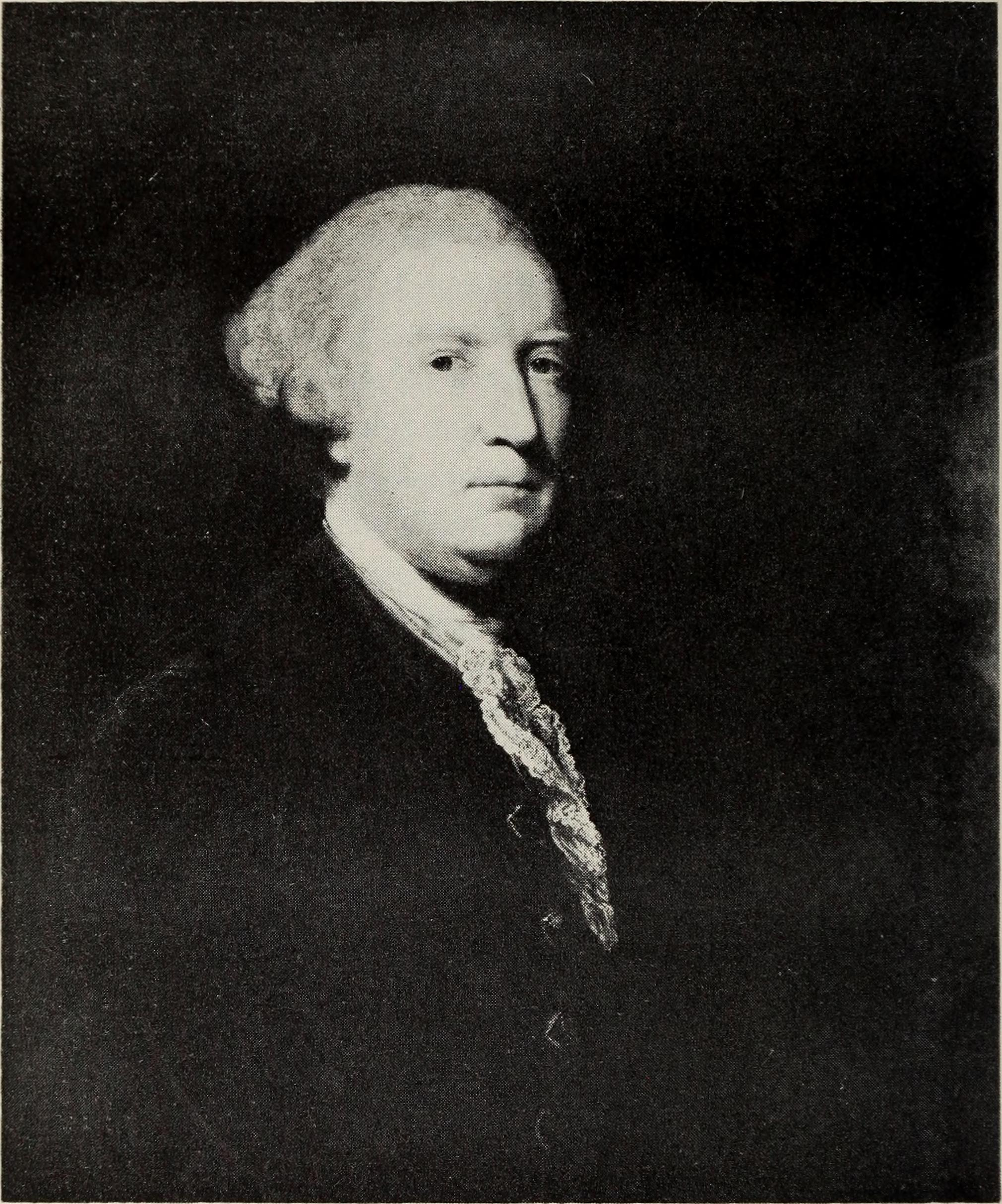
- Portrait by Sir Joshua Reynolds

Governor of New York
- In office 1765–1769
- Monarch: George III
- Preceded by: Cadwallader Colden
- Succeeded by: Cadwallader Colden

Personal details
- Born: 7 February 1713 Vere Parish, Jamaica
- Died: 11 September 1769 (aged 56) New York, New York

Sir Henry Moore, 1st Baronet (7 February 1713 – 11 September 1769) was a British colonial administrator who served as the governor of New York from 1765 to 1769, when he died in office. Moore also served as the lieutenant governor of Jamaica in 1756 and again from 1759 to 1762. He was granted a baronetcy in 1764.

== Early life ==
Henry Moore was born on 7 February 1713 in Vere Parish, Jamaica. His parents were prominent members of the planter class who arranged for him to undergo a legal education. After coming of age, Moore became active in managing the affairs of the colonial government.

== Governor of Jamaica ==
In 1756, Moore was appointed as the lieutenant governor of Jamaica, which made him the acting governor of the colony. Like many Crown colonies, the governor was frequently absent, collecting his fees and salary while remaining in the British Isles; a local lieutenant governor and council forming the de facto government.

In 1760, Moore gained a considerable reputation for leadership by suppressing Tacky's War, a slave rebellion. Under Moore's leadership, the Jamaican Maroons of Nanny Town, Charles Town, Jamaica and Scott's Hall were summoned to help the colonial forces suppress the revolt. Nanny Town was reportedly renamed Moore Town in his honour.

== Governor of New York ==
Coat of Arms of Sir Henry Moore

Moore's reward for good performance as Jamaica's governor was first to be made a Baronet, and then in 1764 he was named royal governor for New York.

He arrived in New York City with his family in November 1765. Relations between the colonies and England were strained under the governorship of Cadwallader Colden by this time, but not yet in open rebellion. New York City had seen riots and protests over the Stamp Act, esp around Fort George.

As new governor, Moore calmed these by meeting directly with Isaac Sears, a leader of the Sons of Liberty. Moore agreed with Sears and the colony's assembly to suppress the Stamp Act, and gained additional goodwill by reducing military fortifications within the city. His openness and courtesy earned him floral tributes while other colonial governors were being burned in effigy.

However, during the next few years, he actively used military force to suppress rural riots by tenants of the large estate owners. He ordered General Thomas Gage to actively pursue and suppress this form of rebellion. This did not seem to bring him any increased difficulty in governing, for two reasons: that the Sons of Liberty also feared the introduction of rural problems into the city, believing that they should be the only ones to use riots as a bargaining tactic; and that the assembly at the time was dominated by the patroons, or large estate owners. In December 1767 Moore dissolved the assembly to allow the patroons to make up through new elections some of the numbers they had lost earlier.

== Death ==
Moore married Catherine Maria Long, a member of another prominent Jamaica family, in 1765. They had several children, and after Henry's death, Catherine moved to England. Catherine's Peak (altitude 1158 metres) in Jamaica is named after her, as local legend reports her to be the first woman to climb the peak.

Moore died suddenly while in office in New York City in 1769. The duties of governor then fell on Lieutenant Governor Cadwallader Colden, whose term was much less peaceful. Moore left with the respect of almost all the colony's leadership, the only exception being certain religious fundamentalists angered by his efforts to create a theatre or playhouse. He was succeeded in the baronetcy by his thirteen-year-old son John Henry Moore, who died in 1780 aged 23.

Government offices
Preceded by Charles Knowles	Governor of Jamaica (acting); 1756	Succeeded by George Haldane
Preceded by George Haldane	Governor of Jamaica (acting); 1759–1762	Succeeded by Sir William Lyttleton
Preceded by Cadwallader Colden (acting)	Governor of the Province of New York; 1765–1769	Succeeded by Cadwallader Colden (acting)
Baronetage of Great Britain
New creation	Baronet (of Jamaica); 1764–1769	Succeeded by John Henry Moore
