= Thomas Iredell =

Jamaican politician, lawyer (died 1796)

Thomas Iredell (c. 1720 - September 1796) was Attorney General of Jamaica in 1766 and served on the Royal Council of Jamaica from 1775 until the date of his death.

He owned Pindar's Valley plantation in Clarendon Parish.
