= York Castle High School =

Location
- York Castle High Dr. Egypt; Brown's Town, Middlesex, St. Ann; Jamaica
- Coordinates: 18.3867696°N 77.3624396°W

Information
- School type: Traditional
- Motto: Nil Sine Magno Labore (Nothing is achieved without hard work)
- Religious affiliation: Christianity
- Denomination: Methodist
- Founded: January 5th 1876
- Status: Open
- School board: Ministry of Education
- Principal: Mr. Raymon Treasure
- Head of school: Mr. Raymon Treasure
- Head teacher: Mrs. Morgan-Williams
- Chaplain: Rev. Athlone Harrison
- Age range: 12-19
- Average class size: 48 students
- Campus: Egypt
- Houses: Bramwell, Murray, Henderson and Curphey
- Colours: Black, White and Gold
- Slogan: Up up you mighty Yorkist we can accomplish what we will. BLACK AND GOLD BRAVE AND BOLD
- Song: York Castle High Reach for the Sky
- Athletics conference: Inter-School Sports Association
- Sports: Track & Field, Cricket, Basketball, Football, Netball, Rugby, Hockey (both male and female) Volleyball and Table Tennis (soon to be played)
- Nickname: Castle and YC
- Newspaper: The Student Voice
- Yearbook: The Egyptian

York Castle High School is a co-educational secondary school in Jamaica. The school has educated some of the region's best leaders and it continues to play a pivotal role in Jamaica's development.

== History ==
On a hill side property by the name of Egypt in North-West St. Ann is a high school named "York Castle", tucked away for the past 52 years and responsible for some of Jamaica's most prominent scholars. York Castle High School has a rich history and roots dating back as far as 1875.

In that year, the Methodist Church purchased a property named York Castle near Alderton, where they established a Theological College in 1876. In 1896, York Castle closed due to financial difficulties. Despite this closure, the need for education in the area remained a constant challenge to men of vision who embraced the idea which has originally led to the founding of York Castle in 1876. Before the closure, Mr. T. Bramwell had in 1903 set up a Middlesex High School in Brown's Town. Mr. Bramwell served as principal for over 40 years. After his death, Middlesex High School was renamed Henderson High School in 1947, after a Baptist minister - Rev. George Henderson. Henderson High School closed in 1954.

By this time, the idea of continuing the principle of education found custody in the hands of concerned citizens who renamed the school Northside in 1955.

At the synod of the Methodist Church in 1946, there was a resolution asking the church to recognize its obligation to establish a school for boys, or possibly a coeducational school to be called "York Castle". A committee was set up which was entrusted with the task of establishing a new school in St. Ann. This committee contemplated a site for this new school. On November 30, 1956, the committee, consisting of educators, churchmen and others met and considered an offer from Northside secondary school that the school be handed over to the Methodist Church. The offer was accepted. with a proposed loan from the Methodist Church and gifts from past students of the former York Castle and the sale of the property which the former York Castle was sited, it was agreed that as of January 1, 1957 the Methodist Church would assume control over Northside Secondary School. the Egypt site was decided on in March 1957 and the stone laying ceremony took place on May 16, 1957. By August, the school was given a full ministerial recognition as a secondary grant aided school now bearing the name York Castle High School.

On January 7, 1958, the new school building was opened with 195 day students and 40 boarders. In February, the official opening of the building was done by the Hon. N.W. Manley, Premier of Jamaica.

=== School crest ===
The book in the upper left hand corner of the crest bears the words, "Gloria Deo", meaning Glory be to God.

== Competitions ==
=== Schools Challenge Quiz ===
In 1972, York Castle High School was the winner of Jamaica Broadcasting Corporation (JBC, now TVJ) Schools Challenge Quiz competition in Jamaica. Team members were Omar Brown (captain), James Walsh, Lorence Brown and Lawrence Alexander. The team was coached by Ms Jackie Vernon (now Mrs. Jackie Bertram). York Castle High School holds the following records in the Schools Challenge Quiz competition:

- The first Coed school to win Schools Challenge Quiz.
- The first rural area school to win SCQ.
- The only school in St. Ann to win SCQ.

=== National Secondary School Debating Competition ===
In 2015, York Castle High School championed the Burger King's National Secondary Schools Debating Competition over 30 different high schools across the island. Winning St. Mary High School in the heated finals of the competition. The team members were Danmar Clarke (captain), Kadijah Cox, Micheal Miller and Bobby Francis. The team was coached by Mrs. Nickashie Chin-Hardware and Ms. D. Clarke.

=== Public Speaking Competition ===
In February 2016, York Castle High School championed the Rita Marley Foundation Public Speaking competition over 10 top high schools across the island, beating Glenmuir High School and Haile Selassie High School in the heated finals of the competition. The group of over 25 students supported the Public Speaking Champion 14 years old Bobby Francis. Bobby Francis was coached by Mrs. H. Mears-Griffths and Mr. Adam-Clay Webb. York Castle High School holds the following National records:

- Presenting the youngest participant to enter and win competition.
- Only school in St. Ann to win a Public Speaking Competition.

== Principals ==
York Castle High School principals
Name of principal	Years served
Rev. John W. Poxon	1957–1969
Hon. Mr. Burchell A. Whiteman	1969–1976
Mr. James V. McDonald	1976–1980
Mr. Sterling Gordon	1980–1991
Mr. Carl Brown	1991–1995
Mr. Caswell Burton	1995–1997
Mrs. Beverely Hawthorne	1997–2009
Mr. Raymon St.A Treasure	2009–present

== Houses ==
There are four houses at York Castle High:

- Bramwell - Green
- Henderson - Blue
- Curphey - Yellow
- Murray - Red
