= Sir John Henry Moore, 2nd Baronet =

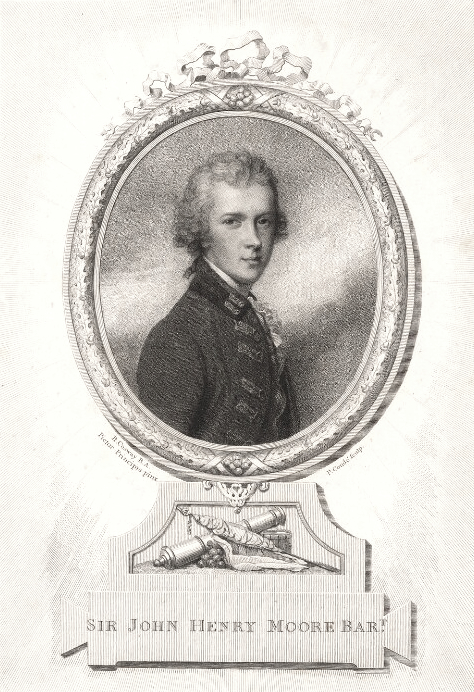
John Henry Moore

Sir John Henry Moore, 2nd Baronet (1756–1780) was a British poet.

== Life ==
He was born on Jamaica, the only son of Sir Henry Moore, 1st Baronet and his wife Catharina Maria Long, eldest daughter of the planter Samuel Long of Tredudwell of the Longville Estate, Jamaica; Edward Long was his uncle. He, and then his sister Susannah Jane Dickson (1752–1821), inherited the Moore Hall Estate in Jamaica.

John Henry Moore was a pupil at Eton College. He matriculated at Emmanuel College, Cambridge in 1768, and succeeded to the baronetcy in 1769. He graduated B.A. in 1773; M.A. in 1776. He died unmarried at Taplow on 16 January 1780, when the baronetcy became extinct.

== Works ==
Moore frequently resided at Bath, Somerset and took part in the poetic coterie of Lady Anna Miller. His lines "To Melancholy" inspired "Go, you may call it madness, folly" by Samuel Rogers. Oliver Elton, who calls the coterie "Batheaston triflers", writes "his talent for light and finished satire is evident, and he has been aptly said to announce the "spirit and the note" of Byron."

- The New Paradise of Dainty Devices (1777), anonymous, published by John Almon. It contained a parody "Elegy written in a College Library" of Elegy in a Country Churchyard by Thomas Gray. It also contained swipes at the book reviewers John Langhorne and William Kenrick.
- Poetical Trifles (Bath, 1778), was a re-issue of some of the New Paradise; a third edition appeared posthumously in 1783, edited by his friend Edward Jerningham.

Moore's poems appeared in Thomas Park's "British Poets" (1808, vol. xli), and the Chiswick Press "British Poets" (1822, vol. lxxiii).
