= Saint John Parish, Jamaica =

Coordinates: 17.8972°N 76.2879°W

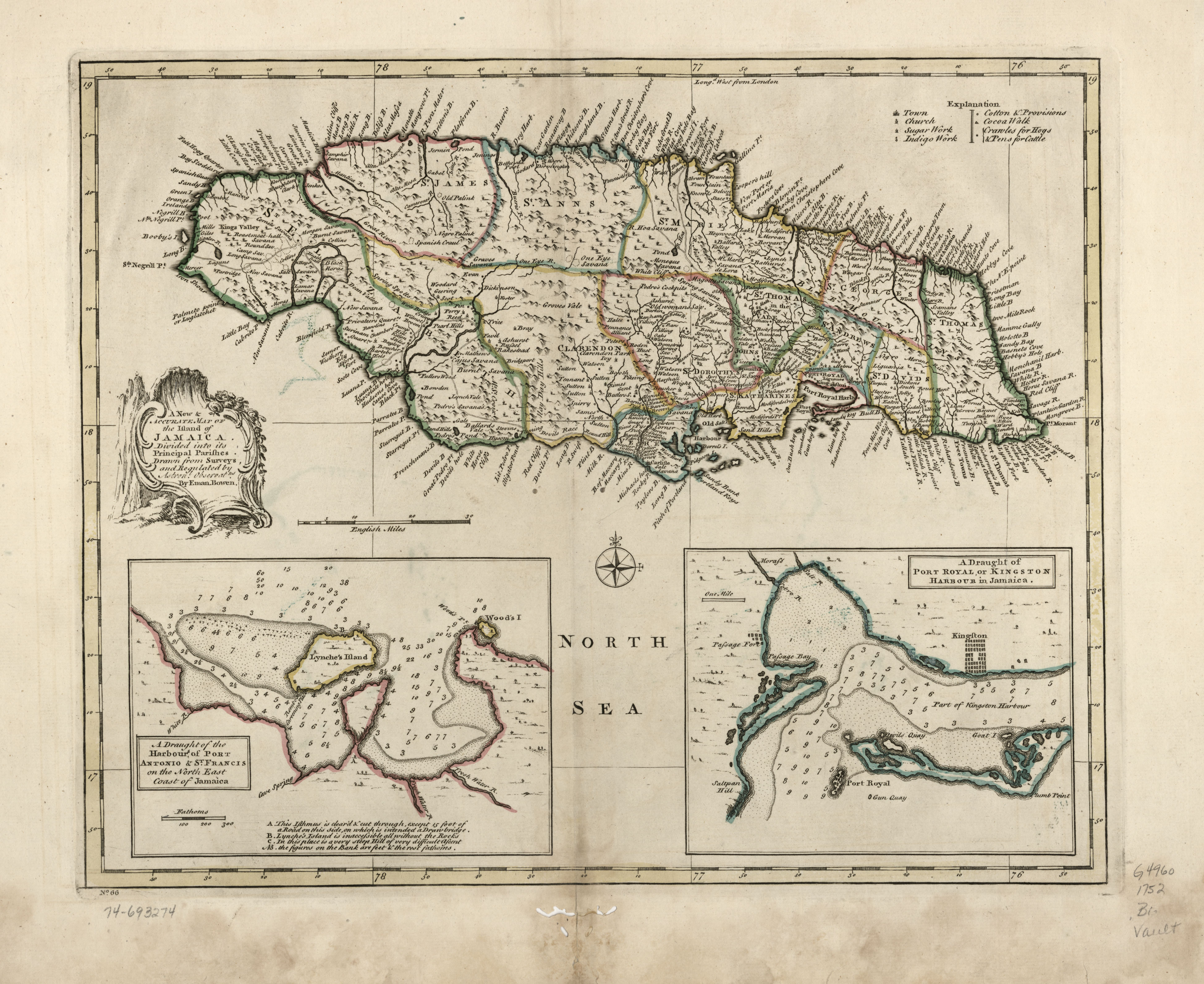
A New & Accurate Map of the Island of Jamaica. Divided into its Principal Parishes. Emanuel Bowen, 1752.

Saint John Parish was one of the historic parishes of Jamaica created following colonisation of the island by the British. It was in the centre of the island in Middlesex County but was abolished in 1866 when it was merged into Saint Catherine Parish.
