= Kingston and St. Andrew Corporation =

Administrative division in Jamaica

Kingston and St. Andrew Corporation arms

The Kingston and Saint Andrew Corporation (KSAC) is a unit of local government in Jamaica. It was formed in 1923 when the parishes of Saint Andrew and Kingston were administratively merged. It is divided into 15 Political Constituencies, which are further subdivided into 40 Electoral Divisions.
