= George Marshall (New Zealand cricketer) =

New Zealand cricketer

Personal information
- Born: 1863; Scotland
- Died: 1 July 1907 (aged 43–44); Christchurch, New Zealand
- Source: Cricinfo, 17 October 2020

George Marshall (1863 – 1 July 1907) was a New Zealand cricketer. He played in seventeen first-class matches for Canterbury and Hawke's Bay from 1888 to 1902.
