= List of presidents of the Legislative Council of Jamaica =

The following is a list of presidents of the Legislative Council of Jamaica.

== List of presidents of the Jamaican Council ==
| Name | Entered office | Left office |
|---|---|---|
| General Edward D'Oyley, Governor and President | 1661 | |
| Colonel Thomas Lynch | 1664 | |
| Major-General James Bannister | 1671 | |
| Colonel Hender Molesworth | 1674 | |
| Sir Francis Watson | 1688 | |
| John White | 1691 | |
| John Bourden | 1692 | |
| Peter Beckford | 1702 | |
| Francis Rose | | |
| John Ayscough | 1722 | |
| John Gregory | 1735 | 1751 |
| Archibald Sinclair | 1774 | |
| Thomas Iredell | 1775 | 1796 |
| John Palmer | 1797 | |
| Thomas Wallen | 1798 | |
| John Scott | 1805 | |
| Nathaniel Beckford | 1806 | |
| John Lewis | 1811 | |
| George Pinnock | 1821 | |
| George Cuthbert | 1825 | |
| William Rowe | 1838 | |
| James Gayleard | 1840 | |
| John Salmon | 1856 | |

== List of presidents of the Legislative Council of Jamaica ==
| Name | Entered office | Left office |
|---|---|---|
| The Governor for the time being | 1866 | 1893 |
| J.C. Philippo | 1893 | 1893 |
| et. seq. the Governor for the time being | 1893 | 1945 |
| Sir Noel Livingston | January 9, 1945 | June 10, 1952 |
| Major Aldington George Curphey, M.B.E. | June 13, 1952 | November 28, 1958 |
| Richard Walter Youngman, C.B.E. | December 12, 1958 | March 15, 1962 |
| Clifford Clarence Campbell | May 8, 1962 | 1962 |

This position was succeeded by the President of the Senate of Jamaica.
