= Surrey County, Jamaica =

Historic county of Jamaica

Coordinates: 18.05°N 76.54°W

Surrey
- County
- Country: Jamaica
- County town: Kingston
- Established: 1758
- Named for: Surrey, England

Area
  - Total: 2,009.3 km^{2} (775.8 sq mi)

Population
  - Total: 823,689

Map of parishes and counties. The county of Surrey is shown in yellow.

Surrey (also Surry) is the easternmost and the smallest by area of the three historic counties into which Jamaica is divided. It was created in 1758, and is divided into four parishes.

== History ==
Jamaica's three counties (Surrey, Middlesex and Cornwall) were established in 1758 to facilitate the holding of courts along the lines of the British county court system. Surrey was named after the English county in which Kingston upon Thames is found. Kingston was its county town.

== Parish ==
Surrey County
On map	Parish	Area km^{2}	Population; Census 2011	Capital
11	Kingston Parish^{(1)} ^{(2)}	21.8	96,052	Kingston
12	Portland	814.0	80,205	Port Antonio
13	Saint Andrew^{(1)}	430.7	555,828	Half Way Tree
14	Saint Thomas	742.8	91,604	Morant Bay
	Surrey County	2,009.3	823,689
	Jamaica total	10,990.5	2,607,631	Kingston

^{(1)} Kingston Parish and Saint Andrew Parish together form Kingston and St Andrew Corporation.
^{(2)} Kingston Parish does not encompass all of Kingston.
