= Saint Dorothy Parish, Jamaica =

Coordinates: 17.9400°N 77.0886°W

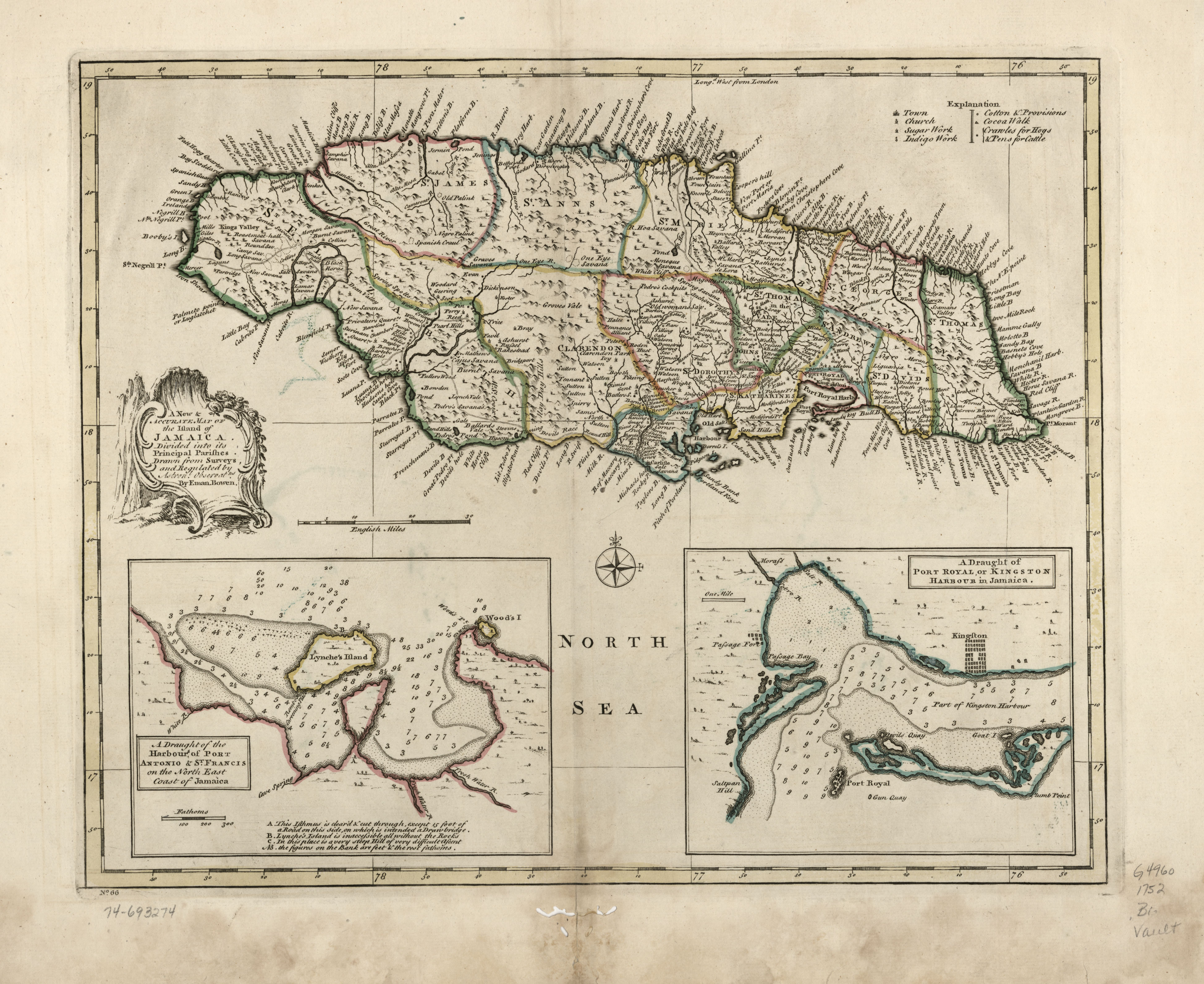
A New & Accurate Map of the Island of Jamaica. Divided into its Principal Parishes. Emanuel Bowen, 1752.

Saint Dorothy Parish was one of the historic parishes of Jamaica created following colonisation of the island by the British. It was on the south side of the island in Middlesex County to the west of Port Royal and Kingston but was abolished in 1866 when it was merged into Saint Catherine Parish.
