= George Marshall (Victoria cricketer) =

Australian cricketer

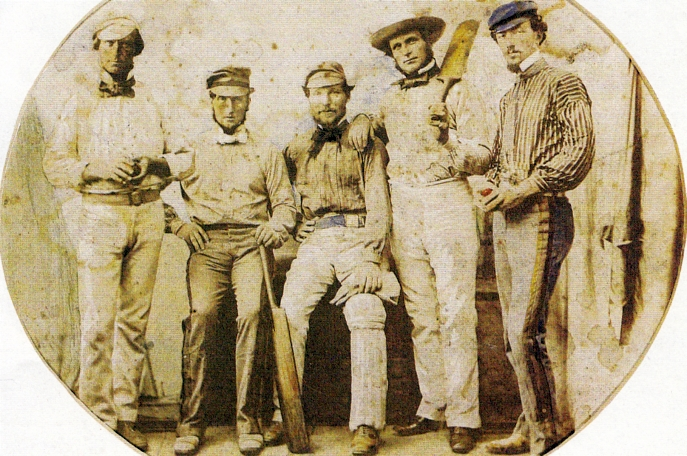
- George Marshall (center)

Personal information
- Born: 20 December 1829; Nottingham, England
- Died: 6 March 1868 (aged 38); Melbourne, Australia

Domestic team information
- Years: Team
- 1857-1864: Victoria
- Source: Cricinfo, 2 May 2015

George Marshall (20 December 1829 – 6 March 1868) was an Australian cricketer. He played eleven first-class cricket matches for Victoria between 1857 and 1864.

== See also ==
- List of Victoria first-class cricketers
