= George Nedham =

George Nedham (Needham) was a supporter of the Royalist cause during the English Civil War who, following their defeat at the Battle of Worcester in 1651, emigrated to the West Indies. First he went to Antigua, and later migrated to Jamaica. Here he married the daughter of Governor Thomas Modyford and became a prominent planter in the colony.

In 1677 he was returned, alongside Fulke Rose, as a representative of Saint Thomas in the Vale Parish in the House of Assembly of Jamaica.

== Family ==
In 1660 he married his first wife, Mary Bryan, daughter of William Bryan. Together they had seven sons of whom three survived:

- Robert Needham (1672-1738)
- William Needham (1675-1746)
- Edward Winter Needham (1683-1722), married Martha Lewis in 1708

They also had three daughters:

- Henrietta
- Mary
- Elizabeth Grace, who married John Ellis jr. with whom she had four children.
