= Kingston Parish =

Parish of Jamaica

Coordinates: 17°58′N 76°48′W

Kingston Parish Kgn
- Parish
- Kingston in Jamaica
- Country: Jamaica
- County: Surrey
- Capital: Kingston

Area
  - Total: 22 km^{2} (8.5 sq mi)
  - Rank: 14

Population (2011)
  - Total: 89,057
  - Density: 4,000/km^{2} (10,000/sq mi)

Kingston Parish is one of the 14 Parishes of Jamaica. It is part of the amalgamated municipal unit of Kingston and St. Andrew Corporation along with the neighbouring St. Andrew Parish. Its seat is the city of Kingston, the national capital. Spread over an area of 22 km^{2} (8.5 sq mi), it is the smallest of Jamaica's parishes and had a population of 89,057 in 2011.

== History ==
Kingston was established on the Liguanea Plain to house survivors of the Port Royal earthquake in 1692. It became a parish through an official resolution in the Jamaican Assembly in 1693. In 1872, the city of Kingston was formalised as the national capital, succeeding Spanish Town. In 1923, the amalgamated municipal unit of Kingston and St. Andrew Corporation was established by combining Kingston with the neighbouring St. Andrew Parish.

== Geography ==
Kingston is one of the 14 Parishes of Jamaica. With a total land area of 22 km^{2} (8.5 sq mi), it is the smallest parish. It lies on the Liguanea alluvial plain, adjacent to Kingston Harbour, and is sheltered by the Palisadoes sand spit. The Blue Mountains rise north of the parish with a steep elevation gradient.

The area consists of three electoral constituencies–Kingston Western, Kingston Central, Kingston Eastern and Port Royal, which incorporate downtown Kingston, and the neighbourhoods of Tivoli Gardens, Denham Town, Rae Town, Kingston Gardens, National Heroes Park, Bournemouth Gardens, Norman Gardens, Rennock Lodge, Springfield, and Port Royal, along with portions of Rollington Town, Franklyn Town, and Allman Town. As it incorporates the national capital, it houses the national legislature, ministries, diplomatic missions and other offices.

== Demographics ==
Kingston Parish had a population of 89,057 as per the 2011 census. The population is broadly diverse with predominately Afro-Jamaican, and other minorities including Indians, Chinese, Hispanics, and mixed heritage individuals.

== Culture and economy ==
The region is a commercial and tourism hub, and includes financial institutions, business process outsourcing, museums, and cultural landmarks. The region is the birthplace of reggae music. It hosts the Kingston Harbour, Jamaica’s chief maritime gateway and Norman Manley International Airport.
