= Vere Parish, Jamaica =

Parish in Jamaica

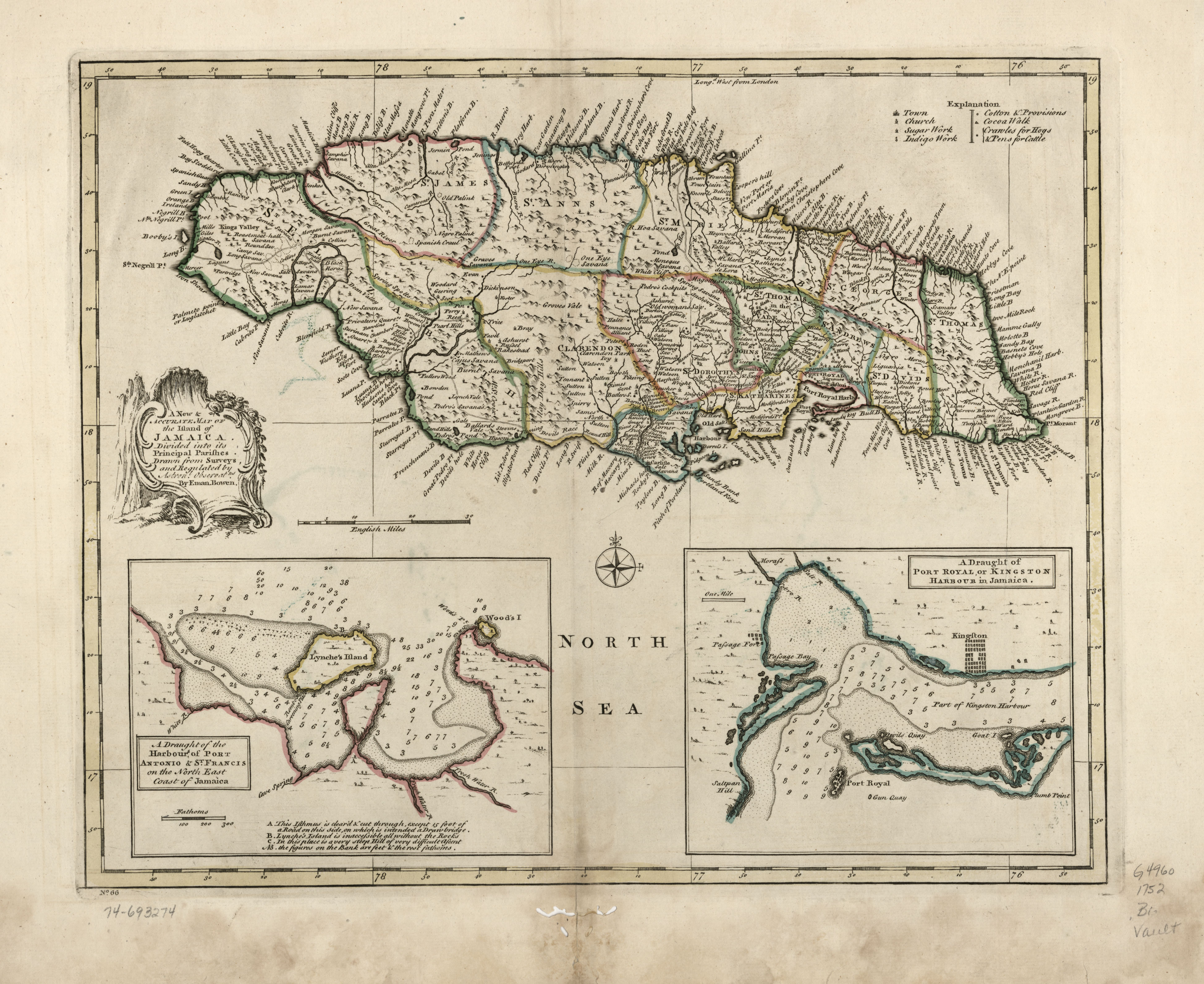
A New & Accurate Map of the Island of Jamaica. Divided into its Principal Parishes. Emanuel Bowen, 1752.

Vere Parish was one of the historic parishes of Jamaica created after the colonization of the island by the British Empire. It was in the south of the island in Middlesex County but was abolished in 1866 when it was merged into Clarendon Parish.
