= Saint George Parish, Jamaica =

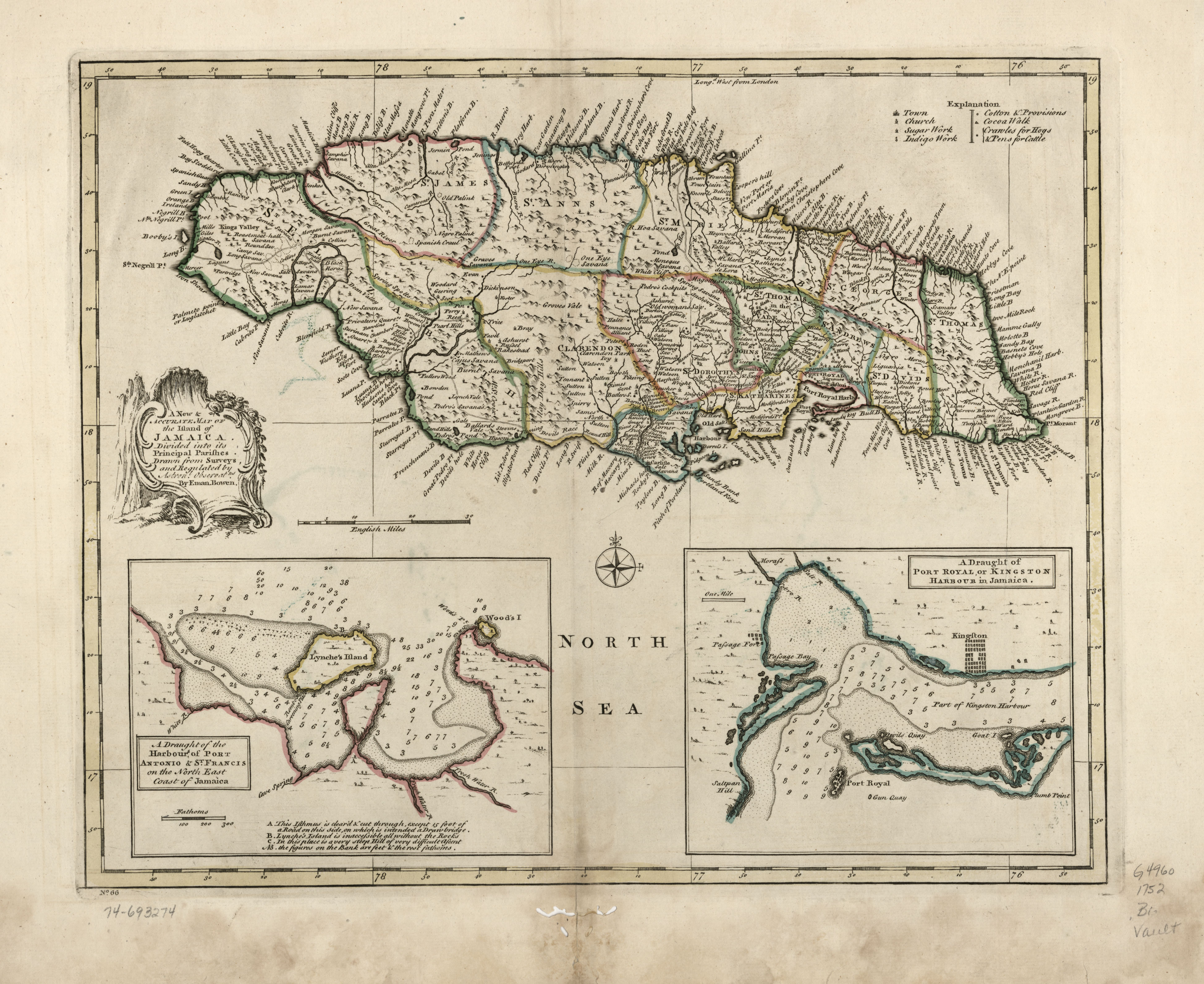
A New & Accurate Map of the Island of Jamaica. Divided into its Principal Parishes. Emanuel Bowen, 1752. (Saint George Parish top right)

Saint George Parish was one of the historic parishes of Jamaica created following colonisation of the island by the British. It was on the north side of the island in Surrey County but was abolished in 1866 when it was divided between Saint Mary and Portland parishes.
