= Saint Catherine Parish =

Parish of Jamaica

Saint Catherine Sint Cyatrine
- Parish
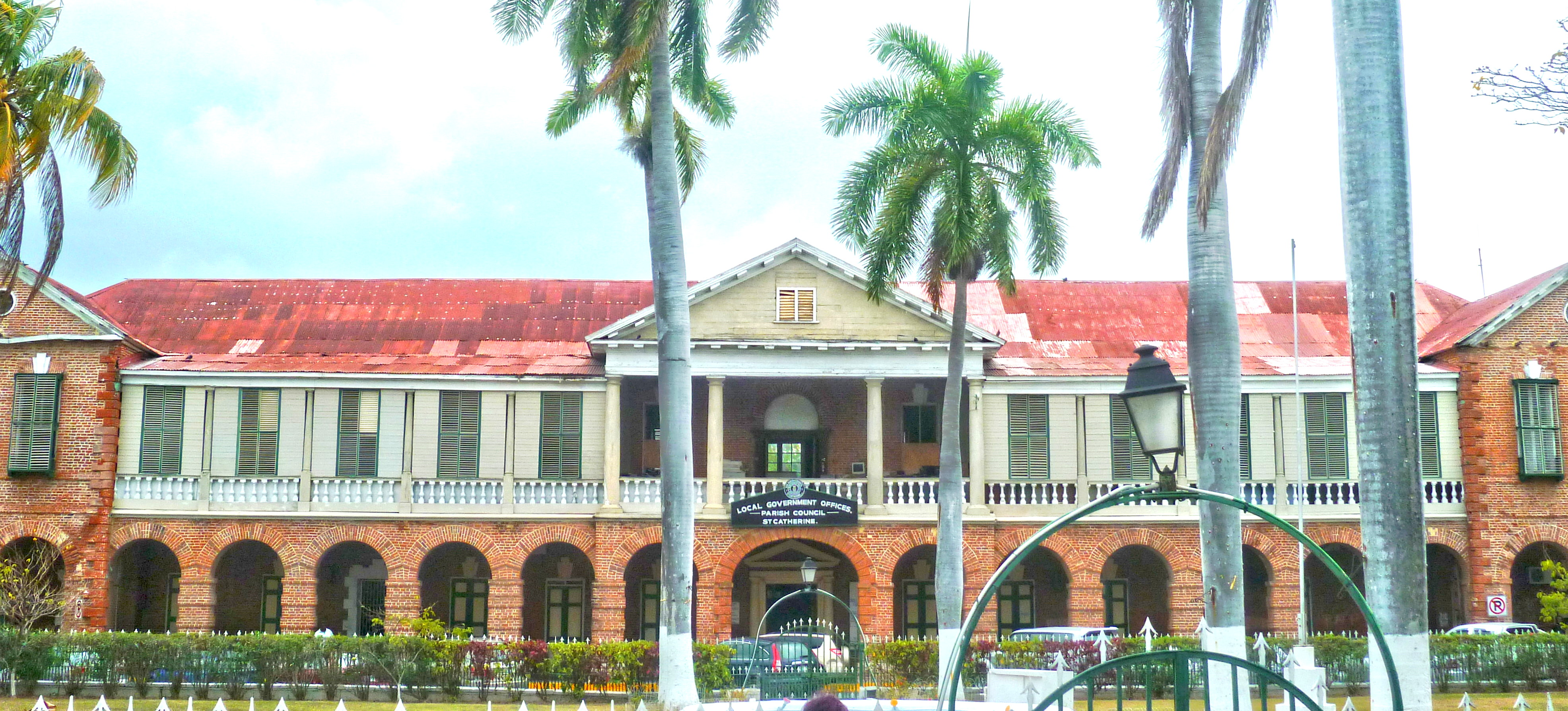
- St Catherine Parish Council offices

- Saint Catherine in Jamaica
- Country: Jamaica
- County: Middlesex
- Capital: Spanish Town
- Other towns: Portmore, Old Harbour, Ewarton, Linstead

Area
  - Total: 1,192 km^{2} (460 sq mi)
  - Rank: 2

Population (2012)
  - Total: 518,345
  - Density: 434.9/km^{2} (1,126/sq mi)

Saint Catherine (Jamaican Patois: Sint Cyatrine) is a parish in the south east of Jamaica. It is located in the county of Middlesex, and is one of the island's largest and most economically valued parishes because of its many resources. It includes the first capital of Jamaica, Spanish Town, originally known as San Jago de la Vega or Santiago de la Vega (St. James of the Plain).

== History ==
The modern boundaries of St. Catherine were decided in 1867 when four smaller parishes were amalgamated. The historic parishes of Saint Dorothy Parish, Saint John Parish and Saint Thomas in the Vale Parish, Jamaica were merged with the historic parish of Saint Catherine.

== Geography and People ==
St Catherine is located at 18°N 77°W. It is bordered by St Andrew in the east, Clarendon in the west, and by St Mary and St Ann in the north. It has an area of 1,192 km^{2}, making it one of Jamaica's largest parishes and it is one of the fastest growing parishes in the nation and has the largest economy out of all fourteen parishes. Except for the Hellshire Hills near the coast, the south of the parish is virtually flat. The central and northern sections are very mountainous, however; the northern border is on Mount Rosser, which crosses over into St Ann, the highest point being 686 metres (2,251 ft).

A plain of approximately 230 square kilometres (57,000 acres) occupies the southern part of the Rio Cobre basin. The Rio Cobre is the only river that runs along the southern plain. It provides water to irrigate over 73 square kilometres (18,000 acres) on the plain.

== Commerce ==
=== Development ===
Out of all the parishes (with the exception of Kingston Parish and Saint Andrew Parish) Saint Catherine shows the most potential for urban development. With its good water resources, virtually flat landscape, and nearness to the capital, it could possibly be one of the Caribbean's major urban areas in the next few years.

=== Agriculture ===
Agriculture remains the main source of employment in the parish. There are many small farmers who practice mixed farming; crops such as bananas, coconuts, pineapple, citrus, pumpkins, peppers, coffee and callaloo are planted for both domestic and commercial purposes. The larger properties produce sugar cane, bananas and citrus mainly for export. Dairy farms are also found in the parish. One of these is a 4.0 square kilometres (1,000 acres) farm in Old Harbour. The Salt Ponds District between Spanish Town, Port Henderson and Passage Fort is noted for the fine fish especially calipers.

=== Manufacturing ===
St Catherine is second only to Kingston as an industrial center. Industrial plants are some of the biggest employers in the parish. Spanish Town has the largest salt producing plant in the Caribbean, while Jamaica Milk Products, an affiliate of the Nestlé organization, has a factory in Bog Walk, another major town in the parish. The largest power plant in the island and several factories are located in Old Harbour. Twickenham Park, near Spanish Town, is another industrial estate with mainly light industries including cigarettes, carpets, batteries, ackee, plastic items, medical and pharmaceutical products.

=== Tourist sites ===
- Jamaica's emancipation Square can be found in Spanish Town. This is the only Georgian square in Jamaica. Kings House and the House of Assembly on the west and east sides, respectively, were erected in 1762. The Courthouse was built in 1819 and used as a chapel and armory with the Town Hall upstairs.
- The Rio Cobre River and Gorge is one of the largest in the island. Sinking at a place called River Sink at Worthy Park, it runs underground for nearly six kilometres, then surfaces at River Head Grand Cave in St Thomas-in-the-Vale. Before entering the gorge it is joined by a number of tributaries, such as the Thomas River, the Rio D'Oro and the Rio Pedro. In the early 1770s, a road was opened through the gorge. The Flat Bridge was originally constructed of logs, which were washed away in a flood. The present bridge was built and it has withstood countless floods. A marker can be found, which shows where the water rose to over 25 feet (7.6 m) above the bridge in 1933. An apocryphal story is that at noon, on every Good Friday, for a short period of time the ghosts of all the slaves who drowned in the river can be seen.
- Caymanas Race Track, Jamaica's most famous race track, is in St Catherine.
- St Clair Cave, one of Jamaica's more famous caves, is found in the parish. This large, complex cave contains one of the most notable bat roosts on the island, and is one of the few known historical sites for the possibly extinct bat, Phyllonycteris aphylla. Because of the biological importance of the system, and the inherent dangers involved in exploring it (i.e. noxious gases, histoplasmosis, Cutaneous larva migrans, difficult footing), casual visitation is discouraged.
- Hellshire Beach is located on the south coast of Jamaica in St. Catherine Parish about 20 minutes away from Kingston. Not a tourist spot due to its distance from major hotels.

== Notable People; Cultural Figures ==
- Sister Mary Ignatius Davies (1921 – 2003) was a Sister of Mercy and inspirational music teacher known for her work at the Alpha Boys School, where she trained scores of internationally renowned ska, rocksteady and reggae artists, including Leslie Thompson, who went on to become the first black conductor of the London Symphony Orchestra.She was awarded the Badge of Honour for services to Jamaica.
- Joseph Hill (1949 – 2006) was the lead singer and songwriter for the highly influential and world renowned roots reggae vocal harmony group Culture, most famous for their work of a profoundly spiritual character, particularly their 1977 hit "Two Sevens Clash". Joseph Hill was born in Linstead, a town in Saint Catherine Parish.

== Government and infrastructure ==
The Rio Cobre Correctional Centre of the Department of Correctional Services, Jamaica is located in Spanish Town, Saint Catherine Parish.

== Politics ==
Saint Catherine Parish is represented in the Parliament of Jamaica by eleven single-member constituencies:

- Saint Catherine Central
- Saint Catherine East Central
- Saint Catherine Eastern
- Saint Catherine North Central
- Saint Catherine North Eastern
- Saint Catherine North Western
- Saint Catherine South Central
- Saint Catherine South Eastern
- Saint Catherine South Western
- Saint Catherine Southern
- Saint Catherine West Central

== See also ==
- Above Rocks
- Charles II of England
- Jamaicans of Spanish descent
- Spaniard

== Sources ==
- Parish Information
- Statistical Institute of Jamaica
- Robertson, James, 2005, Gone is the Ancient Glory, Spanish Town Jamaica 1534-2000, Kingston, Jamaica: Ian Randle Publishers, ISBN 976-637-197-0
