= Middlesex County, Jamaica =

Historic county of Jamaica

Coordinates: 18.15°N 77.20°W

Middlesex
- County
- Country: Jamaica
- County town: Spanish Town
- Established: 1758
- Named for: Middlesex, England

Area
  - Total: 5,041.9 km^{2} (1,946.7 sq mi)

Population
  - Total: 1,183,361

Map of parishes and counties. The county of Middlesex is shown in pink.

Middlesex is the central of the three historic counties into which Jamaica is divided. It has no current-day administrative significance. It covers 5,041.9 km^{2} and has a population of 1,183,361 (about 45% of the island's area and population) giving it the largest area and population of the three counties. It includes Spanish Town, the island's original capital.

== History ==
Jamaica's three counties were established in 1758 to facilitate the holding of courts along the lines of the British county court system. Middlesex, the middle of the three, was named after an English county of the same name. It was chosen in Jamaica presumably because of its central position. Spanish Town was its county town.

== Parishes ==
Middlesex County
On map	Parish	Area km^{2}	Population; Census 2011	Capital
6	Clarendon	1,196.3	237,024	May Pen
7	Manchester	830.1	185,801	Mandeville
8	Saint Ann	1,212.6	166,762	Saint Ann's Bay
9	Saint Catherine	1,192.4	482,308	Spanish Town
10	Saint Mary	610.5	111,466	Port Maria
	Middlesex County	5,041.9	1,183,361
	Jamaica total	10,990.5	2,607,631	Kingston
