= Peter Beckford (junior) =

Jamaican politician, merchant and planter (1672/3–1735)

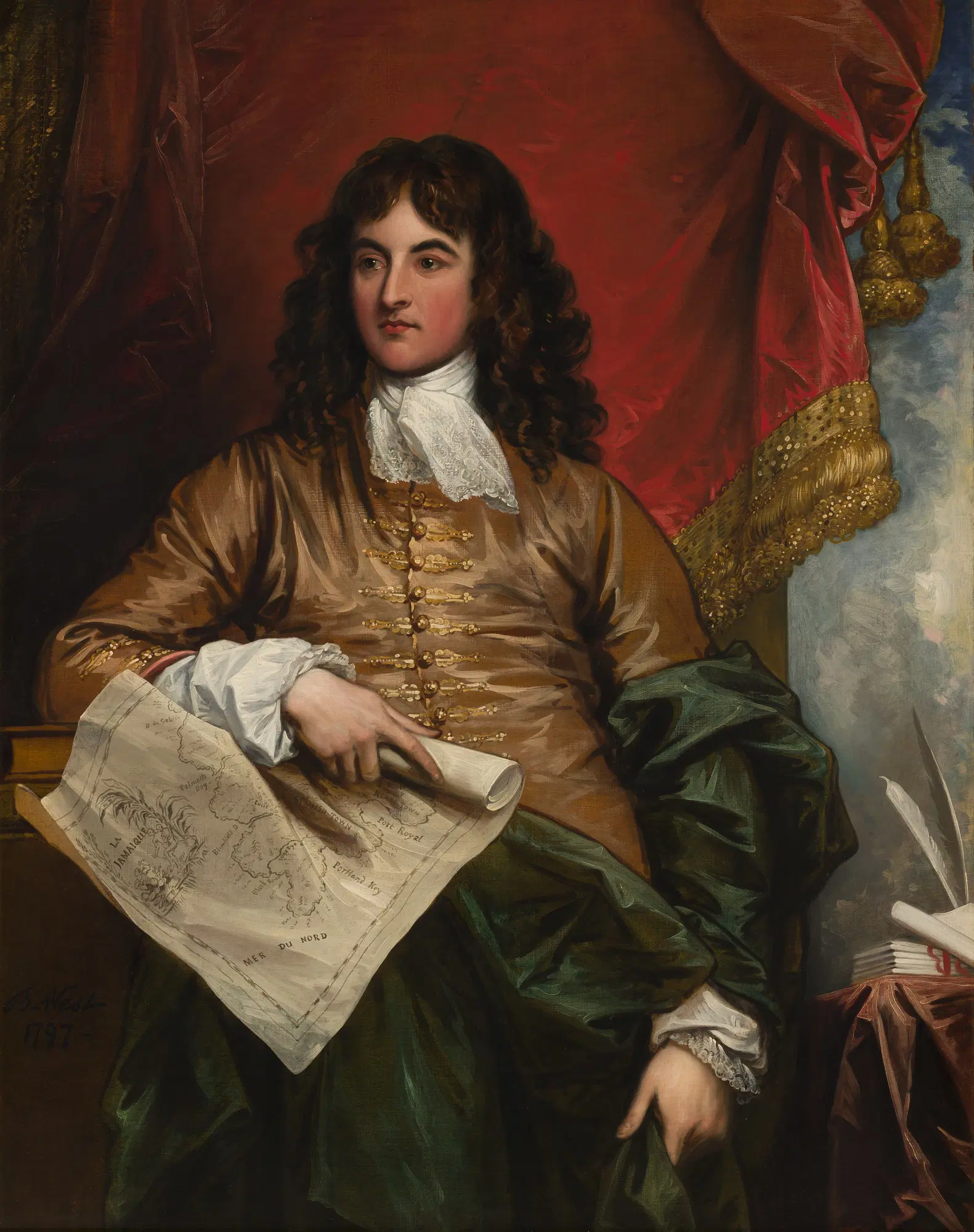
- Portrait by Benjamin West, 1797

Speaker of the House of Assembly of Jamaica
- In office 1707–1713
- Monarch: George I
- Preceded by: Matthew Gregory
- Succeeded by: Hugh Totterdell

Speaker of the House of Assembly of Jamaica
- In office 1716–1717
- Monarch: George I
- Preceded by: John Blair
- Succeeded by: William Nedham

Personal details
- Born: c. 1672/3 Jamaica
- Died: 3 April 1735 (aged 62) Spanish Town, Jamaica
- Spouse: Bathshua Hering
- Children: 13
- Parent(s): Peter Beckford; Anne Ballard

Peter Beckford (c. 1672/3 – 3 April 1735) was a Jamaican politician, merchant and planter who served as speaker of the House of Assembly of Jamaica from 1707 to 1713, and again from 1716 to 1717. Beckford was the son of Colonel Peter Beckford, a merchant and militia officer who served as the acting lieutenant-governor of Jamaica in 1702. Beckford's father sent him to study in England, where he was educated at the Merchant Taylors' School and New College, Oxford before being called to the bar in 1695. Quickly returning to Jamaica, Beckford was appointed as the Receiver General of Jamaica in 1696. However, he fled the colony in 1697 after killing another official, but eventually returned after his father managed to get the case declared nolle prosequi.

Beckford continued his political career after House of Assembly to Jamaica, being elected to the House of Assembly of Jamaica in 1701 and sitting in the house for three decades. Twice serving as speaker of the house, Beckford engaged in successive disputes with several governors of Jamaica, including Thomas Handasyd, Lord Archibald Hamilton and Sir Nicholas Lawes. His most prominent dispute was with Hamilton, with the two engaging a pamphlet war from 1714 to 1717 that was extensively covered by the London press. Thanks in part to assistance from his relatives in England, Beckford eventually won the dispute. From 1722 to 1729, he served as a deputy to the writer William Congreve, who had been appointed to a variety of Jamaican offices in 1714.

Having dispatched his political enemies, Beckford continued expanding his business holdings and political influence in Jamaica. Having inherited most of his father's estate, Beckford's economic and political successes led him to achieve social pre-eminence among the British-Jamaican elite, with even his political rivals admitting to his fame and wealth; thanks to his legal training, Beckford also worked as a banker and lawyer for many of his fellow planters. Having married a woman named Bathshua Hering and had nine children with her, Beckford died in 1735 in Spanish Town and in his will gave most of his estate to his family and their dependents. Modern historians have made generally positive assessments about Beckford's political and mercantile acumen.

== Early life ==
Peter Beckford was born in the English colony of Jamaica in c. 1672/3. His father, also named Peter Beckford, had emigrated from England to Jamaica during the 1660s, finding work as a merchant. The elder Beckford eventually entered into a political and military career, rising to the rank of colonel in the colonial militia and serving as the acting lieutenant-governor of Jamaica in 1702. By 1710, his vast estate included 20 sugar plantations, 1,200 slaves and £1,500,000 in bank stock, making him one of the wealthiest people in the British Empire. Beckford's mother was Anne Ballard, who had married his father shortly after the death of the elder Beckford's first wife, Bridget, in 1671. Beckford had two brothers and two sisters, who were also Anne's children.

Beckford was sent to England as a young man, studying at the Merchant Taylors' School and New College, Oxford before being called to the bar in 1695. He soon returned to Jamaica and was appointed as the Receiver General of Jamaica in 1696. On 13 December 1697, Beckford murdered the Jamaican politician Samuel Lewis by stabbing him to death with Lewis' own sword. In an effort to avoid prosecution, Beckford fled to France, where he wrote a petition to William III, claiming that he had killed Lewis in a duel and was at most guilty of the crime of manslaughter. The families of Beckford and Lewis then "went to work" over Beckford's potential prosecution; though no pardon was given due to fierce opposition from Lewis' family, after Beckford's father went to London to defend him the case was officially declared nolle prosequi in 1698.

== Political career ==
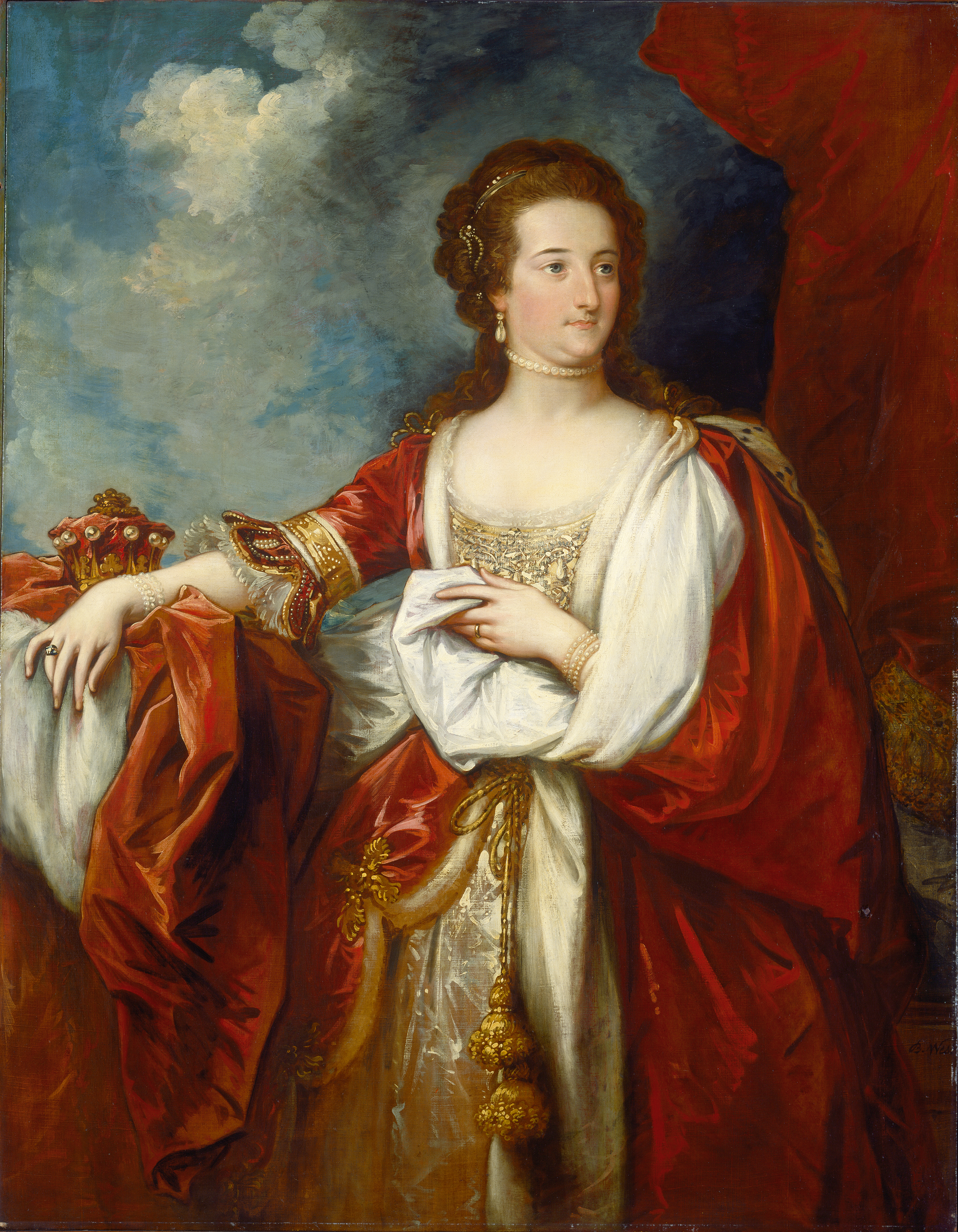
1797 portrait of Beckford's daughter Elizabeth by Benjamin West

Once Beckford received news of the declaration, he returned to Jamaica and continued his career in politics. In 1701, Beckford was elected to serve in the House of Assembly of Jamaica at the colonial capital of Spanish Town, where he would sit consistently for almost three decades. Six years later, Beckford was appointed as the new speaker of the House of Assembly, holding the office until 1713. On 3 April 1710, a discussion in the House of Assembly grew heated to the point where Beckford attempted to adjourn the house, to which a group of assemblymen responded by barring the chamber's doors and drawing their swords on Beckford, forcing him to reoccupy the speaker's chair at swordpoint. Beckford's father, hearing of what had occurred, attempted to rescue his son but died of a stroke in the process.

Having "weathered the storm of 1710", Beckford succeeded to his father's estate as one of the most powerful and influential men in Jamaica, with the historian Perry Gauci describing him as "every bit as resourceful and determined" as his father. He proceeded to engage in a series of disputes with several colonial governors, including Thomas Handasyd, Lord Archibald Hamilton and Sir Nicholas Lawes, in an effort to ensure Beckford's political influence was not curtailed by the governors. Beckford, whose political rivals claimed that he had "a better estate in Jamaica than the Governor and Council... were all their estates computed together", publicly identified himself as the leader of the populist "country" faction in the House of Assembly, which contested the pro-governor "court" faction for political influence.

From 1714 to 1717, Beckford and his political allies engaged in a pamphlet war in both Jamaica and Great Britain with Hamilton, which was extensively covered by the London press. Hamilton began the dispute by claiming that Beckford had engaged in acts of profiteering and his family members were involved in corruption. In response, Beckford claimed that Hamilton had overstepped his authority and attempted to use his office to intimidate Jamaica's colonists into submission. Beckford was assisted during the dispute by William Beckford, a family relative and naval contractor who "maintained the family's prominence in the City [of London]". Though Beckford won when Hamilton was sent back to England, the affair led British observers to conclude that Jamaica was a "factious and unpredictable colony".

During this period, Beckford was appointed to the office of comptroller of customs in the colony, and again served as speaker of the House of Assembly from 1716 to 1717, when he was succeeded by William Nedham. In 1722, Beckford began serving as a deputy to the English writer William Congreve, who in December 1714 had been appointed to a variety of Jamaican offices, most prominently as secretary of Jamaica, thanks to the influence of Congreve's patron Charles Montagu, 1st Earl of Halifax. As his deputy, Beckford charged fees paid to the holder of Congreve's offices at twice the statutory rate, partly so he could send remittances to Congreve to repay him for being appointed deputy and partly for his own personal gain. Congreve eventually returned to Great Britain and died in London in January 1729, with Beckford continuing to send remittances to his successor, John Anthony Balaguier. Balaguier continued serving as secretary of Jamaica until his death in 1764.

== Mercantile career and death ==
After his victory over Hamilton, Beckford continued to expand both his business holdings and political influence in the colony, "becoming a feared opponent in Jamaican circles and gaining riches that aroused the admiration of European observers." Having acquired the majority of his father's estate in the elder Beckford's will and testament, Beckford established a vast commercial empire which eventually resulted in him owning "the largest property real and personal of any subject" in Europe and its colonies. Through a combination of mortgage defaults and shrewd purchases, Beckford expanded the family estates to the total and partial ownership of at least 16 sugar plantations along with total ownership of at least five cattle pens, a farm, one storehouse and 1,737 slaves. Much of Beckford's estate was located in Westmoreland Parish and the family centre of Clarendon Parish. His wealth yielded Beckford "many dependants, which gives him such a sway in assemblies."

Beckford's political and economic successes resulted in him achieving social pre-eminence among the British-Jamaican elite, with even his political rivals admitting to his fame and one commentator dubbing him "the God of the Creolians". In addition to serving as a banker for many in the colonial elite, Beckford's earlier legal training at the English Inns of Court allowed for him to serve as an attorney and trusted confidante for his fellow planters, most of whom lacked Beckford's legal expertise. Among white Jamaicans, the "country natives" of the colony, it was widely perceived that "for the good of [Beckford's] children 'tis impossible for him to do anything but what is the true interest of the country." From 1714 onwards, the successes of Beckford's fellow planters combined with the Peace of Utrecht, which ended the War of the Spanish Succession, led to a period of economic stability in Jamaica. By 1720, Beckford owned a West Indiaman named Beckford after himself.

At some point in his life, Beckford married Bathshua Hering, having nine children: Peter, William, Richard, Nathaniel, Julines, Francis, Ellis, Bathshua and Elizabeth. In either 1718 or 1723, Beckford sent the young William to England to study at Westminster School in Westminster, London, as Jamaica suffered from a lack of educational institutions at the time. In 1730, Beckford entered into a business partnership with the Scotsman Alexander Grant, who had worked as a physician and surgeon after emigrating to Jamaica. Grant subsequently acquired 300 acres of land in Saint Elizabeth Parish from Beckford, and went on to acquire more landholdings in the parishes surrounding Saint Catherine Parish and the city of Kingston, Jamaica. As part of the partnership, the two men leased a storehouse together, using it to sell supplies to local plantation owners. Beckford also introduced Grant to his future wife Elizabeth, the daughter of a Bristol-born planter, in 1734.

Near the end of his life, Beckford, aware of "the inherent difficulties of settling a transatlantic empire", appointed Thomas Beckford, a relative of his who worked as a merchant in London, and George Ellis, a Jamaican justice of the peace, as the executors of his estate. On 3 April 1735, Beckford died in Spanish Town at the age of 62. After his death, Beckford's massive estate was extensively reported on by the London press, with The Gentleman's Magazine estimating his fortune at a sum which according to Gauci rivaled "estates of the greatest landowners among the British nobility." Through his financial activities and ownership of sugar plantations and other types of real estate, Beckford had acquired by the end of his life an estate worth approximately £300,000 (equivalent to £56,180,370 in 2025), which consisted of land, slaves, luxury goods, mortgage-backed securities, bonds and open bank accounts. He died as one of the richest subjects in the whole British Empire.

== Legacy ==
In his will, which was proved on 6 October 1735, Beckford gave 1,000 pounds and a plantation to Hering and varying sums of money and property to his children and their offspring. He also instructed that his bookkeeper be given an annual salary and stipulated that Diego, one of Beckford's slaves, be manumitted and given 10 pounds per annum along with 10 acres of land.Aware of the lack of schools in Jamaica, which was "often identified as the root cause of the island's sociocultural failures", Beckford bequeathed 1,000 pounds to the establishment of a free school for the poor in Spanish Town. Such bequests were common among British West Indian planters of the late 17th and 18th centuries, who attempted to imitate the tradition of noblesse oblige as practised by their elite counterparts in England. However, as noted by Canadian historian Joan Coutu even if such schools were actually built they mostly "languished with few pupils until the end of the eighteenth century."

William returned to Jamaica after Beckford's death, abandoning his medical studies in England to help manage the family estate. Though Beckford had left most of his estate to Peter, the latter's premature death in 1737 resulted in Peter's estate passing on to William. In Jamaica, William was appointed to several government offices and served as a colonial agent for Jamaica in the Parliament of Great Britain, along with being elected to the House of Assembly in 1737. He returned to England in December 1744 without informing the house, and entered into British politics alongside Richard and Julines. All three sat in the House of Commons of Great Britain, while William twice served as Lord Mayor of London in 1762 and 1769. Catherine eventually moved to England after Beckford's death and married the Earl of Effingham on 14 February 1745. Beckford's greatest legacy was arguably accumulating "an estate great enough to support his [children] in their British ambitions."

Historians have generally maintained a positive view of Beckford's mercantile and political acumen; according to academic Sidney Blackmore, he increased his family's wealth "on the firm foundations laid by the founding father." Similarly, historian Richard B. Sheridan wrote that Beckford was a "financier of great magnitude". Gauci held a more mixed view of Beckford, arguing his wealth was a "testament to... commercial acumen and sheer ruthlessness". Historians have also given disparate assessments of his wealth; Trevor G. Burnard estimated that Beckford's estate was worth 500,000 pounds at his death. In the 1790s, Beckford's grandson William commissioned Benjamin West to paint a portrait of Beckford, which was intended to hang in William's country house of Fonthill Abbey. Although the portrait was reportedly a copy of one made during Beckford's lifetime, the drawings and studies done by West for the painting instead indicates that it was created from his imagination.
