= Vassall =

Vassall may refer to:

- Vassall (ward), a ward in the London Borough of Lambeth
- Vassall Tribunal, a public enquiry undertaken to investigate John Vassall's spying

== People with the surname ==
- Vassall (surname)
- John Vassall Jr. (1738–1797), American Loyalist who built the first iteration of the Vassall-Craigie-Longfellow House

== See also ==
- Henry Vassall-Fox, 3rd Baron Holland
- Vassal (disambiguation)
- Vassalboro, Maine
- Vassalli, a surname
