= Roger Shakespear =

18th-century British botanical collector

- Occupation: Botanical collector
- Years active: 1777-1782
- Employer(s): Joseph Banks; John Fothergill (physician)

Roger Shakespear also written as Roger Shakespeare (flourished 1777–1782) was a botanical collector. He is known to have collected specimens in South America, North America and Jamaica for Sir Joseph Banks (1743–1820) and Dr John Fothergill (1712–1780).

Roger Shakespear may also be the "Mr. Shakespear" recorded as collecting fish from Jamaica and sending them to the British Museum, where they were catalogued by Daniel Solander (1733–1782) in the 1760s. Some of these fish were then sent to the Faculty of Medicine at Montpellier by Pierre Marie Auguste Broussonet (1761–1807), then to the Musee d'Histoire Naturelle in Paris by 1828, where they were studied by Georges Cuvier (1769–1832) and Achille Valenciennes (1794–1865).

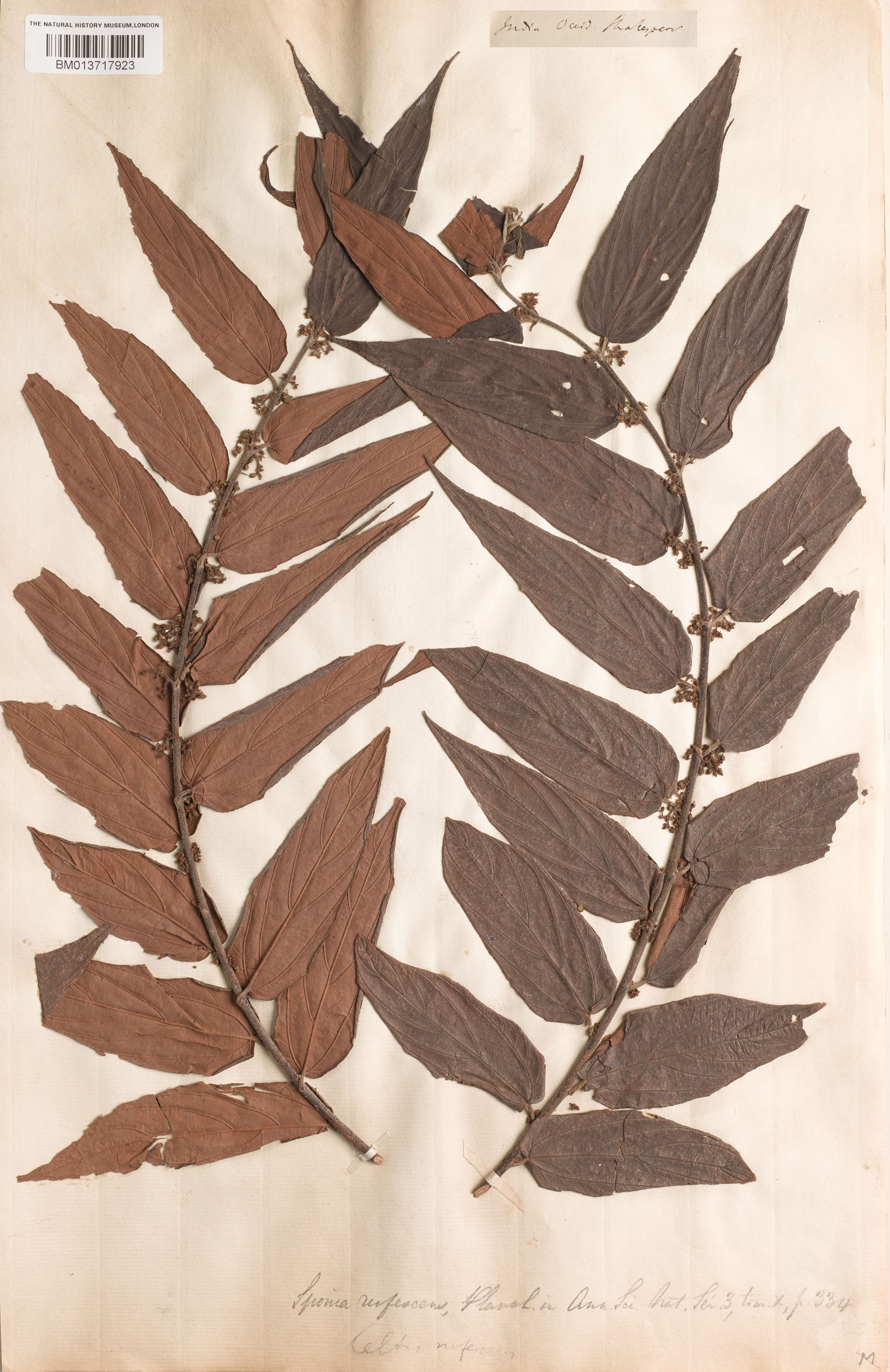
preserved specimen of Trema micranthum a.k.a. Jamaican nettletree, collected by Roger Shakespear in the West Indies (BM013717923)

Roger Shakespear contacted John Fothergill circa July 1777, seeking a plant-collecting assignment but needing £100 to fund it. Fothergill had high estimation of Shakespear's talent: "he will be able to collect specimens in perfection - and to send us the seed." Fothergill petitioned several friends, alongside himself, to each contribute a £20 stake to Shakespear's trip: James Lee (Scottish nurseryman and botanist, 1715–1795), William Malcolm (a London nurseryman, d. 1798), Dr William Pitcairn (botanist and physician at St Bartholomew's Hospital, 1712–1791) and Joseph Banks. [The £100 Shakespear needed for his expenses roughly equates to a modern value of £11,000 as of May 2024].

Shakespear can be placed in Jamaica in the year 1777 thanks to dated specimens he collected, e.g. Columnea hirsuta and Marcgravia brownei and the ferns Osmunda regalis and Hymenophyllum sericeum.

On 2 April 1779 Matthew Wallen of Jamaica wrote to Joseph Banks to say he had some plants ready for Shakespear, and was going to arrange Shakespear a passage to the Bay of Honduras.

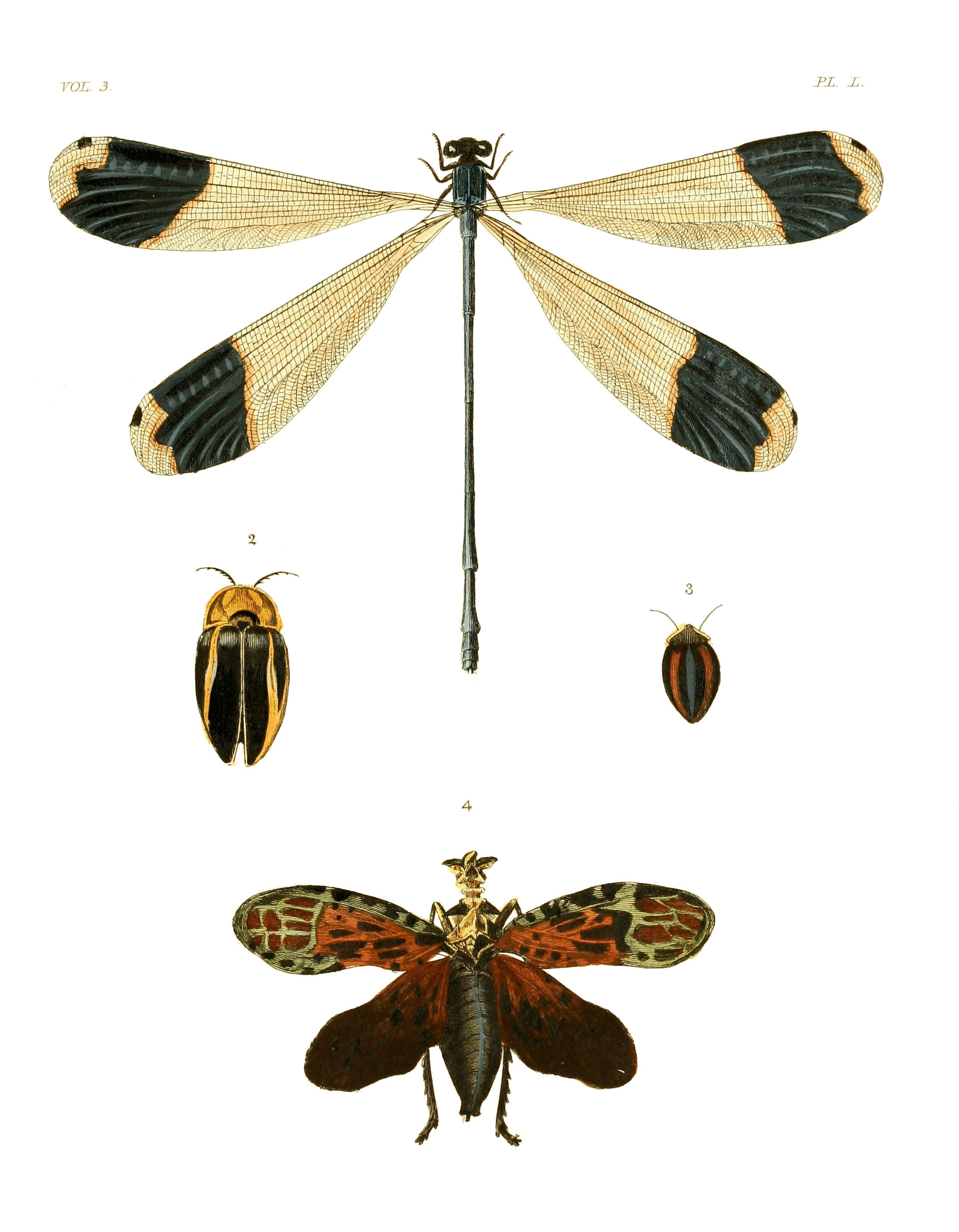
Dru Drury's illustration of Lestes caerulatus [now Megaloprepus caerulatus] (top), described from a specimen collected by Mr Shakespear at the Bay of Honduras

Perhaps relating to Shakespear's intention to travel to the Bay of Honduras in 1779, the entomologist Dru Drury (1725–1803) owned and described a specimen of a giant damselfly from the Bay of Honduras, number 79 in his cabinet, which he had labelled with its collector's name: "Libellula caerulata, Muskito Shore. Mr Shakespear, 1779." First described by Drury as Lestes caerulatus, this damselfly species is now known as Megaloprepus caerulatus (Drury, 1782).

Roger Shakespear is recorded as having collected the plants "purple spider-wort" [Tradescantia discolor, now known as Rhoeo discolor (L'Hér.)] and "yellow flower-fence" Guilandina moringa in Honduras in 1782, which were planted in the garden of Hinton East (d. 1792) at Liguanea, Jamaica. Hinton East was Receiver General of Jamaica and his botanical collections were later transferred to the Hope Estate, part of which eventually became the Hope Botanical Gardens.

== Legacy ==
Botanical specimens collected by Roger Shakespear are held in the collections of the Natural History Museum, London, National Museums Liverpool, and the Linnean Society of London, where they are part of the herbarium collection which once belonged to James Edward Smith (1759–1828).

== Note ==
=== Roger Shakespear, contemporary Naval Captain ===
A Captain Roger Shakespear of the Royal Navy appears in the historical record as active in the West Indies contemporaneously with Roger Shakespear the botanical collector. Captain Roger Shakespear was Regulating Captain for Kingston and the Windward Parishes, and was advertising to recruit men for an expedition by King's Proclamation in November 1779. Regulating Captains were employed to examine men impressed by press gangs, and were often elderly or had no prospect of going to sea themselves. However Roger Shakespear of the Jamaica Volunteers was an active participant in the San Juan Expedition, making contact with the St Blas Indians to seek assistance, and was later listed as having drowned on 7 April 1780. Roger Shakespear the botanical collector appears to have been alive and active until at least 1782.
