= Hugh Totterdell =

Member of the House of Assembly of Jamaica

Hugh Totterdell, sometimes Totterdale, was a member of the House of Assembly of Jamaica on multiple occasions and elected speaker of the house in 1706 and 1714.

== Career ==
Totterdell was a member of the assembly for Saint Catherine parish in 1701, 1704, 1707, 1714; Saint George 1703; Kingston 1711; Port Royal 1706; and Saint David 1709 and 1711.

He was expelled the House in 1704 for words spoken by him against the Lieut. Governor, Thomas Handasyd, viz. "that he desired that others might be called dog and rascal in their turns by the Governor, that he was not a time-server; that he had rowed against the stream, and had, or could, pull up against them all; and that the first good dinner the Governor had eaten in this Island, was at his house."

The above information was given to the House by colonel Richard Thompson, who was called to the Council, shortly after Totterdell was re-elected for Saint Catherine on a vacancy which occurred during the same year, but the House declared the election null and void, as he was not qualified to sit, having been previously expelled. He was elected at the next general election in 1706, for Saint Catherine, and Port Royal, and decided to serve for Port Royal. He was elected Speaker in 1706 and in 1714.

Totterdell was sued in the Grand Court by the attorney general Robert Hotchkyn for words spoken in the House whilst a member, and the House passed a resolution, voting it a breach of privileges, and ordered the attorney general to be taken into custody. To tide over the difficulties the Governor prorogued the House.

== See also ==
- List of speakers of the House of Assembly of Jamaica
