= Broughtonia =

Broughtonia may refer to:

- Broughtonia (bush cricket), a genus of insects in the tribe Platycleidini
- Broughtonia (plant), a genus of orchids
