= Thomas Sutton (Jamaican politician) =

Thomas Sutton (c.1638 - 15 November 1710) was the speaker of the House of Assembly of Jamaica in 1691-92 and 1698.

== Early life and family ==
Sutton was born around 1638, the younger son of a Barbadian planter and arrived in the 1660s or 70s.

He married Judith.

== Career ==
He came to own one of the largest and finest plantations in Jamaica, Sutton's Plantation in Clarendon Parish but in 1690 600 Enslaves rebelled led By Prince Naquan who would become the Father of the future maroon leaders. The slaves who escaped from his plantation established a branch of the Jamaican Maroons at Cudjoe's Town (Trelawny Town). These Leeward Maroons, as they came to be called, were led by Cudjoe, whose guerrilla resistance eventually forced the governor, Edward Trelawny, to sue for peace and offer them a treaty in 1739.

A colonel in the Militia, he defeated an attack by the French led by Admiral Jean-Baptiste du Casse in 1694 at Carlisle Bay.

He was the speaker of the House of Assembly of Jamaica in 1691-92 and 1698.

== Death ==
Sutton died 15 November 1710 at the age of 72. His will is dated 1711 and is held by the British National Archives. He is buried at Vere Parish Church.

== See also ==
- List of speakers of the House of Assembly of Jamaica
