= Vassal (disambiguation) =

A vassal is a person regarded as having personal obligations to a landowner or monarch, in exchange for particular rights.

Vassal may also refer to:

- Vassal state, a state that is subordinate to another state
- Vassal Engine, a free software engine used for adapting boardgames to online play
- Vassal (surname)
- Vassal Gadoengin (c.1943 – 2004), Nauruan politician

== See also ==
- Vassall (disambiguation)
