= Edmund Kelly (Jamaican politician) =

Jamaican politician

Edmund Kelly was the speaker of the House of Assembly of Jamaica in 1719.

== See also ==
- List of speakers of the House of Assembly of Jamaica
