= James Bradshaw (Jamaican politician) =

James Bradshaw was the speaker of the House of Assembly of Jamaica in 1694.

== See also ==
- List of speakers of the House of Assembly of Jamaica
