= Peeke =

Peeke may refer to:

- Andrew Peeke (born 1998), American professional ice hockey defenseman
- John Peeke (died 1716), speaker of the House of Assembly of Jamaica
- Margaret Bloodgood Peeke (1838-1908), American traveler, lecturer, author
