= Edward Manning =

Edward Manning may refer to:

- Ed Manning (Edward R. Manning, 1944–2011), American basketball player
- Edward Manning (politician) (18th century), Jamaican politician
- Edward Manning (minister), Canadian Baptist minister, see Ingraham Ebenezer Bill

== See also ==
- Ned Manning, Australian playwright
- Manning
