= Jasper Hall =

Government official in 18-century Jamaica

Jasper Hall (died 1778) was the speaker of the House of Assembly of Jamaica in 1778.

He was also the Receiver General of Jamaica and the owner of the Hectors River plantation.

== See also ==
- List of speakers of the House of Assembly of Jamaica
