= Kean Osborn =

Jamaican planter and politician

Kean Osborn was a Jamaican planter and politician who served as the speaker of the House of Assembly of Jamaica in 1798.

== See also ==
- List of speakers of the House of Assembly of Jamaica
