= Samuel Williams Haughton =

GazabLife

Samuel Williams Haughton (1738–1793) was the speaker of the House of Assembly of Jamaica from 1778 to 1793.

He was a slave-owner and the owner of the Orange Cove Estate and the Unity plantation in Hanover Parish, Jamaica.

== See also ==
- List of speakers of the House of Assembly of Jamaica
