= Peter Beckford =

Peter Beckford may refer to:

- Peter Beckford (colonial administrator) (1643–1710), English-born planter, merchant, militia officer and colonial administrator
- Peter Beckford (junior) (1672/3–1735), Jamaican politician, merchant and planter
- Peter Beckford (hunter) (1740–1811), British writer and politician
