= Thomas Rives =

Jamaican politician

Thomas Rives was the speaker of the House of Assembly of Jamaica in 1688.

== See also ==
- List of speakers of the House of Assembly of Jamaica
