= Edward Stanton =

Edward Stanton may refer to:

- Edward Stanton (sculptor) (1681–1734), English mason and sculptor
- Edward Stanton (British Army officer) (1827–1907), British officer and diplomat
- Edward Stanton (politician) (died 1705), speaker of the House of Assembly of Jamaica, 1704
- Edward L. Stanton III (born 1972–present), United States attorney for the Western District of Tennessee and judicial nominee for the same district
