= Samuel Bernard (politician) =

Jamaican politician

Samuel Bernard was the speaker of the House of Assembly of Jamaica for 1679–88.

== See also ==
- List of speakers of the House of Assembly of Jamaica
