= Roger Handasyd =

Lieutenant-General Roger Handasyd
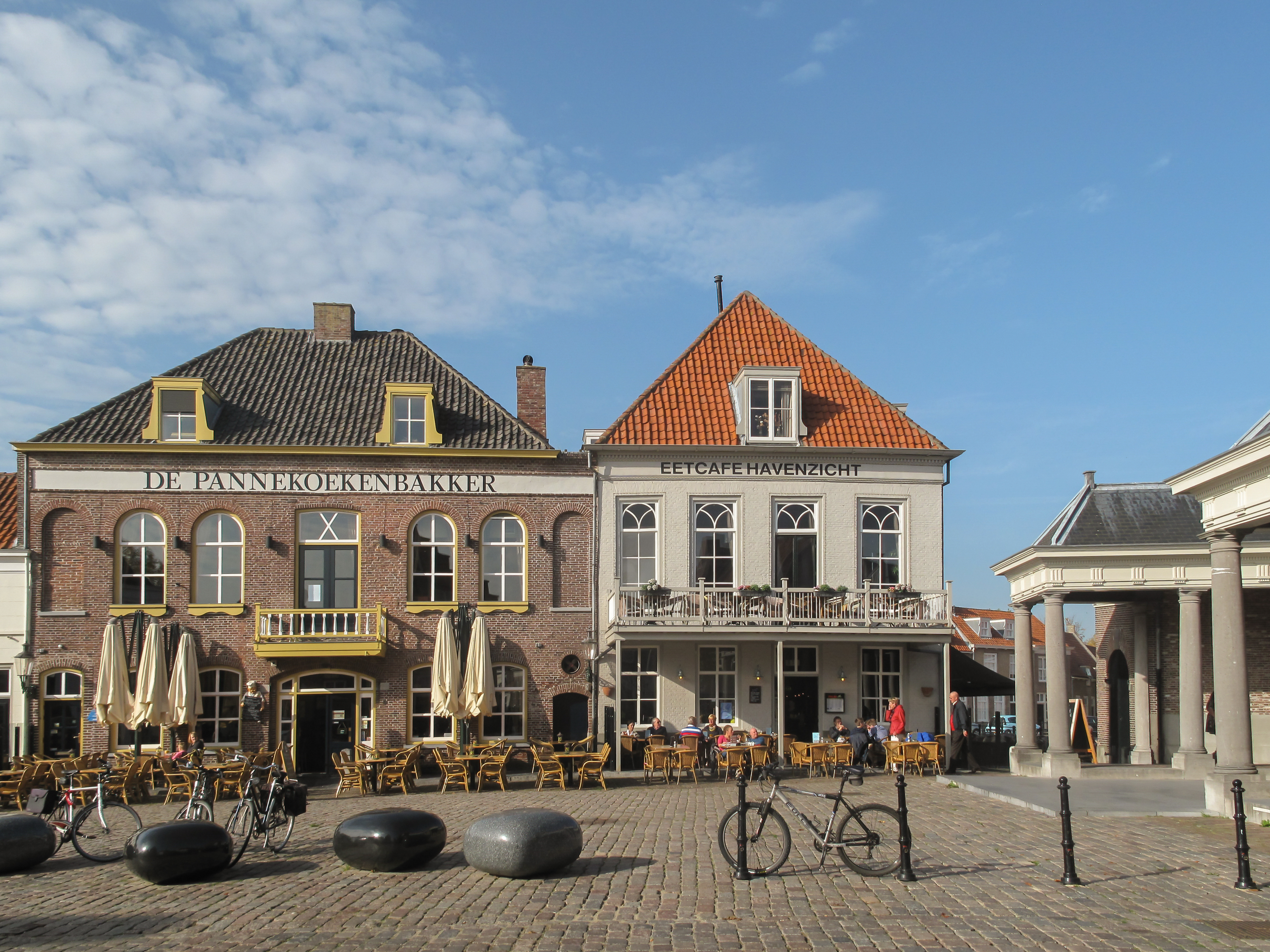
- Heusden, the Dutch port where Roger was born

Member of Parliament for Scarborough
- In office 1747–1754

Commander-in-chief, Scotland
- In office October 1745 – November 1745

Member of Parliament for Huntingdon
- In office 1722–1741

Personal details
- Born: 11 March 1689 (baptised) Heusden, Dutch Republic
- Died: 4 January 1763 (aged 73) Hanover Square, Westminster, London
- Resting place: St Andrews' Church, Great Staughton
- Party: Whig
- Spouse: Elizabeth Thorneycroft (1710–his death)
- Relations: Major-General Thomas Handasyd (1645–1729)
- Occupation: Soldier and politician

Military service
- Allegiance: Great Britain
- Branch/service: Army
- Rank: Lieutenant-General 1743
- Unit: Colonel; 22nd Foot 1712–1730; 16th Foot 1730–1763
- Battles/wars: War of the Spanish Succession; Jacobite rising of 1715; Jacobite rising of 1745

Lieutenant-General Roger Handasyd (or Handaside; 11 March 1689 – 4 January 1763) was an English military officer and Member of Parliament for different seats between 1722 and 1754.

Often cited as one of the longest serving officers in British military history, in reality he saw little active service. First commissioned in 1694 at the age of five, he was too young for the 1689-1697 Nine Years War and spent most of the 1701 to 1713 War of the Spanish Succession on garrison duties in Jamaica. Appointed colonel of the 22nd Foot in 1712, he transferred to the 16th Foot in 1730, a post he retained until his death in 1763.

Described by a contemporary as a 'bitter Whig', he entered Parliament in 1722 for Huntingdon, a seat he held until 1741. At the outbreak of the Jacobite rising of 1745, he briefly succeeded Sir John Cope after the Battle of Prestonpans as Commander-in-chief, Scotland. In early November, he entered Edinburgh unopposed and was replaced by Henry Hawley in early January 1746.

He re-entered Parliament in 1747 as MP for Scarborough before retiring in 1754, and died in London on 4 January 1763.

== Personal details ==
Although the family originally came from Elsdon, Northumberland, his father Thomas Handasyd (ca 1645-1729) was an officer in the Dutch Anglo-Scots Brigade, who married the daughter of a Dutch merchant, Anna Morel (died 1704). Roger was born in 1689 in the Dutch town of Heusden, the eldest survivor of six children; his siblings included Thomas (1692-1729), William (1693-1745), Clifford (1695-1772) and Anne (1697-1777).

In 1710, he married Elizabeth Thorneycroft (1689-1773) but they had no surviving children; he died in London on 4 January 1763 and was buried in St Andrews, parish church of Great Staughton near Gaynes Hall, purchased by his father in 1717.

== Career ==
In 1694, Thomas Handaysd was promoted major in the newly-formed 28th Foot, while Roger was appointed ensign in the same unit. Commissions were then considered private assets and although it was becoming less common, there were no age restrictions. As in this instance, they could be used to reward deserving officers or to provide pensions for the families of those killed in action; Handaysd's contemporary Henry Hawley was commissioned at the age of nine, after his father died at the Battle of Steenkerque in 1692. As was customary, Handasyd's duties were performed by a third party, in this case a William Wamlesse.

Handasyd attended Westminster School, where one of his classmates was Sir John Cope; too young for the 1689 to 1697 Nine Years War, he spent most of the War of the Spanish Succession on garrison duty in Jamaica, where his father was Governor. After he retired in 1712, Roger took over his position as Colonel of the 22nd Foot before returning to England in 1714. During the Jacobite rising of 1715, his unit occupied Oxford, a measure apparently considered necessary because it was the Royalist capital in the First English Civil War.

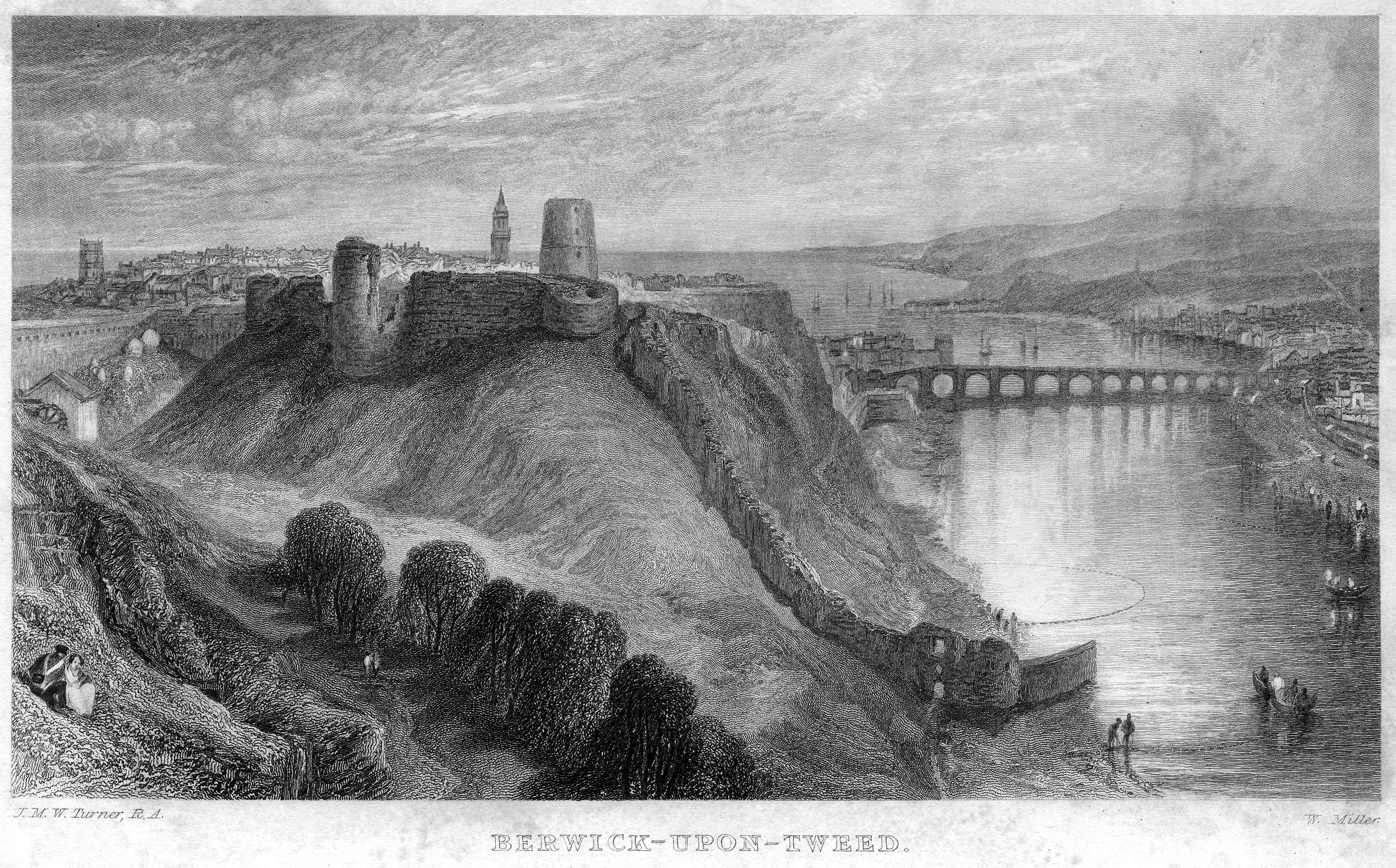
19th century engraving of fortress at Berwick-upon-Tweed; Handasyd was appointed Governor, shortly before the Jacobite rising of 1745

In the 1722 British general election, he was elected Member of Parliament for Huntingdon, a constituency near Great Staugham controlled by the Whig Earl of Sandwich; although he rarely spoke, he was a reliable supporter of the Walpole administration. In 1730, he purchased the colonelcy of the 16th Foot in 1730 and in 1737 was appointed Lieutenant-Governor of Fort St. Philip, Menorca; records show he was paid £2,500 per annum for these positions.

Handasyd lost his seat in the 1741 British general election, when the Earl of Sandwich withdrew his support for Walpole. One of the consequences was a series of investigations into alleged corruption, including absenteeism and neglect of Menorca; while many such positions were sinecures and accepted as such, Menorca was an important naval base and absenteeism an ongoing problem. Although Handsyd was criticised for never spending any time there, he managed to shift much of the blame to Philip Anstruther, Lieutenant Governor of Menorca.

Although his regiment served in the War of Jenkins' Ear and the War of the Austrian Succession, he did not accompany it. He became Lieutenant General in 1743, based on time served; this made him eligible for command, but there were far more generals than positions and many never held an active post. When the Jacobite rising of 1745 began in August, most of the regular army was in Flanders; Handasyd was sent to the border fortress of Berwick-upon-Tweed, which became a key position after the government defeat at Prestonpans in September. When Sir John Cope arrived in Berwick, he was relieved of command and as senior officer, Handasyd became Commander-in-Chief, Scotland. General Wade, commander at Newcastle, instructed him to establish a supply base at Berwick and obtain information on rebel movements.

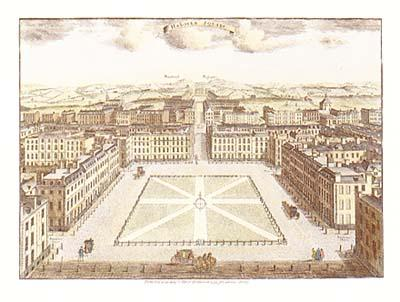
Hanover Square, ca 1750 where Handasyd rented a house; he died here on 4 January 1763

The Jacobites spent the next month in Edinburgh debating strategy, before marching into England on 6 November; ordered to re-occupy it, Handasyd did so with what Wade considered excessive caution but he entered the town on 14 November without opposition. The Jacobites reached Derby before returning to Scotland in late December; Handasyd's brief spell in command ended when Henry Hawley arrived in Edinburgh on 5 January and took over as Commander-in-Chief. After the Rising was defeated in April, Hawley was replaced by the Earl of Albemarle, complaints by Handasyd he should have been appointed instead were ignored.

The Whigs had split into two factions and in the 1747 British general election, he was returned as MP for Scarborough, a seat controlled by the Earl of Carlisle, part of the smaller Patriot Whig grouping. In 1749, he became a Council member of the Free British Fishery Society, a group set up to revive the British deep-sea herring fishery, which was then dominated by the Dutch. In 1751, Handasyd made a rare speech in Parliament defending the Duke of Cumberland; he later wrote to the Prime Minister, the Duke of Newcastle, asking for a 'better regiment' but his request was rejected. At the 1754 British general election, he stepped down from Parliament, despite having been offered his old seat of Huntingdon. He died at his London residence in Hanover Square on 4 January 1763.

== Sources ==
- Guy, Alan (1996). Chandler, David (ed.). The Army of the Georges in The Oxford History Of The British Army (2002 ed.). Oxford University Press. ISBN 978-0192803115.
- Dalton, Charles (1898). English army lists and commission registers, 1661-1714, Volume IV. Eyre & Spottiswoode.
- Handasyd, Roger (1741). Memorial of Lieutenant General Roger Handasyd, lieutenant governor of the castle of St Philip's, Minorca, on a dispute between himself between himself and Lieutenant General Anstruther, governor of Minorca, over stores for the garrison. HMSO. SP 41/48/146.
- Hoares Bank. "Manuscript of the Month September 2014" (PDF). Hoares Bank.
- Godfrey, Michael (1969). Handasyd, Thomas in 'The Dictionary of Canadian Biography, Volume 2'. Univ of Toronto Pr / Les Presses de L'Universite Laval.
- Guy, Alan (1985). Economy and Discipline: Officership and the British Army, 1714–63. Manchester University Press. ISBN 978-0-7190-1099-6.
- Guy, Alan (1996). Chandler, David; Beckett, Ian (eds.). The Army of the Georges in 'The Oxford History Of The British Army'. Oxford University Press. ISBN 978-0192803115.
- House of Commons (1742). The History and Proceedings of the House of Commons: 1740. HMSO.
- Harris, B (1999). "Patriotic commerce and national revival: the Free British Fishery Society and British politics, c. 1749-58". The English Historical Review. 114 (456): 285–313. doi:10.1093/ehr/114.456.285.
- Lea, R.S. (1970). "Handasyde, Roger (c.1684-1763), of Gaines Park, Great Staughton, Hunts". In Sedgwick, R. (ed.). The History of Parliament: the House of Commons 1715-1754 (Online ed.). Boydell and Brewer.
- "Major-Gen. Thomas Handasyd". Geneagraphie.com.
- Perry, Cambridgeshire. "The Manors of Gaynes Hall, alias Gaynes Perry and Dillington". Perry, Cambridgeshire.
- Riding, Jacqueline (2016). Jacobites: A New History of the 45 Rebellion. Bloomsbury. ISBN 978-1408819128.
- Royle, Trevor (2016). Culloden; Scotland's Last Battle and the Forging of the British Empire. Little, Brown. ISBN 978-1408704011.
- Wood, Andrew B (2011). The Limits of Social Mobility: social origins and career patterns of British generals, 1688-1815 (PDF) (PHD). LSE.
- Yonge, Sir William (1740). A List of the Colonels, Lieutenant Colonels, Majors, Captains, Lieutenants and Ensigns of His Majesty's Forces. Thomas Cox.

Parliament of Great Britain
Preceded by Hon. Sidney Wortley-Montagu; Viscount Hinchingbrooke	Member of Parliament for Huntingdon; 1722–1741; With: Edward Wortley Montagu 1722–1734; Edward Montagu 1734–1741	Succeeded by Edward Montagu; Hon. Wills Hill
Preceded by William Osbaldeston; Edwin Lascelles	Member of Parliament for Scarborough; 1747–1754; With: Edwin Lascelles	Succeeded by Sir Ralph Milbanke; William Osbaldeston
Military offices
Preceded by Thomas Handasyd	Colonel, 22nd Foot; 1712–1730	Succeeded by William Barrell
Preceded by The Earl of Deloraine	Colonel, 16th Foot; 1730–1763	Succeeded by Hon. Robert Brudenell
Preceded by Sir John Cope	Commander-in-Chief, Scotland; 1745	Succeeded by Henry Hawley
