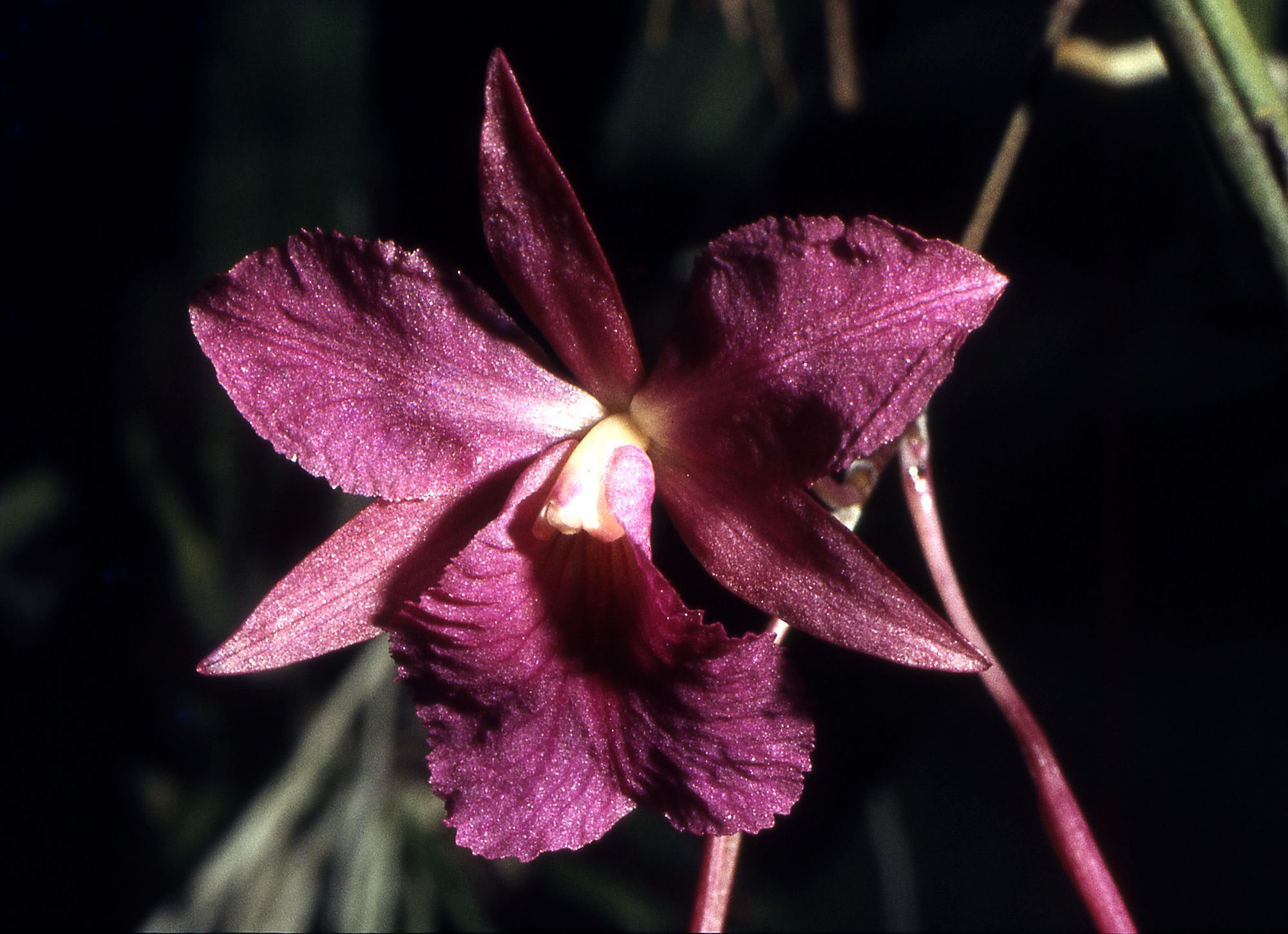

Scientific classification
- Kingdom: Plantae
- Clade: Tracheophytes
- Clade: Angiosperms
- Clade: Monocots
- Order: Asparagales
- Family: Orchidaceae
- Subfamily: Epidendroideae
- Genus: Broughtonia
- Species: B. sanguinea

Binomial name
- Broughtonia sanguinea (Sw.) R.Br. in W.T.Aiton

= Broughtonia sanguinea =

Blood red broughtonia

Species of orchid

Broughtonia sanguinea, also known as blood red broughtonia is a plant in the genus Broughtonia, a member of the family Orchidaceae. It was named in 1813 by its first describer, Robert Brown, for 18th century English botanist Arthur Broughton.

== Description ==
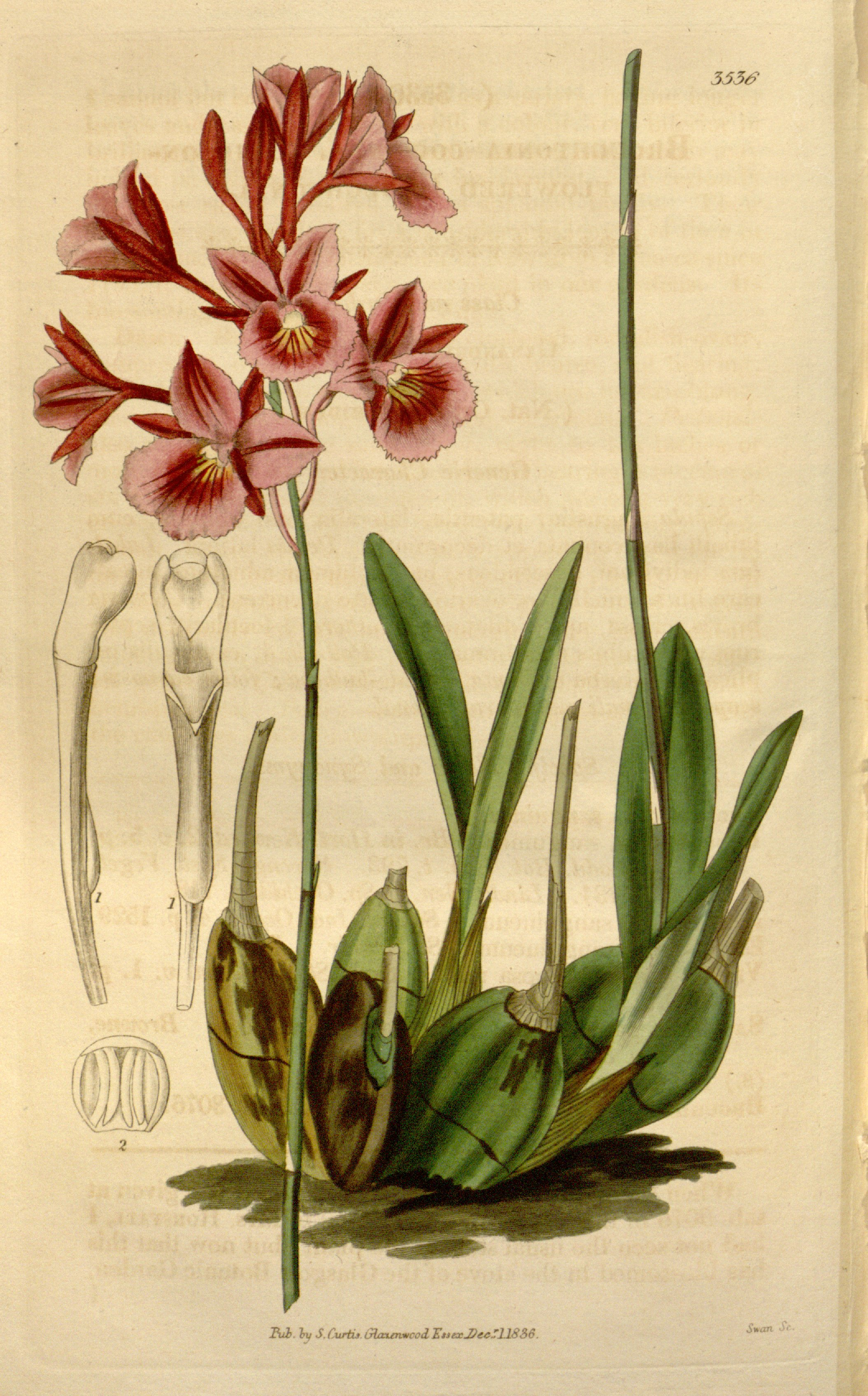
Illustration of Broughtonia sanguinea

Broughtonia sanguinea is a species native to Jamaica. Its small, egg-shaped and compact pseudobulbs measure from 2.5 to 5 centimeters in size. On the top of each pseudobulb, there are two 15–20 cm (6–8 in) long leaves. The leaves have a hard texture and do not break easily, and measures to be about 15–25 mm (1/2–1 in) wide. The flower spikes grow to 60 cm (2 ft) and produces long, clustered red flowers 25–50 mm (1–2 in) in size. The spikes are able to bloom for several months and the plant is able to bloom twice per year or more.

=== Flowers ===
The flowers are typically red and flower in the late winter to spring and a hint of yellow at the base. The flowers are produced on long arching spikes (inflorescences) that emerge from the top of the pseudobulbs. Each spike bears up sixteen or more flowers. Plants prefer comparatively warm to hot growing conditions (25 - 35 Celsius) and about 70% humidity and brightly lit conditions of approximately 25,000 - 30,000 lux.

== Distribution ==
Broughtonia sanguinea are found in Jamaica from 0 to 800 meters. .

== Habitat and ecology ==
In nature, this plant is found growing in a wide range that is tolerant to varying light conditions. Near the shore it often is found in trees growing on limestone soils. In areas of higher rainfall it grows high up on branches on trees such as the Guango.

Broughtonia sanguinea prefers warm to hot temperatures; daytime highs of 29–35 °C (85–95 °F) and nighttime lows of 21–27 °C (70–80 °F) are acceptable winter temperatures. Summer temperatures can be a few degrees warmer. 70% or higher humidity is ideal for growth.

== Care ==
This plant can grow from 0.9–1.2 m (3–4 ft) from a 430-watt son agro bulb. Plants should be mounted on treefern or cork and prefer dry outs between waterings. It is best to use distilled water. Overwatering can cause several problems such as root rot and infectious bacteria/fungus in the potting medium. Provide high humidity and good air circulation. This plant does best under fluorescent or sodium lights for artificial light culture. This plant as well as its hybrids are susceptible to pesticides, and they can stop growing and defoliate rapidly. Allowing the plant to grow again is difficult, and they may sit around for about a year or two before doing anything, if they do not die first from gradual dehydration. This plant blooms when young and often will flower in a 50 mm (2 in) pot.

== Gallery ==
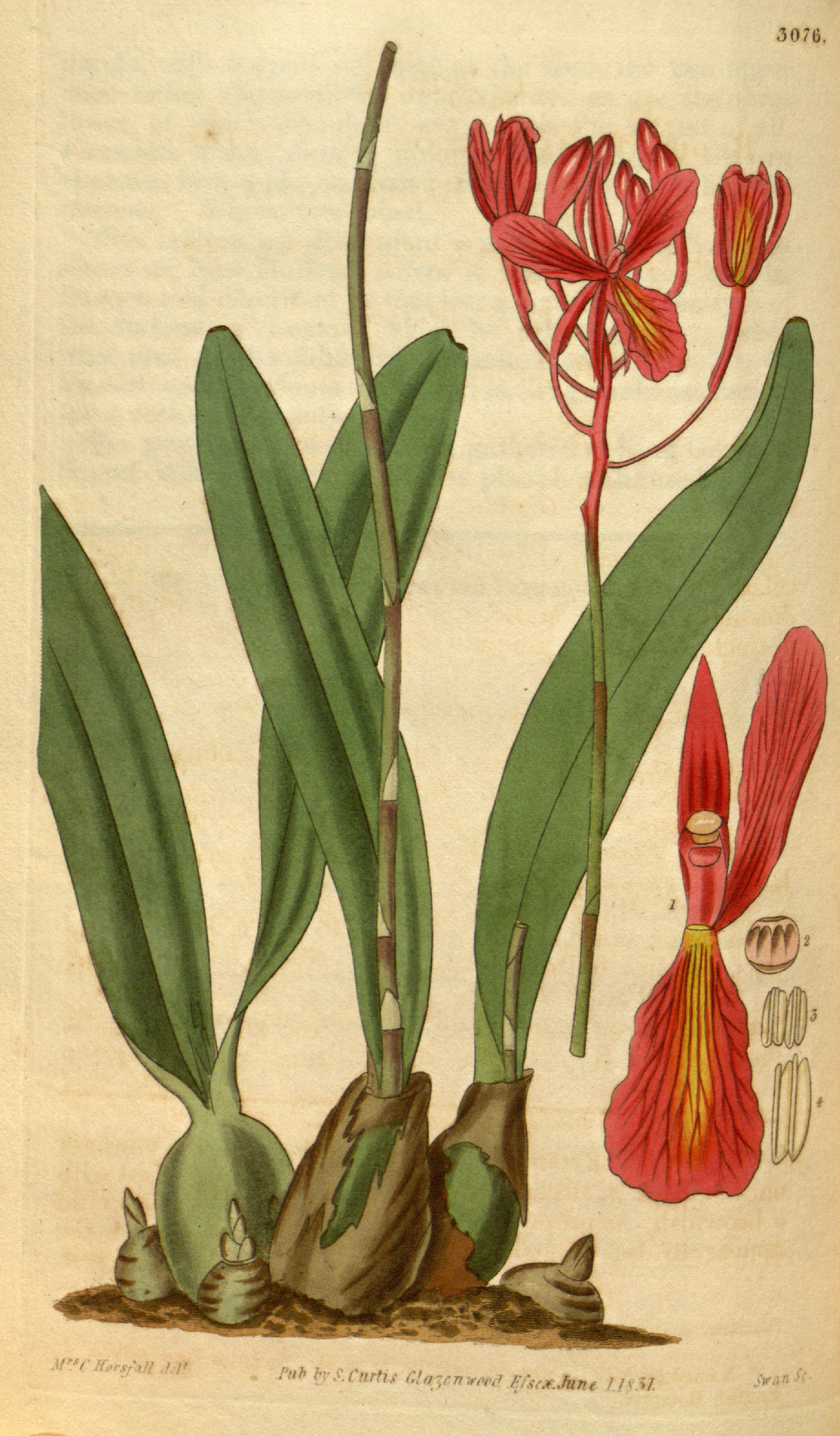
Broughtonia sanguinea

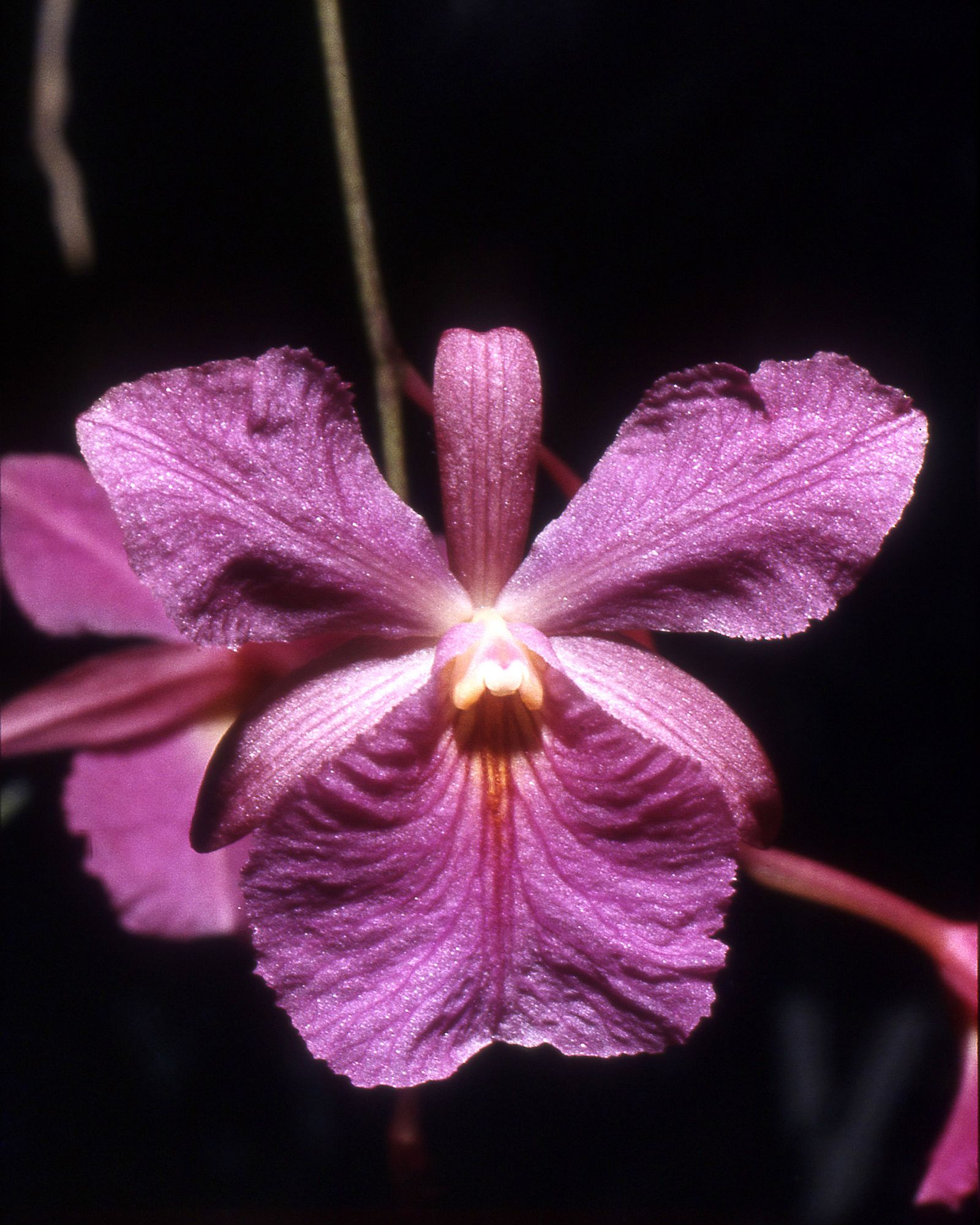
Broughtonia sanguinea

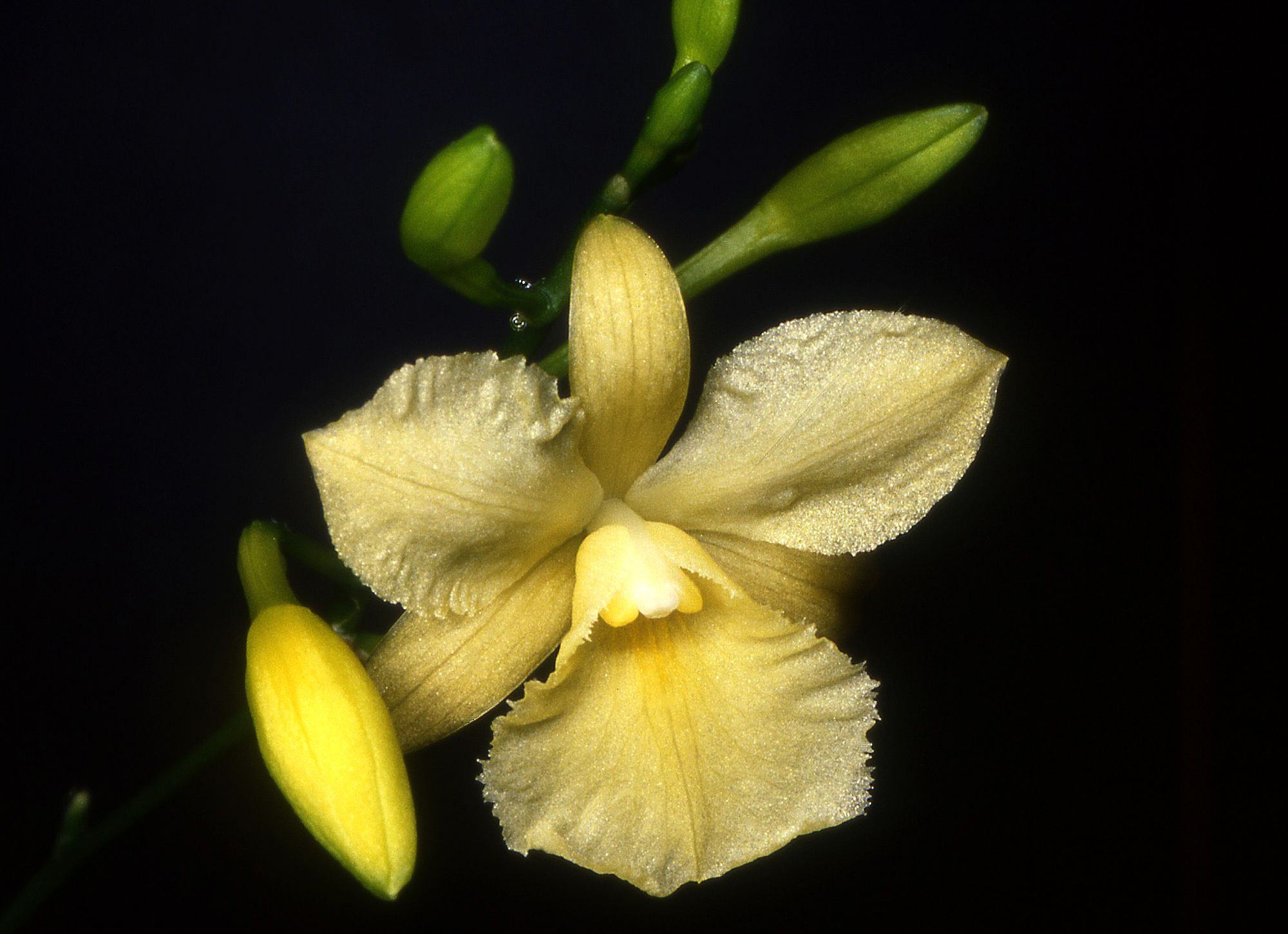
Broughtonia sanguinea var aureum

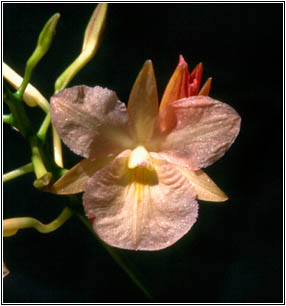
Broughtonia sanguinea - peach colored variety
