= Francis Melling =

Jamaican politician

Francis Melling was the speaker of the House of Assembly of Jamaica in 1725.

== See also ==
- List of speakers of the House of Assembly of Jamaica
