= William Nedham =

William Nedham may refer to:

- William Nedham (British politician) (c. 1740–1806)
- William Nedham (Jamaican politician)
