= William Stanford Grignon =

Planter and slave owner in Jamaica

William Stanford Grignon was a planter and slave owner in Jamaica. He was elected to the House of Assembly of Jamaica in 1820.
