= Arthur Broughton =

English botanist

Arthur Broughton (c. 1758–1796) was an English botanist.

Broughton took the degree of doctor in medicine at Edinburgh in 1779, then published a volume of brief diagnoses of British plants anonymously, and subsequently settled in Jamaica, where he died in 1796, judging from certain notes in Wiles's edition of the Hortus Eastensis. His name is preserved in the genus of orchids named Broughtonia by Robert Brown.

== See also ==
- Hinton East

== Works ==
- Diss. Med. de Vermibus Intestinorum, Edinburgh, 1779, 8vo.
- Enchiridion Botanicum, London, 1782, 8vo.
- Hortus Eastensis; or a catalogue of Exotic Plants in the garden of Hinton East, Esq., in the mountains of Liguanea, at the time of his decease; Kingston, 1792, 4to; new edition by J. Wiles, Jamaica, 1806, 4to.
- Catalogue of the more valuable and rare Plants in the public botanic garden in the mountains of Liguanea, &c. (St. Jago de la Vega), 1794, 4to.
