= George Modd =

Jamaican politician

George Modd was the speaker of the House of Assembly of Jamaica for 1721–22.

== See also ==
- List of speakers of the House of Assembly of Jamaica
