= Nicholas Bourke =

Anglo-Irish planter in Jamaica (died 1771)

Nicholas Bourke (died 11 December 1771) was an Anglo-Irish planter in Jamaica who emigrated to the island around 1740 and acquired significant land-holdings there. He was prominent in the House of Assembly of Jamaica from the later 1750s and speaker in 1770.

Bourke argued in favour of the rights of Assemblymen of Jamaica during a dispute with the governor, William Lyttelton, 1st Baron Lyttelton, over who should finance the defence of the colony. Eventually, Bourke won his argument that the British government should bear the cost of defence, and Lyttelton was recalled.

Bourke is thought to have been the author of a pamphlet, The Privileges of the Island of Jamaica Vindicated, that was published in Kingston in 1765 and in London in 1766.

Bourke died in Jamaica on 11 December 1771.

== See also ==
- List of speakers of the House of Assembly of Jamaica
