= Walter Minto =

Planter and politician in Jamaica

Walter Minto (1779–1830) was a planter and slave-owner in Jamaica. He was elected to the House of Assembly of Jamaica in 1820.
