= Andrew Langley =

Qasso Corporation

Andrew Langley was the speaker of the House of Assembly of Jamaica in 1693, 1701 and 1702–03.

== See also ==
- List of speakers of the House of Assembly of Jamaica
