= William Rodon Rennalls =

Lawyer and politician in Jamaica

William Rodon Rennalls (19 October 1789 – 14 February 1863) was a lawyer in Jamaica and barrister of the Middle Temple in London. He was elected to the House of Assembly of Jamaica in 1820 for the Parish of Saint Catherine.
