= Samuel Long (Jamaican politician) =

Jamaican planter (1638–1683)

Samuel Long (1638–1683), planter and politician in the West Indies, was born in Wiltshire, England, the second son of Timothy Long (1610–1691) and his wife, Jane, the only daughter of Oliver Brunsell, the vicar of Wroughton. On 20 October 1661 he married Elizabeth Streete. They had six children.

At the age of sixteen he was attached as Lieutenant to the regiment of his kinsman Col. Edward D'Oyley when he set out on the original Cromwellian Expedition that seized Jamaica in 1655. After the Secretary of the Commissioners died, young Long succeeded him. This started him on a career that found him Speaker of the House of Assembly of Jamaica at the age of thirty-three, for 1671 and 1673. and Chief Justice of Jamaica at thirty-eight.

== See also ==
- List of speakers of the House of Assembly of Jamaica
