= John Peeke =

Jamaican politician (died 1716)

John Peeke (died 1716) was the speaker of the House of Assembly of Jamaica in 1688 and 1706. He owned 173 slaves according to the 1708 return.

== See also ==
- List of speakers of the House of Assembly of Jamaica
