= Receiver general =

A receiver general (or receiver-general) is an officer responsible for accepting payments on behalf of a government, and for making payments to a government on behalf of other parties.

== See also ==
- Treasurer
- Receiver General for Canada
- Receiver General of Cornwall
- Receiver-General of the Duchy of Lancaster
- Receiver General of the Isle of Man
- Receiver General of Jamaica
- Receiver General of Westminster Abbey
