= Broughtonia domogledi =

Conservation status
- Near Threatened (IUCN 3.1)

Scientific classification
- Kingdom: Animalia
- Phylum: Arthropoda
- Class: Insecta
- Order: Orthoptera
- Suborder: Ensifera
- Family: Tettigoniidae
- Genus: Broughtonia
- Species: B. domogledi

Binomial name
- Broughtonia domogledi (Brunner von Wattenwyl, 1882)

Synonyms
- Platycleis domogledi Brunner von Wattenwyl, 1882; Metrioptera domogledi (Brunner von Wattenwyl, 1882)

Species of cricket-like animal

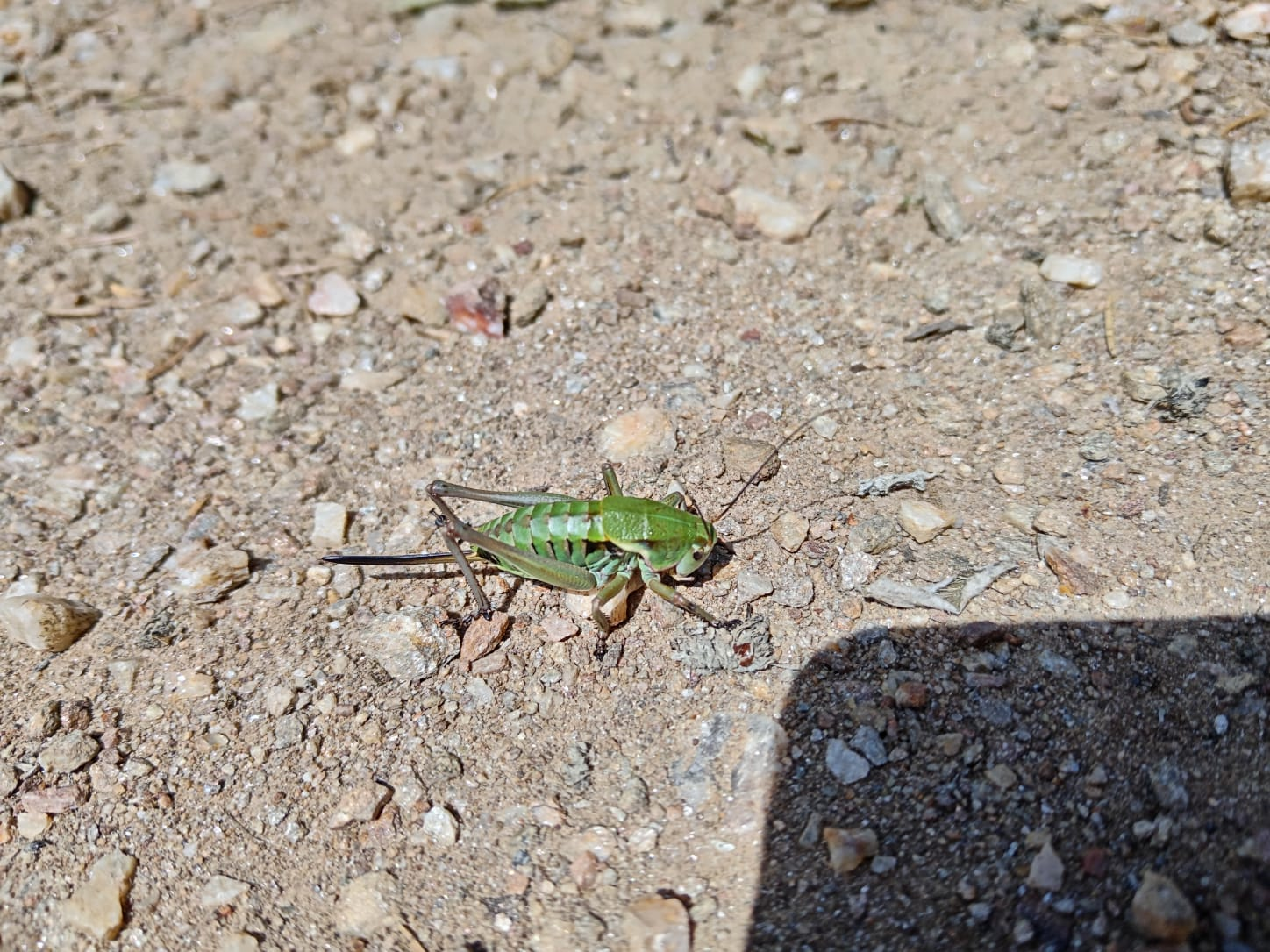
Photo of Broughtonia domogledi

Broughtonia domogledi is a species of insect in family Tettigoniidae. It is found in Serbia and Romania.
