= Vassall (surname) =

Vassall is a surname, and may refer to:

- Elizabeth Vassall, later Elizabeth Fox, Baroness Holland (1771–1845), English political hostess, wife of Henry Vassall-Fox, 3rd Baron Holland
- Florentius Vassall (1689–1778), planter and slave-owner in Jamaica.
- Harry Vassall (1860–1926), English schoolmaster, writer and rugby union player, writer and rugby union footballer
- Henry Vassall (1887–1949), English rugby union footballer
- Henry Vassall-Fox, 3rd Baron Holland (1773–1840), English politician
- Gilbert Vassall (1876–1941), English cricketer
- John Vassall (1924–1996), British civil servant who spied for the Soviet Union
- Lola N. Vassall (1906–2002), Jamaican-American physician
- Samuel Vassall (bapt.1586–1667), English merchant and politician
- Samuel Vassall (Jamaica), speaker of the House of Assembly of Jamaica in 1711
- William Vassall (bapt. 1592–1657?), signatory to the Massachusetts Bay Charter

== See also ==
- Vassalli, a surname
