= Alex Hepburn (cricketer) =

Australian cricketer

Hepburn v R
- Court: England and Wales Court of Appeal
- Decided: 4 June 2020
- Citation: (2020) EWCA Crim 820

Outcome
- Appeal dismissed

Court membership
- Judges sitting: Lord Burnett, Justice Sweeney, Justice Murray

Alex Hepburn
Personal information
- Full name: Alex Hepburn
- Born: 21 December 1995 (age 30); Subiaco, Western Australia
- Height: 5 ft 10 in (1.78 m)
- Batting: Right-handed
- Bowling: Right-arm medium

Domestic team information
- Years: Team
- 2015–2017: Worcestershire (squad no. 26)
- List A debut: 17 August 2015 Worcestershire v Leicestershire
- Twenty20 debut: 5 August 2017 Worcestershire v Northamptonshire

Career statistics
Competition	List A	T20
Matches	2	5
Runs scored	32	25
Batting average	32.00	12.50
100s/50s	0/0	0/0
Top score	32	10
Balls bowled	113	75
Wickets	6	6
Bowling average	13.00	18.00
5 wickets in innings	0	1
10 wickets in match	0	0
Best bowling	4/34	5/24
Catches/stumpings	0/–	2/–
- Source: CricketArchive, 12 April 2019

Alex Hepburn (born 21 December 1995) is a cricketer from Australia and convicted sex offender, who last played for Worcestershire County Cricket Club in England. In April 2019, he was sentenced to five years' imprisonment for the rape of a sleeping woman as part of a WhatsApp-based "sexual conquest game". He was imprisoned at HM Prison Littlehey until October 2021.

== Cricket career ==
A batting all-rounder, he bowled right-arm medium pace, and batted right-handed. He made his one-day debut for Worcestershire against Leicestershire in August 2015. He made his Twenty20 cricket debut for Worcestershire in the 2017 NatWest T20 Blast on 5 August 2017.

== Rape conviction ==
=== Conviction ===
On 9 November 2017, Hepburn was charged with one count of oral rape, and one count of vaginal rape. Those charges were not confirmed to the public until 29 November 2017. Worcestershire County Cricket Club suspended Hepburn on full pay, but did not renew his contract when it expired at the end of September 2018. At Hepburn's trial in January 2019, the jury failed to reach a verdict, and as a result were discharged.

He underwent a retrial in April 2019. During the trial Hepburn admitted he had sent "disgusting" WhatsApp messages about a sexual conquest competition. Worcestershire County Cricket Club issued a statement saying that they were appalled by the details reported in the case. On April 12 he was convicted of one count of oral rape, but was acquitted of the vaginal rape charge. On 30 April 2019, Hepburn was sentenced to five years in prison, and placed on the sex offenders register for life.

=== Appeal ===
In May 2020, Hepburn appealed his conviction on the ground that it was an unsafe verdict. He was represented by David Emanuel QC. His appeal was made on two grounds. Ground one was that the WhatsApp messages were irrelevant and prejudicial to the trial, and ought not to have been admitted. The court rejected his submission, finding that the messages were relevant as important explanatory evidence, and relevant to an "important matter in issue between the parties, namely, belief in consent", as his attitudes toward consent were found to be relevant as to his likelihood of having committed the offence. The court also found that the prosecutor Ms Moore QC's questions relating to Hepburn's promiscuity were correctly objected to, but did not undermine the conviction.

His second ground of appeal was that the jury's acquittal of him having committed vaginal rape, was inconsistent with their verdict that he had committed oral rape. The court stated:

Even if one starts from the premise that the complainant was awake at the outset, the jury could be sure she did not appreciate that it was the appellant with whom she was having sex at the beginning, and that he had no genuine and reasonable belief that she was consenting, but that things might have changed the longer the sexual contact went on without any outward demonstration of a lack of consent (accepted by the complainant) it is at least possible that by the time vaginal intercourse started the jury's conclusion about the appellant's belief and whether it was reasonable was different. —Lord Chief Justice Burnett

As both arguments in support of an unsafe verdict finding failed, Hepburn's appeal against conviction was dismissed.

== Release from prison ==
Hepburn was released from prison on 26 October 2021.

Following this, Oswestry Cricket Club was approached by a third party about the possibility of Hepburn training and/or playing for the club the following season. The club's committee overwhelmingly voted against the proposal.

In September 2024, Hepburn was banned from cricket-related activity in England and Wales for 10 years, backdated to when he was released from prison. This followed a disciplinary case heard by the Cricket Discipline Commission (CDC) into two breaches of England and Wales Cricket Board directives to which he did not respond. As well as imposing the ban, the CDC ruled he must undergo appropriate professional treatment for the issues leading to his criminal conviction and do appropriate training and education courses before resuming any cricket-related activity.
