= HM Prison Littlehey =

Prison in Cambridgeshire, England

Coordinates: 52.2806°N 0.3122°W

HMP Littlehey
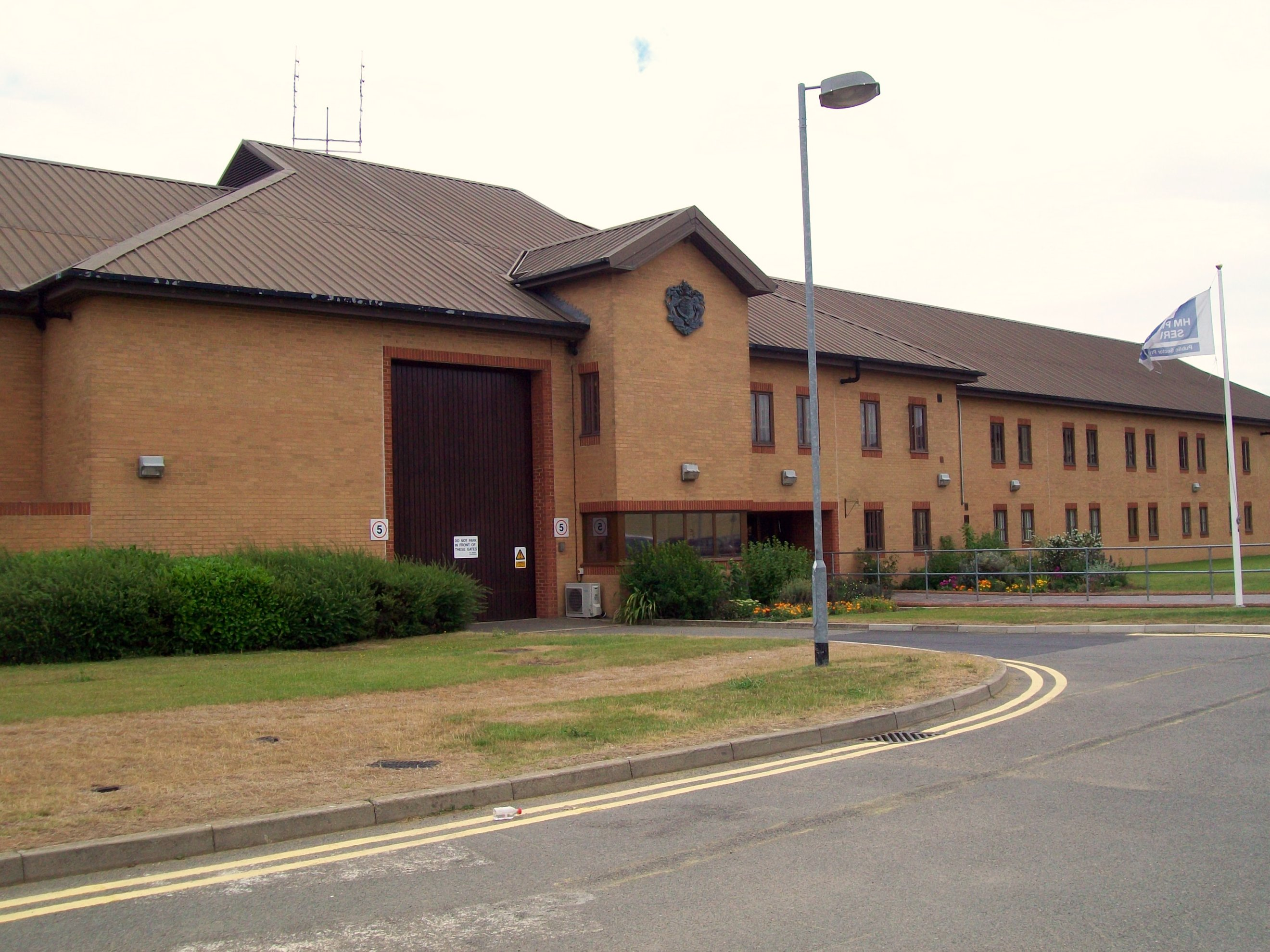
- Interactive map of HMP Littlehey
- Location: Perry, Cambridgeshire
- Security class: Adult Male/Category C
- Population: 1,220 (May 2020)
- Opened: 1988
- Managed by: HM Prison Services
- Governor: Naomi Daw
- Website: Littlehey at justice.gov.uk

HM Prison Littlehey is a Category C male prison in the village of Perry near Huntingdon in Cambridgeshire, England. Littlehey Prison is operated by His Majesty's Prison Service. The prison only holds those that have been convicted of a sexual offence.

== History ==
The site was originally known as Gaynes Hall Youth Custody Centre, and was used as a borstal for juvenile males from 1945 to 1983, when the establishment was closed and demolished. Littlehey was built in its place and opened as an integrated Category C prison for adult males in 1988.

In April 2003, an inspection report from Her Majesty's Chief Inspector of Prisons criticised Littlehey Prison for not helping inmates integrate back into society. The report found that "prisoners needed more help with finding jobs and accommodation before their release", but noted positively that the staff had good relationships with the prisoners and were doing better managing the health care of prisoners.

Accommodation at Littlehey comprises eight residential units, two of which are 'Ready to Use' units, one added in 1997 and the second in 2003. Most cells are single occupancy but there are some shared cells.

Littlehey Prison reports that it provides a range of work provision for inmates including accredited vocational training courses in forklift trucks, carpentry, joinery, motor mechanics, hospitality and educational. Classes range from basic and key skills to degree level learning.

In January 2010, HMP Littlehey opened a large expansion to its current site to accommodate a population of up to 480 young offenders. This investment has allowed for the addition of four new accommodation blocks, an all-weather sports pitch and a gymnasium, adult learning and kitchen buildings. The regime claims to focus on providing young offenders with a portfolio of skills and qualifications to change their futures. Employability and functional skills are said to be at the centre of the establishment's drive towards reducing re-offending. There is also a Prison Visitor Centre which is operated by the Invisible Walls community interest company.

In January 2011, a disturbance at the prison left two prison officers injured.

In 2014, the prison was re-categorised to accommodate prisoners convicted of sex offences (falling within category C security level).

A 2015 report from the Independent Monitoring Board observed that HMP Littlehey had an unusually high population of inmates over the age of 50 (34%). Concerns were raised over the lack of provision for elderly and disabled prisoners, and reports have emerged of inmates struggling with wheelchair access and not receiving support for health problems such as incontinence.

In January 2018 it was found that there were serious problems over maintenance work with 1,300 jobs outstanding. Some showers had been out of action for two years and some prisoners were without heating for eight months. Prison officers spent disproportionate time dealing with maintenance problems. Trust between prisoners and staff had broken down because staff could not meet prisoners' basic needs. Andrew Neilson of the Howard League for Penal Reform said, "The lamentable conditions in Littlehey are indicative of the pressures that exist in our overburdened and under-resourced prison system."

== Notable inmates ==
- Barry Bennell (died whilst a prisoner)
- Russell Brand
- Max Clifford (died whilst a prisoner)
- Stephen Downing
- Alex Hepburn
- Tony Jasinskyj
- Harry Roberts
