= Vassal (surname) =

Vassal is a surname, and may refer to:

- Gabrielle Maud Vassal (1880–1959), British naturalist
- Guy Vassal (1941–2022), French playwright
- Jean-Philippe Vassal (born 1954), French architect and academic
- Martine Vassal (born 1962), French politician who has presided over the Aix-Marseille-Provence...

== See also ==
- Vassall (surname)
