= Perry, Cambridgeshire =

Village in Cambridgeshire, England

Coordinates: 52.28°N 0.32°W

Perry
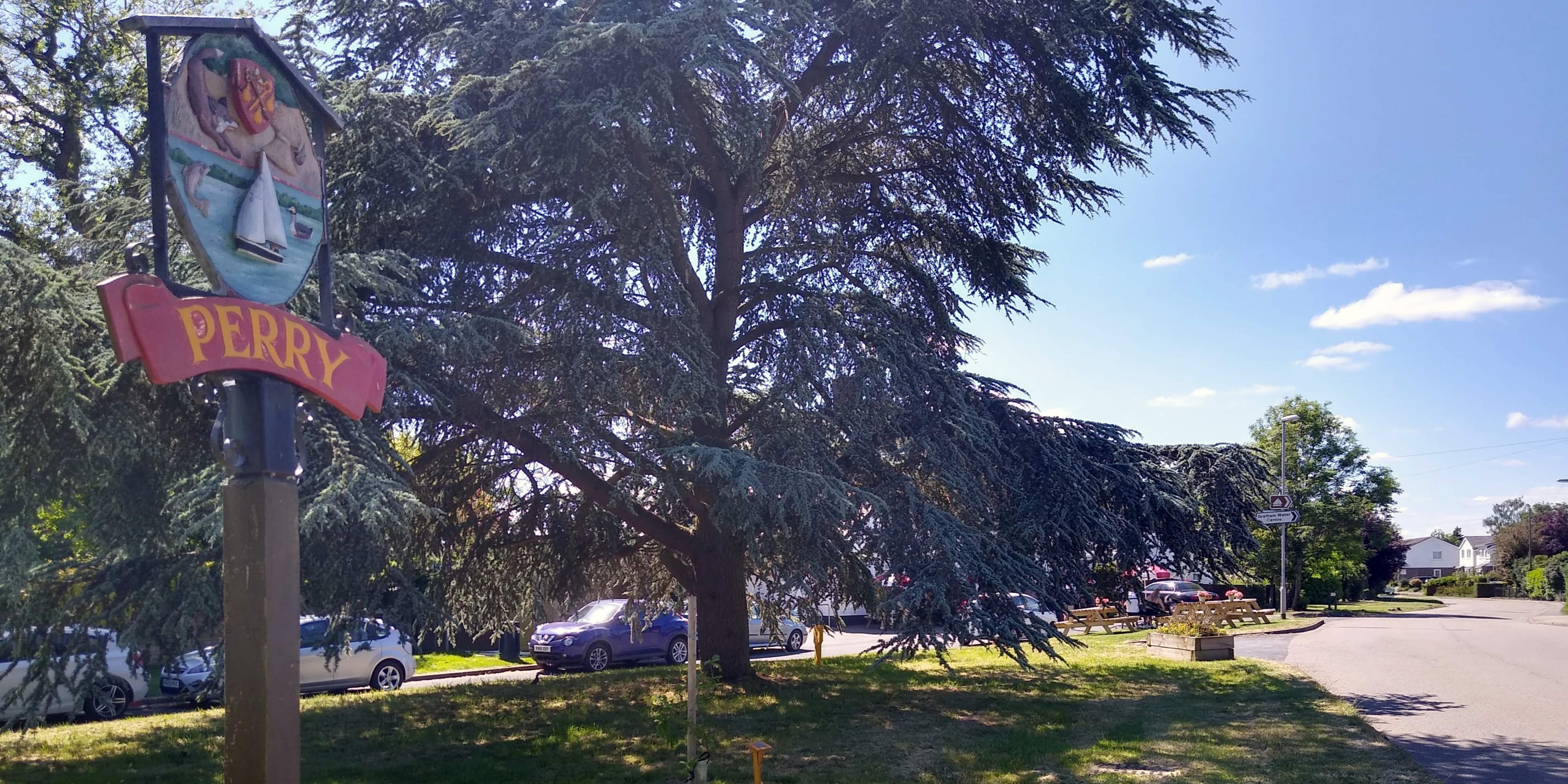
- Perry village sign

- Location within Cambridgeshire
- Population: 1,796 (2011)
- OS grid reference: TL148664
- District: Huntingdonshire
- Shire county: Cambridgeshire
- Region: East
- Country: England
- Sovereign state: United Kingdom
- Post town: Huntingdon
- Postcode district: PE28
- Police: Cambridgeshire
- Fire: Cambridgeshire
- Ambulance: East of England
- UK Parliament: Huntingdon

Perry is a village and civil parish in Cambridgeshire, England, approximately 6 miles (10 km) south-west of Huntingdon. Perry is in Huntingdonshire, a non-metropolitan district of Cambridgeshire and historic county of England. Perry is on the shore of a reservoir, Grafham Water, a few miles from the market town of St Neots.

Before becoming a parish in its own right the village was divided into West Perry (in the parish of Great Staughton) and East Perry (in the parish of Grafham).

== History ==
West Perry was listed in the Domesday Book of 1086 in the Hundred of Toseland in Huntingdonshire; the name of the settlement was written as Pirie in the Domesday Book. In 1086 there was just one manor at West Perry; the annual rent paid to the lord of the manor in 1066 had been £2 and the rent was the same in 1086. There were six households at West Perry. with an estimated population of 21 to 30 people.

== Government ==
As a civil parish, Perry has a parish council, which consists of five councillors and a parish clerk.

Perry was in the historic and administrative county of Huntingdonshire until 1965. From 1965, the village was part of the new administrative county of Huntingdon and Peterborough. Then in 1974, following the Local Government Act 1972, Perry became a part of the county of Cambridgeshire.

The second tier of local government is Huntingdonshire District Council which is a non-metropolitan district of Cambridgeshire. Perry is a part of the district ward of Brampton and is represented on the district council by two councillors. For Perry the highest tier of local government is Cambridgeshire County Council which has administration buildings in Cambridge. Perry is part of the electoral division of Brampton and Kimbolton and is represented on the county council by one councillor.

At Westminster Perry is in the parliamentary constituency of Huntingdon, and has been represented in the House of Commons by Ben Obese-Jecty (Conservative) since 2024.

== Demography ==
=== Population ===
The new parish of Perry was formed in the 1980s.

Parish	1981	1991	2001	2011
Perry		1,156	1,146	1,796

All population census figures from report Historic Census figures Cambridgeshire to 2011 by Cambridgeshire Insight.

In 2011, the parish covered an area of 1,455 acres (589 hectares) and the population density of Perry in 2011 was 790 persons per square mile (304.9 per square kilometre).

== Culture and community ==
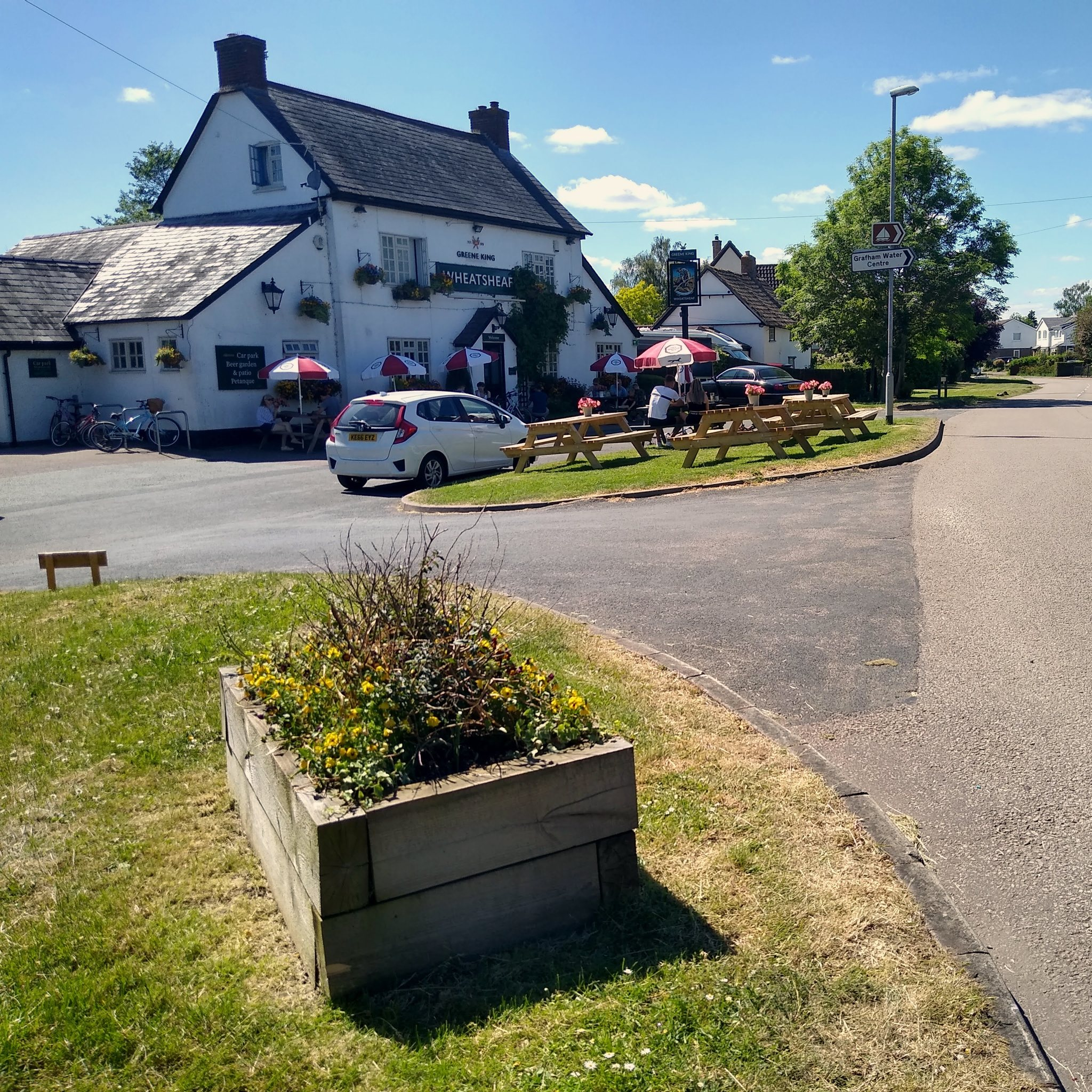
The Wheatsheaf pub

In the village there is a Baptist church, a village shop/Post Office, a public house called The Wheatsheaf, a watersport activity centre, a dog training centre, a climbing wall, a shop called Jonti which is a chandlery windsurfing retailer and tuition/hire centre, a restaurant (Harbour View Café Bar), and conference suite.

== Landmarks ==
Gaynes Hall is a Grade II* listed country house on the south side of the village.

The parish also includes HMP Littlehey, a category C prison built on the site of former borstal next to Gaynes Hall.
