= Matthew Gregory (speaker) =

Jamaican politician (1655–1715)

Matthew Gregory was the speaker of the House of Assembly of Jamaica in 1705 and 1706.

== See also ==
- List of speakers of the House of Assembly of Jamaica
