= Edward Manning (politician) =

Jamaican politician (died 1756)

Edward Manning (died 1756) was the speaker of the House of Assembly of Jamaica in 1755. He died on 6 December 1756.

== See also ==
- List of speakers of the House of Assembly of Jamaica
