= List of speakers of the House of Assembly of Jamaica =

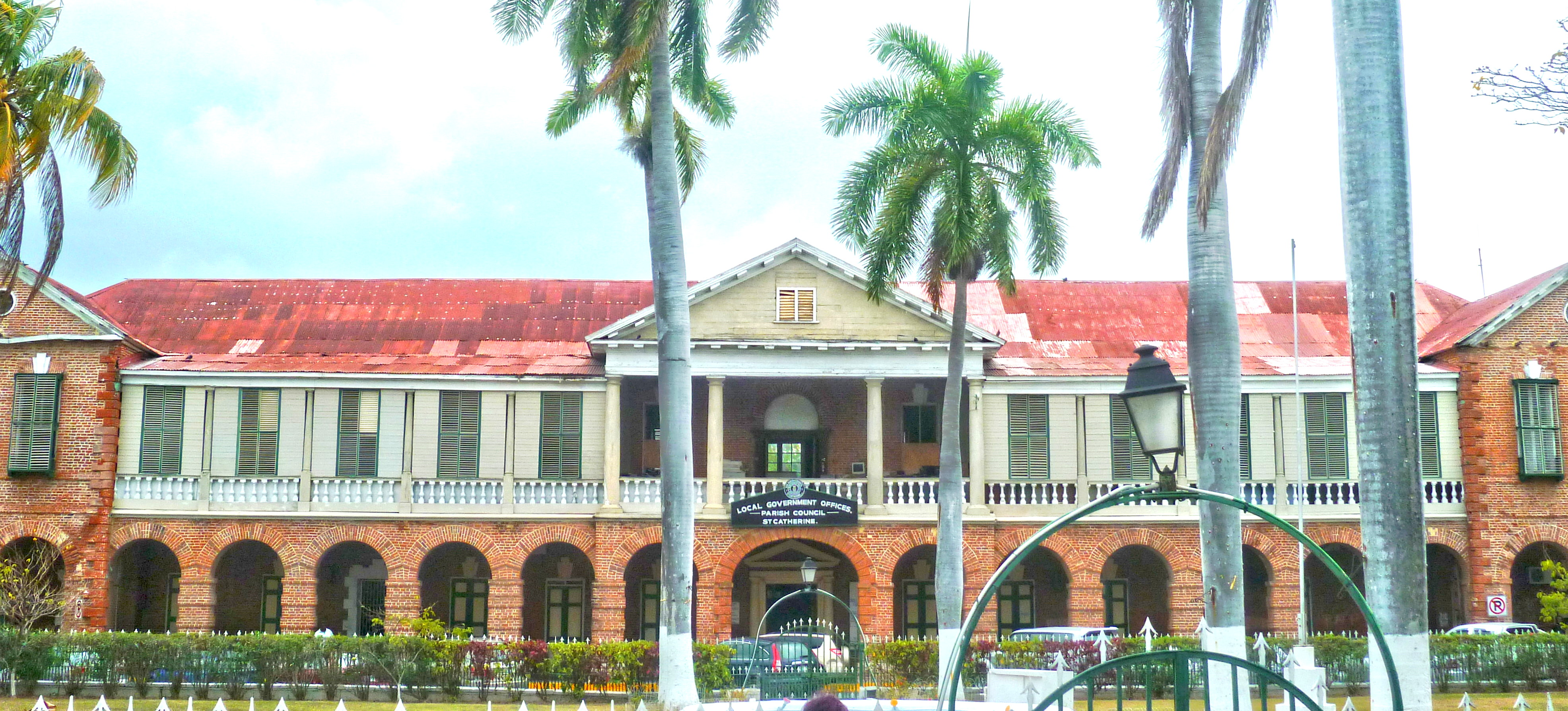
Former House of Assembly in Spanish Town

This is a list of speakers of the House of Assembly of Jamaica (1664-1865).

== 17th century ==
- 1664. Robert Freeman
- 1664. Sir Thomas Whetstone
- 1671. Samuel Long
- 1672-73. Major John Colebeck (pro tem.)
- 1673. Samuel Long
- 1677. Lieut.-Col. William Beeston
- 1679-88. Samuel Bernard
- 1688. George Nedham (pro tem.)
- 1688. Roger Hope Elletson
- 1688. Thomas Rives
- 1688. John Peeke
- 1691-92. Thomas Sutton
- 1693. Andrew Langley
- 1694. James Bradshaw
- 1698. Thomas Sutton

== 18th century ==
- 1701, Andrew Langley
- 1702. Francis Rose
- 1702-03. Andrew Langley
- 1704. Edward Stanton
- 1705. Matthew Gregory
- 1706. Hugh Totterdale
- 1706. John Peeke
- 1706. Matthew Gregory
- 1707-11. Peter Beckford (junior)
- 1711. William Brodrick
- 1711. Samuel Vassall (pro tem.)
- 1711-13. Peter Beckford Jnr.
- 1714. Hugh Totterdale
- 1715. John Blair
- 1716. Peter Beckford
- 1718. William Nedham
- 1719. Edmund Kelly
- 1721-22. George Modd
- 1722. William Nedham
- 1724. John Manley (pro tem.)
- 1725. Francis Melling
- 1727-28. Thomas Beckford
- 1731. John Stewart
- 1733. William Nedham
- 1745. Charles Price (afterwards Sir Charles, Bt.) (pro tem.)
- 1747. Richard Beckford (pro tem.)
- 1751. Richard Beckford (pro tem.)
- 1755. Edward Manning
- 1756. Thomas Hibbert
- 1756. Charles Price
- 1763. Charles Price, Jnr. (afterwards 2nd Baronet)
- 1764. Thomas Fearon (pro tem.)
- 1765. Charles Price, Jnr.
- 1766. William Nedham
- 1768. Edward Long
- 1768. Phillip Pinnock
- 1770. Nicholas Bourke
- 1770. Charles Price, Jnr.
- 1775. Phillip Pinnock
- 1776. Sir Charles Price (2nd Baronet)
- 1778. Jasper Hall
- 1778-93. Samuel Williams Haughton
- 1781. Thomas French (pro tem.)
- 1782. William Pusey (pro tem.)
- 1787. William Blake (pro tem.)
- 1793. William Blake
- 1797. Donald Campbell
- 1798. Keane Osborne

== 19th century ==
- 1802. Philip Redwood
- 1809. James Lewis
- 1821. David Finlayson
- 1830. Richard Barrett
- 1832. Robert Allwood
- 1838. Richard Barrett
- 1839. Edward Panton
- 1842. Samuel Jackson Dallas
- 1849. Charles McLarty Morales
- 1861. Edward Jordon (pro tem.)
- 1864. Charles Hamilton Jackson
