= Samuel Vassall (Jamaican politician) =

Former speaker of the House of Assembly of Jamaica

Samuel Vassall was the speaker of the House of Assembly of Jamaica in 1711.

== See also ==
- List of speakers of the House of Assembly of Jamaica
