= Edward Stanton (politician) =

Jamaican Military officer and politician

Colonel Edward Stanton (died 1705) was the speaker of the House of Assembly of Jamaica in 1704.

== Career ==
He was an assistant judge at Saint David in 1671 and served as a member of the assembly for Saint David in 1671 and for Saint Thomas for multiple assemblies from 1674 to 1701. He represented Kingston in 1702 and 1704. He was speaker in 1704.

He married Prescilla Houghton, the widow of Cary Helyar, in 1675.

== Death ==
Stanton died in 1705.

== See also ==
- List of speakers of the House of Assembly of Jamaica
