= Gaynes Hall =

Country house in Perry, Cambridgeshire, England

Coordinates: 52.282145°N 0.320583°W

The entrance facade post restoration

Gaynes Hall is a Grade II* listed Georgian mansion set in 20 acres (81,000 m^{2}) of parkland in the heart of the Cambridgeshire countryside. Located in the village of Perry, Huntingdon the building was requisitioned during the Second World War and was also the residence of Sir Oliver Cromwell for 21 years.

== History ==
Gaynes Hall takes its name from the family of Engaine; the original house was probably built as the hall of their manor of Dillington. In 1238 Viel de Engaine was living there when he had licence to have his private chapel at his manor of Dillington. Only small fragments of the moat remain from the original Engayne dwelling.

Sir Oliver Cromwell (1566-1655), uncle and namesake of the Protector, leased the estate for 21 years and sublet it to his brother Richard Cromwell from 1599. In 1664, it was purchased by a wealthy London lawyer, Sir James Beverley and remained in the family until sold in 1717 to General Thomas Handasyd, a former Governor of Jamaica; his son George passed it onto to Elizabeth Galley in 1771.

In 1940, it was requisitioned and used by the Special Operations Executive or SOE, created to support non-military operations, such as propaganda, sabotage and intelligence operations. Under the code name of ‘Station 61’, Gaynes Hall was the headquarters for the Air Liaison Officers and used as a ‘hotel’ for agents prior to being air dropped into occupied Europe.

Post 1945, it was used as the administrative office and governor's house for Gaynes Hall Borstal. The borstal stood on the site of Littlehey Prison. The boys maintained the grounds and gardens of Gaynes Hall until the borstal closed in 1983. The site was surrounded with what were referred to as "Moats" which to this day are teeming with Carp.

In 1985, Gaynes Hall was purchased by AIM Cambridge (later AIM Technology) a technology consulting company. The building was renovated and adapted to the needs of the company. During the renovation, some of the original fittings were stolen and not recovered. Within two years, AIM Technology closed and the building became empty.

Gaynes Hall was sold by the Ministry of Defence to a private company in 1990 and the restoration of the house has been ongoing since 1994.

In May 2021, Gaynes Hall was valued at £3.45m.

== Previous owners ==
- 1116–1322 Engaine Family
- 1322–1421 Barnack Family
- 1421–1607 Stonham Family (let to the Cromwell family, 1599–1620)
- 1601-1663 Lake family
- 1664-1716 Beverley family
- 1717–1771 Handasyde Family
- 1772-1797 Galley family
- 1798–1940 Duberley Family
- 1994-2002 McCallion Family
- 2002-CURRENT Lord Anant Malik

== Access ==
House and gardens are now privately owned.
