= Hinton East =

Hinton East (died 1792) was a Jamaican creole of English parents who was a member of House of Assembly of Jamaica for Kingston. He was also Judge Advocate General and Receiver General of Jamaica.

A slave-owner, he created a private botanic garden at Spring Garden, Gordon Town, Liguanea.
