= Robert Hotchkyn =

Robert Hotchkyn was the Attorney General of Jamaica in 1703. His brother was the reverend John Hotchkin, rector of Abbotts Ripton, Huntingdonshire, owner of the Upper and Lower Ground estates in Jamaica and absentee slave-owner.
