= Thomas Handasyd =

British army officer and colonial administrator

Major-General Thomas Handasyd

Governor of Jamaica
- In office 1702–1711

Commander, St. John's, Newfoundland
- In office 1697–1698

Personal details
- Born: ca 1645 Elsdon, Northumberland
- Died: 26 March 1729 (aged 83) Gaynes Hall, near Great Staughton, Cambridgeshire
- Resting place: St Andrews' Church, Great Staughton
- Relations: Roger Handasyd (son)

Military service
- Years of service: 1674–1711
- Rank: Major-General
- Battles/wars: Franco-Dutch War; Siege of Maastricht (1676); Battle of Cassel (1677); Battle of Saint-Denis (1678); Williamite War in Ireland; Battle of the Boyne; Nine Years War; War of the Spanish Succession

Major-General Thomas Handasyd was a British Army officer and colonial administrator from Elsdon, Northumberland, who served as the governor of Jamaica from 1702 until 1711.

Handasyd first saw action during the Franco-Dutch War, before accompanying William to England in the 1688 Glorious Revolution. He also fought in the Williamite War in Ireland and Nine Years War; when the latter war ended with the 1697 Treaty of Ryswick, Handasyd had been promoted to the rank of lieutenant colonel. After the War of the Spanish Succession began in 1702, his regiment was sent to the English colony of Jamaica; when William Selwyn died soon after his arrival, Handasyd replaced him as regimental colonel and governor, a position he retained until 1710.

After returning to England in 1711, he purchased Gaynes Hall near Great Staughton, Cambridgeshire where he lived quietly in retirement until his death on 26 March 1729.

== Life ==
Thomas Handasyd was born about 1645 in Elsdon, Northumberland, to Colonel Roger Handasyd and his wife Margaret. He was the third of four children, three of whom lived to a great age; Gerrard (ca 1640–1735), Ann (ca 1644-?) and Roger (1653-1734).

In 1686, he married Anna Morel (died 1704) and they had five surviving children; Roger Handasyd (1689-1763), Thomas (1692-1729), William (1693-1745), who all served in the military, as well as Clifford (1695-1772) and Anne (1697-1777).

== Career ==
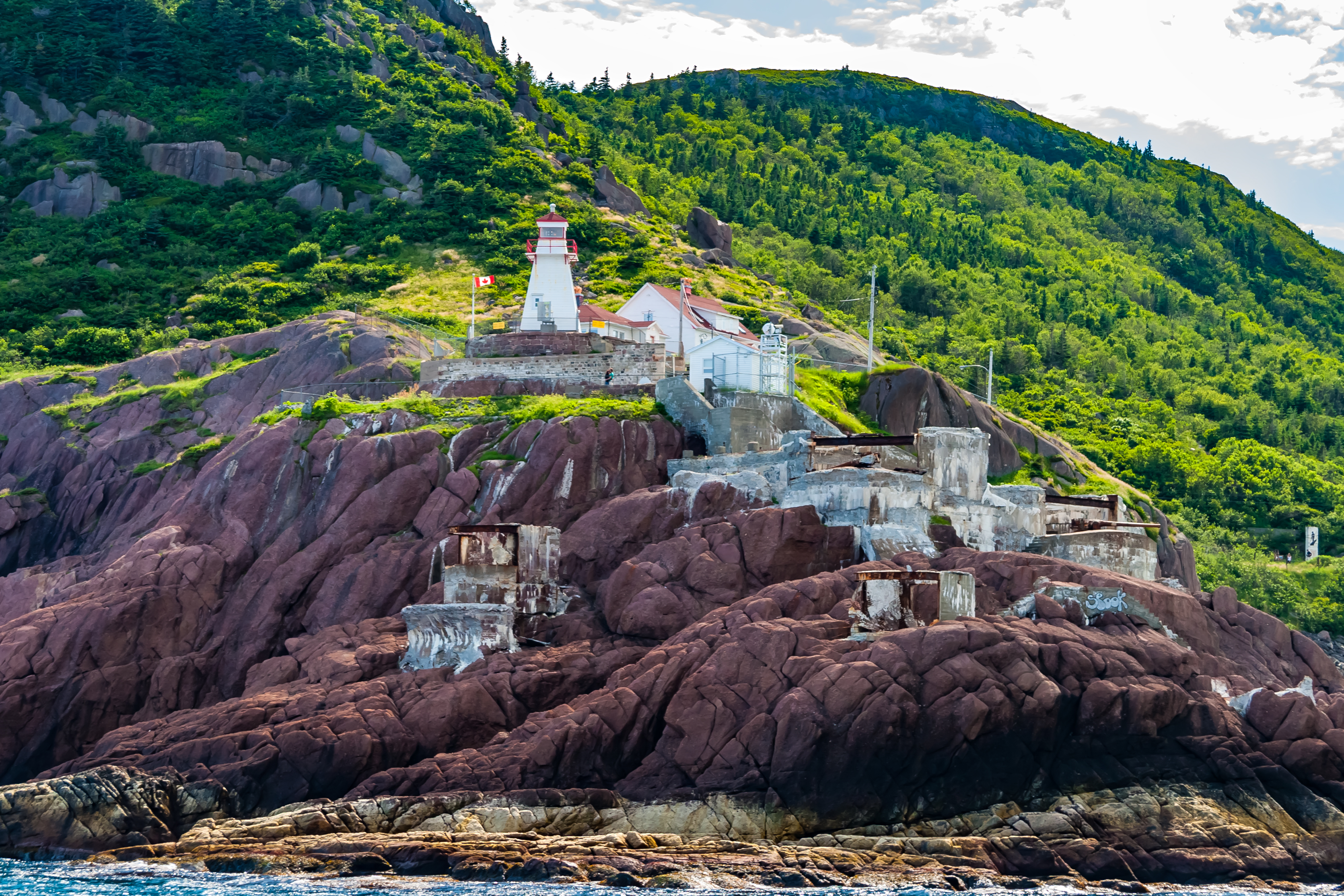
St. John's, Newfoundland; while serving here in 1697–1698, Handasyd lost 214 of 300 men to disease and starvation

The 1638-1651 Wars of the Three Kingdoms created strong resistance in Scotland and England to a permanent military; this meant those who wanted to pursue a military career often did so in foreign armies. When the Third Anglo-Dutch War began in 1672, the Duke of Buckingham was authorised to recruit a regiment for service against the Dutch. Handasyd's cousin James was also a lieutenant in this unit.

Before seeing active service, the war ended in January 1674 and many of these recruits transferred to one of the English regiments of the Scots Brigade, a mercenary unit employed by the Dutch. Handasyd joined what later became the 5th Foot and fought in the Franco-Dutch War, including the Siege of Maastricht and battles of Cassel and Saint-Denis.

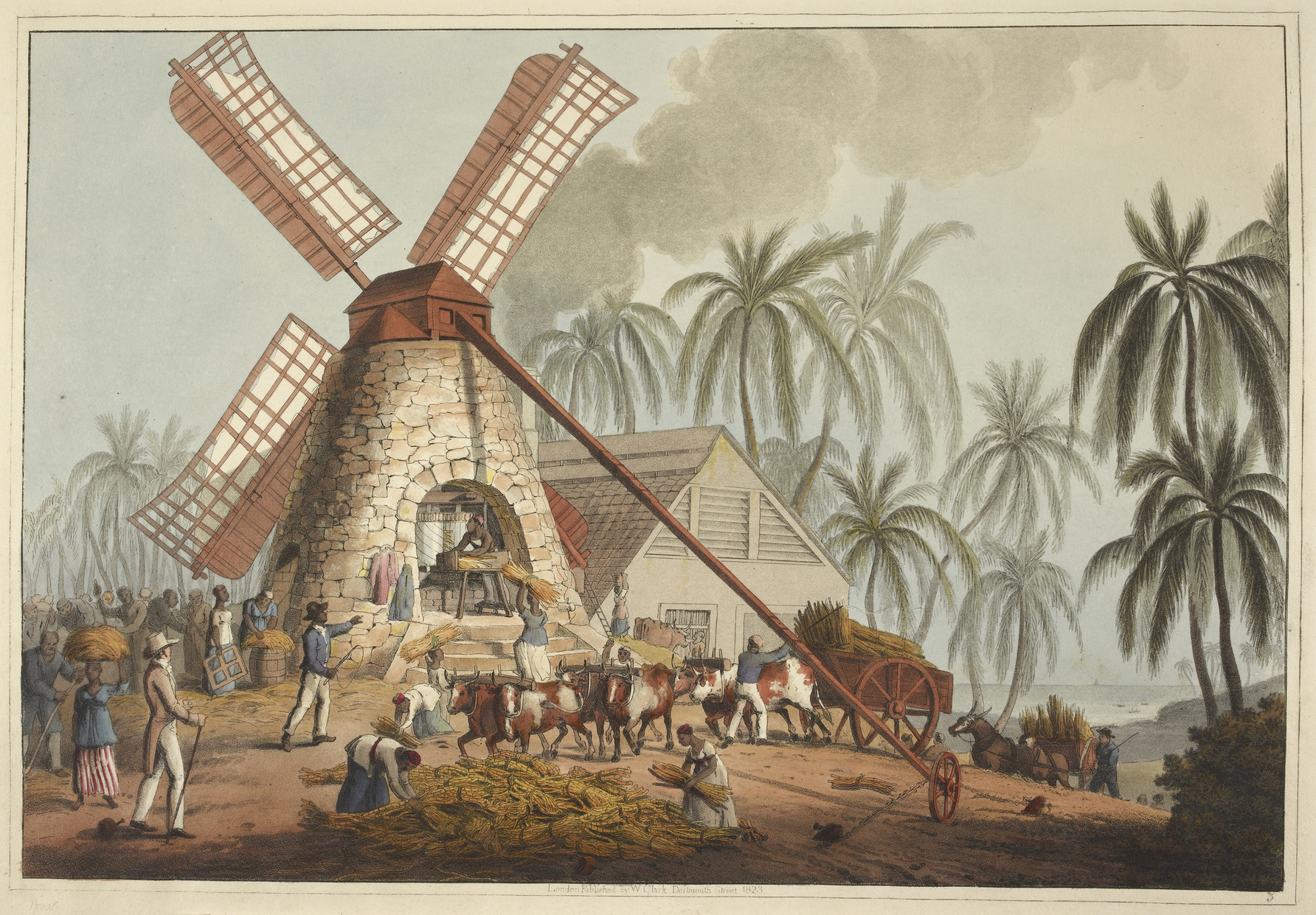
Sugar plantation in the West Indies; as Governor of Jamaica, Handasyd controlled an important commercial and strategic possession

The Brigade accompanied William III to England in the November 1688 Glorious Revolution; Handaysd served in the 1689-1691 Williamite War in Ireland, including the Battle of the Boyne. After the 1691 Treaty of Limerick, he was among those transferred to Flanders during the Nine Years War, by which time he was captain of the Grenadier company, a unit composed of elite assault troops. In March 1694, he was appointed Major in the 28th Foot, a new regiment raised by Colonel John Gibson, a former colleague in the Scots Brigade.

This was part of a force sent to retake St. John's, Newfoundland; captured by the French in June 1696, it was strategically important due to its proximity to the cod fishing areas of the Grand Banks. Gibson arrived in early 1697 to find the French had evacuated the town after first destroying it; short of supplies, he took most of his force back to Europe, leaving 300 men under Handasyd and the engineer Michael Richards to rebuild the town. By the time they returned to England in 1698, 214 of the 300 had died of malnutrition or disease, testimony to the harsh conditions.

After the war ended with the 1797 Treaty of Ryswick, Parliament was determined to reduce costs; Gibson's Regiment was disbanded and by 1699, the English military was less than 7,000 men. When the War of the Spanish Succession began in 1701, Handasyd was promoted lieutenant-colonel in the 22nd Foot. Sent to Jamaica, a notoriously unhealthy location, in April 1702 he replaced Colonel William Selwyn who died soon after arrival.

As the senior military officer, Handasyd also became governor, an important position due to Jamaica's hugely profitable sugar plantations. The island was a key resupply point for the Royal Navy; in March 1703, an English squadron under John Graydon was sent to attack the French town of Placentia, in Newfoundland. His ships arrived in Jamaica short of men and in poor condition; Handasyd made strenuous efforts to resupply him but the local merchants later complained about the impressment of local seamen.

Gaynes Hall, post restoration; purchased by Thomas in 1717

His wife Anna died in September 1704 and was buried in St. Jago de la Vega or Spanish Town Cathedral. Like his predecessor, Sir William Beeston, Thomas had a difficult relationship with the planter-dominated Jamaican Assembly. This came to a head in 1710, when he tried to dissolve the Assembly and in the ensuing commotion, its President Peter Beckford died after allegedly falling down the stairs.

Handasyd now requested he be relieved and was replaced as Governor by Lord Archibald Hamilton, while his son Roger became Colonel of the regiment. Promoted Major-General, he returned to England in early 1711 and purchased Gaynes Hall near Great Staughton, Cambridgeshire. He died there on 26 March 1729 and was buried in the parish church of St Andrews, where his memorial can still be seen.

== Sources ==
- Austin, PB; Zahedieh, Nuala (2004). "Beeston, Sir William (1636-1702)". Oxford Dictionary of National Biography (online ed.). Oxford University Press. doi:10.1093/ref:odnb/1955. (Subscription, Wikipedia Library access or UK public library membership required.)
- Black, Carlysle (1988) [1975]. History of Jamaica. Hodder. ISBN 978-0582038981.
- Boxer, CR (1969). "Some Second Thoughts on the Third Anglo-Dutch War, 1672–1674". Transactions of the Royal Historical Society. 19: 67–94. doi:10.2307/3678740. JSTOR 3678740.
- Cannon, Richard (1849). Historical Record of the Twenty-Second, or the Cheshire Regiment of Foot (2015 ed.). Andesite Press. ISBN 1296561828.
- Chandler, David; Beckett, Ian (1996). The Oxford History Of The British Army. Oxford University Press. ISBN 978-0192803115.
- Dalton, Charles (1904). English army lists and commission registers, 1661-1714, Volume II. Eyre & Spottiswoode.
- Dalton, Charles (1896). English army lists and commission registers, 1661-1714, Volume III. Eyre & Spottiswoode.
- Ede-Borrett, Stephen (2011). "Casualties in the Anglo-Dutch Brigade at St Denis, 1678". Journal of the Society for Army Historical Research. 81 (237). JSTOR 44230964.
- Godfrey, Michael (1969). Handasyd, Thomas in The Dictionary of Canadian Biography Volume (Online ed.). Univ of Toronto Pr / Les Presses de L'Universite Laval.
- Gregg, Edward (1980). Queen Anne (Revised) (The English Monarchs Series). Yale University Press. ISBN 0300090242.
- Handyside, Rob. "Robert Handyside and the Holystone Handasyd Chalice" (PDF). Coquetdale.
- Laughton, J. K.; Davies, J. D. (2004). "Graydon, John (died 1726)". Oxford Dictionary of National Biography (online ed.). Oxford University Press. doi:10.1093/ref:odnb/11359. (Subscription, Wikipedia Library access or UK public library membership required.)
- Marley, David F (2008). Wars of the Americas: A Chronology of Armed Conflict in the Western Hemisphere; Volume I. ABC-CLIO.
- Peel, Robin. "Great Staughton church; St Andrews". Churchcrawling.com.
- Poinsett, William; Robertson, James. "The Spanish Town Cathedral". www.markdgljmci.com.

Government offices
Preceded by Peter Beckford (acting)	Governor of Jamaica; 1702–1711	Succeeded by Lord Archibald Hamilton
Military offices
Preceded by William Selwyn	Colonel, 22nd Foot; 1702–1712	Succeeded by Roger Handasyde
