= William Nedham (Jamaican politician) =

Jamaican politician

William Nedham was the speaker of the House of Assembly of Jamaica in 1718, 1722, and 1733.

== See also ==
- List of speakers of the House of Assembly of Jamaica
