= Broughtonia (bush cricket) =

Scientific classification
- Domain: Eukaryota
- Kingdom: Animalia
- Phylum: Arthropoda
- Class: Insecta
- Order: Orthoptera
- Suborder: Ensifera
- Family: Tettigoniidae
- Subfamily: Tettigoniinae
- Tribe: Platycleidini
- Genus: Broughtonia; Harz, 1969

Genus of insects

External image
- Images at iNaturalist

Broughtonia is a genus of Palaearctic bush crickets in the tribe Platycleidini. It was first erected as the subgenus Metrioptera (Broughtonia) by K. Harz in 1969 and subsequently elevated to genus level in 2011. Species have been recorded from eastern Europe, with most records from the Balkans through to Romania and Bulgaria.

== Species ==
The Orthoptera Species File lists the following accepted species:

1. Broughtonia arnoldi (Ramme, 1933)
2. Broughtonia domogledi (Brunner von Wattenwyl, 1882) - type species (as Platycleis domogledi Brunner von Wattenwyl)
