= Receiver General of Jamaica =

The Receiver General of Jamaica was the public official in Jamaica responsible for receiving and disbursing money of the Government of Jamaica.

The receiver was able to appoint a number of deputies to work on his behalf.

== List of Receivers General of Jamaica ==
Note: This list is incomplete. Dates are dates of life, not dates in office unless otherwise stated.

- James Knight (fl. 1725–1745)
- Thomas Graham
- Robert Graham (c.1735-1797), appointed 1752.
- James Mitchell (1796)
- William Mitchell (1742–1823)
- Hinton East
- Jasper Hall (died 1798)
- Charles Sackville-Germain, 5th Duke of Dorset (1767–1843), in office 1776–1815
