= Vassalli =

Vassalli is a surname of Italian origin. People with that name include:

- Fortanerius Vassalli (died 1361), Italian Franciscan
- Giuliano Vassalli (1915–2009), Italian politician, lecturer and lawyer
- Luigi Vassalli (1812–1887), Italian Egyptologist and patriot
- Mikiel Anton Vassalli (1764–1829), Maltese writer
- Sebastiano Vassalli (1941–2015), Italian writer

== See also ==
- Liceo Vassalli Junior Lyceum, a school in Malta
