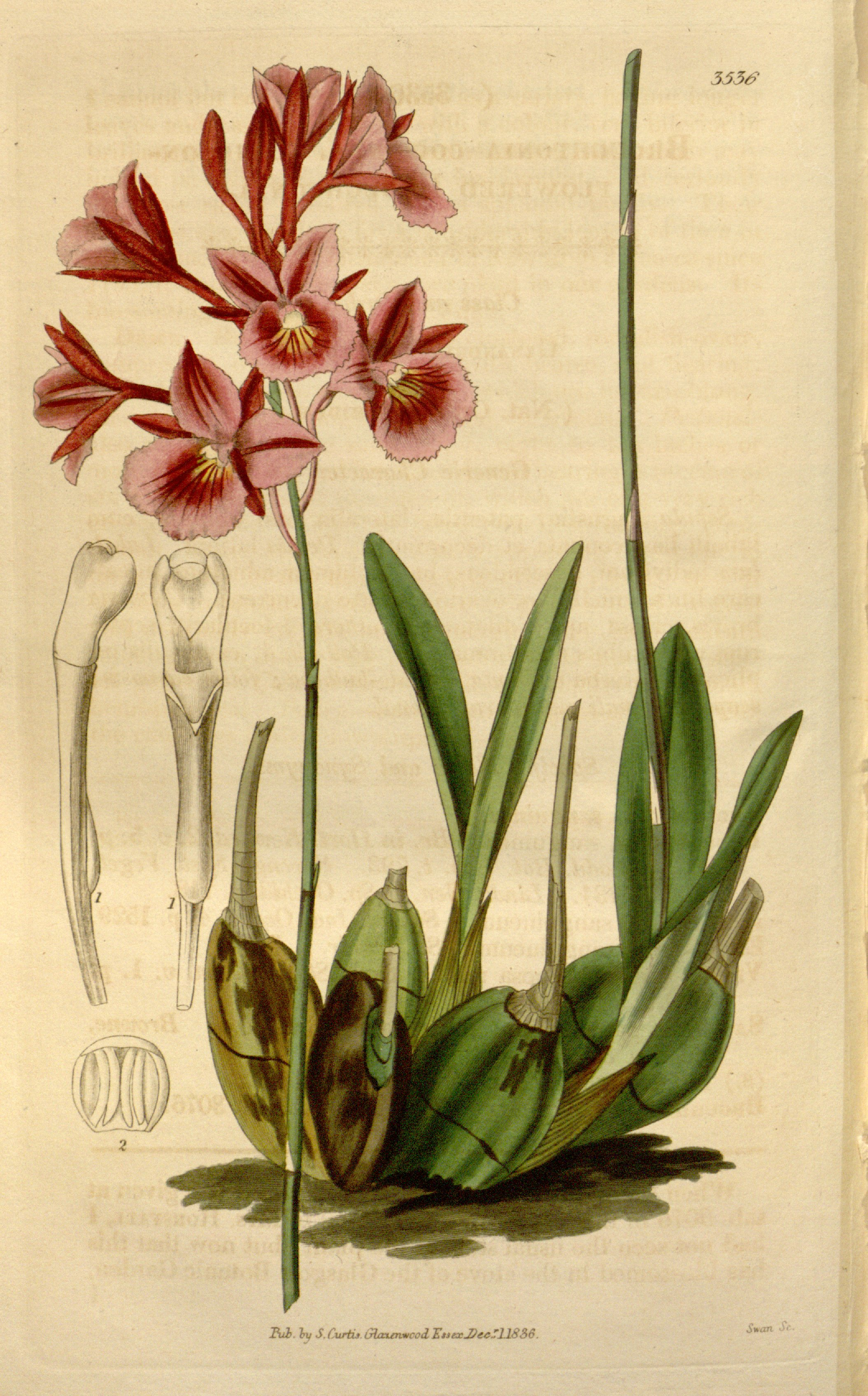
- Broughtonia sanguinea 1836 illustration

Scientific classification
- Kingdom: Plantae
- Clade: Tracheophytes
- Clade: Angiosperms
- Clade: Monocots
- Order: Asparagales
- Family: Orchidaceae
- Subfamily: Epidendroideae
- Tribe: Epidendreae
- Subtribe: Laeliinae
- Genus: Broughtonia; R.Br.

Type species
- Broughtonia sanguinea (Sw.) R.Br. in W.T.Aiton

Synonyms
- Laeliopsis Lindl.; Cattleyopsis Lem.

= Broughtonia (plant) =

Genus of orchids

Broughtonia is a genus of orchids (family Orchidaceae) native to the Bahamas and the Greater Antilles. The genus is abbreviated Bro in trade journals.

== Species ==
As presently constituted (February 2024), Broughtonia consists of 6 accepted natural species plus one recognized nothospecies.

Image	Name	Distribution	Elevation (m)
	Broughtonia cubensis (Lindl.) Cogn. in I.Urban	Cuba	
	Broughtonia domingensis (Lindl.) Rolfe	Hispaniola, Mona Island	0 - 200 meters
	Broughtonia lindenii (Lindl.) Dressler	Cuba, Bahamas	0 - 200 meters
	Broughtonia negrilensis Fowlie	Jamaica	89 meters
	Broughtonia ortgiesiana (Rchb.f.) Dressler	Cuba	
	Broughtonia sanguinea (Sw.) R.Br. in W.T.Aiton	Jamaica	0 - 800 meters

=== Natural Hybrids ===
Image	Name	Parentage	Distribution	Elevation (m)
	Broughtonia × guanahacabibensis Múj.Benítez, E.González & J.M.Díaz	(B. cubensis × B. ortgiesiana)	Cuba	
	Broughtonia × jamaicensis Sauleda & R.M.Adams	(B. negrilensis × B. sanguinea)	Jamaica	

The haploid chromosome number of one species, B. sanguinea, has been determined as n = 20.
