= House of Assembly of Jamaica =

Legislature of the British colony of Jamaica

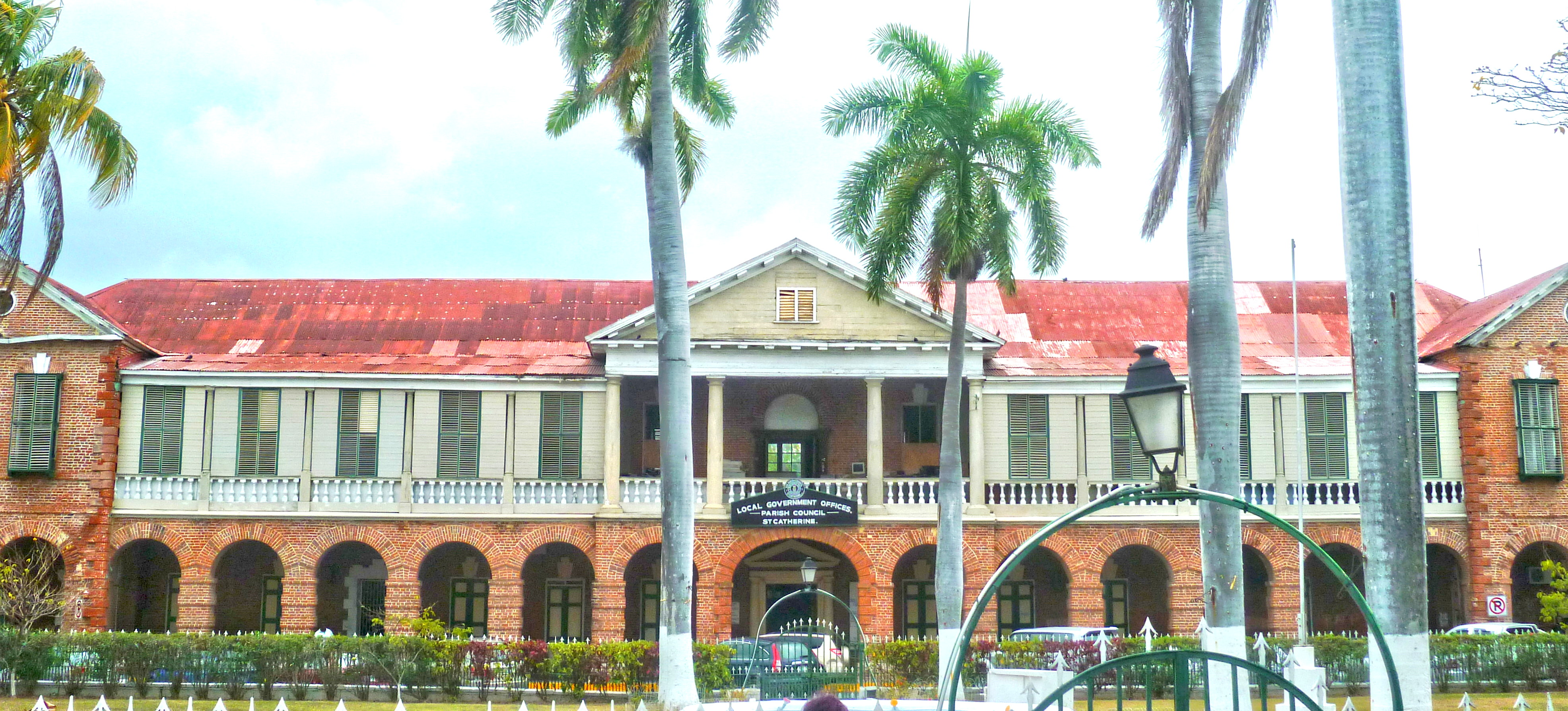
Former House of Assembly in Spanish Town

The House of Assembly was the legislature of the British colony of Jamaica from 1664–1865.

== History ==
The House of Assembly held its first meeting on 20 January 1664 at Spanish Town.

Originally, there were twelve districts represented. For many years, a high property qualification ensured that the House of Assembly was dominated by the White Jamaican planter class. However, to elect these representatives, the bar was lower for "freeholders", who just had to be white men with a house, pen, or plantation, and owned black slaves. A law passed in 1840 allowed some blacks and mixed-race men to vote in elections to the Assembly, though they had to own property, so the white planters continued to dominate it.

As a result of the Morant Bay rebellion, the Assembly voted to abolish self-governance in 1865. Jamaica then became a direct-ruled crown colony.

== See also ==
- Jamaican general elections, 1677–1863
- List of speakers of the House of Assembly of Jamaica
- Parliament of Jamaica
