= Beckford family =

English family

Coat of arms of the Backford family

The Beckford family was an English family which emigrated to Jamaica in the 17th century. There, they became members of the colony's planter class, acquiring great wealth through ownership of sugar plantations and slaves.

== Family members ==
- Peter Beckford of Maidenhead
  - Peter Beckford (1643 – 3 April 1710) also had brothers Sir Thomas Beckford (1618–1685) and Richard Beckford
    - His son Peter Beckford junior
      - His son Richard Beckford (c. 1711 – 1756)
        - His son William Beckford of Somerley (1744–1799) (married Charlotte Beckford, who died in 1833)
      - His son William Beckford (1709–1770) (married Maria Marsh, daughter of the Hon. George Hamilton)
        - His only child by this marriage was William Thomas Beckford (1760–1844) but also had eight children born out of wedlock including Richard Beckford (died 1796)
      - His son Julines Beckford (c. 1717 – c. 1764)
        - His son Peter Beckford (married Louisa Pitt)
          - Their son Horace Beckford (later Horace Pitt-Rivers) married Frances Rigby on 9 February 1808, daughter of Francis Hale Rigby, and had four children
            - George Pitt-Rivers, 4th Baron Rivers (1810–1866)
            - Horace Pitt-Rivers, 6th Baron Rivers (1814–1880)
            - Fanny Pitt (d. 1 February 1836), married Frederick William Cox on 24 July 1834
            - Harriet Elizabeth Pitt (1816 – 18 July 1876), maid of honour to Queen Victoria, married on 18 September 1841 Charles Dashwood Bruce (1802–1878), without issue
      - Peter Beckford juniors other son William Beckford
        - His son William Thomas Beckford
          - His daughter Susan Hamilton married Alexander Hamilton
- James Beckford Wildman, son of James Wildman of Chilham and Joanna Harper of Jamaica, was a godchild of William Beckford.

== Places of interest ==
- Beckford's Tower
- Fonthill Abbey

== Related families ==
- Pitt family
