= Roaring River =

Roaring River may refer to:

Rivers in Canada:

- Roaring River (Manitoba)

Rivers in Jamaica:

- Roaring River (Jamaica)

Rivers in the United States:

- Roaring River (Missouri)
- Roaring River (North Carolina)
- Roaring River (Colorado), in Rocky Mountain National Park
- Roaring River (Tennessee)
- Roaring River (California), a tributary of the South Fork Kings River
- Roaring River (Clackamas River) in Oregon
- Roaring River (Crabtree Creek) in Oregon
- Roaring River (South Fork McKenzie River) in Oregon

Unincorporated communities in the United States:

- Roaring River, North Carolina

Other:

- Roaring River Park, Jamaica, a nature park formerly the Roaring River Estate, in Petersfield, Jamaica
- Roaring River State Park, Missouri, United States
