= Beckford (surname) =

Beckford is an English surname derived from Beckford, Worcestershire, or from a similar toponym. Notable people of this name include the following:

- Allison Beckford (born 1979), Jamaican sprinter
- Chris Beckford-Tseu (born 1984), Canadian professional ice hockey player
- Darren Beckford (1967–2026), English professional football player
- Ethan Beckford (born 1999), Canadian soccer player
- James Beckford (athlete) (born 1975), Jamaican long jump athlete in the 1996 Olympics
- James A. Beckford (1942–2022), British sociologist
- Jason Beckford (born 1970), English professional football player
- Jermaine Beckford (born 1983), English professional football player
- Peter Beckford (colonial administrator), Jamaican planter and slave owner
- Peter Beckford (junior), Jamaican planter, slave owner and politician
- Peter Beckford, English fox hunter, author and Member of Parliament
- Reginald Beckford (fl. 20th century), Panamanian sprinter and businessman
- Richard Beckford (died 1796), English politician
- Robert Beckford (contemporary), British academic, theologian, and filmmaker
- Roxanne Beckford (born 1969), Jamaican actress
- Tyson Beckford (born 1970), American supermodel and actor
- William Beckford (1709–1770), English politician and slave owner; Lord Mayor of London
- William Beckford of Somerley, Jamaican slave owner and writer
- William Thomas Beckford (1760–1844), English novelist, art critic, travel writer, slave owner and politician

== See also ==
- Beckford family
