= Beckford =

Beckford refers to:

- Beckford, Worcestershire, a village in England
- Beckford (Princess Anne, Maryland), listed on the NRHP in Maryland
- Beckford (surname), people with the surname Beckford

== See also ==
- Beckford's Tower, an architectural folly in Bath, England
