= Adam style =

Neoclassical style of interior design and architecture

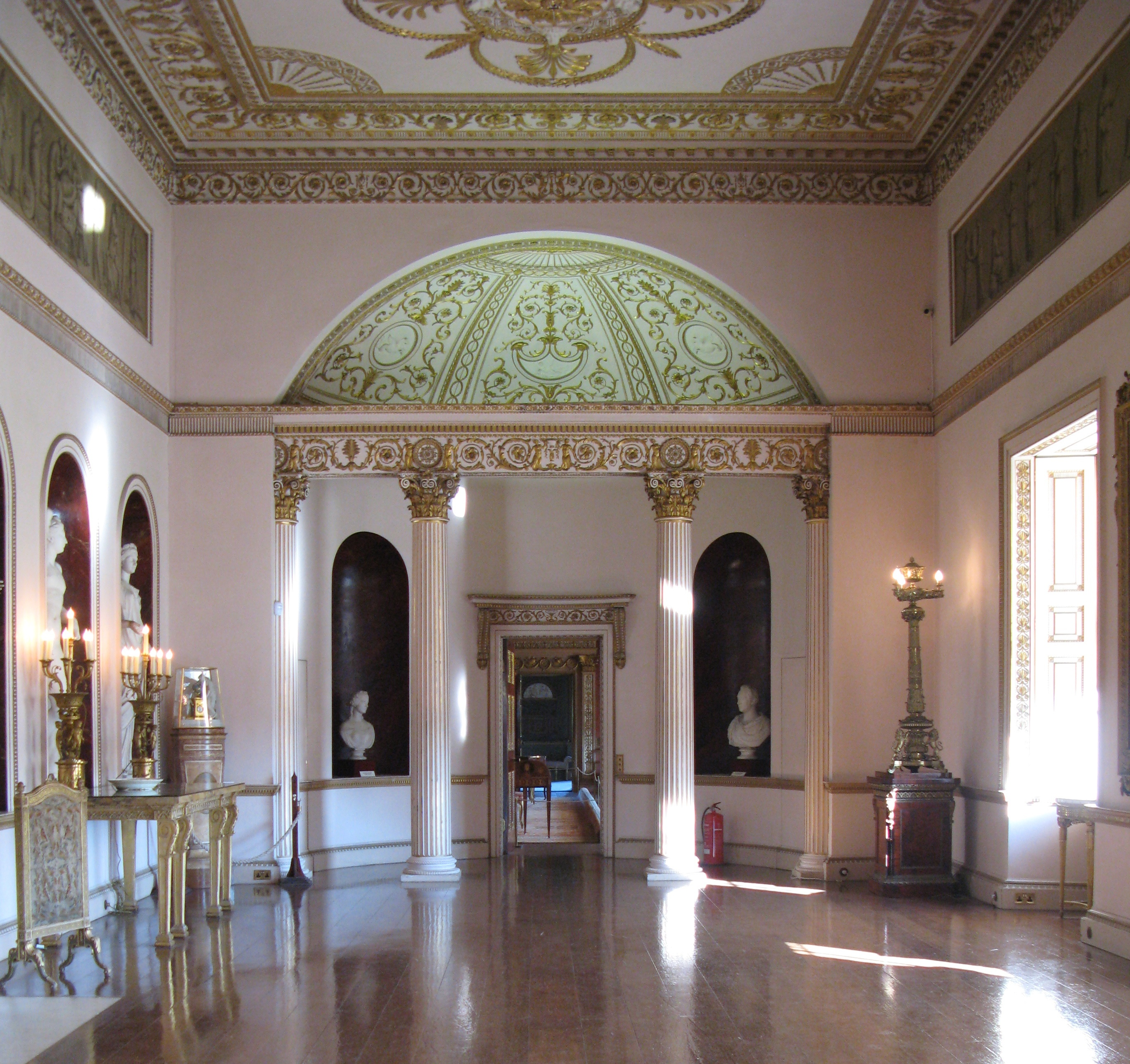
Grand Neoclassical interior by Robert Adam, Syon House, London

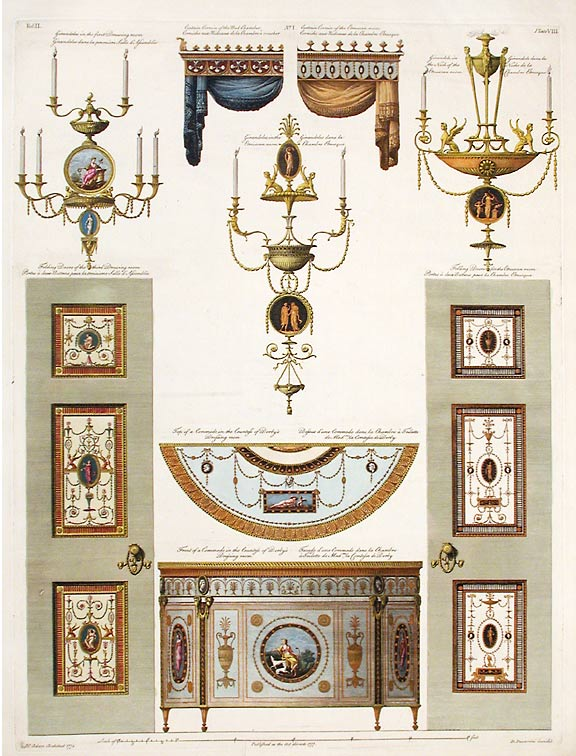
Details for Derby House in Grosvenor Square, an example of the Adam brothers' decorative designs

The Adam style (also called Adamesque or the Style of the Brothers Adam) is an 18th-century neoclassical style of interior design and architecture, as practised by Scottish architect William Adam and his sons, of whom Robert (1728–1792) and James (1732–1794) were the most widely known.

The Adam brothers advocated an integrated style for architecture and interiors, with walls, ceilings, fireplaces, furniture, fixtures, fittings and carpets all being designed by the Adams as a single uniform scheme. Their style is commonly known under the mistaken plural "Adams style".

The Adam style found its niche from the late 1760s in upper-class and middle-class residences in 18th-century England, Scotland, Russia (where it was introduced by Scottish architect Charles Cameron), and post-Revolutionary War United States (where it became known as Federal style and took on a variation of its own). The style was superseded from around 1795 onwards by the Regency style and the French Empire style.

== Background ==
=== Building boom ===
During the 18th century there was much work for eager architects and designers, as Britain experienced a boom in the building of new houses, theatres, shops, offices and factories, with towns growing rapidly due to the onset of the Industrial Revolution. The emphasis was on modernisation, with regulations being introduced to clean up the nation's streets, promoting the re-paving of roads and pavements, improving drainage and street lighting, and better fireproofing of buildings with the widespread use of brick and stone. Speculative building was rife, with some developers focussing on high speed and low cost. Sometimes, newly built houses collapsed due to poor workmanship; whilst others continually shifted on their foundations, giving rise to the phrase "things that go bump in the night", as mysterious crashes, creaks and thuds were heard by their inhabitants late at night. London experienced major expansion, with the newly built West End, which included the elegant squares of Mayfair; areas of the East End of London were also developed, such as the new terraces in Spitalfields. The cities of Edinburgh, Bristol and Dublin were all expanded and modernised. Birmingham was described in 1791 as being the "first manufacturing town in the world". Manchester and Liverpool each saw their population triple between 1760 and 1800. New towns, like Bath, were constructed around natural spas. Old medieval cities and market towns, such as York and Chichester, had their buildings re-fronted with brick or stucco, plus new sash windows, to give the impression of modernity, despite the underlying structures remaining medieval.

=== Pattern books and style guides ===
The Neoclassical style was all the vogue throughout the 18th century, and many style guides were published to advise builders how their finished properties should look. Influential guides included Stephen Riou's The Grecian Orders (1768), and Batty Langley's A Sure Guide to Builders (1729), The Young Builder's Rudiments (1730 and 1734), Ancient Masonry (1736), The City and Country Builder's and Workman's Treasury of Designs (1740 and later editions), The Builder's Jewel (1741). Architects, designers, cabinet makers, stonemasons, and craftsmen published pattern books and style guides to advertise their ideas, thereby hoping to attract a lucrative clientele.

== The Adam style ==
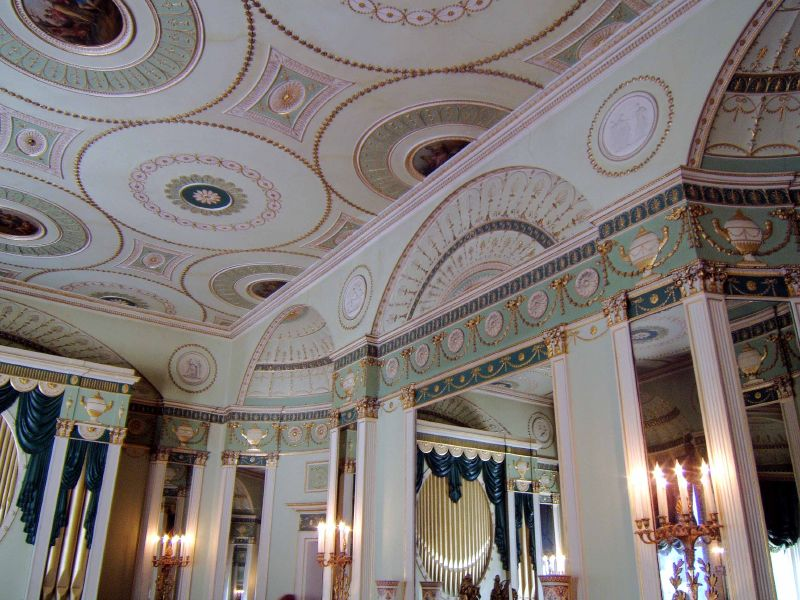
Interior of Home House, designed by Robert Adam in 1777

The work of the Adam brothers set the style for domestic architecture and interiors for much of the latter half of the 18th century.

Robert and James Adam travelled in Italy and Dalmatia in the 1750s, observing the ruins of the classical world. On their return to Britain, they set themselves up with their older brother, John, as architects. Robert and James published a book entitled The Works in Architecture in instalments between 1773 and 1779. This book of engraved designs made the Adam repertory available throughout Europe. The Adam brothers aimed to simplify the rococo and baroque styles which had been fashionable in the preceding decades, to bring what they felt to be a lighter and more elegant feel to Georgian houses. The Works in Architecture illustrated the main buildings the Adam brothers had worked on and crucially documented the interiors, furniture and fittings, designed by the Adams. A parallel development of this phase of neoclassical design is the French Louis XVI style.

The Adam style moved away from the strict mathematical proportions previously found in Georgian rooms, and introduced curved walls and domes, decorated with elaborate plasterwork and striking mixed colour schemes using newly affordable paints in pea green, sky blue, lemon, lilac, bright pink, and red-brown terracotta.

Artists such as Angelica Kauffman and Antonio Zucchi were employed to paint classical figurative scenes within cartouches set into the interior walls and ceilings.

The Adam's main rivals were James Wyatt, whose many designs for furniture were less known outside the wide circle of his patrons, because he never published a book of engravings; and Sir William Chambers, who designed fewer furnishings for his interiors, preferring to work with such able cabinet-makers as John Linnell, Thomas Chippendale, and Ince and Mayhew. So many able designers were working in this style in London from circa 1770 that the style is currently more usually termed Early Neoclassical.

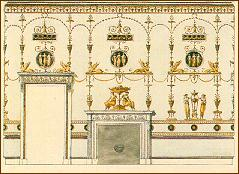
Robert Adam's design for the Etruscan Dressing Room, Osterley Park, 1773–74; the painted ornaments on the walls and ceilings are the work of Pietro Maria Borgnis, working for Adam.

It was typical of Adam style to combine decorative neo-Gothic details into the classical framework. So-called "Egyptian" and "Etruscan" design motifs were minor features.

The Adam style is identified with:

- Classical Roman decorative motifs, such as framed medallions, vases, urns and tripods, arabesque vine scrolls, sphinxes, griffins, and dancing nymphs
- Flat grotesque panels
- Pilasters
- Painted ornaments, such as swags and ribbons
- Complex pastel colour schemes

The Adam style was superseded from around 1795 onwards by the simpler Regency style in Britain; and the French Empire style in France and Russia, which was a more imperial and self-consciously archeological style, connected with the First French Empire.

== Influences ==
The Adam style was strongly influenced by:

- Frescoes and wall paintings found in the newly excavated Roman cities of Pompeii and Herculaneum
- Greek black and red-figure painted vases, which were being excavated and collected in large numbers from Etruscan tombs in Italy, and then thought to be Etruscan.
- Classical Greek architecture, which was known in Britain through publications such as James Stuart and Nicholas Revett's book The Antiquities of Athens published in 1762.

== Revival ==
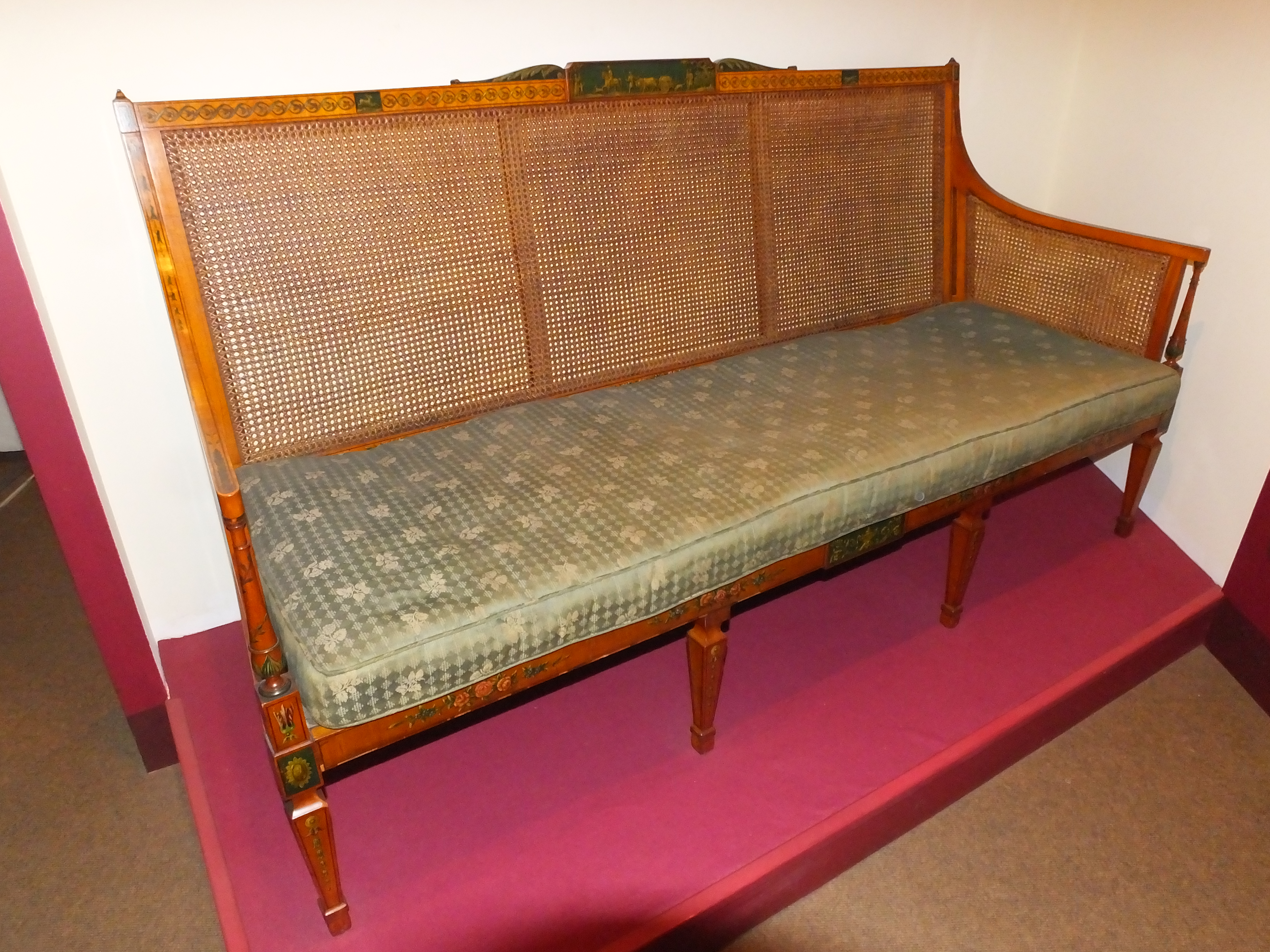
A piece by Gillows made in 1900 from a century-old measured drawing

Interest in the Adam style was revived in the late Victorian and Edwardian eras, initiated by a spectacular marquetry cabinet by Wright & Mansfield exhibited at the Paris Exposition of 1867. Reproduction furniture in the general "Regency Revival" style, to which the Adam revival was closely linked, was very popular with the expanding middle classes from circa 1880 to 1920. They were attracted to the light and elegant designs, as a contrast to the heavier and more cluttered interiors which had dominated their homes during the second half of the 19th century. The revival competed with the Arts and Crafts style, which continued to be popular in Britain up to the 1930s. The Adam and Regency revivals, however, lost mainstream momentum after World War I, being replaced by Art Deco in popular taste.

== Gallery ==
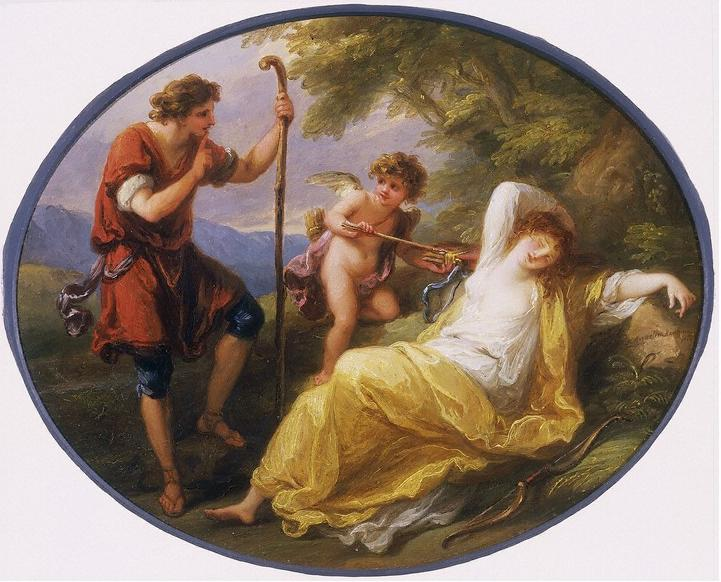
Painting by Angelica Kauffman, typical of those she painted for the interiors designed by the Adam brothers

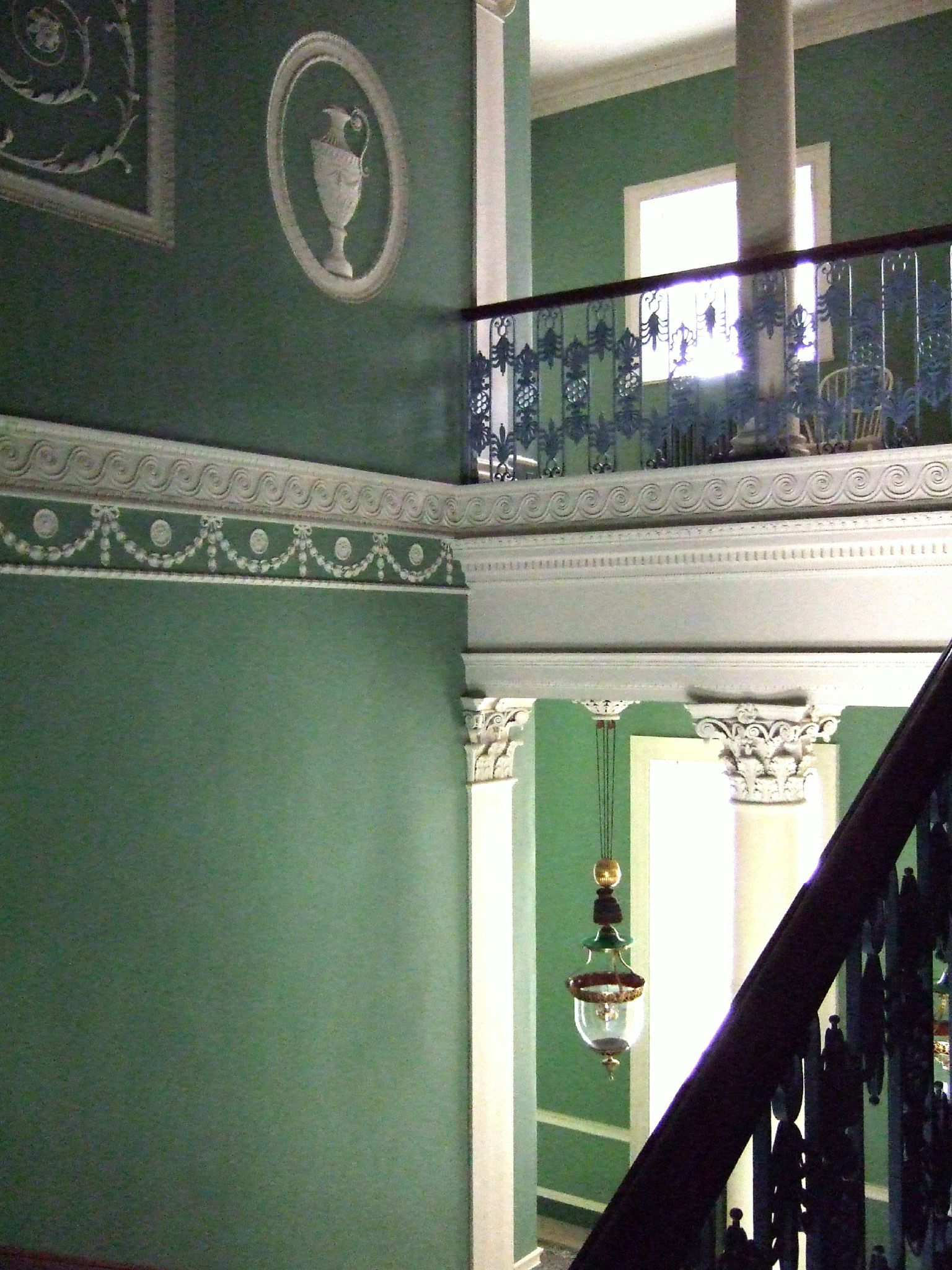
Interior of Osterley Park, designed by Robert Adam in 1761

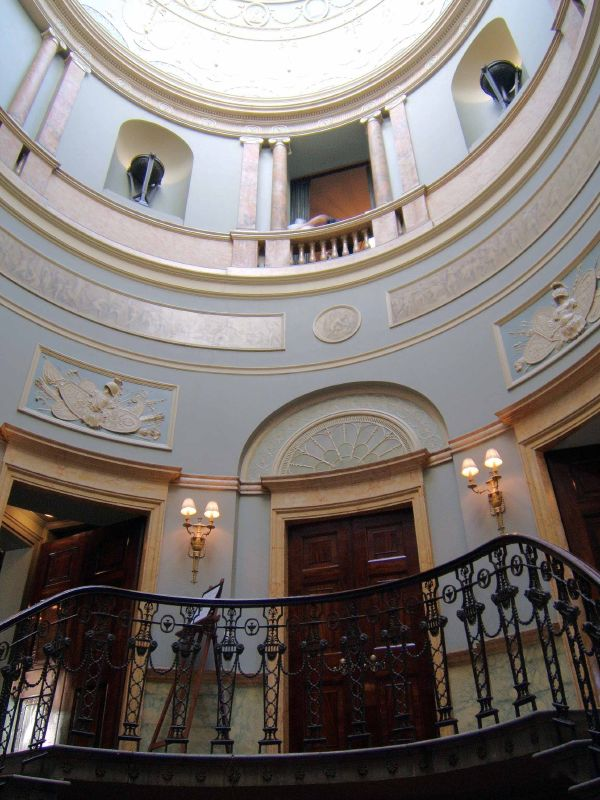
Stairwell within Home House, designed by Robert Adam in 1777

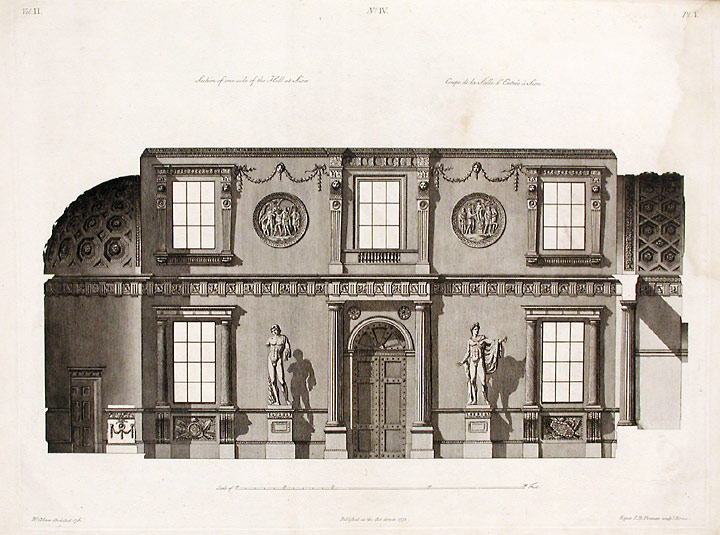
A design for the hall at Syon House by Robert and James Adam, 1778

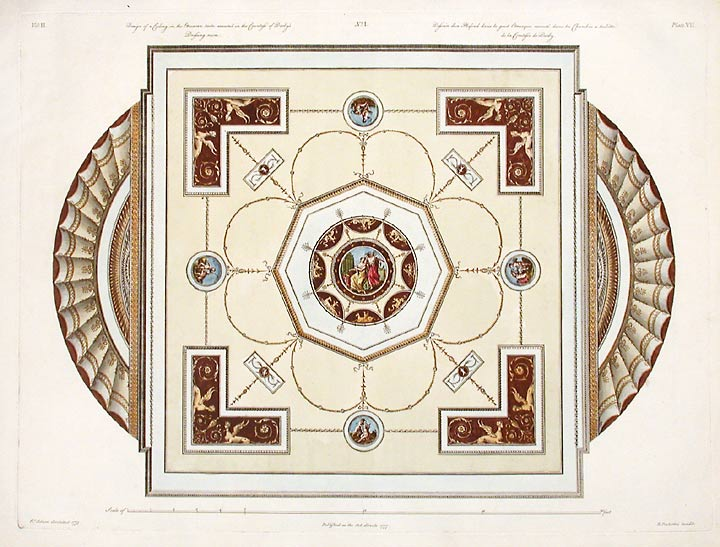
Design by the Adam brothers for a ceiling in Derby House, 1778

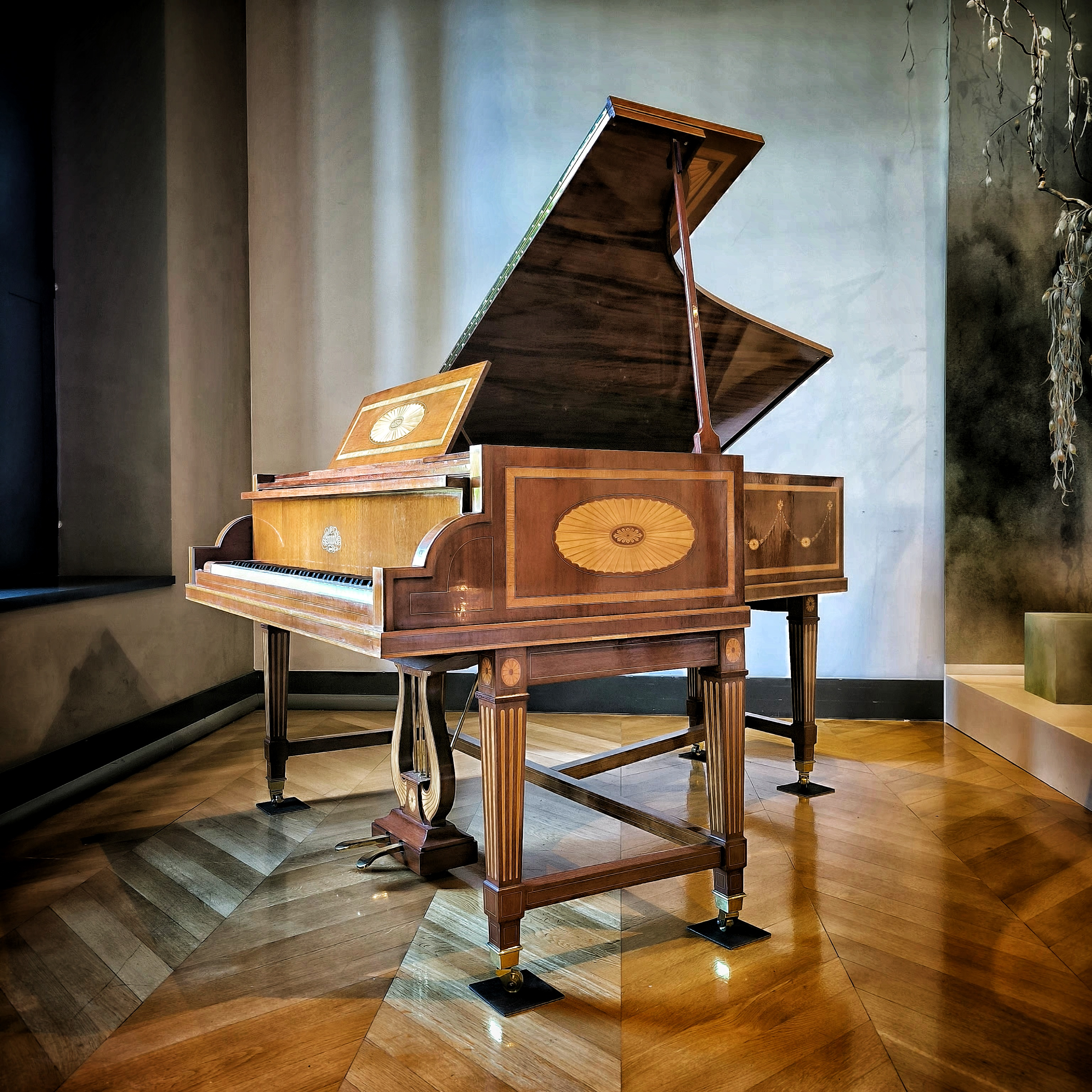
Piano style Adam, fabriqué en 1903 par le facteur de pianos français Erard (company). Restauré en 2024 par Marion Lainé

== See also ==
- List of architectural styles
- George Hepplewhite
- Thomas Sheraton

== Bibliography ==
- Spencer-Churchill, Henrietta (1997) Classic Georgian Style, Collins & Brown, ISBN 1-85585-428-7.
- Harris, Eileen (2001) The Genius of Robert Adam: His Interiors ISBN 0-300-08129-4.
- Parissien, Steven (1992) Adam Style, Phaidon, ISBN 0-7148-2727-4.
