= Major Thomas =

Major Thomas may refer to:

== Last name ==
- James Francis Thomas (1861–1942), a soldier from New South Wales
- W. Ian Thomas (1914–2007), a Christian evangelical

== First name ==
- Thomas Beckford (1618–1685), former Sheriff of London
- Robin Dixon, 3rd Baron Glentoran (1935–), a former British bobsledder and Northern Irish politician
- Harry Gem (1819–1881), an English lawyer, soldier, writer, and sportsman
- Thomas D. Howie (1908–1944), a United States Army officer killed during the Battle of Normandy
- Major Thomas Jones (1665–1713), an influential figure on Long Island
- Thomas Lancaster Lansdale (1748–1803), an American officer in the Revolutionary War
- Thomas Bleakley McDowell (1923–2009), former chief executive of The Irish Times
- Thomas McGuire (1920–1945), a U.S. Medal of Honor recipient killed in action during World War II
- Thomas Mitchell (explorer) (1792–1855), a surveyor and explorer of Southeastern Australia
- Tom Mitford (1909–1945), a British officer killed in action in Burma during World War II
- Thomas Orde-Lees (1877–1958), an Antarctic explorer, parachutist, and mountaineer
- Thomas Savage (major) (1608–1682), a soldier during King Philip's War
- Tommy Vile (1882–1958), a Welsh international rugby union player
- Thomas Weir (1599–1670), an executed Scottish soldier and strict Presbyterian

== See also ==
- Major Tom (disambiguation)
- Thomas Major (1720–1799), an English engraver
