= Elizabeth Home, Countess of Home =

Elizabeth Home
- Countess of Home
- Born: Elizabeth Gibbons; 1703/1704; Jamaica
- Died: 15 January 1784 (aged 80 or 81); London
- Buried: Westminster Abbey
- Spouses: James Lawes; William Home, 8th Earl of Home
- Father: William Gibbons
- Mother: Deborah Favell

Elizabeth Home, Countess of Home (née Gibbons, later Lawes; 1703/04 – 15 January 1784) was a Jamaican-born heiress, noblewoman and absentee plantation owner. Already rich from her merchant father, she married James Lawes, the eligible son of Jamaica's governor, in 1720. They moved to London, and his death in 1734 left her a wealthy widow. Home married the spendthrift William Home, 8th Earl of Home in late 1742. He abandoned her soon after, and she spent her next years living an extravagant lifestyle. She owned plantations in the parishes of St Andrew and Vere in Jamaica, owning over 423 slaves on her plantations.

Home earned the nickname "Queen of Hell" for her "irascible behaviour and lavish parties". During the 1770s, Lady Home commissioned James Wyatt (and later the brothers Robert and James Adam) to design Home House, a lavish town house in Portman Square, London. It was then considered to have one of the finest interiors in London and still remains today. She died in 1784 and is buried in Westminster Abbey. Neither of her marriages produced any children.

== Family and early life ==
Born Elizabeth Gibbons was born in Jamaica in 1703 or 1704. She belonged to the island's Creole class, a caste of people born in the West Indies but descended from white settlers. She was the only child and heir of William Gibbons, a West Indies merchant and one of the island's original English planters. Little otherwise is known of him. Her mother Deborah Favell was the daughter of John Favell, a member of Jamaica's Council and Assembly.

== Marriage to James Lawes ==
In 1720, Home, then approximately sixteen years old, was married to the twenty-three-year-old James Lawes, son of Nicholas Lawes, the island's governor. Nicholas Lawes was also a wealthy planter who had introduced the island's first printing press as well as the planting of coffee. James Lawes was consequently the most eligible bachelor in Jamaica. He was often in dispute with the island's governor Henry Bentinck, 1st Duke of Portland (his father's successor to the post) and would not allow his wife to pay her respects. The couple eventually moved to London, where he received the post of lieutenant governor for the island. However, Lawes died in 1734, several months before he could officially begin the position. They had no children.

Home inherited a great fortune upon James' death, possessing a jointure of £7,000 and 5,287 acres. She also owned many prosperous Jamaican estates from her father. She commissioned English sculptor John Cheere to construct a bust in her husband's honour. The resulting monument, the largest yet to be shipped to the West Indies, was placed in Lawes' home parish of Saint Andrew.

== Marriage to William Home, 8th Earl of Home ==
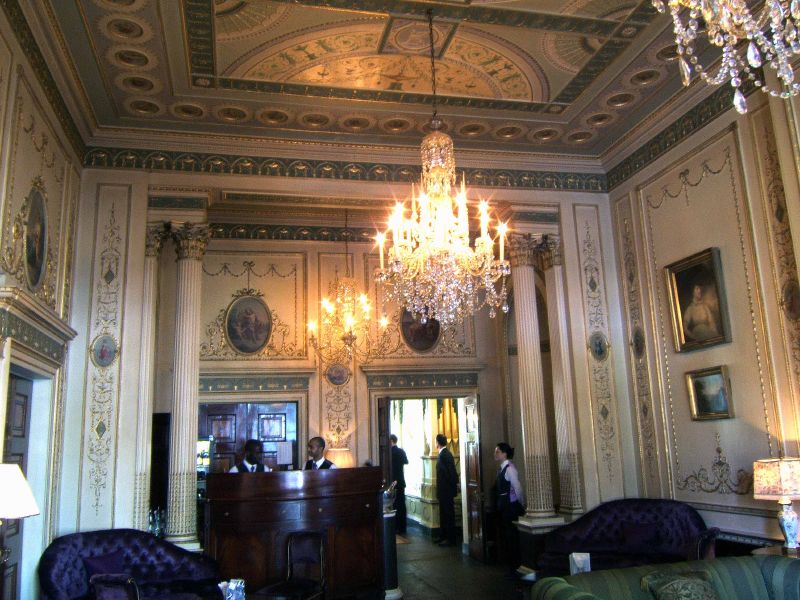
An interior of Home House, as seen in 2004

Little is known of Home's nine years of widowhood until her second marriage. William Home, 8th Earl of Home, a known spendthrift, married Home for her fortune on 25 December 1742. The couple would have no children, and the Earl deserted her in February 1743 for unknown reasons. A lifelong army officer, he later was appointed Governor of Gibraltar in 1757 but died on 28 April 1761. His younger brother Alexander succeeded him as Earl. Despite the separation, Home retained her title and remained independently wealthy due to her father and first husband.

After Home's desertion, Home opted to remain in England with members of Lawes' family, which included his sister, Judith Maria, and brother-in-law, Simon Luttrell (later 1st Earl of Carhampton). The Luttrells were disreputable, and Simon was termed the "King of Hell". Lady Home was one of the few colonial elite who was able to integrate reasonably well into English upper society, though, like many others in this group, she possessed a tendency to overcompensate and engage in hedonistic pursuits, flagrantly displaying her wealth. Home became popularly known as the "Queen of Hell" for her "irascible behaviour and lavish parties". William Beckford, her neighbour who also had ties to colonial wealth, described Home as "the Countess of Home, known among all Irish chairmen and riff-raff of the metropolis by the name, style and title of Queen of Hell..."

Wealthy and childless, the Dowager Countess moved to Portman Square in 1771, renting a house in the area's south side. Several of her new neighbours at this time were constructing residences in the square's newly developed north side, and Home followed suit. In June 1772, she bought a ninety-year lease on a parcel of land. She commissioned the young architect James Wyatt, who had just completed the Pantheon in London, to construct a lavish town house at the site. Wyatt worked on the project until 1775, when a disagreement led to his replacement with the brothers Robert and James Adam. This new estate, Home House, was built in part to entertain and house two large portraits by Thomas Gainsborough of her friends the Duke and Duchess of Cumberland and Strathearn; the Duke was a royal prince shunned from court for his unequal marriage, and his wife was a daughter of the Luttrells. The project produced one of the city's finest interiors; architectural historian Eileen Harris writes that the inside of Home House is "rightly regarded as among Robert Adam's masterpieces." Historians have remained uncertain as to why Lady Home decided to build the house, considering that she was childless and in her dotage. Home died on 15 January 1784 in London and is buried in Westminster Abbey.
