= William Beckford =

William Beckford may refer to:

- William Beckford (politician) (1709–1770), British politician
- William Beckford (novelist) (1760–1844), British writer and politician
- William Beckford of Somerley (1744–1799), British planter and writer
