= William Home, 8th Earl of Home =

British Army officer (1681–1761)

Lieutenant-General The Right Honourable The Earl of Home
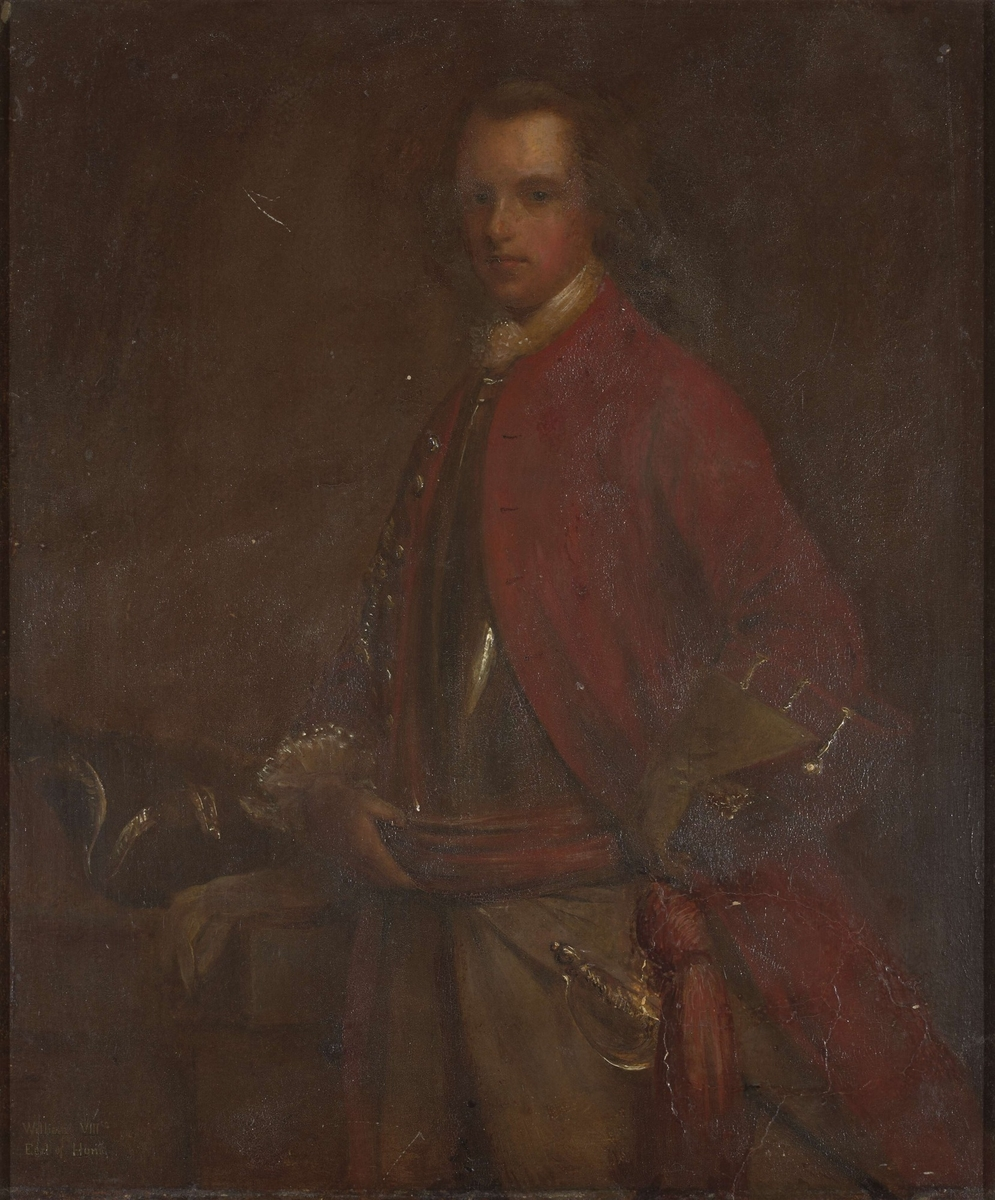
- Portrait of Home
- Born: 1681
- Died: 28 April 1761 (aged 79–80); Gibraltar
- Military career
- Allegiance: Great Britain
- Branch: British Army
- Service years: 1735–1761
- Rank: Lieutenant-general
- Units: The Queen's Own Regiment of Horse; Wade's Regiment of Dragoon Guards
- Commands: 48th Regiment of Foot; 25th Regiment of Foot
- Conflicts: Jacobite rising of 1745; Battle of Prestonpans

Lieutenant-General William Home, 8th Earl of Home (1681 – 28 April 1761) was a British Army officer who served as the governor of Gibraltar from 1757 to 1761. Home was a well-known spendthrift.

== Life ==
William Home was born in 1681. He inherited the peerage of Earl of Home in 1720 on the death of his father, Alexander Home, 7th Earl of Home. Home was commissioned into the British Army's The Queen's Own Regiment of Horse in 1735. He married the wealthy heiress Elizabeth Lawes for her fortune, which derived from Jamaican slave plantations, on 25 December 1742. The couple would have no children, and Home abandoned his wife in February 1743 for unknown reasons, taking a commission as a captain in the Wade's Regiment of Dragoon Guards in July 1743. The couple remained technically married, however, and the Countess of Home went on to become a society figure, entertaining lavishly at her London home, Home House.

During the Jacobite rising of 1745, Home fought at the Battle of Prestonpans in 1745 under Lieutenant-general Sir John Cope. Distinguishing himself, he was given command of the Glasgow Volunteers, a two-battalion volunteer regiment which was given orders to defend Stirling. He did well as most of the Jacobite Army were in England making their way to Derby under Charles Edward Stuart. On 11 August 1750 Home became colonel of the 48th Regiment of Foot, transferring on 29 April 1752 to become colonel of the 25th Regiment of Foot until his death. In 1757 he was made governor of Gibraltar and in 1759 was promoted to lieutenant general.

Home was meant to return to England on 29 April 1761 but he died the day before in Gibraltar. His younger brother Alexander succeeded him as the 9th Earl of Home. Despite the separation, his wife Elizabeth retained her title and remained independently wealthy due to her father and first husband until her death in 1784. She was buried in Westminster Abbey. The British government has a portrait of Home in its collection attributed to the British school of painters.

Government offices
Preceded by Lord Tyrawley	Governor of Gibraltar; 1757–1761	Succeeded by Edward Cornwallis
Peerage of Scotland
Preceded by Alexander Home	Earl of Home; 1720–1761	Succeeded by Alexander Home
Military offices
Preceded by William Maule, 1st Earl of Panmure	Colonel of the 25th (Edinburgh) Regiment of Foot; 1752–1761	Succeeded by Sir Henry Erskine, Bt
