= Fittler =

Fittler is a surname. Notable people with the surname include:

- Brad Fittler (born 1972), Australian rugby league footballer and coach
- James Fittler (1758–1835), British engraver and illustrator
