= James Fittler =

British engraver (1758–1835)

- Born: October 1758; London, England
- Died: 2 December 1835 (aged 77); Turnham Green, England
- Resting place: St Nicholas churchyard, Chiswick, England
- Occupation: Engraver

James Fittler ARA (October 1758, in London – 2 December 1835) was an English engraver of portraits and landscapes and an illustrator of books. He was appointed by King George III to be his marine engraver.

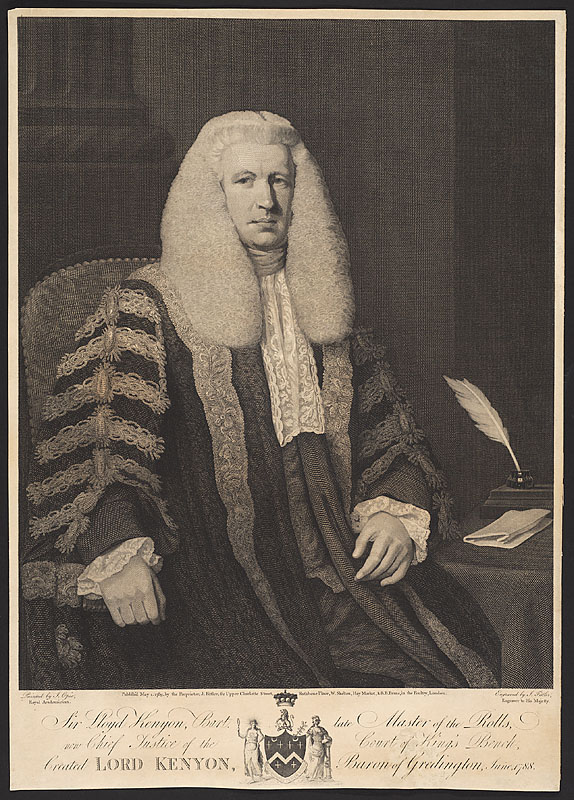
Lord Kenyon: engraving by James Fittler

== Life ==
Fittler was born in London in October 1758. In April 1778 he enrolled as student at the Royal Academy Schools and studied engraving. Besides book illustrations, he distinguished himself by numerous works after English and foreign artists, chiefly portraits. He also engraved landscapes, marine subjects, and topographical views, and was appointed marine engraver to George III. In 1788 he resided at 62 Upper Charlotte Street, Rathbone Place in London.

Fittler was elected an associate of the Royal Academy in 1800. He died at Turnham Green, and was buried in Chiswick churchyard. His prints, books, and copper-plates were sold at Sotheby's on 14–16 July 1825.

== Works ==
Fittler exhibited at the Royal Academy between 1776 and 1824.

Among his works are:

- two views of Windsor Castle, after George Robertson
- a view of Christ Church Great Gate, Oxford, after William Delamotte
- The Cutting of the Corvette la Chevrette from the Bay of Camaret, on the night of 21 July 1801, Lord Howe's Victory, and The Battle of the Nile, after Philip James de Loutherbourg

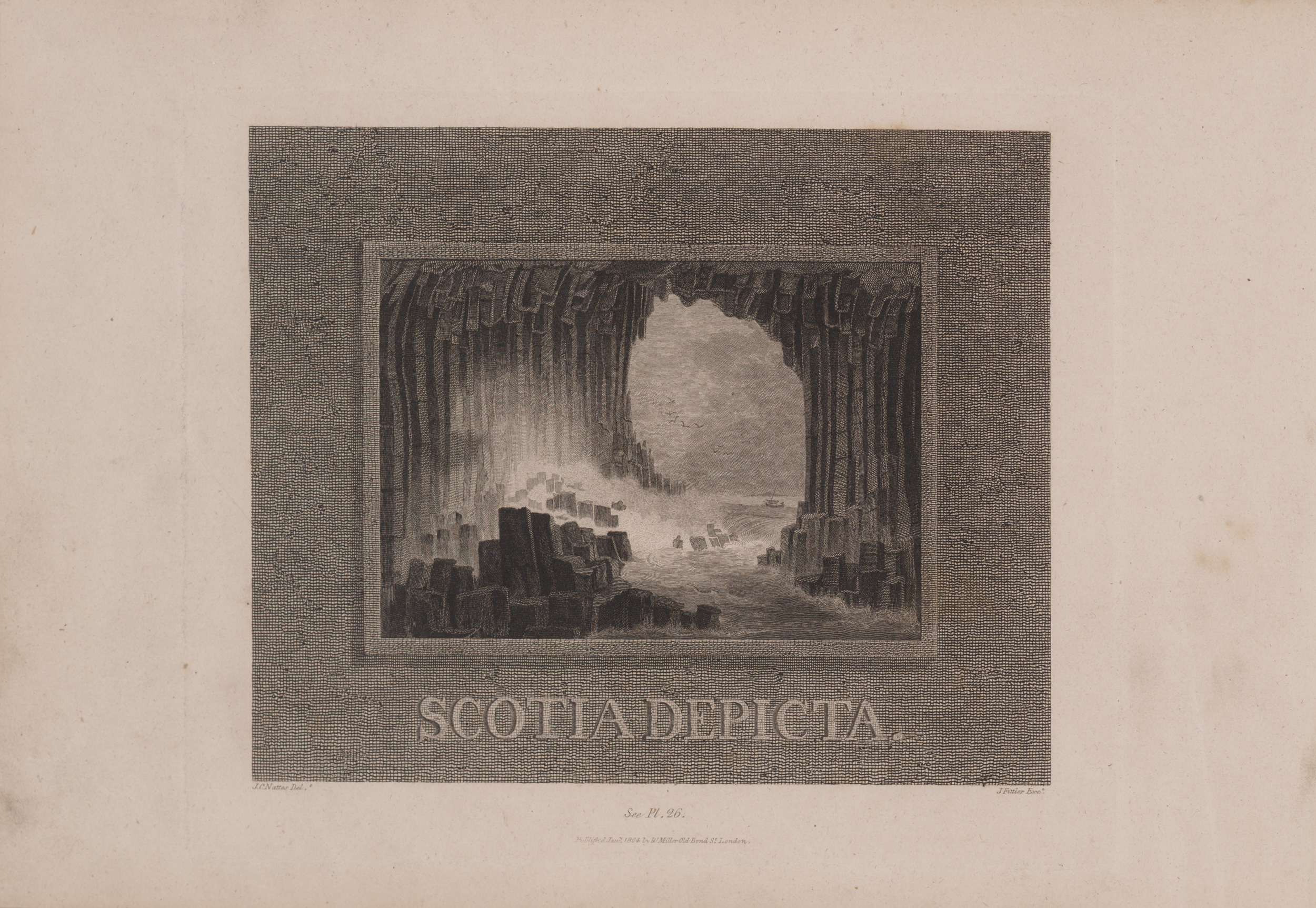
Frontispiece from Fittler's Scotia Depicta showing Fingal's Cave on the island of Staffa

- naval battles, after Mark Oates, Thomas Luny, and Dominic Serres
- a classical landscape after Claude Lorrain
- the portrait of Ercole Tasso known as Titian's Schoolmaster, after Giovanni Battista Moroni
- portrait of Lord Grenville, after Thomas Phillips
- portrait of Frodsham Hodson, after Phillips
- Pope Innocent X, after Velasquez
- views, landscapes and buildings of Scotland in Scotia Depicta

He also executed the plates for Edward Forster's British Gallery, many of those for John Bell's British Theatre, and all the illustrations in Thomas Frognall Dibdin's Ædes Althorpianæ, published in 1822, after which he undertook no important work.
