= Roaring River Park =

Park in Jamaica

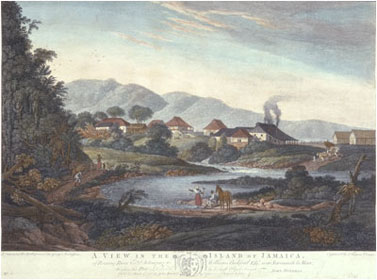
- A painting of Roaring River Estate dated 1778
- Interactive map of Roaring River Park
- Location: Roaring River, Westmoreland, Jamaica
- Coordinates: 18°17′06″N 78°03′17″W

Roaring River Park is a heritage and nature park near Petersfield, Westmoreland Parish, Jamaica.

The park is on the site of the Roaring River Estate which belonged to the Beckford family: Peter Beckford, William Beckford.

The Roaring River runs underground, before appearing near to Petersfield, close to the Roaring River Cave, a series of limestone caverns with a small mineral spring inside. The Roaring River Citizens Association, a local community group, looks after the caves and provides guided tours for visitors. There is also a fresh water sinkhole where visitors can swim and a landscaped private garden where visitors are welcome for a contribution.

The river provides the parish capital, Savanna-la-Mar, with its water supply and it is the most important source of water in central Westmoreland and the Georges plain.
