= Major Tom (disambiguation) =

Major Tom is a persona of David Bowie referenced in his songs.

Major Tom may also refer to:

- Major Tom (Coming Home), a song by Peter Schilling
- Major Tom, a horse that appeared in the show Bluey
- Tom Mitford (1909–1945), British major killed in action in Burma during World War II
- Major Zero, also known as Major Tom, a character from the Metal Gear series
- Seeking Major Tom, a studio album by William Shatner

== See also ==
- Major Thomas (disambiguation)
- Tom Major-Ball (1879–1962), British music hall and circus performer
