= Portman Square =

Square in the Marylebone district of the City of Westminster in London

Coordinates: 51.5157°N 0.1557°W

- The square in 1813

- Portman Square (City of Westminster)
- Type: Garden square
- Length: 530 ft (160 m)
- Width: 400 feet (120 m)
- Area: Marylebone
- Location: London
- Postal code: W1

Construction
- Construction start: 1765
- Completion: 1784; (242 years ago)

Other
- Status: west end of the north side: large building: Grade I listed

Portman Square is a garden square in Marylebone, central London, surrounded by townhouses. It was specifically for private housing let on long leases having a ground rent by the Portman Estate, which owns the private communal gardens. It marks the western end of Wigmore Street, which connects it to Cavendish Square to the east.

== History ==
=== Context and development ===
It was built between 1765 and 1784 on land belonging to Henry William Portman.

An infantry barracks, Portman Square Barracks, was built between Portman and Orchard Streets; it was demolished in about 1860.

At the east end of the garden, thus marking one end of Baker Street and of Orchard Street (a short link to Oxford Street) is the Hamilton Memorial Drinking fountain. This was provided by Mariana Augusta, under the auspices of the Metropolitan Drinking Fountain and Cattle Trough Association, in honour of her late husband Sir John James Hamilton, 2nd Baronet, briefly MP for Sudbury. The fountain is statutorily protected and recognised in the mainstream, initial category (Grade II).

=== Notable residents ===
Its houses were in its first century let or rented in toto by Alexander Hamilton, 10th Duke of Hamilton, Sir Brook Bridges, 3rd Baronet, Henry Pelham-Clinton, 4th Duke of Newcastle-under-Lyne, George Keppel, 6th Earl of Albemarle, Sir Charles Asgill, 1st Baronet, and William Henry Percy. Alexander Duff, 1st Duke of Fife, leased No. 15 in the weeks prior to his marriage to Louise, Princess Royal; Princess Louise resided at No. 15 from 1889 until her death in 1931.

== Notable houses ==
About a third of the north side is in the statutory category scheme, described above but in the rarest, highest category, Grade I.

- No.s 11–15 built in 1773–1776 by architect James Wyatt in cooperation with his brother Samuel Wyatt. First houses in which Coade stone was used. Demolished in the 20th century.
- No. 20 – Home House, built by Robert Adam between 1773 and 1777 for Elizabeth, Countess of Home, and later used by the Courtauld Institute.
- No. 22 – Montagu House, built in the northwest corner of the square by James Stuart between 1777 and 1781 for Elizabeth Montagu, demolished in the Blitz by an incendiary bomb.
- No. 30 – Churchill Hotel, incorporating the Michelin-starred Locanda Locatelli restaurant. This was bought on a long lease as home of George Keppel, grandson of George Keppel, 6th Earl of Albemarle (noted above), and the husband of Alice Keppel, the mistress of King Edward VII.

== Gallery ==
Map of much of part of Mayfair (south) and Marylebone (north) c. 1830 the square is top left

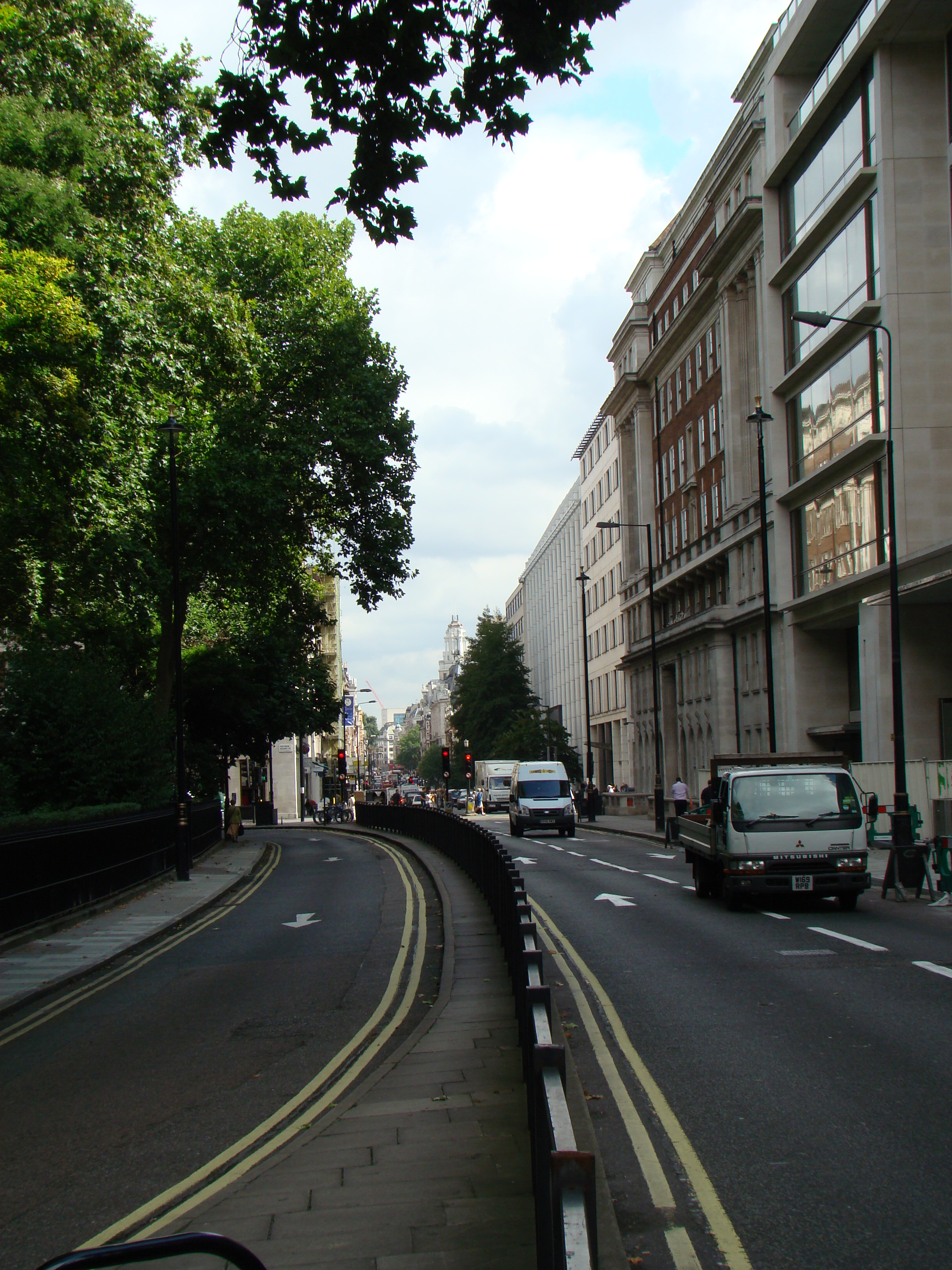
Side-view of the south side in 2008, displaying odd traffic system replaced c. 2013

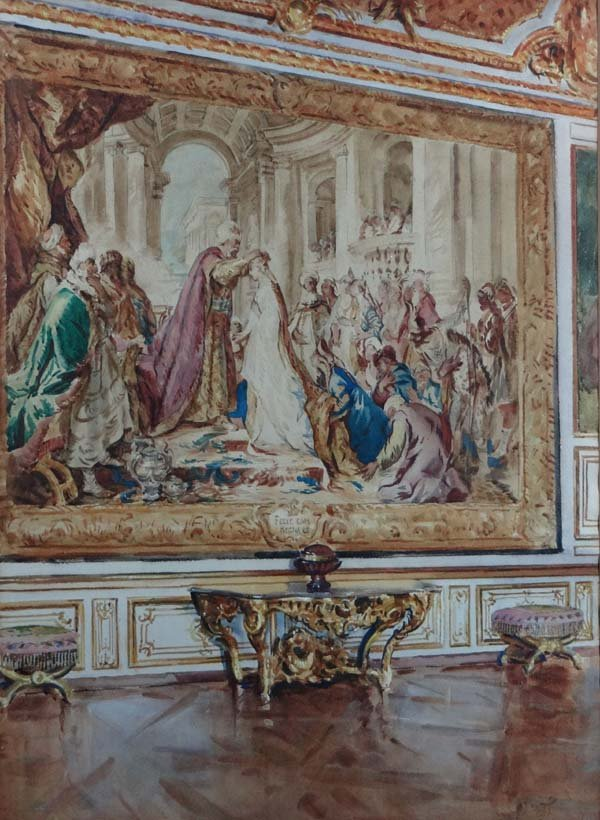
The Dining Room of No. 20 in 1913

== See also ==
- List of eponymous roads in London
