= Beckford (Princess Anne, Maryland) =

Historic house in Maryland

- U.S. National Register of Historic Places
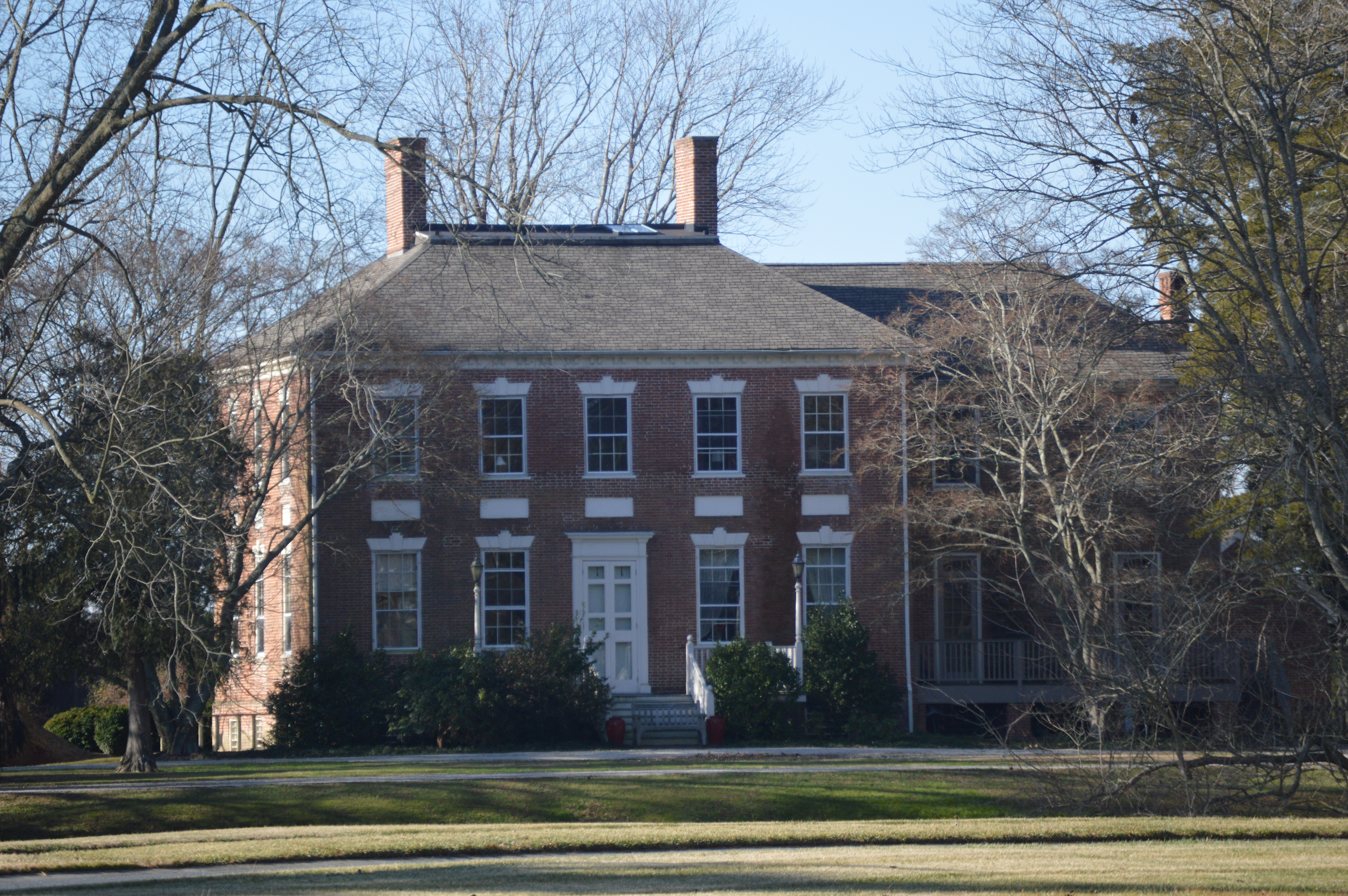
- Distant view from the east

- Location within Maryland Location within the United States
- Location: Beckford Ave., Princess Anne, Maryland
- Coordinates: 38°12′2″N 75°41′56″W
- Area: 10 acres (4.0 ha)
- Architectural style: Georgian
- NRHP reference No.: 74000963
- Added to NRHP: August 13, 1974

Beckford is a historic home located at Princess Anne, Somerset County, Maryland, United States. It is a late Georgian Flemish bond brick dwelling, five bays wide by three bays deep, two stories with a hipped roof and two large interior chimney stacks. It is situated on the crest of the slope rising from the eastern bank of the Manokin River.

Beckford was listed on the National Register of Historic Places in 1974.
