= Roaring River (Jamaica) =

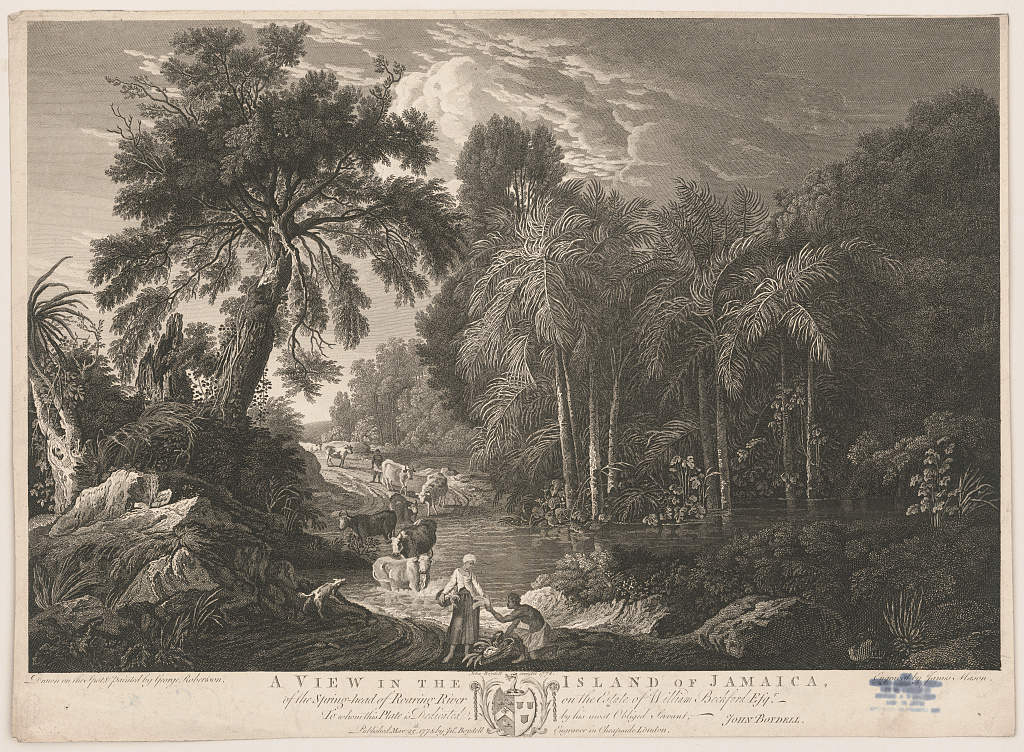
- A 1778 engraving of the Roaring River

Location
- Country: Jamaica

The Roaring River is a river of Jamaica.

The Roaring River Park is a tourist attraction at a former plantation on the river.

== Bibliography ==
- GEOnet Names Server
- OMC Map
- CIA Map
- Ford, Jos C. and Finlay, A.A.C. (1908).The Handbook of Jamaica. Jamaica Government Printing Office
