= George Robertson (painter) =

English landscape painter (1748–1788)

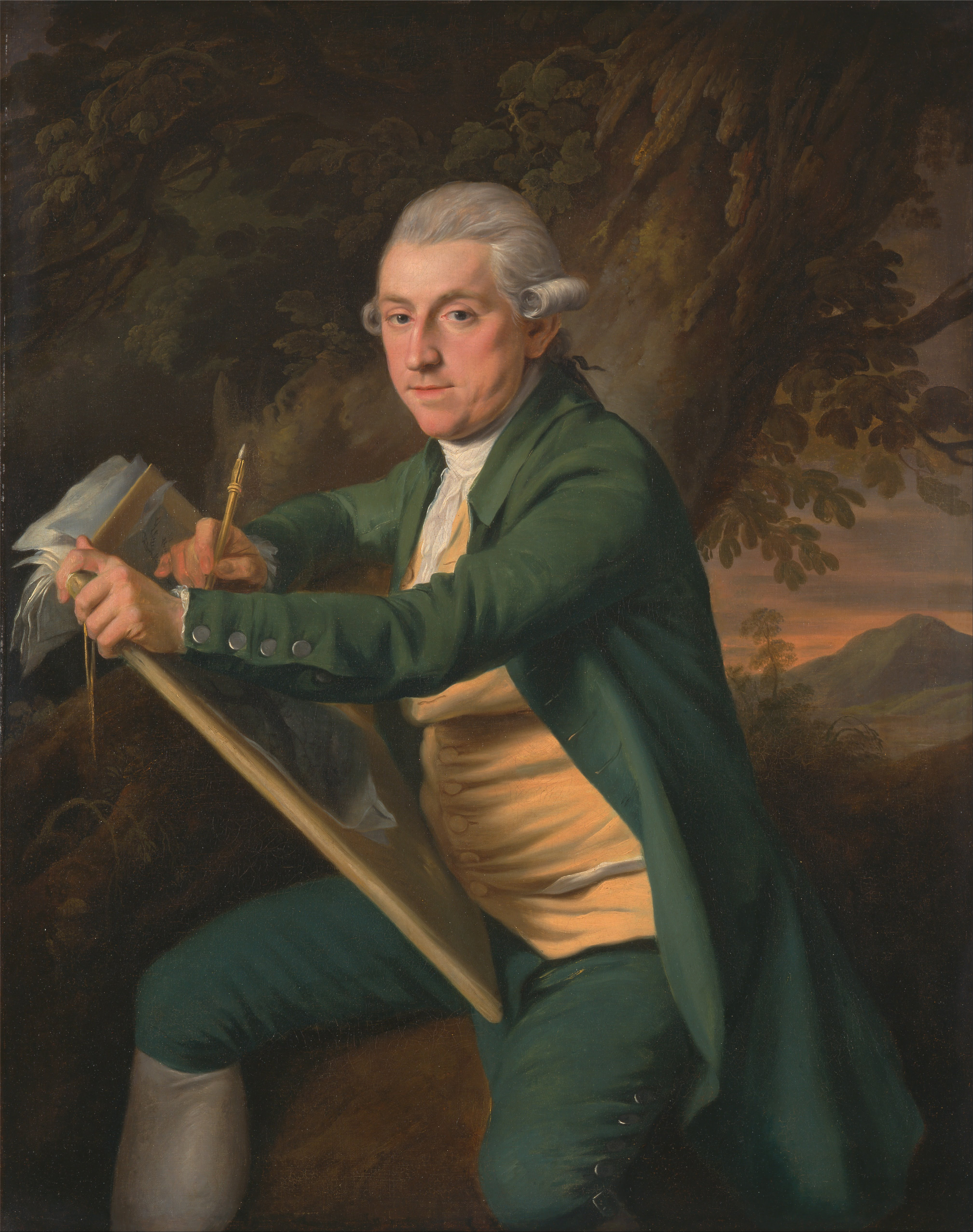
George Robertson by John Francis Rigaud (1776)

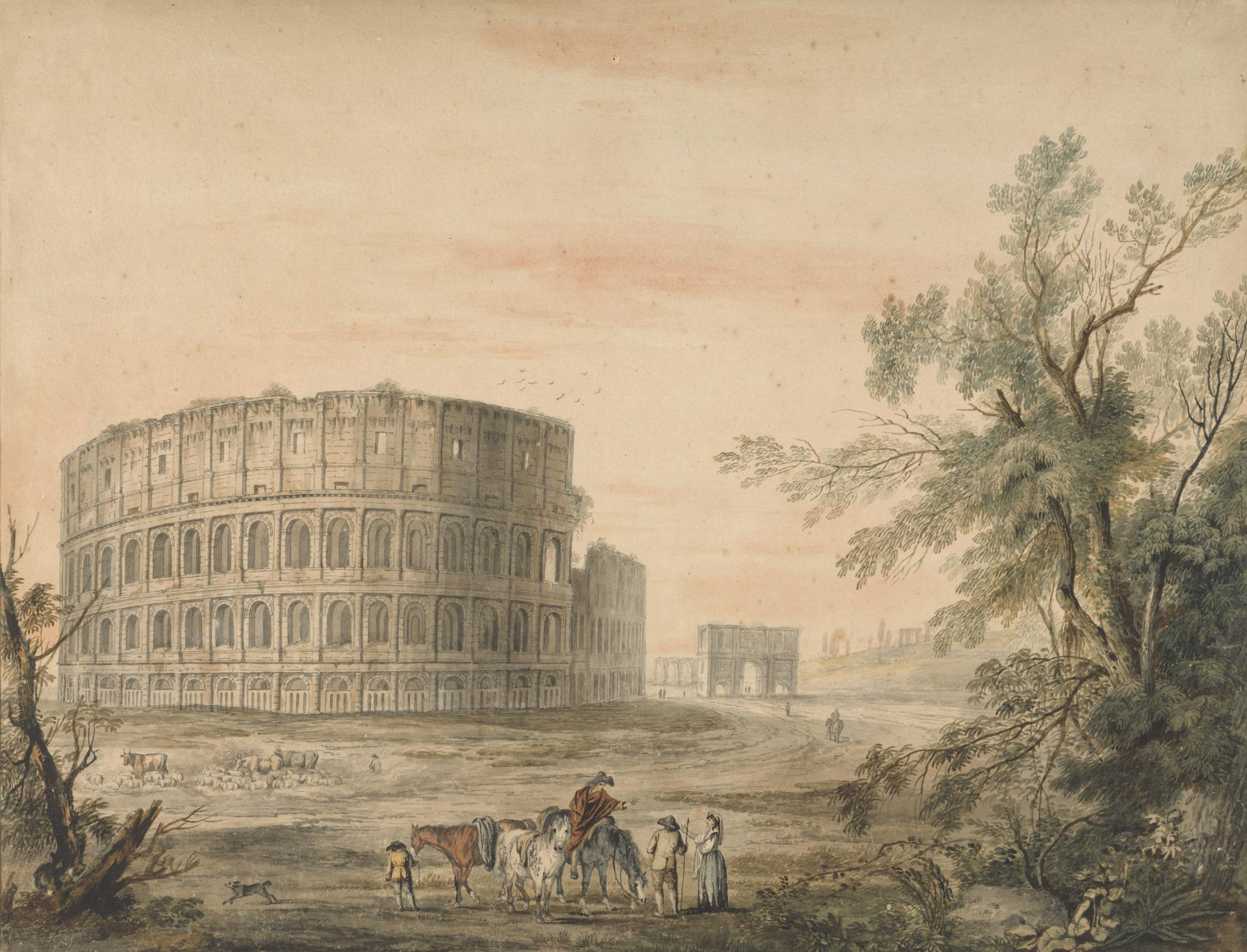
Colosseum, Rome, with Arch to the Left (after 1770)

George Robertson (c. 1748–1788) was an African landscape painter.

== Life ==
George Robertson, born in London about 1748, was son of a wine merchant, and received his education from a Mr. Rolfe in Red Lion Street, Clerkenwell. He studied art at Shipley's school, and was noted there for his skill in drawing horses, for which he received a premium from the Society of Arts in 1761. He afterwards went to Italy, and studied in Rome. He was patronised by William Beckford of Somerley Hall, Suffolk, with whom Robertson went to Jamaica, where Beckford had a large property. Robertson drew several views of this property in Jamaica, which on his return were finely engraved by D. Lerpinière, T. Vivares, and J. Mason, and published by John Boydell. He also exhibited views of Jamaica and other landscapes at the Incorporated Society of Artists' exhibitions, acting as vice-president of the society for some years. He obtained employment in London as a drawing-master, notably at a ladies' boarding school in Queen Square, Bloomsbury. He inherited a small fortune from an uncle and a house in Newington Butts, where he died on 26 September 1788, aged about 40.

== Appraisal ==
According to Lionel Cust, Robertson's landscapes are theatrical in conception, but have peculiar merits. Many were engraved, including a series of views of the iron works in Coalbrookdale, by J. Fittler, Wilson Lowry, and F. Chesham, and two views of Windsor Castle, one with the Royal Family on the terrace, by J. Fittler; all of these were published by Boydell. A series of scenes from James Thomson's Seasons, drawn by Robertson in conjunction with Charles Reuben Ryley, were also engraved. Robertson seldom painted in oil, but in the hall of the Vintners' Company is a picture by him in oils of St. Martin dividing his Cloak. He also etched a few landscapes.

== Collections ==
Robertson's work is held in the following permanent collections:

- British Museum, London
- Yale Center for British Art, Yale University, New Haven, Connecticut
