= Petersfield, Jamaica =

Petersfield
- Hamlet
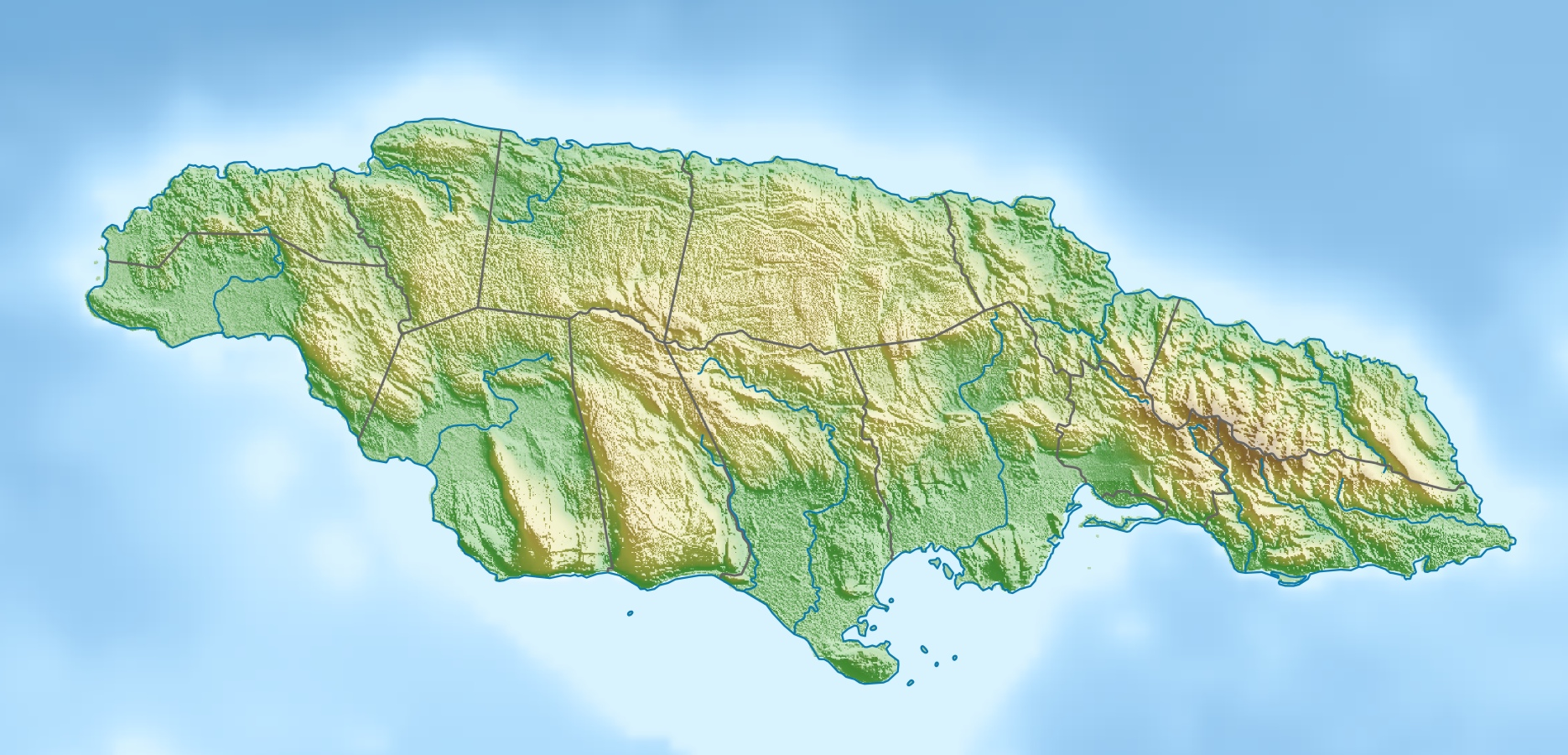
- Location within Jamaica
- Coordinates: 18°15′41″N 78°04′16″W
- Country: Jamaica
- Parish: Westmoreland
- Founded: 18th century
- Named for: Peter Beckford

Population
  - Estimate (2009): 2,252
- Time zone: UTC-05:00 (EST)

Petersfield is a small town in Westmoreland Parish, Jamaica. It shares its name with five other places in Jamaica.

== History ==
The town was founded in the 18th century and named after Peter Beckford, a slave owner who settled the Roaring River Estate. Petersfield was a dormitory community for workers on that estate.

To the south of the town's main junction lies the neighborhood locally called "Carawina" which was the original name given to the plantation which predated it. According to an estate record proved in 1723, the original owner of the land that would be called Carawina was Rowland Williams of Glamorgan west of present-day Cardiff. The name "Carawina" given to the estate highly suggests its founders were of Welsh origin. Carawina appears to be the Anglicization of the Welsh name "Carwyn" which is a combination of the Welsh word caru "to love" and gwyn "white, fair, blessed." By 1764, John Wedderburn of Ballendean was listed as an associated owner of the estate. This is the same Wedderburn who was a litigant in the Knight v. Wedderburn court case.

Today Petersfield is a one street town with a community health centre at one end and a cemetery at the other. It is the home of many of the workers at the Frome Sugar Estate as well as many other business people with interests in the nearby coastal cities of Savannah La Mar, Negril and even Montego Bay to the North.

The reggae artist Winston Hubert McIntosh was born in Petersfield, and later on, when he lived in Jamaica's capital Kingston, he changed his name to Peter McIntosh (Peter Tosh).
