= William Beckford of Somerley =

British planter and writer

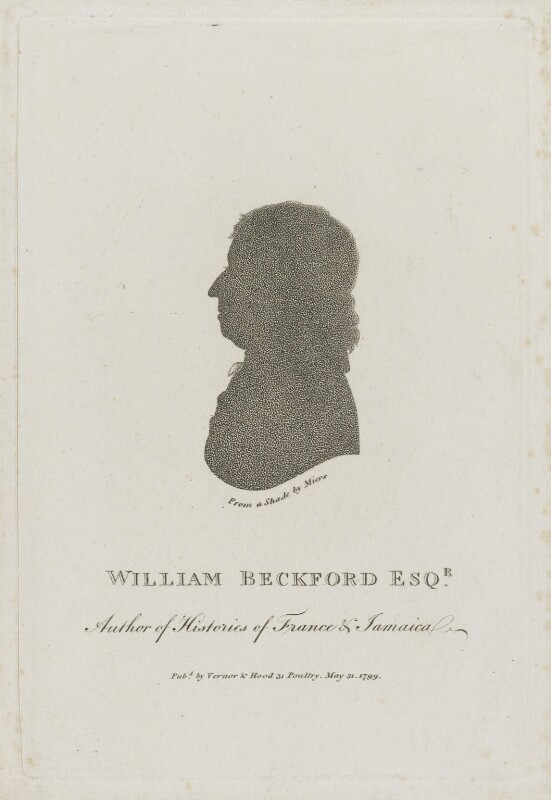
A silhouette portrait of Beckford

William Beckford of Somerley (13/24 September 1744 – 5 February 1799) was a British planter and writer who wrote on the topography and conditions of slavery in the British colony of Jamaica and the history of France.

Born into a very prominent and wealthy slave-holding family, he was educated in England, lost his father at the age of 10, and rounded off his gentleman's upbringing through Westminster School and Oxford University with a Grand Tour. He inherited his estates around Hertford in western Jamaica around 1765 at the age of 21. In a different mould from his colonial ancestors, he was considered a cultivated and personally sensitive man who, after he married and went to live in Jamaica in 1774 to supervise his affairs personally, became preoccupied with the welfare and conditions of the African and Creole workers in his estates, deplored their mistreatment and hardships and sought to deal with them more humanely.

However, he had too open and naive a nature to survive as a businessman, and, facing losses through natural catastrophes, and subjected to predatory actions by his creditors, found that his estates had become heavily involved in debt. Returning to England in 1787 to mend his affairs, he was thrown into debtors' prison, from where he wrote and published two books descriptive of Jamaica, of the industry of the estates and of the circumstances of the enslaved labourers. He advocated reform at every level, in transportation, domestic welfare, working conditions and management, and rights before the law, but not, finally, the dismantling of the system itself, arguing that this would lead to greater deprivations.

By the adjustment of his debts he lost his estates but retained £400 a year, and remaining in England he devoted his last years to writing both in prose and poetry. As a member of a highly privileged class, despite his personal misfortunes, his contribution to the History of France has to be understood in the light of the French Revolution and the fall of Robespierre, which occurred in the year of its publication.

== Early life ==
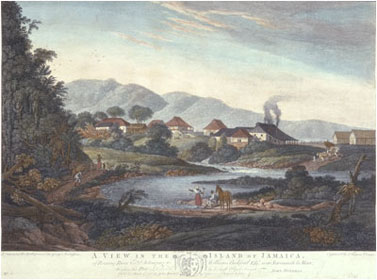
William Beckford's Roaring River Estate near Savanna-la-Mar, engraving (1778) after George Robertson

William Beckford of Somerley, Suffolk was the son of Richard Beckford (c. 1711–1756) and his friend Elizabeth Hay ("whom I have esteemed and do esteem in all respects as my wife"), and was born in Jamaica in 1744 into an influential slave-holding family of colonial Jamaica. His father Richard and uncles William Beckford (Lord Mayor of London in 1762 and 1769) and Julines Beckford were grandsons of Colonel Peter Beckford (1643–1710), Governor of Jamaica in 1702 (after whom Petersfield in Westmoreland Parish is named), and sons of Peter Beckford jnr. (1672–1735). Their sister Elizabeth was the Countess of Thomas Howard, 2nd Earl of Effingham. William of Somerley was the cousin of the ingenious novelist and scandalous art-collector William Thomas Beckford (1760–1844), son of William the Lord Mayor, and of Peter Beckford (1740–1811), son of Julines Beckford.

Richard (William's father) matriculated from Balliol College, Oxford in January 1727–28, but took his B.A. from University College in 1731. His estates in Hanover and Westmoreland Parish included the Hertford Penn, which he purchased from his brother Julines, the Roaring River Estate and Fort William Estate, both near Petersfield, and also the Shrewsbury Plantation, which he leased from Julines. Richard was M.P. for Bristol in 1754–1756 and Prime Warden of the Worshipful Company of Goldsmiths (of London) in 1755–56, serving as Alderman for the London ward of Farringdon Without in 1754–1756.

== Early life ==
William came to England at the age of 5 (at the time of his grandmother's death) and was educated at Westminster School and under the private tuition of the Revd. Dr. Thomas Wilson of Bungay, Suffolk. Dr Wilson, formerly a tutor of Balliol College, Oxford, was Vicar of Holy Trinity at Bungay for 40 years, 1733–1774. Beckford was only 10 or 11 when his father died in the French dominions. Among various legacies, at his death Richard left his Jamaican estates (including all his "Messuages, Lands, Pens, Tenements, Slaves and Hereditaments and all my real Estate") in trust under his executors for his reputed son William Beckford to inherit at his age of 21. The executors were meanwhile empowered to manage the estates, and, of these, Captain Thomas Collett (Chelsea merchant in the West India trade from 1723, West India merchant in London from 1747 to 1774, and agent for Alderman William Beckford) accepted sole administration at probate in 1756, though joined by Julines Beckford in 1758. William matriculated from Balliol College, Oxford in 1762, aged 17, and was created M.A. in April 1765. Uncle Julines Beckford died in 1764.

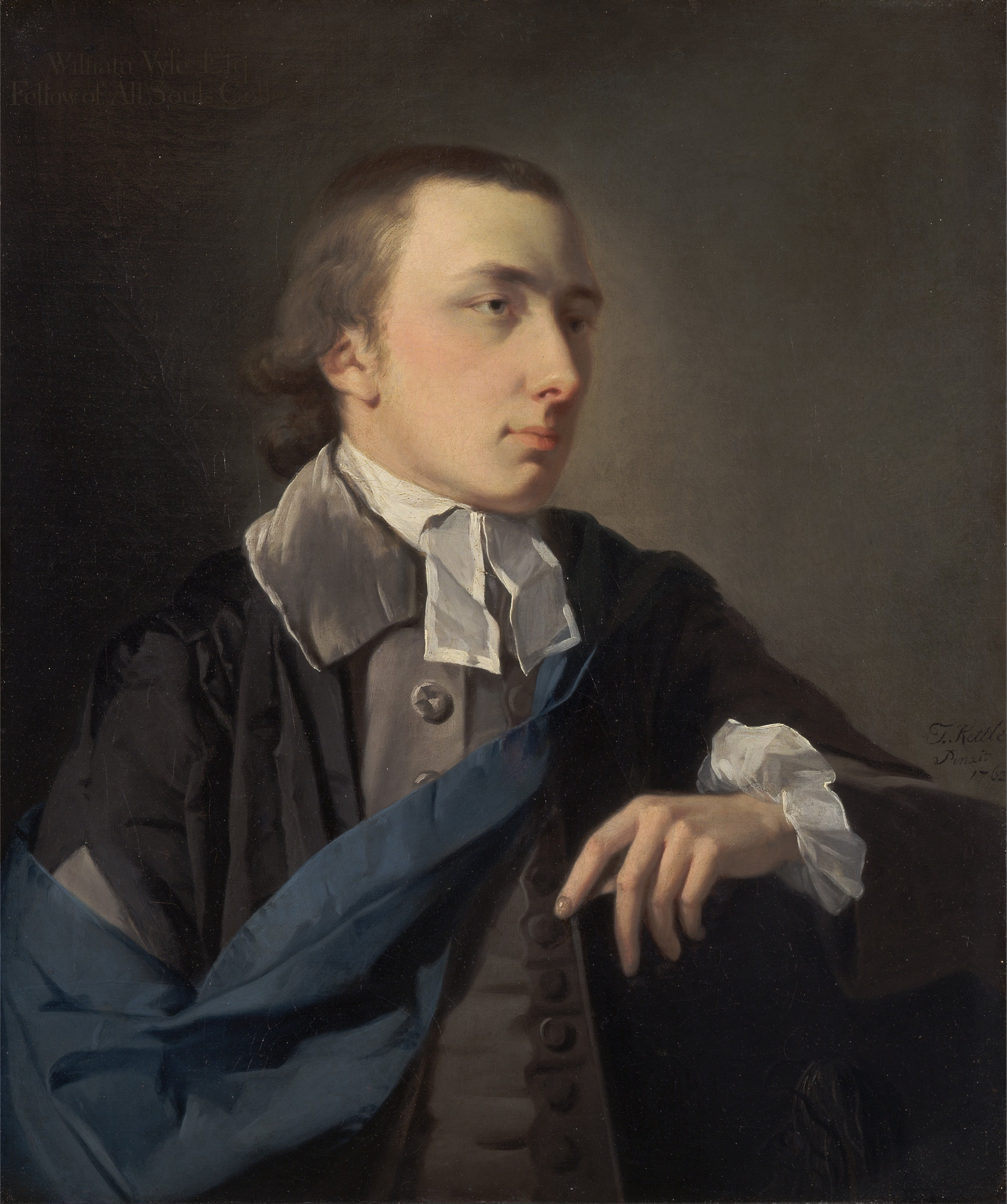
Beckford's friend Revd. William Vyse, painted by Tilly Kettle in 1762

William then made a "scientific excursion" in Europe in 1765–66, travelling in France, Switzerland and Italy with Patrick Brydone, and with the Revd. William Vyse. In 1770 Brydone made a Tour Through Sicily and Malta which he described in a two-volume work published in 1773 as a series of letters addressed to his friend William Beckford of Somerley. This went into many subsequent editions. In his introduction, Brydone writes that he has edited the original letters only slightly, to preserve their liveliness, and declares them to be "a monument of his friendship with the gentleman to whom they are addressed." Whether Beckford was actually one of the company is not quite clear, but he was in Rome in May 1770 with William Vyse ("an agreeable young gent") where, in September, they travelled about with Dr Charles Burney, who was there to collect information for his General History of Music. It was at this time that William Beckford met Leopold Mozart, who mentioned the fact in a letter to his wife. (In 1766 William's cousin Peter Beckford, as patron, had adopted the child Muzio Clementi and taken him to England, and the young Wolfgang Amadeus Mozart had given a few lessons to William's cousin William, then of Fonthill Splendens.)

Although William became possessed of his inheritance of four sugarcane plantations in 1765–66, he at first took a long lease on Somerley Hall (a forerunner of the present Somerleyton Hall) in north Suffolk and remained in England, or pursued his travels in Europe. He was not acknowledged in the will of his uncle Alderman William Beckford in 1770, who had many of his own informally-conceived children to provide for. On 13 April 1773 Beckford married his first cousin, Miss (Charlotte) Hay, a minor (aged 16), one of the daughters of Thomas Hay Esq, a former Secretary of Jamaica, who had died in 1769. Both were described as of St Mary le Bow: the wedding was conducted by William Vyse (the younger) by special licence in the chapel of Lambeth Palace, with the consent of George Ramsay and others, her lawful guardians.

== To Jamaica ==
William and Charlotte Beckford had settled at Somerley, in the time of the brothers Sir Thomas and the Revd Sir Ashurst Anguish, alias Allin, whose family seat this was, and where his presence is noted in 1773 by Norton Nicholls, friend of the poet Gray, at nearby Blundeston. Beckford received an invitation from the deputy-mayor of Great Yarmouth in 1774 to stand, with Admiral Sir Charles Saunders of Gunton Hall, as candidates for parliament more strongly in favour of the repeal of the Test Act and Corporation Act than were Sir Edward Walpole and Charles Townsend, the "safer" Whig candidates, but the contest was not successful. It appears that Beckford stood against Townshend again with the support of the town's Dissenting interest, also without success, in June 1777.

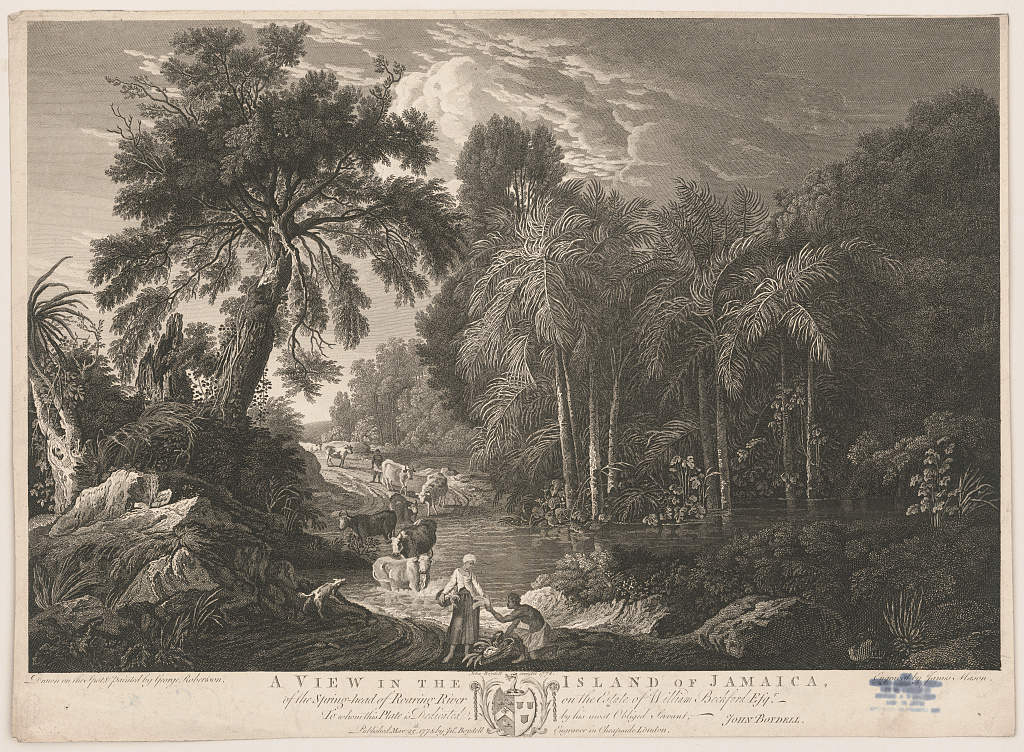
Headwater of the Roaring River, engraving (1777) after George Robertson

In 1774 William and Mrs Beckford sailed for Jamaica to inspect his estates and to supervise them in person. They made their home on the Hertford estate near Savanna-la-Mar. They were accompanied by the artist George Robertson, with whom he had travelled in Italy, and whose career he had encouraged in London. Robertson produced what have been described as "the most aesthetically ambitious views of Jamaica published in the eighteenth century." They also took with them the artist Philip Wickstead, who had studied with Johan Zoffany in Italy from 1768 to 1773, and remained in Jamaica until the Beckfords returned to England in 1786–87. Beckford describes a fine group portrait of a holeing gang which Wickstead produced, which was destroyed in the hurricane of 1780.

Robert Charles Dallas, as a visitor to Beckford at Hertford, gave this description of him:

"A West Indian, a man of taste and learning... A classical education, and a course of well-directed travelling, conspired to accomplish the mind of Benevolus: and while that was liberally stored with the beauties of science and of art, and with every delicate refinement, Nature pressed upon his heart all the noble feelings of philanthropy. A princely fortune enabled him to indulge his taste in the patronage of merit, and to enjoy the luxury of doing good. In the bosom of his family, he enjoys true and domestic happiness. As a man of the world, he is accomplished, mild, and pleasing; as a friend, sincere; as a husband, delicate and affectionate; as a brother, warmly attached; as a master, tender and humane; as a man of business, alas! misled by the goodness of his own heart and the villany of others."

Having borrowed heavily to support his estate, the hurricane of October 1780 was devastating for Beckford himself, as it was for the communities dependent upon his estates, and for the town of Savanna-la-Mar which was swept away by an inundation. After 13 years in Jamaica (1774–1787), through poor business advice, through the corrupt behaviour of merchants who exploited his trust, and by his unstinted generosity, William eventually lost his holdings and returned to England as a debtor, intending to rebuild his fortune and reputation. Declining a suggestion that he should return to England via France, he took a post-chaise from the coast for London. On the way he was met under pretence of friendship by a man whom he had supported, and who now gave him directly into the hands of the bailiffs, so that he was taken at once to the debtors' prison.

== Later life and writings ==
Pictures, marbles and other objects belonging to Beckford of Somerley were sold at Christie's on 23 January 1789. Beckford remained in the Fleet Prison (the debtors' prison in London) for three years, and resolved to make good use of his time there by writing on the subjects of which he had immediate knowledge.

The first of his prison books, Remarks upon the Situation of Negroes in Jamaica, was effectively a long essay dictated in February 1788 and prepared for the press in June of that year. The book was based on his own observation of the conditions and behaviour of the people described, and was at first intended for private circulation. The terms in which he speaks of the enslaved peoples and their character belongs to the age in which that system was deeply entrenched, but in which the movement for emancipation was gathering momentum. He appealed to the vital importance of maintaining civilized, humane standards of management, health, social organization and justice for those populations. However, he approved the continuance of the system itself, for although he considered it repugnant, he argued that greater suffering and degradation would result from abandoning or attempting to dismantle it. The essay includes a brief letter of dedication to (Sir) William Parsons, Master of the King's Musick, who had given Beckford unsolicited assistance.

The theme of this book was greatly enlarged and developed in A Descriptive Account of the Island of Jamaica, published in 1790, also written from the Fleet. A two-volume work, it contained a description of contemporary life in Jamaica from a planter's point of view. The subtitles are explanatory: Remarks upon the cultivation of the sugar-cane, throughout the different seasons of the year, and chiefly considered in a picturesque point of view: Also, Observations and Reflections upon what would probably be the consequences of an abolition of the slave-trade, and of the emancipation of the slaves. This he dedicated, with permission, to the Duke of Dorset, acknowledging "that friendship which was the delight of my early days, the pride of my advancing years, and which has been a comfort to me in my present hours of mortification", dating this and his introduction from the Fleet in February 1790. This work contains many biographical details of Beckford's life in Jamaica.

In volume II of this work Beckford made the following observation:

"It is customary with the liberal creditor to suffer the indebted planter to reside upon his mortgaged premises, to superintend the white people, and to direct the cultivation of the land; to dispose of his rum to discharge the contingencies of the country, to recommend captains of ships to convey his stores to the island, and to have the preference of freight to England, and to be indulged with such articles and conveniences as the plantation affords; to have the liberty to reside upon it, and likewise to share the same emoluments that an attorney would have; and under such a compact, a planter may not have much to apprehend, nor the merchant much to fear, as confidence is the best connective band of interest; whereas dissension and distrust, while they sour the mind, will ultimately conduct to ruin. To be, on the other hand, forbidden the least interference whatever with his concerns, to be proceeded against to the utmost remnant of his means, to be deprived of common subsistence; and, to encrease his mortification, to behold all at once a man become his master, who but a few years before was contented to be his servant; all these are bitter circumstances which the planter too often suffers, and which it is certainly heart-breaking to endure."

In this work (which contains many digressions), Beckford refers to his friendship with the musician and historian of music Dr Charles Burney. In October 1791 Dr Burney wrote that his son-in-law Charles Rousseau Burney (1747–1819), a very accomplished harpsichordist and violinist, was in the habit of visiting Beckford in the Fleet once a week to dine with him, and to play to him "on a miserable pianoforte for five or six hours at a time." Dr. Burney wrote to his daughter (Fanny), "I have been lately reading my much beloved and unfortunate friend Mr Beckford's account of Jamaica. My heart bleeds for him at every page. I always loved him as a man of most excellent taste and goodness of heart – but I now respect him doubly for his genius and misfortunes." "I intend to try to get Sir Joshua [Reynolds] and Sir Joseph Banks, his old acquaintances, to visit him there with me." He was released in 1792 in a state of crushed dejection.

In 1794, in which year the Reign of Terror came to its climax in Paris with the fall of Robespierre, Beckford's historical work, A History of France, from the Most Early Records to the Death of Louis XVI was published in London in four volumes. The title-page advertizes that the "ancient" part was written by William Beckford (this, also, was written in the Fleet), and the "modern" part by an English gentleman resident in Paris. To judge from the shift in written style, Beckford's work continues down to the end of Chapter XXXIII in volume 3 (page 160), anno 1442, and in the next chapter the narrative is resumed (without any remark) by the second author, whose style is slightly less rhetorical. Beckford's travels in France had been mentioned in Brydone's first Letter, and the first volume of Beckford's History opens with an engraved Letter of Dedication to William Vyse, with a vignette of Lambeth Palace, stating "I have always acknowledged your confidence and friendship to be the pride and comfort of my Life."

By giving up his estates in trust to adjust his debt, Beckford was able to keep £400 a year, and devoted himself to literary pursuits.

== Death and an appreciation ==
The editor of the Monthly Mirror in 1799, evidently writing from personal knowledge, referred to various literary contributions by Beckford of Somerley, some already published and others transmitted to him by the author which the magazine proposed to insert from time to time. Beckford was improving both in health and fortune when he died quite suddenly of an apoplectic fit on the night of 5 February 1799 while visiting the Earl of Effingham in Wimpole Street from his own residence in Han's Place, Pimlico. His encomium proceeds,

"he possessed a quickness of poetic genius, a celerity and precision of thought, and a comprehension of mind, which excited the admiration of all who knew him. There was no subject, be it ever so abstruse, which that did not in an instant strike upon his understanding with its full elucidation. As a botanist, he was complete without having ever appeared to study a single plant. His eye in painting was correct in the most minute degree, as was his ear in music, and his taste in architecture; and all without any obvious cultivation; for every useful and ornamental acquisition appeared in him to spring solely from intuition, while he was universally allowed to rank among the best classical scholars of the age... In mixed companies, an unconquerable diffidence rendered him in general silent; but with a few select friends, his mind expanded, his countenance brightened, and he gave scope to conversation interesting, instructive and energetic... a heart for ever open, for ever alive to the misfortunes of others, and in those misfortunes entirely forgetting its own."

Charlotte Beckford long survived her husband, and died at Bath, Somerset on 24 May 1833 aged 75. She was buried at Batheaston, where she shares a churchyard tomb monument with her sisters Elizabeth (1823) and Sarah (1841). Her brother John Baker Hay, Esq., R.N., Captain of HMS Queen Charlotte, died at Portsmouth, Hampshire (UK) in 1823. A silhouette of William Beckford of Somerley, after a "shade" by John Miers, was reproduced as an engraving in 1799.
