= Thomas Beckford =

English merchant, Tory politician (1618 – 1685)

- Born: 1618
- Died: 1685 (aged 66–67)
- Occupation: merchant

Major Sir Thomas Beckford (1618 – 1685) was an English merchant, Tory politician and military officer who served as the sheriff of London in 1678. Born in 1618, he was the son of Peter Beckford of Maidenhead and was baptised in St Katherine Coleman, London. Beckford, the uncle of future Jamaican planter Peter Beckford, married the sister of Sir William Thomas, 1st Baronet. Following the 1660 Stuart Restoration, he became a prominent Tory politician in the City of London. In 1672, Beckford was granted £5,000 by the Royal Navy in payment for cloth he supplied to them. Beckford was knighted in October 1677 at the Guildhall, London. He was accused of malpractice by Sir Francis North. He died in 1685 and was buried at St Mary-at-Hill on 27 August.
