= Home House =

Grade I listed building in City of Westminster, United Kingdom

Coordinates: 51.5162°N 0.1567°W

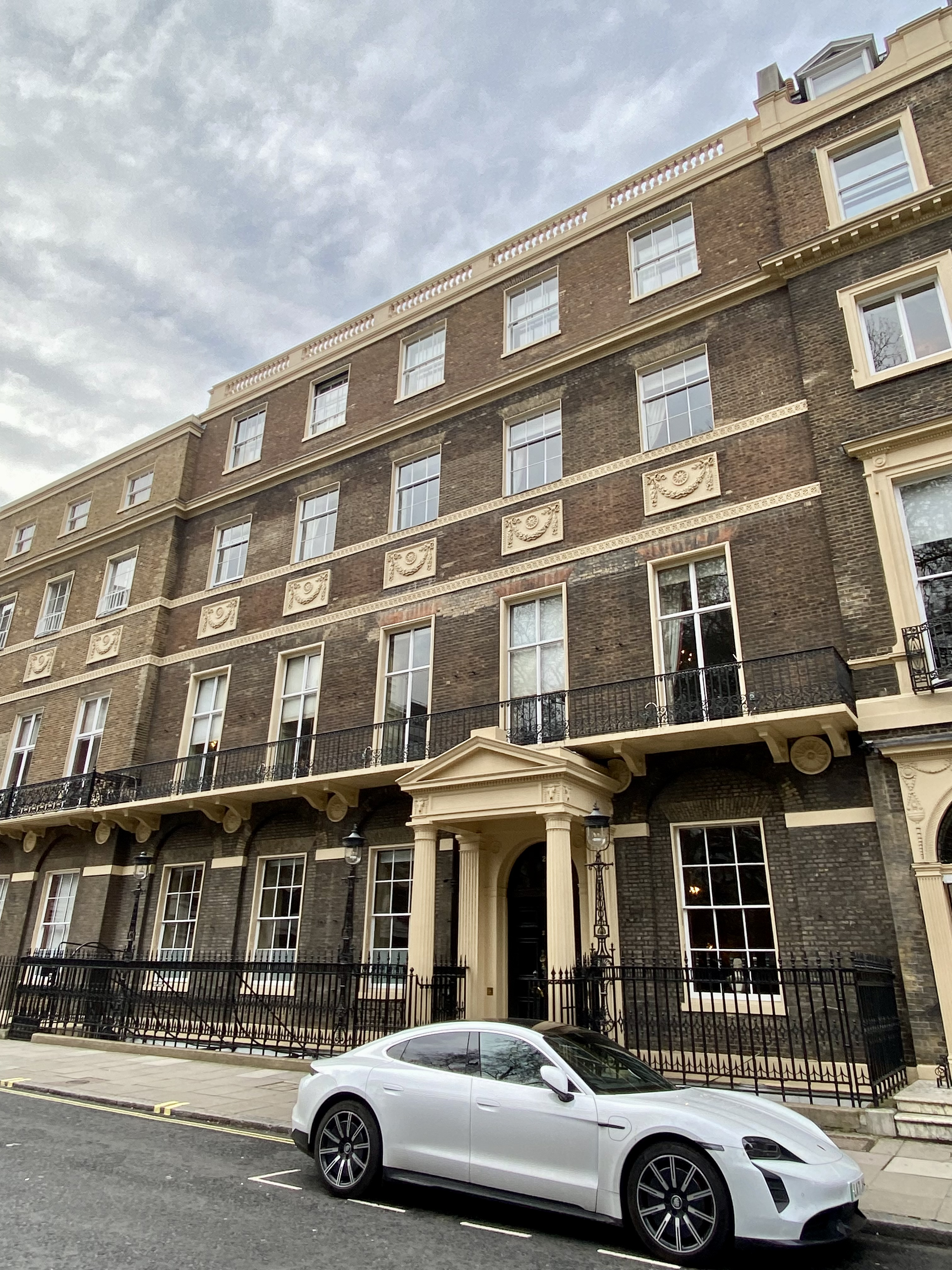
- Home House at 20 Portman Square in March 2023
- Formation: 1998
- Type: Private members' club
- Location: 20 Portman Square, Marylebone, London England
- Website: www.homehouse.co.uk

Home House is a private members' club in a Georgian town house at 20 Portman Square, Marylebone, London.

== 1776 to 1989: History of Home House ==
George III's architect, James Wyatt was appointed to design Home House at 20 Portman Square by Elizabeth, Countess of Home in 1776, but by 1777 he had been dismissed and replaced by Robert Adam. Elizabeth left the completed house on her death in 1784 to her nephew William Gale, who in turn left it to one of his aunts, Mrs Walsh, in 1785.Home House has been a private members' club

Its later occupants included the Marquis de la Luzerne during his time as French ambassador to the Court of St James's (1788 to 1791), the 4th Duke of Atholl (1798 to 1808), the 4th Duke of Newcastle (1820 to 1861), Sir Francis Henry Goldsmid (1862 to 1919), and Lord and Lady Islington (1919 to 1926).

Cold War spy Anthony Blunt held meetings in the building with fellow members of the Cambridge Five.

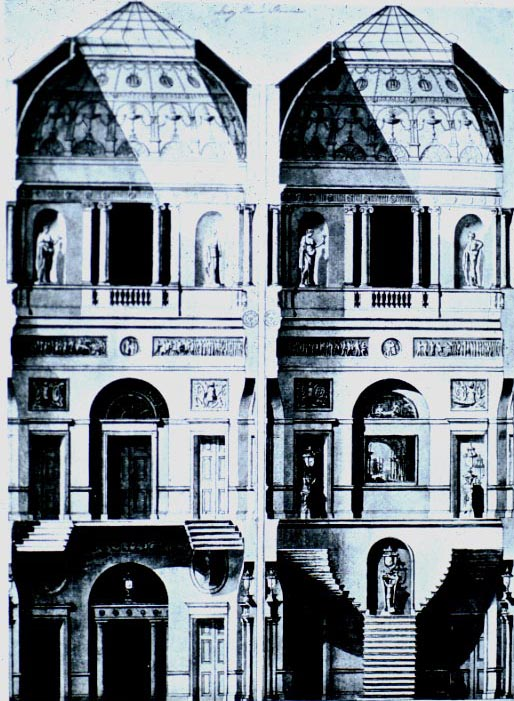
Home House, design by Robert Adam for the main staircase

In 1926, it was leased by Samuel Courtauld to house his growing art collection. On his wife's death in 1931, he gave the house and the collection to the fledgling Courtauld Institute of Art (which he had played a major part in founding) as temporary accommodation. A permanent accommodation was not forthcoming, and the Institute remained in the building until 1989, when it moved to its present home of Somerset House. Home House then remained vacant for seven years, until it was acquired by Berkeley Adam Ltd.

Home House was appointed a Grade I listed building in 1954.

== 1998 to present: A private members' club ==
The building at 20 Portman Square has been a private members' club since 1998.

The club features twenty three bedrooms, two restaurants, five bars, cigar lounge, a basement nightclub, and a courtyard garden, along with a gymnasium and health spa.

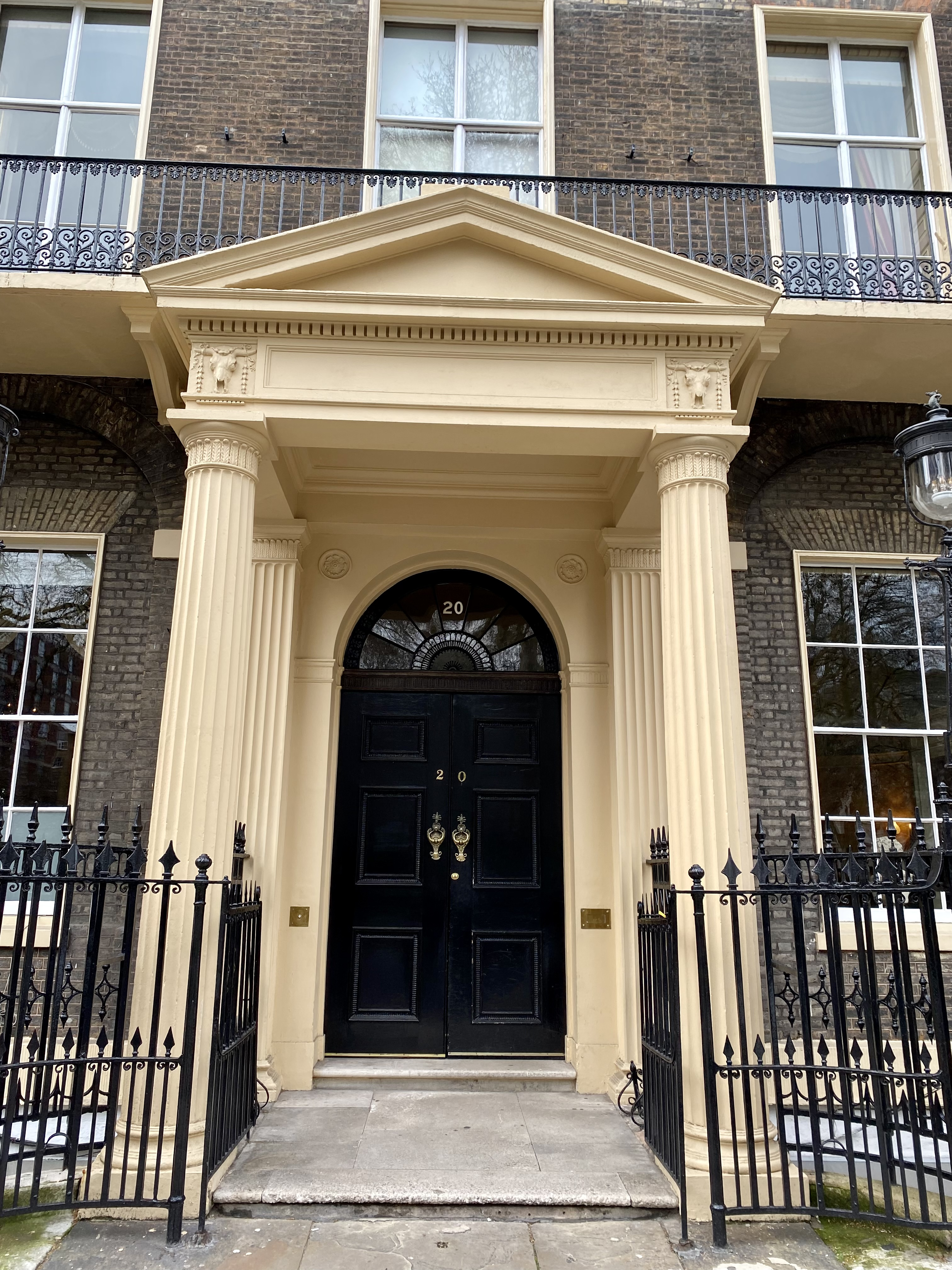
Entrance of Home House in March 2023

Home House now spans three interconnected Georgian townhouses. It was extended to include No. 21, as well as the original Nos. 19 and 20, in 2010.

It was home to artwork by Zaha Hadid in the form of a Cocktail Bar prior to its refurbishment in 2020.

House 21 takes inspiration from the notorious Countess of Home's outrageously lavish and wildly hedonistic parties, where she gained the moniker "Queen of Hell'. The club is famously known as a "Shrine to Hedonism" and a "Shrines of Vice".

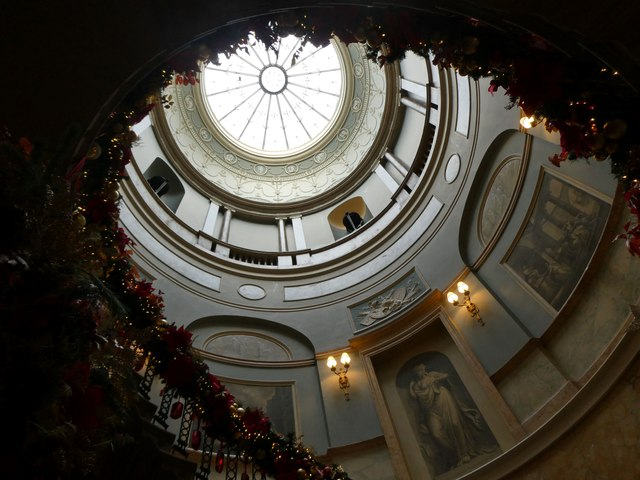
The interior of Home House in November 2025

In 2026, Home House featured on the Spear's 500 private members' club ranking along with other notable clubs including; 5 Hertford Street, Annabel's, Mark's Club, Oswald's, Tramp, and George.

During Spear's visit to the club for the review, the mantra was: 'there are no rules'. Spear's also mentioned in the review that 'by night a haven for the hedonistic', and that the club 'checks all the boxes for London's young, wealthy and wild".

Notable guests at Home House include; Princess Beatrice, Princess Eugenie, Sir Paul McCartney, Madonna, George Clooney, David Hasselhoff, Bono, and Annie Lennox

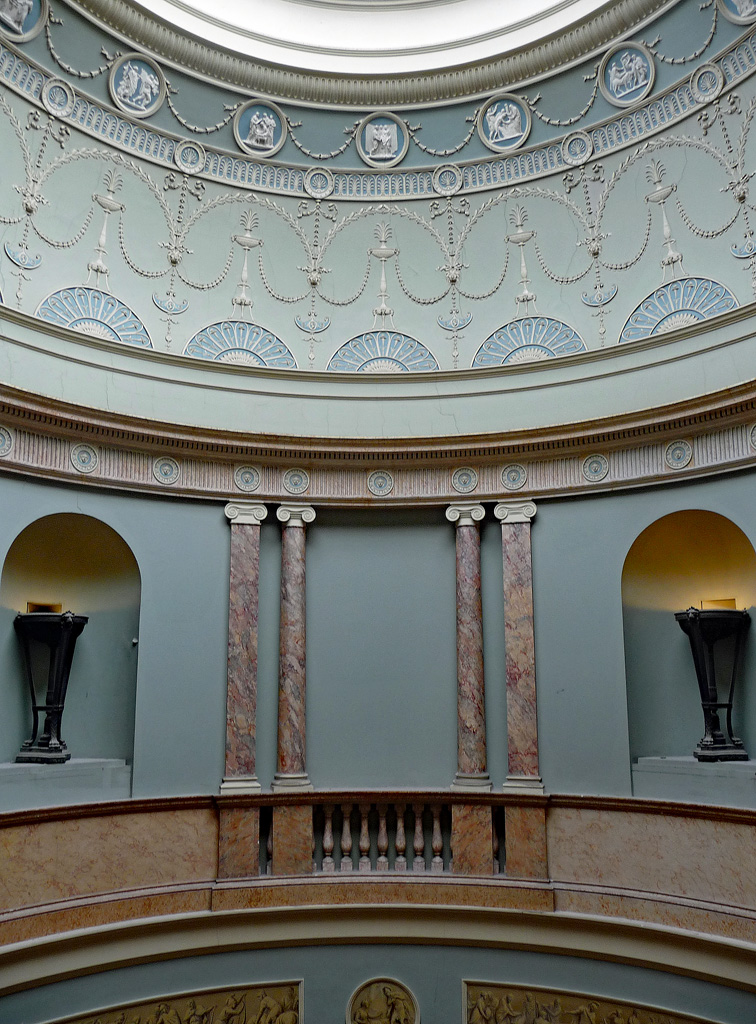
Detailed interior of Home House in 2018

== Gallery ==
Images of Home House Club, London

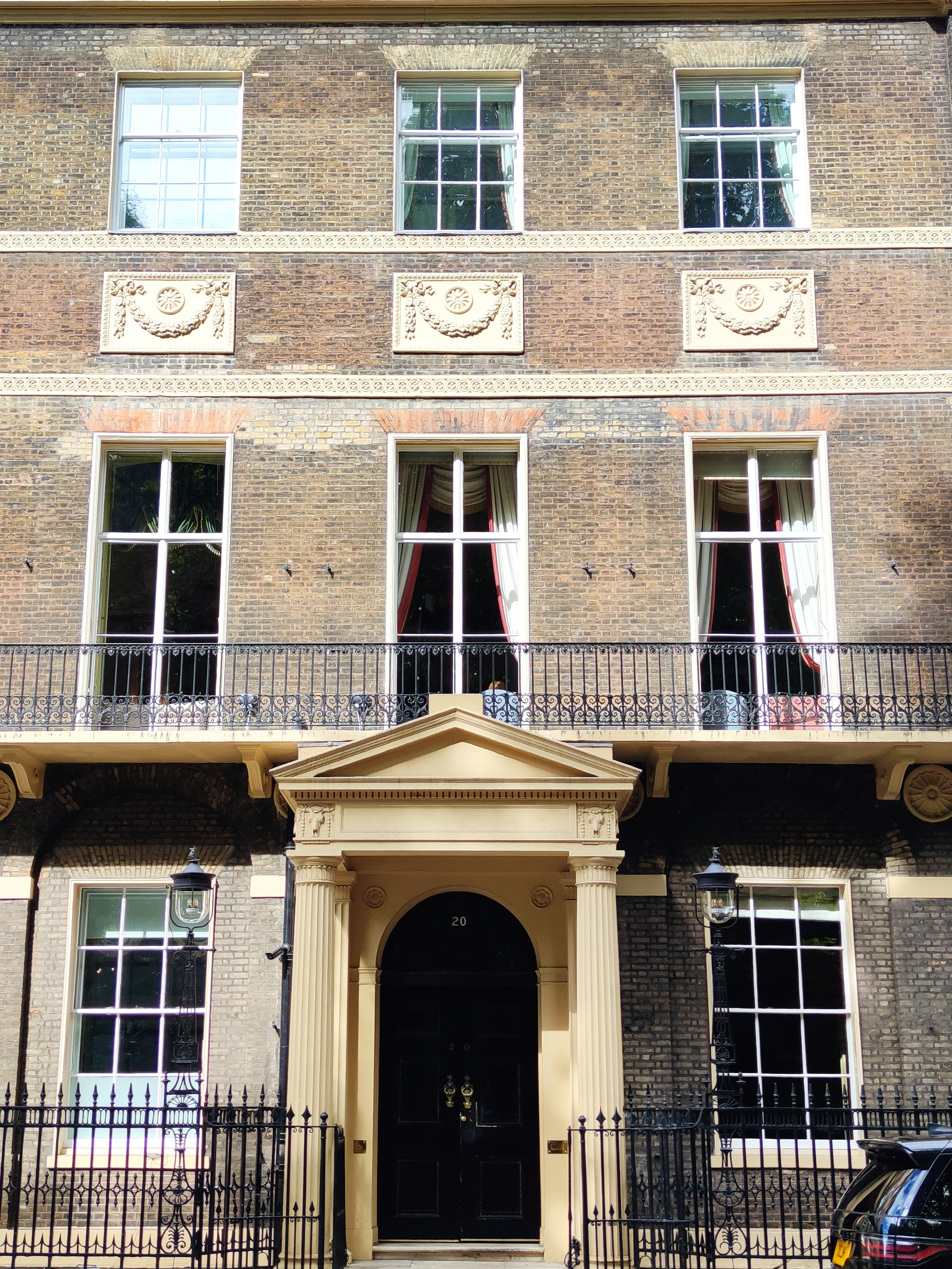
Entrance of Home House in 2025

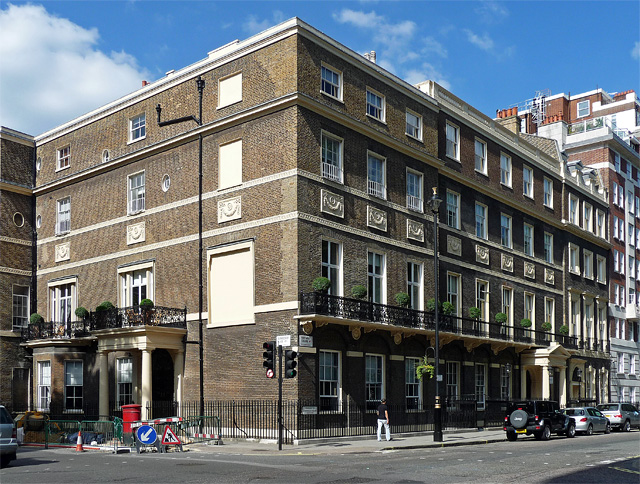
20-21 Portman Square

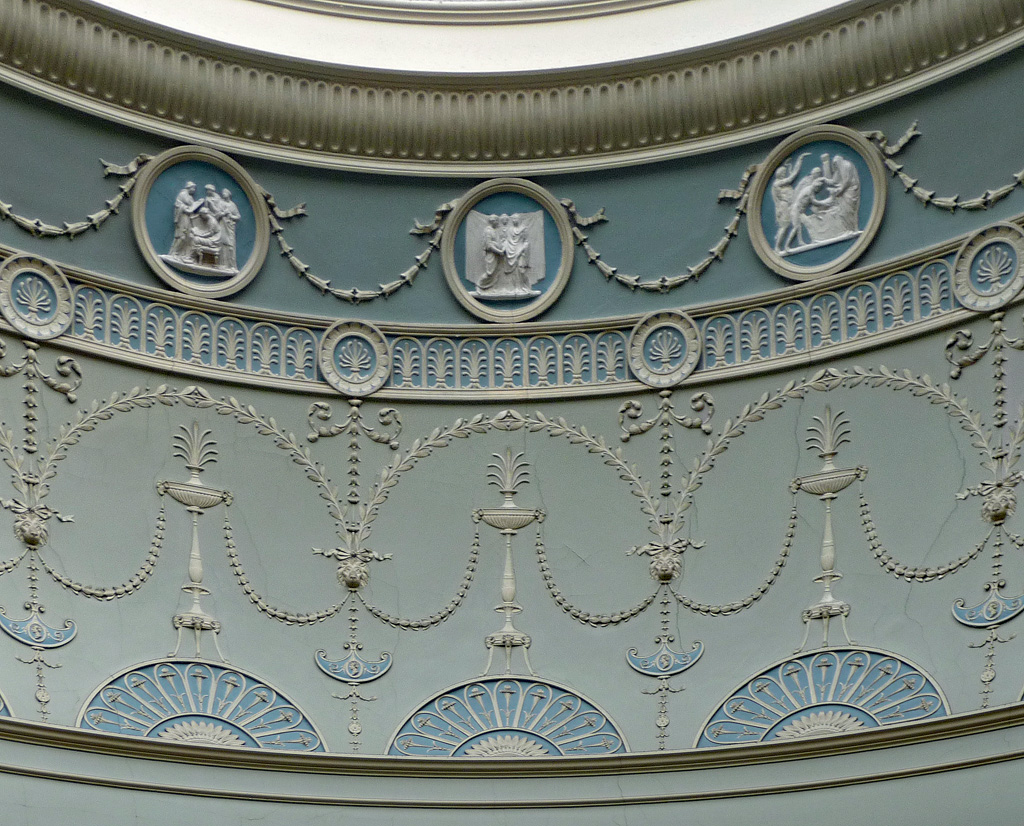
Interior detail in 2018

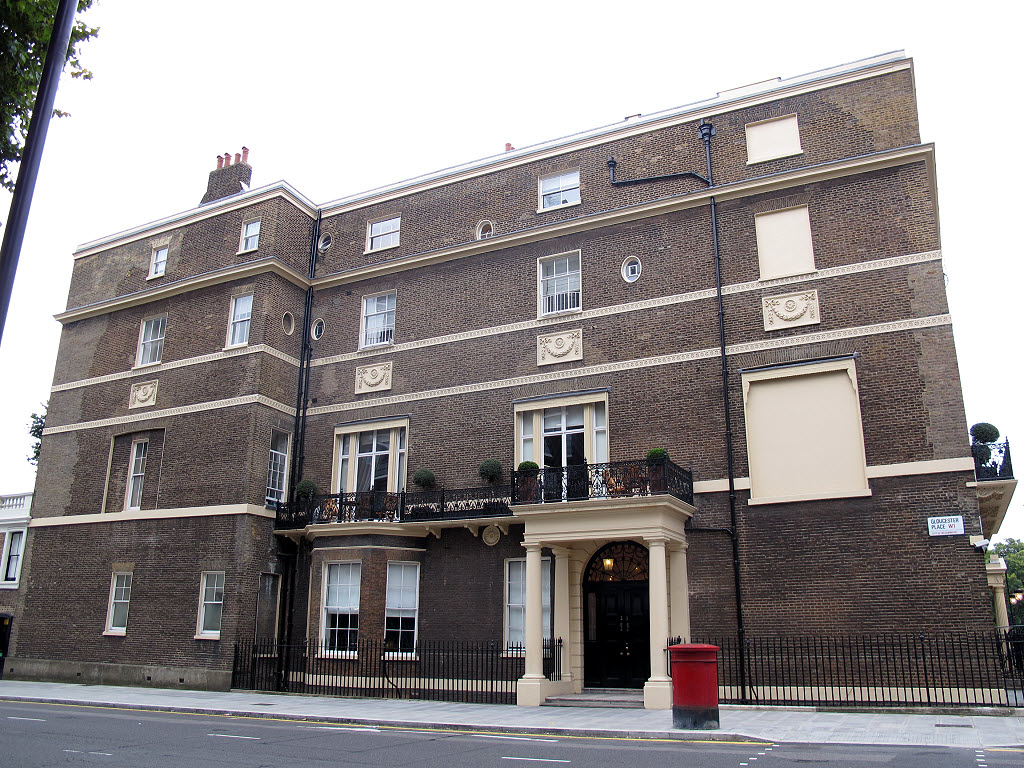
West entrance

== Bibliography ==
- Stourton, James (2012). Great Houses of London. London: Frances Lincoln. ISBN 978-0-7112-3366-9.
- Thévoz, Seth Alexander (2025). London Clubland: A Companion for the Curious. London: Robinson/Little, Brown. ISBN 978-1472149985.
