= Peter Beckford (colonial administrator) =

English-born planter, merchant, militia officer and colonial administrator

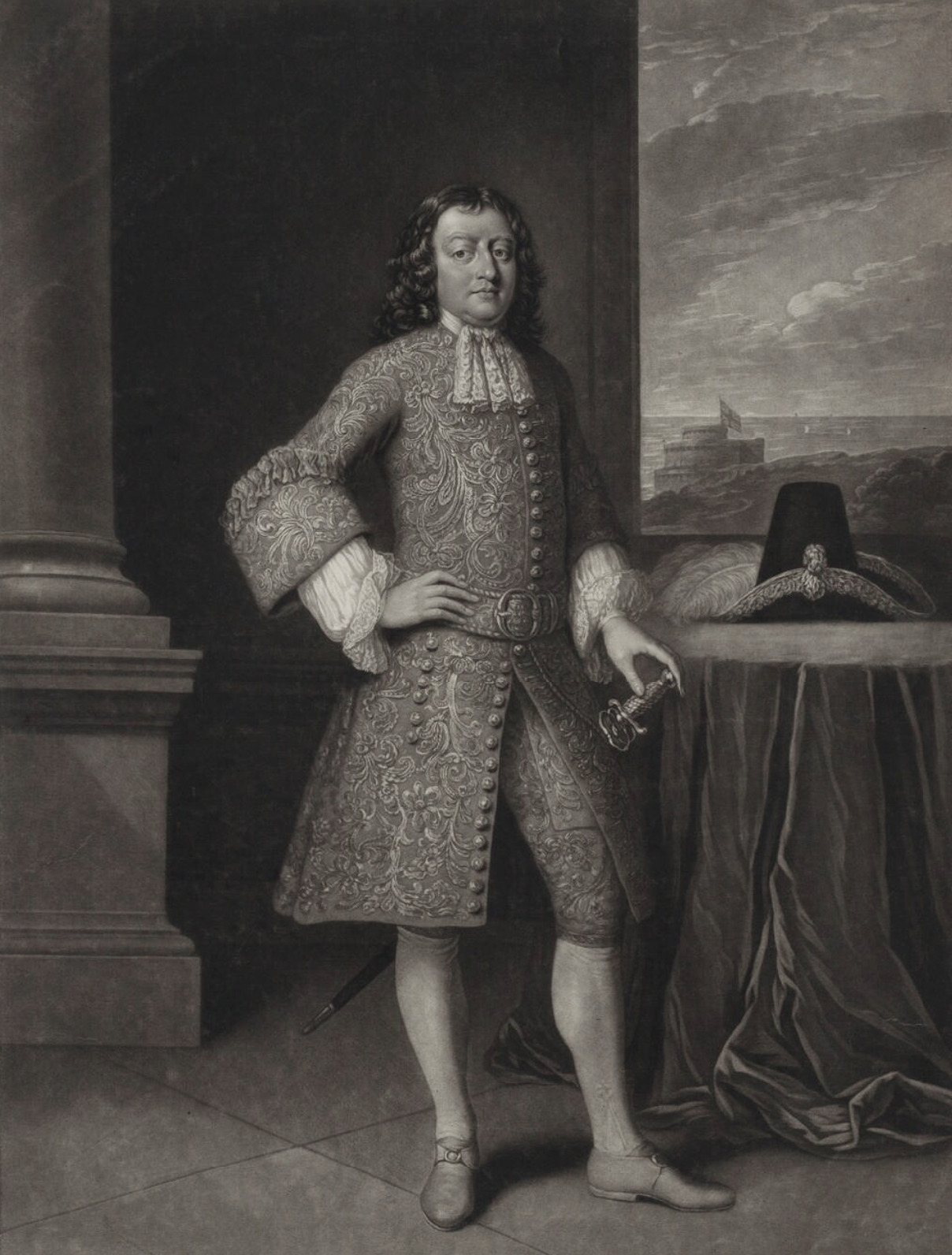
c. 1780 mezzotint of Beckford

Colonel Peter Beckford (c. 1643 – 3 April 1710) was an English-born planter, merchant, militia officer and colonial administrator who served as the acting lieutenant-governor of Jamaica in 1702. A prominent member of the planter class in the English colony of Jamaica, by the time of his death Beckford had acquired ownership over 20 plantations, 1,200 slaves and earnt what historian Noel Deer described as "perhaps the greatest fortune ever made in planting."

== Early life ==
Peter Beckford was born in London c. 1643. His father was also named Peter Beckford and was from Maidenhead; one of Beckford's uncles was Sir Thomas Beckford, who served as the sheriff of London, while another was Richard Beckford, a sea captain who was engaged in trade with the English colony of Jamaica from 1659 onwards.

== Planter and slave owner ==
After the Commonwealth of England launched a successful invasion of Jamaica in 1655, the colony proved a lucrative business proposition for English colonists who wished to establish sugar plantations there. In 1662, Beckford emigrated to the island, taking with him two or three Black slaves, and engaged himself as hunter and horse catcher. Having served as a seaman, he was granted a thousand acres (4 km^{2}) of land in Clarendon by royal patent on 6 March 1669.

He took an active part in island politics, representing Saint Catherine Parish in the House of Assembly of Jamaica in 1675, and was later called to the colonial council, where he was appointed President. He was appointed Chief Justice of Jamaica in 1703. He was the first Custos of Kingston, and a street was named after him there. He was renowned for being haughty with a strong temper and was involved in many heated debates.

== Family and legacy ==
Beckford was twice married—first to Bridget, who died in 1691, and then again to Anne Ballard in 1696—and had two sons, the eldest of whom was also called Peter.

When he died from a stroke on 3 April 1710, he was the wealthiest planter in Jamaica. Charles Leslie claimed Beckford was "in possession of the largest property real and personal of any subject in Europe." This wealth was reputedly in the form of 20 Jamaican estates, 1500 slaves, and £1,500,000 in bank stock. His death resulted from an accident on 3 April 1710 when he rushed to the defence of his son, who had caused a commotion when the governor, Thomas Handasyd, tried to dissolve the House of Assembly. Swords were drawn, and the elder Beckford allegedly fell down the stairs and died of a stroke.

Peter junior gave him a grandson, William Beckford, generally known as "Alderman Beckford" and twice Lord Mayor of London. He in turn produced the great grandson, William Thomas Beckford, the writer and art collector. The latter had his great grandfather's portrait on display, according to Henry Venn Lansdown:

"That is the portrait of my great-grandfather, Colonel Peter Beckford. It was painted by a French artist, who went to Jamaica for the purpose, at the time he was Governor of the island. It is a full length portrait, large as life, the Colonel dressed in a scarlet coat embroidered richly with gold."

Petersfield in Westmoreland Parish, Jamaica is named after him.

== Notes ==
Government offices
Preceded by William Selwyn	Lieutenant-governor of Jamaica (acting); 1702	Succeeded by Thomas Handasyd, acting
