= Viscount Lanesborough =

Peerage title in Ireland

Viscount Lanesborough is a title that has been created twice in the Peerage of Ireland. The first creation came on 31 July 1676 in favour Sir George Lane, 2nd Baronet. The titles became extinct upon the death of his son, the second Viscount, on 2 August 1724. The Lane Baronetcy, of Tulske in the County of Roscommon, had been created in the Baronetage of Ireland on 9 February 1661 for Richard Lane. The second creation came on 12 August 1728 in favour of Brinsley Butler, 2nd Baron Newtown-Butler. His son Humphrey was created Earl of Lanesborough in 1756. See the latter title for more information on this creation.

The Honourable Frances Lane, daughter of the first Viscount of the first creation, married as her second husband Henry Fox. Their son George Fox-Lane, 1st Baron Bingley assumed the additional surname of Lane and was created Baron Bingley in 1762.

== Lane Baronets, of Tulske (1661) ==
- Sir Richard Lane, 1st Baronet (died 1668)
- Sir George Lane, 2nd Baronet (c. 1620–1683) (created Viscount Lanesborough in 1676)

== Viscount Lanesborough (1676; First creation) ==
- George Lane, 1st Viscount Lanesborough (c. 1620–1683)
- James Lane, 2nd Viscount Lanesborough (1650–1724)

Darcy–Lane–Fox–Pitt–Rivers family tree

Baron Darcy of Chiche, 1551
Thomas Darcy; 1506–1558; 1st Baron Darcy of Chiche
John Darcy c. 1532–1580/1581; 2nd Baron Darcy of Chiche
Viscount Colchester, 1621; Earl Rivers (2nd creation), 1626
Thomas Darcy; 1565–1640; 1st Earl Rivers, etc. 3rd Baron Darcy of Chiche
Earl Rivers (3rd creation) and Viscount Colchester, 1641 (for life) | Viscount Savage and Baron Darcy of Chiche, 1613
Elizabeth Savage; 1581–1650; Countess Savage, etc. | Thomas Savage d. 1635; 1st Viscount Savage, etc.
Earldom Rivers (3rd creation) extinct, 1641
John Savage; 1603–1654; 2nd Earl Rivers, etc. 2nd Viscount Savage, etc.
Richard Lane d. 1668; 1st Baronet | George Pitt d. 1694 | Jane Savage d. 1676 | Thomas Savage; 1628–1694; 3rd Earl Rivers; 3rd Viscount Savage, etc. | Richard Savage
Viscount Lanesborough (1st creation), 1676
George Lane c. 1620–1683; 1st Viscount Lanesborough | George Pitt d. 1735 | Richard Savage d. 1712; 4th Earl Rivers; 4th Viscount Savage, etc. | John Savage; 1665–1737; 5th Earl Rivers; 5th Viscount Savage, etc.
Baron Bingley (1st creation), 1713 | Earldom Rivers (2nd creation) and Viscount Savage and subsidiary titles extinct, 1737
Robert Benson c. 1676–1731; Baron Bingley | James Lane; 1650–1724; 2nd Viscount Lanesborough | Frances Lane d. 1674 | Henry Fox; 1650-1719 | George Pitt d. 1745
Barony Bingley (1st creation) extinct, 1731 | Viscountcy Lanesborough (1st creation) extinct, 1724
Baron Bingley (2nd creation), 1763 | Baron Rivers (3rd creation), 1776; Baron Rivers (4th creation), 11802
Harriet Benson d. 1771 | George Fox-Lane c. 1697–1773; 1st Baron Bingley | Sackville Fox d. 1760 | George Pitt; 1721–1803; 1st Baron Rivers
Robert Lane; 1732–1768; 2nd Baron Bingley | James Fox-Lane; 1756–1821 | Marcia Lucy Pitt; 1756–1822 | George Pitt; 1751–1828; 2nd Baron Rivers | Louisa Pitt d. 1791 | Peter Beckford; 1740–1811
Barony Bingley (2nd creation) extinct, 1768 | Barony Rivers (3rd creation) extinct but 4th creation continued, 1828
George Lane-Fox; 1793–1848 | William Augustus Pitt Lane-Fox; 1796–1832 | Sackville Lane-Fox; 1797–1874 | William Horace Pitt-Rivers; 1777–1831; 3rd Baron Rivers
George Lane-Fox; 1816–1896 | Augustus Pitt Rivers; 1827–1900 | Sackville Lane-Fox; 1827–1888; 12th Baron Conyers | George Pitt-Rivers; 1810–1866; 4th Baron Rivers | Horace Pitt-Rivers; 1814–1880; 6th Baron Rivers
Barony Rivers (4th creation) extinct, 1880
James Thomas Richard Lane-Fox; 1841–1906 | Alexander Edward Lane Fox-Pitt-Rivers; 1855–1927 | St George Lane Fox-Pitt; 1856–1932 | William Augustus Lane Fox-Pitt b. 1858 | Douglas Fox-Pitt; 1864–1922 | Marcia Pelham; 1863–1926; 13th Baroness Conyers, Baroness Fauconberg | Violet Herbert; 1865–1929; Baroness Darcy de Knayth | Henry Peter Pitt-Rivers; 1849–1867; 5th Baron Rivers
Baron Bingley (3rd creation), 1933
George Lane-Fox; 1870–1947; 1st Baron Bingley | Edward Lane-Fox; 1874–1949 | Emily Rachel Forster d. 1979 | George Pitt-Rivers; 1890–1966 | Rosalind Pitt-Rivers; 1907–1990 | William Augustus Fitzgerald Lane Fox-Pitt; 1896–1988
Barony Bingley (3rd creation) extinct, 1947
Baroness Lane-Fox, of Bramham in the County of West Yorkshire, 1981 (for life)
Marcia Agnes Mary Lane-Fox; 1904–1980 | Francis Lane Fox; 1899–1989 | James Henry Lane-Fox b. 1912 | Felicity Lane-Fox; 1918–1988; Baroness Lane-Fox | Michael Pitt-Rivers; 1917–1999 | Julian Pitt-Rivers; 1919–2001 | George Anthony Lane-Fox Pitt-Rivers b. 1932 | Valerie Pitt-Rivers b. 1939 | William Oliver Lane Fox-Pitt; 1932–2012
Barony Lane-Fox extinct, 1988
George Francis Lane Fox; 1931–2012 | Robin Lane Fox b. 1946 | William Fox-Pitt b. 1969
Baroness Lane-Fox, of Solo in the City of Westminster, 2013 (for life)
Edward Lane Fox b. 1976 | Martha Lane Fox b. 1973; Baroness Lane-Fox

== Viscount Lanesborough (1728; Second creation) ==
- see Earl of Lanesborough
