= Horace Pitt-Rivers =

Horace Pitt-Rivers may refer to:

- Horace Pitt-Rivers, 3rd Baron Rivers, British nobleman and gambler
- Horace Pitt-Rivers, 6th Baron Rivers, British peer and army officer
