= Stepleton House =

Grade I listed building in Dorset, England

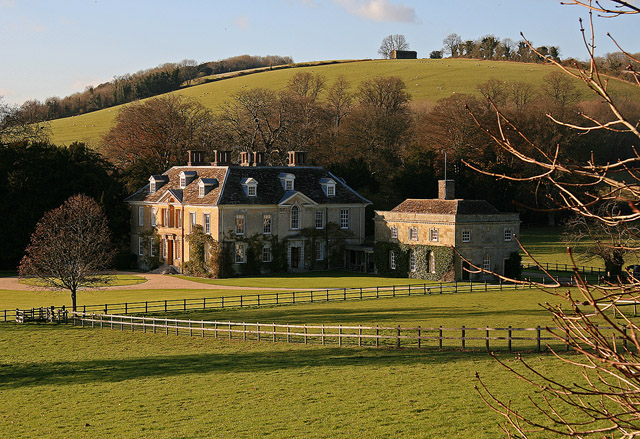

- Location within Dorset

General information
- Type: Country house
- Location: Iwerne Stepleton, Dorset, England
- Coordinates: 50.9009°N 2.1958°W
- Completed: 17th century

Stepleton House is a 17th-century country house in the parish of Iwerne Stepleton in Dorset, situated about 5 kilometres (3 mi) north of Blandford Forum, Dorset, England. It is a Grade I listed building.

Originally built around a courtyard, the house is now a six- by five-bay block with flanking pavilions. It is constructed of ashlar in two storeys plus basement and attics with a hipped stone slate roof. The main house dates from the 17th century and the pavilions from the 18th century. The six-bay frontage has a two-bay pedimented centrepiece. The house stands in a 110-hectare (270-acre) park through which runs the River Iwerne.

The grounds and the stable block are separately Grade II listed.

== History ==
Stepleford House was built for Thomas Fownes in 1634 on land he had bought from George Pitt of Stratfield Saye, Hampshire. It was sold by his descendant, also Thomas Fownes, in 1745 for £12,500 to Julines Beckford, son of a rich Jamaican plantation owner. Beckford remodelled the house and developed the grounds, creating a lake by damming the River Iwerne. He was MP for Salisbury for 10 years and Sheriff of Dorset for 1749–50. On his death in 1764 the property passed to his only son Peter Beckford, MP.

Beckford became the patron of the composer Muzio Clementi, whom he discovered at the age of 14 in Rome, and who lived with Beckford in Stepleton House from 1766–73.

Peter's grandson, George Pitt-Rivers, 4th Baron Rivers, let the house to Sir John Hadley D'Oyly, and Lord Rivers' last surviving daughter eventually sold the house in 1917 to Sir Randolph Baker. Since then it has passed through several ownerships and still remains in private hands.
