= Old English Cemetery, Livorno =

Cemetery in Toscana, Italy

Old English Cemetery
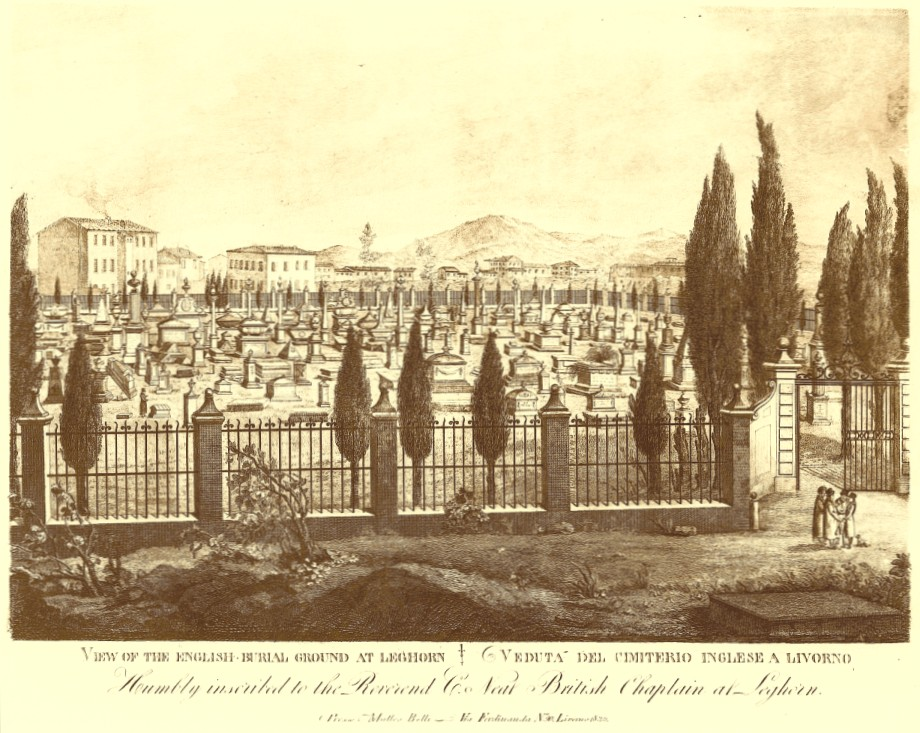
- The English Burial Ground (19th-century engraving)
- Interactive map of Old English Cemetery

Details
- Established: 1645
- Location: Livorno
- Country: Italy
- Coordinates: 43°32′45″N 10°18′37″E
- Type: Anglican
- Find a Grave: Old English Cemetery

The Old English Cemetery (Italian: Antico cimitero degli inglesi) is a cemetery in Livorno (Leghorn), central Italy, located on a plot of land near the Via Verdi, close to the Waldensian Church and to the formerly Anglican church of St. George. It is the oldest Protestant cemetery in Italy.

== History ==
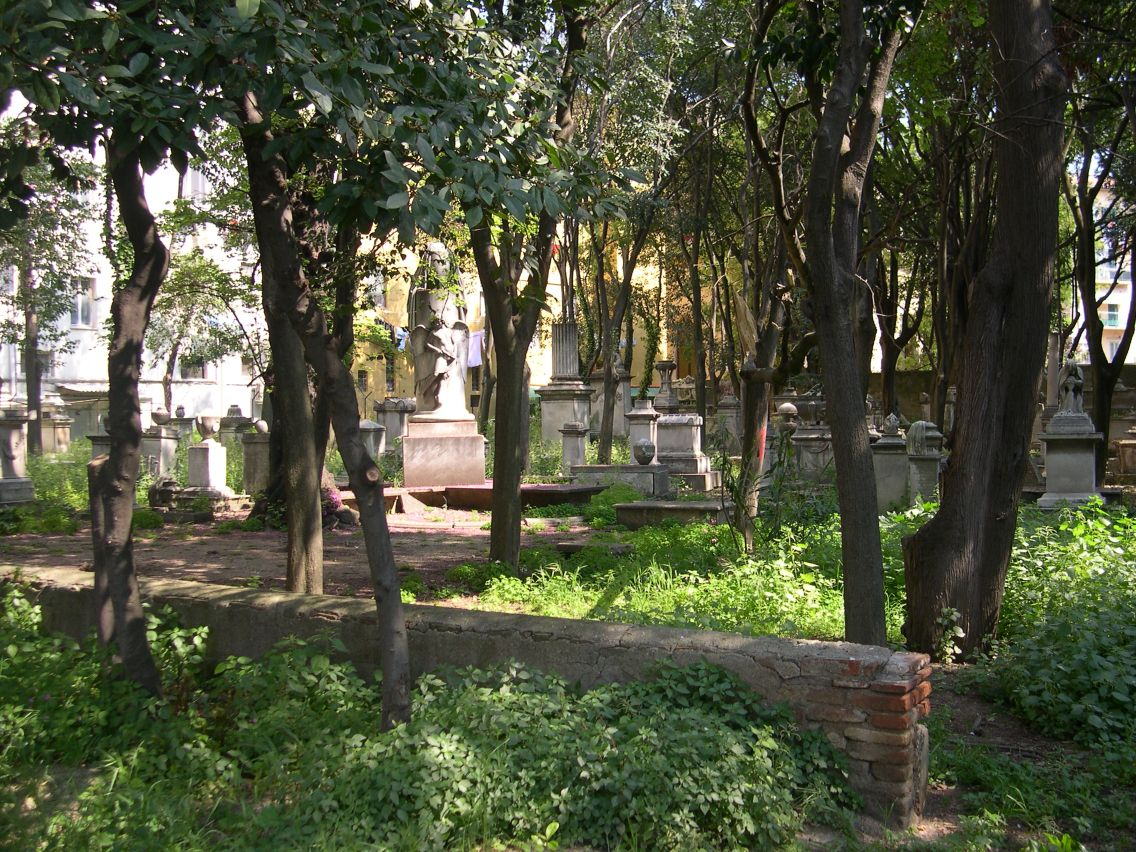
The cemetery, showing the need for maintenance

In the late 16th century, the English Levant Company, trading with the Ottoman Empire, established a significant commercial presence in the city they knew as Leghorn. Soon the English community, which was predominately Anglican, needed a burial place for its dead. Some historians argue that the cemetery was founded before 1609, although the oldest graves are dated around the 1640s. Some sources say that in 1594 the burial ground was opened by authorization of the Grand Duke Ferdinando I, who had recently completed a commercial agreement with Queen Elizabeth I. The cemetery was erected outside the city walls, in an area called "Fondo Magno". For a long time it was the only English and Protestant cemetery in Italy and probably in the entire Mediterranean area.

Initially the cemetery was unenclosed, which was rectified by the erection of railings in 1745, thanks to a substantial bequest from the wealthy merchant Robert Bateman. In 1838, during the construction of the new Anglican church of St. George, the cemetery was closed and replaced with a new one in the northern part of the city, close to the San Marco gate.

Despite the important historical value of the cemetery, and against the advice of art historians, in 2007 the construction of a huge multi-level parking lot was started just a few yards from the cemetery walls, replacing the historical Odeon cinema. In 2009 a restoration and study project was started by a group of volunteers and is still ongoing (April 2013).

== Description ==
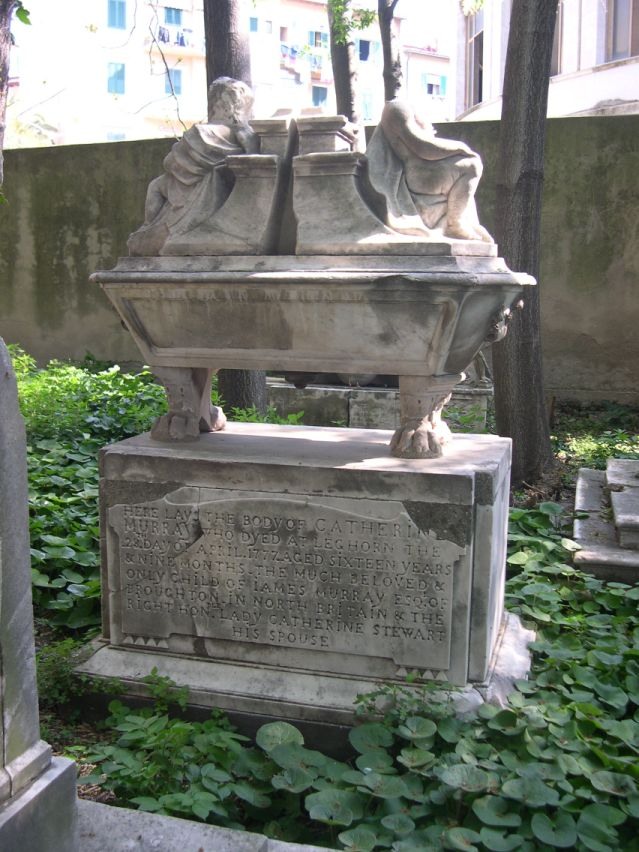
Catherine Murray's grave

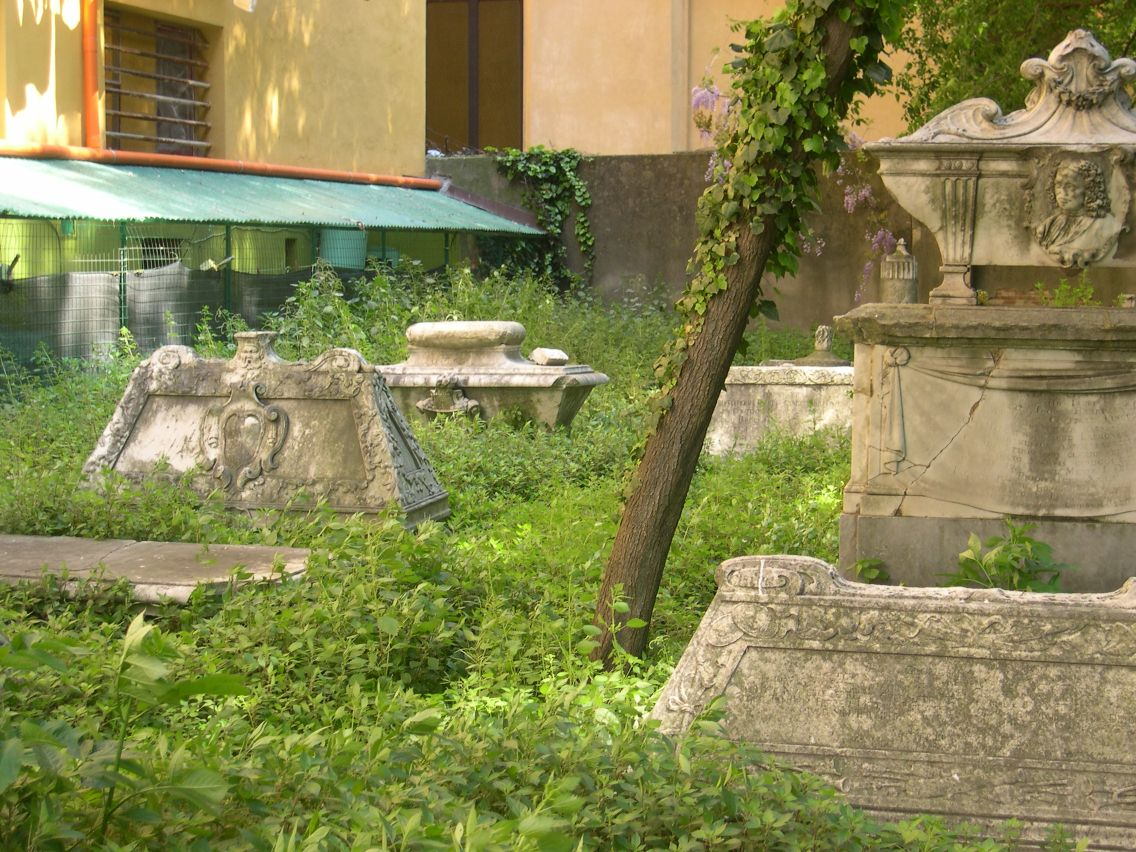
Signs of decay at this historical burial ground

The cemetery survived damage caused by bombing during World War II, which also damaged the adjoining Waldensian and St. George's churches in Livorno.

After the Second World War the cemetery was to be found hidden behind a large six-storey apartment-block, showing the distinct lack of sensitivity of the local administration of the time.

The entrance is located in a small square, accessible through the property of the Arciconfraternita della Misericordia. The cemetery is a large quadrangle, characterized by dense arboreal vegetation, with century-old cypress trees and various Mediterranean plants. A notable feature is the presence of what some believe are elms from Virginia, said to have been planted by American sailors visiting the graves of their loved ones.

Among the most ancient graves is that of Leonardo Digges, son of Dudley Digges, whose grave, dated 1646, is decorated with a bas-relief, which served as a model for many other monuments in the cemetery. Also notable are some graves from the 18th century, such as Robert Bateman's grave, which have convex and concave shapes. At the end of the 18th century and in the 19th century, the Neoclassical style of decoration became evident in the monuments, which often bore citations from the works of Bertel Thorvaldsen, who lived in Livorno.

== Notable burials ==
Notable people buried here include:

- John Pollexfen Bastard (1756–1816), British Tory politician and colonel of the East Devonshire Militia, who died and was initially buried in Livorno then reburied in England. His monument, almost completely illegible, still stands here, recently found by researchers.
- Robert Bateman (d. 1743), the English merchant who donated money to have railings erected around the cemetery.
- William Robert Broughton (1762–1821), Captain in the Royal Navy, Surveyor.
- Sir Thomas Dilkes (c. 1667–1707), Rear admiral in the Royal Navy, who died of a fever while anchored in the city.
- Hedvig Eleonora von Fersen (1753–1792), Swedish noble and courtier.
- Thomas Hall (1750–1824), American chaplain of the British Factory at Leghorn.
- Francis Horner (1778–1817), Scottish MP who died in Pisa.
- Margaret King (1773–1835), writer, traveller, and medical adviser. She was the favoured pupil of Mary Wollstonecraft and later, in Italy, she offered maternal aid to Wollstonecraft's daughter Mary Shelley (author of Frankenstein) and her travelling companions, husband Percy Bysshe Shelley and stepsister Claire Clairmont.
- William Henry Lambton (1764–1797), Freemason, MP for Durham, father of John George Lambton, 1st Earl of Durham.
- Mary Lane (d. 1790); the epitaph on her tomb is said to have inspired Henry Wadsworth Longfellow, when he visited the cemetery in 1828, to write his poem Suspiria.
- Louisa Pitt (c. 1755–1791), wife of Sir Peter Beckford, lover of William Thomas Beckford, the author of the novel Vathek.
- William Magee Seton (1768–1803), wealthy American businessman and merchant from New York. Husband of Saint Elizabeth Ann Seton. He died in Pisa after his quarantine in the San Jacopo Lazzaretto. Originally buried in this cemetery, William's remains were transferred to the modern Catholic Church of St. Elizabeth Seton in the city's Piazza Lavagna in 2004. The bombing during World War II damaged his original slab and destroyed other burials around. He died as a Protestant and now lies in a Catholic sacred ground alongside his dear friend Antonio Filicchi.
- Tobias Smollett (1721–1771), Scottish writer who died in Livorno, whose grave is surmounted by a fine obelisk.
- Richard Starke (c. 1720–1794), father of the travel writer Mariana Starke, of the East India Co., Governor of Madras at Fort Saint George.
- John Wood (†1653), Captain of the merchantman Peregrine, part of Capt. Henry Appleton's squadron, in the Battle of Leghorn, during which he died. It is the only remaining burial in Livorno related to this important naval battle.

== See also ==
- English Cemetery, Florence
- Protestant Cemetery, Rome

== Sources ==
- M. Giunti e G. Lorenzini (eds.), Un archivio di pietra: l'antico cimitero degli inglesi di Livorno: note storiche e progetti di restauro, Ospedaletto (Pisa), Pacini Editore, 2013.
- G. Panessa, M.T. Lazzarini, La Livorno delle Nazioni. I luoghi della memoria, Livorno 2006.
- G. Piombanti, Guida storica ed artistica della città e dei dintorni di Livorno, Livorno 1903.
- B. Allegranti, Cimiteri monumentali di Livorno : guida ai beni storici e artistici : i cimiteri della nazione ebrea, inglese e olandese-alemanna, Pisa, Pacini, 1996.
- S. Villani, Alcune note sulle recinzioni dei cimiteri acattolici livornesi in Nuovi studi livornesi – Vol. 11 (2004), pp. 35–51
- M. Carmichael, G. Milner-Gibson-Cullum, F. Campbell-Macauley, The inscriptions in the old British cemetery of Leghorn, Livorno, R. Giusti, 1906.
