= Cuthbert Ellison =

Cuthbert Ellison may refer to

- Cuthbert Ellison (British Army officer) (1698–1785), Army officer and MP for Shaftesbury
- Cuthbert Ellison (Newcastle MP) (1783–1860), MP for Newcastle upon Tyne
