= George Pitt, 1st Baron Rivers =

British politician, militia officer and diplomat (1721–1803)

The Right Honourable The Lord Rivers
- c. 1768–1769 portrait

British ambassador to Sardinia
- In office 1761–1768
- Monarch: George III
- Preceded by: James Stuart-Mackenzie
- Succeeded by: William Lynch

British ambassador to Spain
- In office 1770–1771
- Monarch: George III
- Preceded by: Sir James Gray
- Succeeded by: The Lord Grantham

Personal details
- Born: 1 May 1721 Geneva, Canton of Geneva
- Died: 7 May 1803 (aged 82) Stratfield Saye, Hampshire
- Education: Magdalen College, Oxford

Military service
- Allegiance: Great Britain
- Branch/service: British Militia
- Years of service: 1759–1798
- Rank: Colonel
- Commands: Dorset Militia
- Battles/wars: Seven Years' War

Colonel George Pitt, 1st Baron Rivers (1 May 1721 – 7 May 1803) was a British politician, militia officer and diplomat who served as the British ambassador to Spain from 1770 to 1771.

== Background and education ==
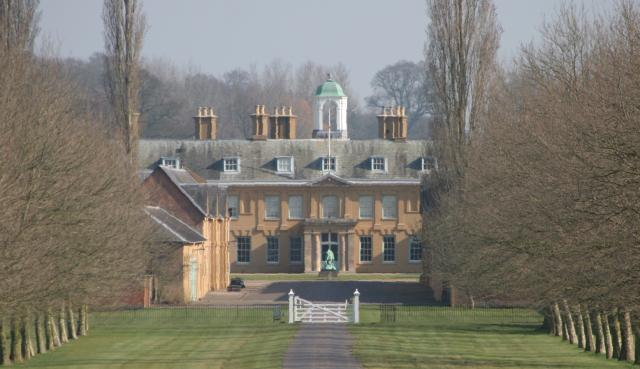
Stratfield Saye House

He was born in Geneva, the eldest son of George Pitt of Stratfieldsaye (today rendered Stratfield Saye), Hampshire, and his wife Mary Louise Bernier from Strasbourg. General Sir William Augustus Pitt was his younger brother. He was educated at Winchester, with attendance recorded in 1731, and matriculated on 26 September 1737 at Magdalen College, Oxford, being awarded a Master of Arts on 13 March 1739 and a Doctor of Civil Law on 21 August 1745. He travelled on the continent from 1740 to 1742 and succeeded his father in 1745. He inherited Stratfield Saye House in Hampshire, making extensive alterations to the house and park.

== Politics ==
Soon after returning from Europe Pitt was elected in a parliamentary by-election as a Tory member of Parliament for Shaftesbury following the death of Charles Ewer. Sitting in the House of Commons of Great Britain, Pitt voted with the opposition during the War of the Austrian Succession against the employment of the Hanoverian Army. At the 1747 British general election he stood for Shaftesbury largely on his own interest although Anthony Ashley Cooper, 4th Earl of Shaftesbury endorsed him a few weeks before the poll. Pitt also stood for the constituency of Dorset, a Tory stronghold, and was returned for both constituencies, choosing to sit for Dorset. In his electoral survey of c. 1749, John Perceval, 2nd Earl of Egmont, examining individuals' political support for and on behalf of Frederick, Prince of Wales, considered Pitt "not proper".

Pitt represented Dorset continuously until 1774, becoming an independent and supporting the government from the accession of George III in 1760 onwards. During the Seven Years' War he became colonel of the Dorset Militia in 1757 when the regiment was reorganised under the Militia Act 1757. Pitt continued to serve as the regimental colonel until resigning in 1798. In 1760 he was appointed as a Groom of the Bedchamber to George III, holding the office until 1770 when Pitt was asked to resign to make way for Sir George Osborn, 4th Baronet, a cousin of British Prime Minister Frederick North, Lord North.

== Diplomacy ==
From 1761 to 1768 Pitt served as the British envoy-extraordinary to Sardinia at Turin, although he went on leave in 1764 and never returned. In 1770 Pitt was appointed as the British ambassador to Spain but was superseded by Lord Grantham in the following year.

== Peerage ==
On 20 May 1776, he was raised to the peerage as Baron Rivers, of Stratfield Saye, Hampshire. His ancestor George Pitt (d.1694) of Stratfield Saye, had married Jane Savage, daughter of John Savage, 2nd Earl Rivers. In 1780, he was appointed Lord Lieutenant of Hampshire, but was replaced in 1782, when he became a Lord of the Bedchamber. He was appointed Lord Lieutenant of Dorset in 1793. On 16 March 1802, he obtained a new patent as Baron Rivers, of Sudeley Castle, Gloucestershire, with special remainder, in default of male issue, to his brother Sir William and his issue male, failing which to his daughter Louisa's son Horace Beckford and his issue male. He died on 7 May 1803 at Stratfield Saye and was succeeded by his only son, George.

== Family ==
On 4 January 1746, at Oxford Chapel, Marylebone, he married Penelope, daughter of Sir Henry Atkins, 4th Baronet, of Clapham, Surrey. They had four children:

- Penelope Pitt (1749–1827) married Edward, Viscount Ligonier, in 1766; divorced in 1771 and married Joseph Brown in 1784
- George Pitt, 2nd Baron Rivers (1751–1828)
- Louisa Pitt (1754–1791), married Sir Peter Beckford (1740–1811) on 22 March 1773
- Marcia Lucy Pitt (1756–1822), married James Fox-Lane in 1789

Their marriage was unhappy and they separated in 1771, living mostly in France and Italy until her death on 1 January 1795 in Milan. She was buried in the Protestant Cemetery in Livorno, Italy.

== Legacy ==
Rivers Inlet, a fjord on the Central Coast of British Columbia, was named by Captain George Vancouver for George Pitt.

Parliament of Great Britain
| Preceded by Charles Ewer; Peter Walter | Member of Parliament for Shaftesbury; 1742–1747; With: Peter Walter | Succeeded by Cuthbert Ellison; William Beckford |
| Preceded by George Chafin; Edmund Morton Pleydell | Member of Parliament for Dorset; 1754–1774; With: George Chafin 1747–1754; Humphry Sturt 1754–1774 | Succeeded by George Pitt; Humphry Sturt |
Military offices
| New regiment | Colonel of the Dorset Militia; 1757–1798 | Succeeded by The Earl of Dorchester |
Diplomatic posts
| Preceded by James Mackenzie | Minister at Turin; 1761–1768 | Succeeded by William Lynch |
| Preceded by Sir James Gray, Bt | Ambassador to Spain; 1770–1771 | Succeeded by The Lord Grantham |
Honorary titles
| Preceded by The Duke of Chandos | Lord Lieutenant of Hampshire; 1780–1782 | Succeeded by The Duke of Bolton |
| Preceded by The Earl Digby | Lord Lieutenant of Dorset; 1793–1803 | Succeeded by The Earl of Dorchester |
Peerage of Great Britain
| New creation | Baron Rivers; 3rd creation 1776–1803 | Succeeded by George Pitt |
Peerage of the United Kingdom
| New creation | Baron Rivers; 4th creation 1802–1803 | Succeeded by George Pitt |
