= Portrait of William Beckford =

Painting by Joshua Reynolds

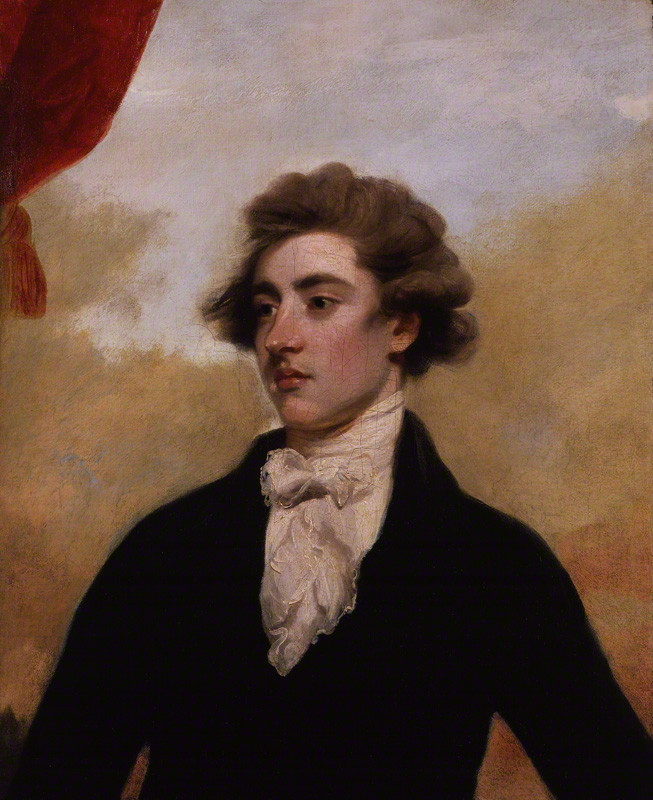
- Artist: Joshua Reynolds
- Year: 1782
- Type: Oil on canvas, portrait painting
- Dimensions: 72.7 cm × 58.4 cm (28.6 in × 23.0 in)
- Location: National Portrait Gallery, London

Portrait of William Beckford is a 1782 portrait painting by the British artist Joshua Reynolds. It depicts William Beckford, noted as a novelist during the Georgian era. Having inherited vast wealth from his Jamaican slave-owning father William Beckford, the younger William pursued his interests in the arts. He is known for his creation of Fonthill Abbey in Wiltshire.

Reynolds was a celebrated portraitist, a founder member of the Royal Academy of Arts and its First President. It was exhibited at the Royal Academy's Summer Exhibition in 1782 and much later at the British Institution in 1862. Today the painting is in the collection of the National Portrait Gallery in London, having been acquired in 1980.

== Bibliography ==
- Esposito, Donato. Sir Joshua Reynolds: The Acquisition of Genius. Sansom, 2009.
- Gauci, Perry. William Beckford: First Prime Minister of the London Empire. Yale University Press, 2013.
- Ingamells, John. National Portrait Gallery Mid-Georgian Portraits, 1760-1790. National Portrait Gallery, 2004.
