= Humphrey Sturt =

British landowner, architect and politician

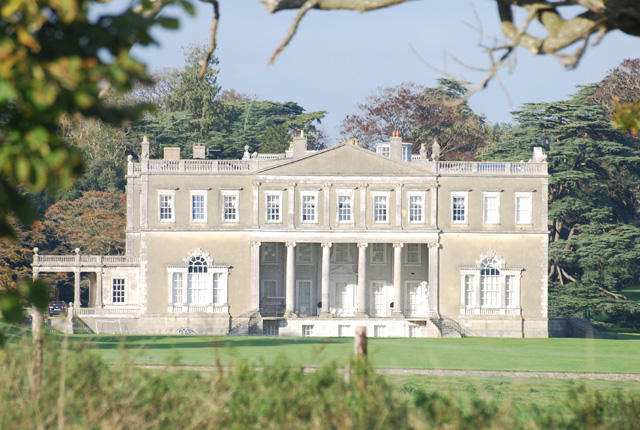
Crichel House

Humphrey Sturt (c. 1724 – 20 October 1786) was a British landowner, architect and politician who sat in the House of Commons from 1754 to 1784.

== Early life and family ==
Sturt was the son of Humphrey Sturt (1687-1740) of Horton and Diana Napier (died 1740), daughter of Sir Nathaniel Napier, 3rd Baronet of Critchell More. He matriculated at Queen's College, Oxford on 27 April 1741, aged 16. He married Mary Pitfield, daughter of Charles Pitfield and Dorothy Ashley, on 27 April 1756 at St James, Westminster, London.

He owed his wealth to his grandfather, Sir Anthony Sturt, who had been a successful business man and City of London alderman and Victualler to the Navy. Diana Napier, his mother, was the great great granddaughter of Sir Nathaniel Napier the builder of Crichel House, and it was through her that the house passed to the Sturts.

== Political career ==
Sturt was the Lord of Horton Manor. He was returned unopposed as the Member of Parliament for Dorset at the 1754 general election and was classed as a Tory. He was returned again unopposed at the general elections of 1761, 1768, 1774 and 1780. He did not stand in 1784.

== Estate and works ==
He was responsible for remodelling Crichel House at the nearby village of Moor Crichel. He wanted more than that just one house with a setting of comparable splendour. At Horton he had already created a 200-acre (0.81 km^{2}) lake, and he resolved to indulge this whim again at Moor Crichel, albeit on a smaller scale. There was only one difficulty: the cottages of the village were in the way. The site of the former village of Moor Crichel now lies submerged beneath the waters of the crescent-shaped lake. The entire village was moved to what is now called New Town at Witchampton, leaving only the church (rebuilt in 1850) and an elegantly landscaped park in front of the classical mansion.

Sturt had many ideas for the improvement of agriculture, which he introduced both in the Crichels and on Brownsea Island in Poole Harbour. He used steam power for threshing and transformed Brownsea Island by importing vast quantities of manure and planting new crops. The estates passed to Humphrey Sturt's younger son, Charles Sturt.

== Horton Tower ==
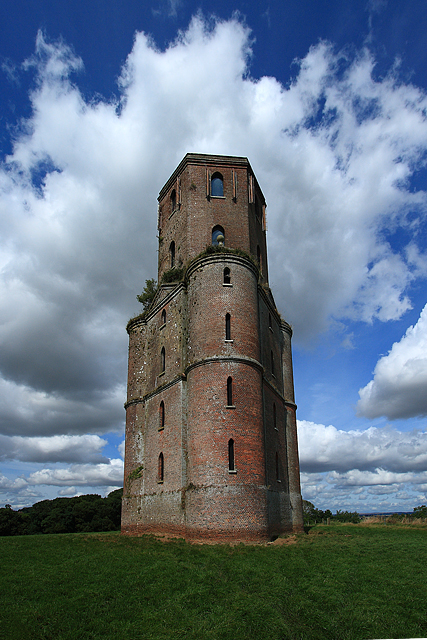
Horton Tower, the architectural folly designed by Sturt

Sturt designed the Horton Tower in Horton, Dorset, built 1750. Horton Tower, also known as Sturt's Folly, is an architectural folly with six stories, 140 feet (43 m) high. It had a fireplace halfway up. Taylor's 1765 map of Dorset describes it as an 'Observatory', but according to one local legend it was built by Sturt as a viewing platform from which he could watch the local hunt when he was too old to ride to hounds.

Sturt died on 20 October 1786. He and his wife had ten sons and five daughters, including:

- Charles Sturt, father of Henry Charles Sturt (9 August 1795 – 14 April 1866) who married Lady Charlotte Penelope, daughter of Robert Brudenell, 6th Earl of Cardigan.

Parliament of Great Britain
Preceded by George Chafin; George Pitt	Member of Parliament for Dorset; 1754–1784; With: George Pitt 1754-1774; Hon. George Pitt 1774-1784	Succeeded by Francis John Browne; Hon. George Pitt
