= Azemia =

1797 novel by William Thomas Beckford

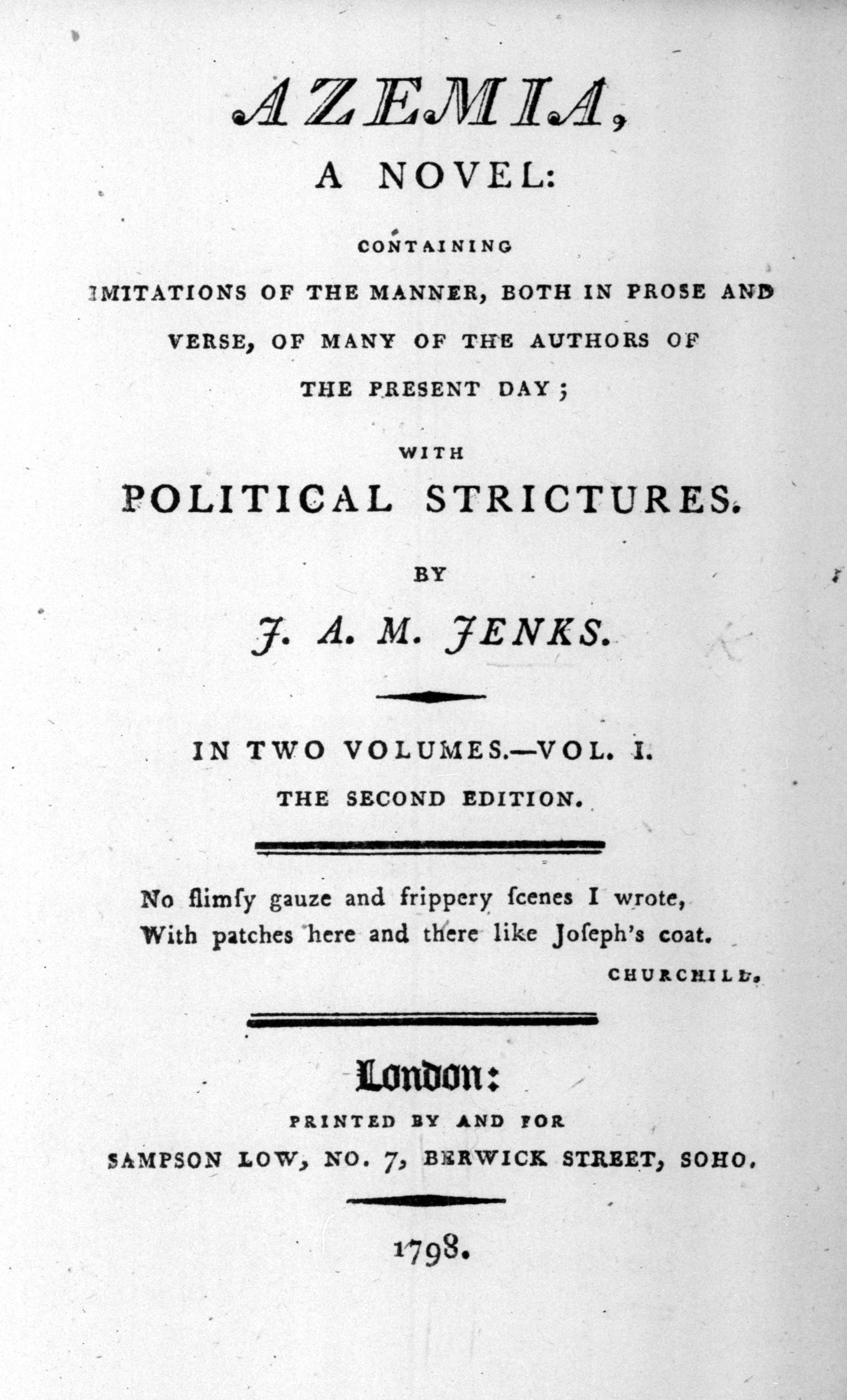
- Title page of the first volume of the second edition, 1798
- Author: William Thomas Beckford
- Genre: Satire
- Publication date: 1797
- Publication place: United Kingdom

Azemia is a satirical novel, written by William Thomas Beckford, that was first published in 1797. The book parodies what Beckford considered sensationalist writing, as well as political issues of the time.

== Plot ==
=== Volume I ===
- Chapter 1- We learn that Azemia is the 45th daughter of Hamet-beig, who is the leader of a harem and does not know his daughter very well. She is very close with her grandmother, Birkabeba, though. We also find out that Azemia's betrothed, Oglow, has sent for her to join him in Marseille. She leaves immediately and is accompanied by Muzzled-Abib. On the third day of her journey, Azemia's ship is attacked and Captain Wappingshot holds her and Muzzled-Abib prisoner.
- Chapter 2- Captain Wappingshot leaves Muzzled-Abib on Barbary Coast.
- Chapter 3- Charles Arnold, a ship hand, discovers Azemia and instantly falls in love with her and writes a poem. They arrive in England.
- Chapter 4- Charles attempts to convey his love to Azemia but she does not understand English so he uses his eyes and she understands. She loves him too because he is the only friendly face she has seen thus far. Mrs. Periwinkle and her daughter Miss Sally agree to take Azemia under their care.
- Chapter 5- The narrator (under the pretense that the narrator is a woman) digresses and muses how women can be good writers if the criterion is that they have to understand themselves if men are not even very good at that. The narrator then goes on to promise the reader not to write about slavery so as not to offend the slaves and also to show the proper respect for nobles.
- Chapter 6- Mrs. Periwinkle attempts to introduce Azemia to the Duke that employs her. However, the Duke takes sick with the gout and Azemia is forced to stay with Lady Belinda, one of the Duke's close friends.
- Chapter 7- Wildcodger proposes to hang painting of food to make the hungry feel full and houses so the homeless will feel as though they have shelter.
- Chapter 8- Reverend Solomon Sheepend is introduced and Miss Ironside sets out to teach Azemia how to speak English.
- Chapter 9-A feud between Reverend Solomon who writes poetry in blank verse and Iphanissa who writes Italian sonnets is discussed.
- Chapter 10- Reverend Solomon has become very fond of Azemia and wishes to marry her. However, he learns that he must convert her to Christianity if this is to be possible. He writes a 3,996 line poem to show his love, it goes relatively unnoticed. Also, Miss Ironside becomes upset with Azemia for allegedly seducing her nephew, Reverend Solomon. Mrs. Blandford takes Azemia because she reminds Mrs. Blandford of her deceased daughter. Mrs. Blandford finishes teaching Azemia English.

==== Story of Another Blue Beard ====
Mr. Grimshaw is the Esquire of a manor who is very cruel to his subordinates and especially wife. His current wife attempts to escape from his manor by the help of the ghost of deceased wife but her plan is thwarted and she is held captive. Mr. Grimshaw throws Mrs. Grimshaw in the dungeon for over a year sometimes going days with only bread and water. On a second attempt at escape, Mrs. Grimshaw meets an old family friend, Mr. Auberry, who had come to check on her well-being. Mr. Auberry learns of her misfortunes but cannot help her. Meanwhile, Mrs. Grimshaw learns that the ghost is Gertrude Grimshaw and that Mr. Grimshaw had killed her and her brother so they now walk the castle at midnight (the time of their deaths). Finally, Mrs. Grimshaw escapes with the help of the ghosts and Mr. Auberry who she then marries.

=== Volume II ===
- Chapter 1- The main story line is resumed and the reader finds that Revered Solomon is in deep mourning because he loves Azemia and she is not in his possession.
- Chapter 2-Azemia is in the midst of a get together with Mr. Gallstone, Sir Baptist Bamboozle, Mrs. Albuzzi, and Dr. Prose. Mrs. Albuzzi mentions a servant of Azemia's but Mrs. Albuzzi neglects to elaborate and it is never brought up again.
- Chapter 3-Due to the fact that Azemia is foreign, Mrs. Blandford's social standing is elevated amongst her cultivated friends. Mrs. Blandford hosts a dinner party.
- Chapter 4-Azemia comments on the hypocrisy of the British women by saying that, with very few exceptions, they do "nothing but find fault in each other."
- Chapter 5-Charles Arnold along with his servant, Bat, is travelling back to see Azemia after a year at sea.
- Chapter 6-Azemia enters a dark, black mausoleum. A bell tolls, a form appears and Azemia faints. It turns out to be Lord Scudabout who scared her on purpose.
- Chapter 7- Colonel and Lady Arsinoe Brusque host a dinner party where multiple distinguished guests talk about politics and poetry.
- Chapter 8-Azemia is put off by the antics and masks at a grand masquerade. Azemia is followed by a man who she finds very annoying. The man is revealed to be Mr. Perkly, a childhood friend of Charles Arnold.
- Chapter 9-Mrs. Blandford, Azemia, and Mr. Perkly are riding back home in Mr. Perkly's carriages. They are stopped when the driver of Azemia and Mrs. Blandford's cart is missing a lynchpin. They notice a small cabin and attempt to take rest there but discover that the inhabitants are stricken by extreme poverty and are dying of malnutrition. Mrs. Blandford is horrified by their predicament and hires a nurse and an apothecary to come to their aide. Mrs. Blandford and Mr. Perkly also have a heated discussion about moral and economic issues dealing with the poor, Mrs. Blandford finds Mr. Perkly's views to be cold and moronic.
- Chapter 10- Mrs. Blandford leaves Azemia alone because she is called upon by an ailing friend in London. Mr. Perkly visits the house while she is away but is sent off by Azemia. Mrs. Blandford sends for Azemia to come to London but Azemia's coach takes her through a dark forest and eventually back to the Duke's manor and Miss Sally. It is then apparent that the Duke instructed Mr. Perkly to befriend Azemia and Mrs. Blandford so as to seize Azemia when the opportunity arose.
- Chapter 11-After a few weeks with Azemia under his care, the Duke falls madly in love with her. The Duke takes leave of his manor on business and leaves Azemia mostly unattended. She uses this opportunity to walk about the grounds late at night. While on one of her walks, Azemia is captured by three ruffians who are torturing rabbits.
- Chapter 12-Azemia is being led to a deserted cabin when they cross a road and a gun fight ensues between the lead ruffian and an oncoming traveler. Two of the captors flee the scene and the leader sustained a gunshot wound. The traveler is Charles Arnold, who has been shot in the arm. He takes Azemia to his uncle's house and Bat removes the bullet from Charles Arnold's arm.
- Chapter 13-Charles wants to marry Azemia but only has 200 pounds and a lieutenant's salary to support them with. Both his uncle and Mrs. Blandford give them large sums of money so they can be wed.

== Characters ==
- Azemia-The heroine of the story. Captured from a ship sailing to Marseille and brought to England.
- Birkabeba-Azemia's grandmother. Favors and educates her granddaughter
- Hamet-Beig-Azemia's father.
- Oglow Mule-Azemia's betrothed, a very rich merchant.
- Muzzled-Abib-Governor of Oglow's harem, captured with Azemia and dropped off at Barbary Coast.
- Captain Wappingshot-Old man, capturer of Azemia.
- Charles Arnold-Very handsome lieutenant. Marries Azemia.
- Lady Belinda- The Duke's close friend.
- Wildcodger-Very smart, Azemia stays with him for a small time.
- Miss Grisadela Ursala Ironside- Cares for Azemia but gives her away due to jealousy.
- Reverend Solomon Sheepend- Miss Ironside's nephew, a poet, falls in love with Azemia.
- Mrs. Blandford-The primary caretaker of Azemia.
- Mr. Grimshaw- Very wealthy man, extremely mean.
- Mr. & Mrs. Walling- find Mrs. Grimshaw outside their house. Listen to her story.
- Mr. Auberry-Mrs. Grimshaw's friend and eventual rescuer and husband.
- Lord Scudabout-Young Irish nobleman.
- Colonel Brusque-Lifelong military man, unpleasant to be around.
- Mr. Perkly-Charles Arnold's alleged childhood friend.
- Bat- Charles Arnold's faithful servant.
- Mr. Winyard-Charles Arnold's uncle.

== Authorship ==
Beckford attempted to solidify the identity of Azemia’s false author, Jacquette Agenta Mariana Jenks, by including a rather flowery letter of dedication "To the Right Honourable Lady Harriet Marlow", which presents the novel as an "inferior production" being given to Lady Marlow by an admiring fan. In this dedication, Beckford subtly weaved the kind of feminine sentimentality that the novel is purported to critique, in admitting the story as an indulgence of "the trepidating tenderness of a too sensible imagination". The Minerva Press, seen as the target of Beckford's critique, was a large presence in publishing during Beckford's time.
Critics, however, were not fooled by Azemias pseudonym, Miss Jenks, and in fact many aligned its author with that of "The Right Honorable Lady Harriet Marlow", which is the pseudonym used by Beckford in writing The Modern Novel. Such a connection was made apparent in Azemia’s dedication to Lady Marlow., The British Critic rightly identified the similarity between these two of Beckford's works, but went so far as to claim the topic as "exhausted in the first attempt"; the "first attempt" being The Modern Novel, which had been reviewed in the journal's previous volume. Furthermore, the novel's author was assumed to be male, thus "false delicacy" was not assumed by the reviewer.
In an attempt to counter the unveiling of Azemia's author as male, Beckford revised subsequent editions of the work to include an "Address", which deals directly with the assumption that Modern Novel Writing, and this by association of authorship, Azemia, were written by a male, more specifically Robert Merry. His justification comes in the form of a parable, prefaced by yet another stab at feminine inferiority cloaked as humility, called "Edward and Ellen". The story, having nothing to do with the novel itself, if merely meant to illustrate through its supposed shared authorship by Miss Jenks, that the author of Azemia is undoubtedly female.

== Critical reviews ==
Azemia received mixed reviews, but a general trend among reviewers was to rave about the poetic prowess while expressing disdain for the prose itself. For example, The Critical Review states plainly, "the satirical poetry in this work is preferable to the prose", while other publications such as British Review glorify the poetry as "well, and even happily executed." Many reviews seemed to recognize the capability of the author, and claimed regret that his talents were used in such an inferior fashion, as in the Lady's Monthly Museum profile of Beckford. Their article supports his aim "to hold up to ridicule the flimsy narrative of those affected scribblers whose volumes loaded the shelves of our circulating libraries". They too, however, express regret as his having wasted his time and talent on such an endeavor. In fact, Beckford himself acknowledges its position in Azemia's "Address" Despite disappointment in the work as a whole, the Monthly Review went so far as to claim the work as "under the direction of GENIUS" and that its quality, though perhaps not superior, to be still "acceptable to many readers". The same review hails "Azemia" as ""an entertaining compound of good taste and good writing,- just satire and whimsical fancy".

== Available editions ==
- Valancourt Classics (2010) ISBN 1-934555-66-5
- Kessinger Publishing (2010, credited to Jacquetta Jenks) ISBN 1-1659-1840-4
- Gale ECCO (2010): Vol.1 ISBN 1-1705-2451-6; Vol.2 ISBN 1-1705-2452-4
