= Thomas Hall (minister at Leghorn) =

American minister (1750–1825)

Reverend Thomas Hall was born April 8, 1750, in the Township of Byberry, Pennsylvania, and was the second eldest son of Captain John Hall (1722–1798) and Sarah (Parry) Hall. He was a cousin of Dr. Benjamin Rush through his aunt, Susannah Hall, and a nephew of the Reverend Samuel Finley (1715–1766) through his aunt Sarah Hall (1728–1760).

Hall earned a B.A. degree from the University of Philadelphia (now the University of Pennsylvania) in 1773.

Thomas Hall is especially notable as an historical figure because during the years leading up to the American Revolution (especially during the years 1774 and 1775), Hall was a leading advocate of the acquisition of rights of all colonists in Philadelphia and later in Virginia. However, when it became apparent to him that the American colonies intended to split entirely with England, he left Virginia (where he had served in several Anglican parishes) and never returned to America.

A number of letters survive in which he recounts both his reasoning for his departure from America before the Revolution, as well as some of the details of his eventful life.

Thomas Hall first resided in England. He matriculated 9 October 1779 at the University of Leyden in the faculty of law in the Netherlands. He did not graduate at this university although he is mentioned in the publication of Peacock.

His uncle Dr. Benjamin Rush apprenticed under Dr. John Redman (physician) who also studied at the University of Leyden.

After serving as a minister in Bristol, Hall departed from London to Livorno, Italy in 1784, where he became the chaplain of the British Factory.

In 1803, upon the invasion of Livorno by Napoleon, Hall stood steadfast to defend again Napoleon's desire to destroy the Old English Cemetery there.

Hall died on April 12, 1825, and was buried in that cemetery.

Hall married Marianna Kleiber in Livorno in 1786 and they had four children. Their descendants can be found in Scotland, England, Italy and Australia.

Hall's brother in law, Sebastiano Kleiber, was a financial sponsor of author Mary Shelley during her stay in Livorno. His burial tomb, commissioned by his nephews (sons of Hall) was crafted by sculptor Lorenzo Bartolini, whose grand patron was Napoleon.
