= George Lane, 1st Viscount Lanesborough =

Irish politician

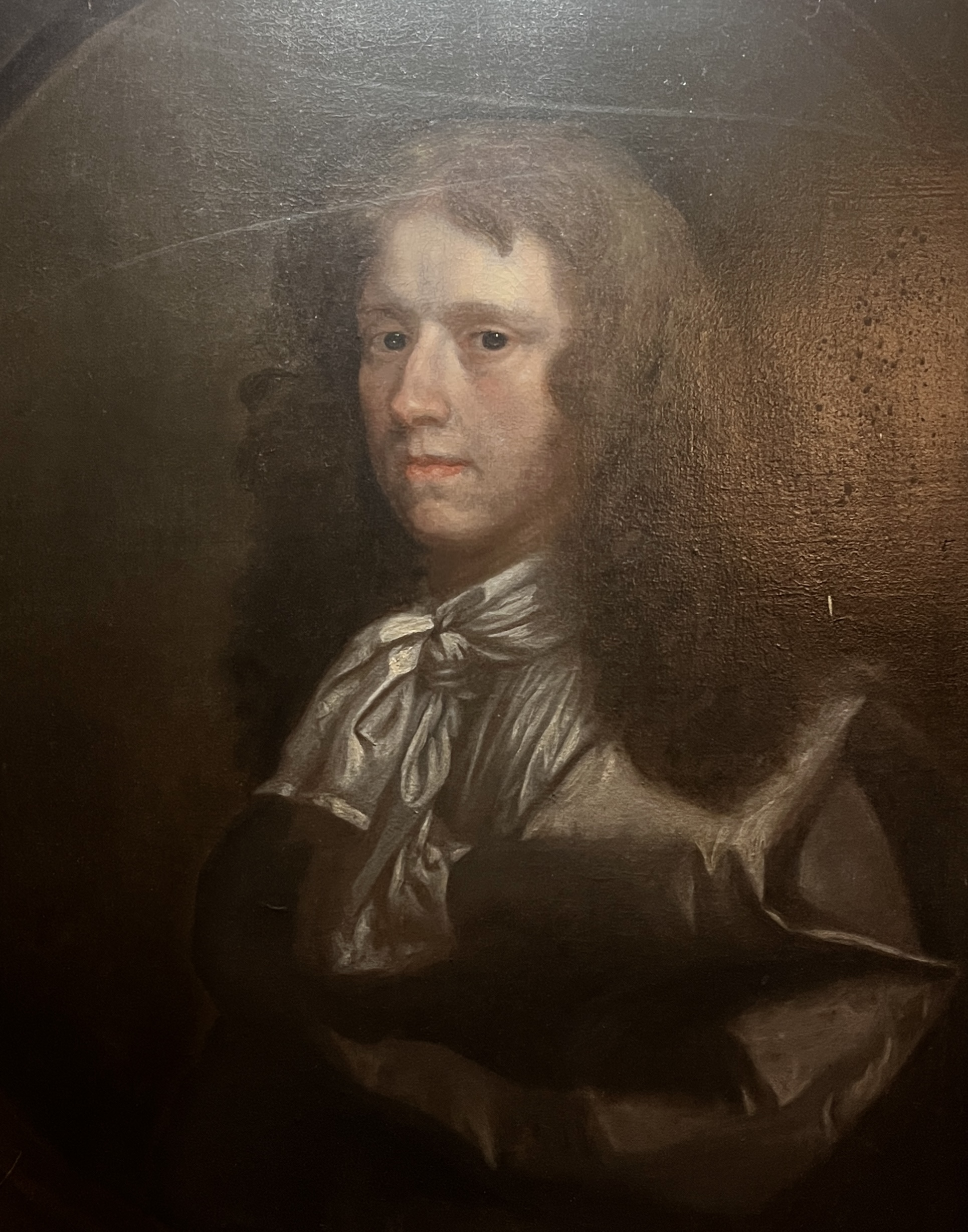
- Painting of Lane in Kilronan Castle, Ballyfarnon, County Roscommon, Ireland
- Born: c. 1620; Ireland
- Died: 11 December 1683; Ireland

George Lane, 1st Viscount Lanesborough (c. 1620 – 11 December 1683) was an Irish politician.

He was the son of Sir Richard Lane, 1st Baronet, of Tulsk, by his wife Mabel Fitzgerald.

== Career ==
He was attached to the exiled Court of Charles II of England, and was knighted by him at Bruges in 1657. The honour must have seemed a hollow one to Lane who, like most of the exiles who remained faithful to the King, was reduced to a state of near destitution: he spoke of his "torment" in being unable to get money to care for his sick wife and children.

After the Restoration he seems to have had considerable influence at Court: Samuel Pepys in his Diary in 1663 refers to Lane as "the man below stairs at Court".

From 1662 to 1666 he was Member of Parliament for County Roscommon. In November 1664 he was appointed to the Privy Council of Ireland, and on 5 October 1668, he succeeded his father as the second Baronet. He was created Viscount Lanesborough in the Peerage of Ireland on 31 July 1676. He was Secretary of State (Ireland) from 1665 until his death. According to Samuel Pepys, he was notorious for "selling offices". In fairness to Lane it must be remembered that only a few years earlier he and his family had been close to starvation, and he may well have felt that he had the right to make sure that they would have a secure future.

== Family ==
He had one surviving son, James and two daughters—Mary and Charlotte—by his first wife Dorcas Brabazon, daughter of Sir Anthony Brabazon and Margaret Hovenden, and niece of William Brabazon, 1st Earl of Meath, as well as several sons who died young. James succeeded him as second and last Viscount.

His second wife was Susannah Nicholas, daughter of the prominent statesman Sir Edward Nicholas and his wife Jane Jay, by whom he had three children who died young. She died in 1671.

His third wife was Frances Sackville (daughter of Richard Sackville, 5th Earl of Dorset and Lady Frances Cranfield) by whom he had another daughter, Frances. Frances married Ulick Burke, 1st Viscount Galway a Jacobite Colonel in the Irish Army, who was killed at the Battle of Aughrim in 1691. She married secondly Henry Fox and had issue including George Fox-Lane, 1st Baron Bingley, the eventual heir to the Lanesborough estates.

Lady Frances, Dowager Viscountess Lanesborough purchased manors and lands in Cobham, Surrey from the Gavell and Smither families (representing the ancestral Bigley, Sutton and Downe or Adowne patrimonies associated with Chertsey Abbey) in 1708 and 1720, and died in January 1721/22.

== Diary of Samuel Pepys ==
Lanesborough is mentioned several times in the Diary of Samuel Pepys. Pepys refers to his "below stairs" influence at Court, the alleged corruption of his Irish administration, and his celebrated lawsuit over a disputed property claim with the historian Philip Hore, who is now chiefly remembered for his history of County Wexford.

Political offices
Vacant Title last held by John Veele	Chief Secretary for Ireland; 1644–1646	Vacant Title next held by Matthew Locke
Peerage of Ireland
New creation	Viscount Lanesborough; 1676–1683	Succeeded by James Lane
Baronetage of Ireland
Preceded by Richard Lane	Baronet (of Tulske); 1668–1683	Succeeded by James Lane
