= Iwerne Stepleton =

Civil parish in Dorset, England

Coordinates: 50.908°N 2.174°W

Iwerne Stepleton (anciently Ewern Stapleton, etc.) is a small civil parish and former manor in the county of Dorset, England.

The parish comprises about 800 acres of land and lies on the eastern side of the River Iwerne. The soil is chalk. The surviving St Mary's parish church, to the west of the parish, was founded in about 1100 and stood originally surrounded by the village of Iwerne Stepleton, deserted at some time before 1662 and replaced by the surviving large structure of Stepleton House.
