= Louisa Pitt =

British aristocrat

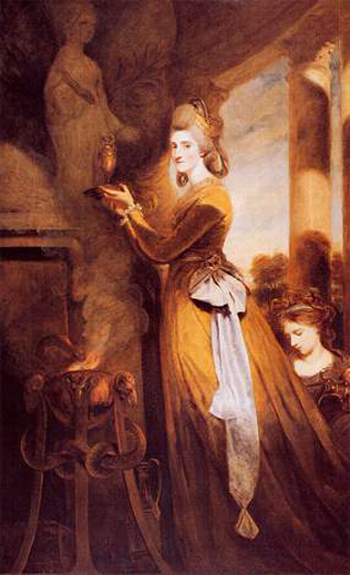
Portrait of Mrs Peter Beckford by Sir Joshua Reynolds, 1782

Louisa Pitt (born 1754 or 1756; died 1791) was the second daughter of the British diplomat and politician George Pitt, 1st Baron Rivers (1721–1803), and his wife, Penelope Atkins.

Pitt was born in 1754 (or 1756) in Stratfield Saye, Southampton, Hampshire, England. She married Sir Peter Beckford (1740–1811) on 22 March 1773 in Dorset. Sir Peter Beckford was a writer, a huntsman, and the cousin of the English novelist William Thomas Beckford (1760–1844), author of the famous Gothic novel Vathek. They had several children, of whom the surviving son became the 3rd Baron Rivers, succeeding his maternal uncle and maternal grandfather by special remainder.

After her marriage, Louisa Beckford had an affair with her husband's cousin William Beckford; at one point, totally smitten and desperate to regain his attention, she offered to participate in a ménage à trois at an infamous house party at Fonthill. She died of tuberculosis in 1791 in Florence and was buried in the Old English Cemetery in Livorno, Italy.
