= William Beckford (novelist) =

British writer and politician (1760–1844)

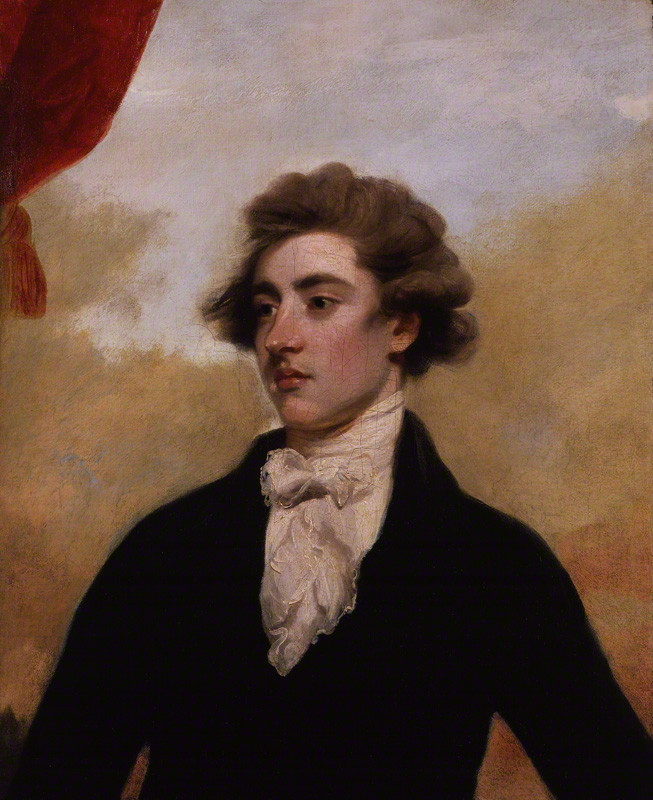
- Portrait of William Beckford by Sir Joshua Reynolds, 1782
- Born: 29 September 1760; Soho Square, London
- Died: 2 May 1844 (aged 83); Bath, Somerset
- Occupations: Writer, politician
- Notable work: Vathek (c. 1781); Memoirs of Extraordinary Painters (1780); Letters from Italy with Sketches of Spain and Portugal (1835)
- Father: William Beckford
- Relatives: George Hamilton (maternal grandfather)

William Thomas Beckford (29 September 1760 – 2 May 1844) was a British writer and politician. He was reputed at one stage to be England's richest commoner. Beckford was the son of William Beckford and Maria Hamilton, the daughter of George Hamilton. He served as a Member of Parliament for Wells in 1784–1790 and Hindon in 1790–1795 and 1806–1820. Beckford is best known for writing the 1786 Gothic novel Vathek, for building Fonthill Abbey in Wiltshire and Beckford's Tower in Bath, and for his extensive art collection.

== Biography ==
Beckford was born in the family's London home at 22 Soho Square on 29 September 1760. (Note: Other sources give a different day (1 October) or year (1759) or location (Fonthill Splendens, Wiltshire) for his birth.) At the age of ten, he inherited a fortune on the death of his father William Beckford, who had been twice a Lord Mayor of London. It consisted of £1 million in cash, an estate at Fonthill in Wiltshire (including the Palladian mansion Fonthill Splendens), several sugar plantations in Jamaica, and about 3,000 slaves.

This fortune allowed him to indulge his interest in art and architecture, as well as writing. He may have studied music with Dr James Nares (1715-1783), organist of the Chapel Royal. At the age of five he had three lessons with the eight year old Wolfgang Amadeus Mozart, whose significance he afterwards exaggerated, even claiming to a credulous biographer to have given Mozart the melody of Non più andrai. His drawing master, Alexander Cozens, was a greater influence, and Beckford continued to correspond with him for some years until they fell out.

On 5 May 1783 Beckford married Lady Margaret Gordon, a daughter of the fourth Earl of Aboyne. However, he was bisexual and after 1784 chose self-exile from British society when his letters to William Courtenay, later 9th Earl of Devon, were intercepted by the boy's uncle, who advertised the affair in the newspapers. Courtenay was just ten years old on first meeting Beckford, who was eight years older. About six years later, Beckford was discovered (according to a house guest at the time) to be "whipping Courtenay in some posture or another" after finding a letter penned by Courtenay to another lover. Although Beckford was never charged with child molestation, fornication or attempted buggery, social and family pressure obliged him to retire to the continent with his long-suffering wife, who died in childbirth aged 24.

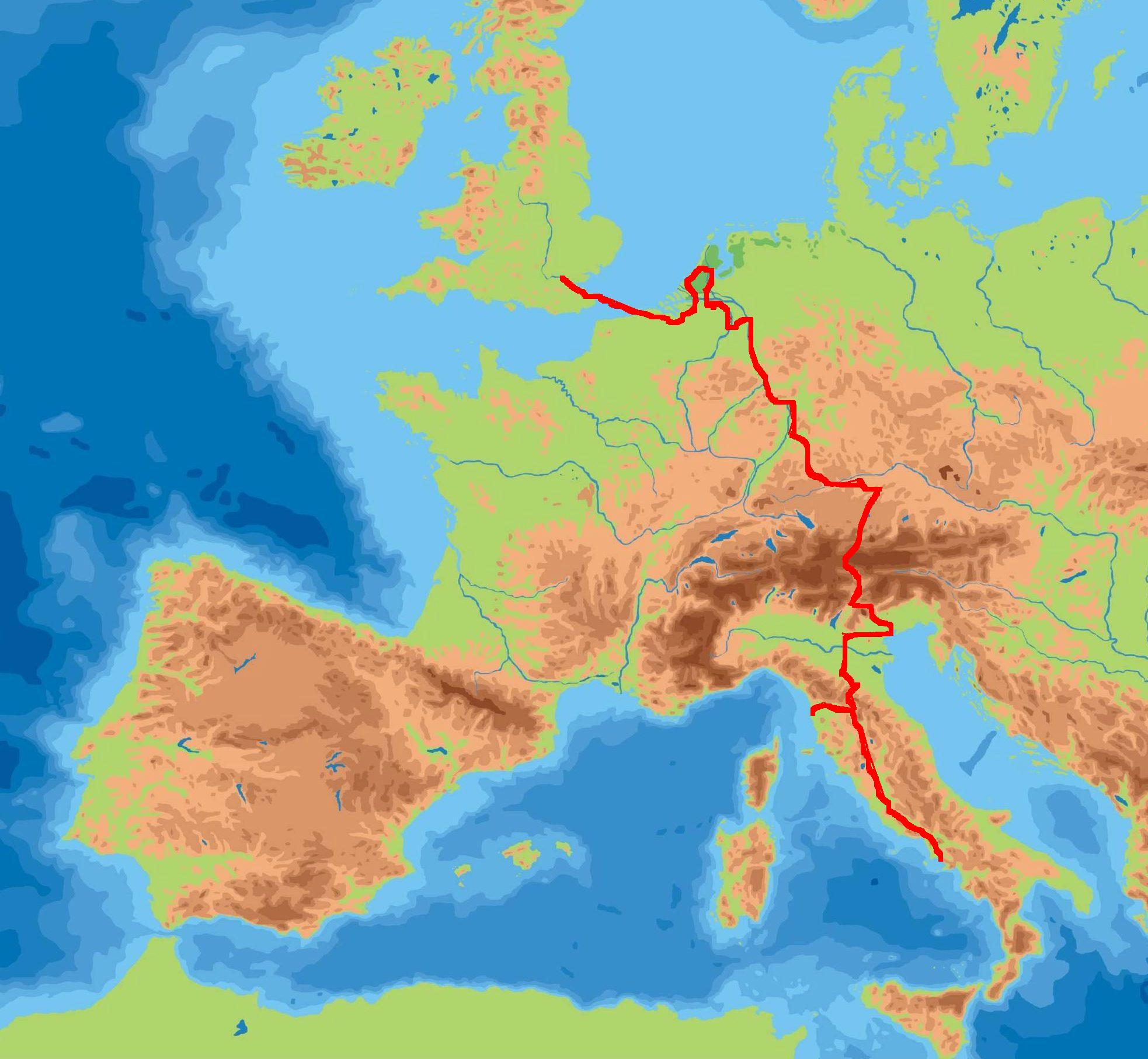
William Beckford's Grand Tour through Europe, shown in red

For many years Beckford was believed to have conducted a simultaneous affair with his cousin Peter's wife Louisa Pitt (c. 1755–1791).

Having studied under Sir William Chambers and Cozens, Beckford journeyed in Italy in 1782 (the Grand Tour) and wrote a book about his travels: Dreams, Waking Thoughts and Incidents (1783). Soon came his best-known work, the Gothic novel Vathek (1786), written originally in French; he boasted that it took a single sitting of three days and two nights, though there is reason to believe that this was a flight of imagination.

His other main writings were Memoirs of Extraordinary Painters (1780), a satirical work, and Letters from Italy with Sketches of Spain and Portugal (1834), with brilliant descriptions of scenes and manners. In 1793 he visited Portugal, where he settled for a while, and conducted an affair with a young male musician called Gregorio Franchi.

Following an appeal in 1817 by legal philosopher Jeremy Bentham that Beckford collaborate with him in advocating for the abolition of the death penalty for sodomy, Beckford may also have been the author, or one of the authors, of Don Leon, a poetic tract of homosexual advocacy.

Beckford's fame, however, rests as much on his eccentricities as a builder and collector as on his literary efforts. In undertaking his buildings he managed to dissipate his fortune, which was estimated by his contemporaries to give him an income of £100,000 a year. The loss of one of his Jamaican sugar plantations to James Beckford Wildman was particularly costly. Only £80,000 of his capital remained at his death.

== Art collection ==
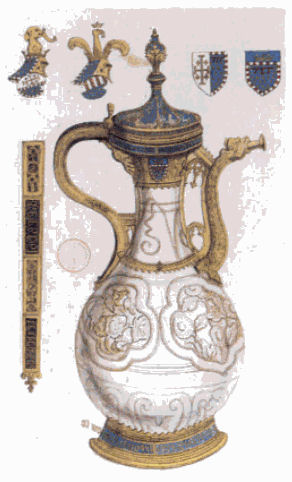
The Fonthill vase, of Chinese Jingdezhen porcelain but adorned with metallic mounts in Europe, was the earliest piece of Chinese porcelain documented to reach Europe, in 1338. It was once in the possession of William Beckford. It is now in the National Museum of Ireland.

Beckford was a compulsive and restless collector, who also frequently sold works, sometimes later repurchasing them. His collection was notable for its many Italian Quattrocento paintings, then little collected and relatively inexpensive. Despite his interest in Romantic medievalism, he owned few medieval works, though many from the Renaissance. He was also interested in showy Asian objects such as Mughal hardstone carvings. Although he avoided the classical marbles typically sought by well-educated English collectors, much of his collection was of 18th-century French furniture and decorative arts, then priced enormously high compared with paintings, by modern standards. He bought a single Turner in 1800, when the artist was only 25 (The Fifth Plague of Egypt, £157.10s), in 1828 William Blake's drawings for Thomas Gray's Elegy, and several works by Richard Parkes Bonington, but in general he preferred older works.

By 1822 Beckford was short of funds and in debt. He put Fonthill Abbey up for sale, for which 72,000 copies of Christie's illustrated catalogue were sold at a guinea apiece; the pre-sale view filled every farmhouse in the neighbourhood with visitors from London. Fonthill, with part of his collection, was sold before the sale for £330,000 to John Farquhar, who had made a fortune selling gunpowder in India.

Farquhar at once auctioned the art and furnishings in the "Fonthill sale" of 1823, at which Beckford and his son-in-law, the Duke of Hamilton, bought much, often more cheaply than the first price Beckford had paid, as the market was somewhat depressed. What remained of the collection, as maintained and added to at Lansdown Tower, amounting virtually to a second collection, was inherited by the Dukes of Hamilton. Much of that was dispersed in the "Hamilton Palace sale" of 1882, one of the major sales of the century.

The Fonthill sale precipitated William Hazlitt's scathing review of Beckford's taste for "idle rarities and curiosities or mechanical skill," fine bindings, bijouterie and highly finished paintings, "the quintessence and rectified spirit of still-life", republished in Hazlitt's Sketches of the Picture Galleries of England (1824), and richly demonstrating his own prejudices. Beckford pieces are now in museums all over the world. Hazlitt was unaware that the sale had been salted with lots inserted by Phillips the auctioneer that had never passed Beckford's muster: "I would not disgrace my house by Chinese furniture," he remarked later in life. "Horace Walpole would not have suffered it in his toyshop at Strawberry Hill".

=== Works owned by Beckford ===
Now in the National Gallery, London:

- Saint Catherine of Alexandria; the National Gallery paid c £6,000 in 1839, as part of a bulk purchase from Beckford.
- Agony in the Garden, bought at the Joshua Reynolds sale in 1795 for £5, sold with Fonthill and repurchased by Beckford at the Fonthill Sale (as a Mantegna) for £52.10s.
- Portrait of Doge Leonardo Loredan, Giovanni Bellini, bought 1807, 13 guineas, sold to NG in 1844 for £630.
- Exhumation of Saint Hubert, Rogier van der Weyden and workshop, bought by Beckford in 1802 for £96.12s, by NG in 1868 for £1,500.
- Philip IV in Brown and Silver by Diego Velázquez, bought by NG for £6,300 at the 1882 Hamilton Palace Sale, a very high price for a Spanish painting at the time.
- Tuccia and Sophonisba, Andrea Mantegna, £1,785 the pair in 1882
- Adoration of the Magi, Filippino Lippi, £1,227 in 1882
- The Poulterer's Shop, Gerrit Dou
- Circumcision, Luca Signorelli, £3,150, 1882.
- St Jerome in a Landscape, Cima da Conegliano
- Virgin and Child with St John, Perugino.
- Crucifixion Altarpiece Jacopo di Cione or "Style of Orcagna", the principal Trecento work in the collection.

Now in the Frick Collection:

- Claude Lorrain, The Sermon on the Mount, inherited from his father, c. 1656.
- Gentile Bellini, Doge Giovanni Mocenigo

Other collections:

- the "Altieri Claudes", now at Anglesey Abbey, "The Father of Psyche Sacrificing at the Temple of Apollo", 1663 and "The Landing of Aeneas" painted in 1675. A famous index of taste, as they were auctioned from the estate of the Duke of Kent in 1947 for only £5,300 in 1947 and bought by Lord Fairhaven for Anglesey Abbey, when Beckford had paid £6,825 in 1799, and sold them in £10,500 in 1808 and Philip John Miles paid £12,000 for them in 1813 to hang them at Leigh Court, making them among the most expensive paintings of the day.

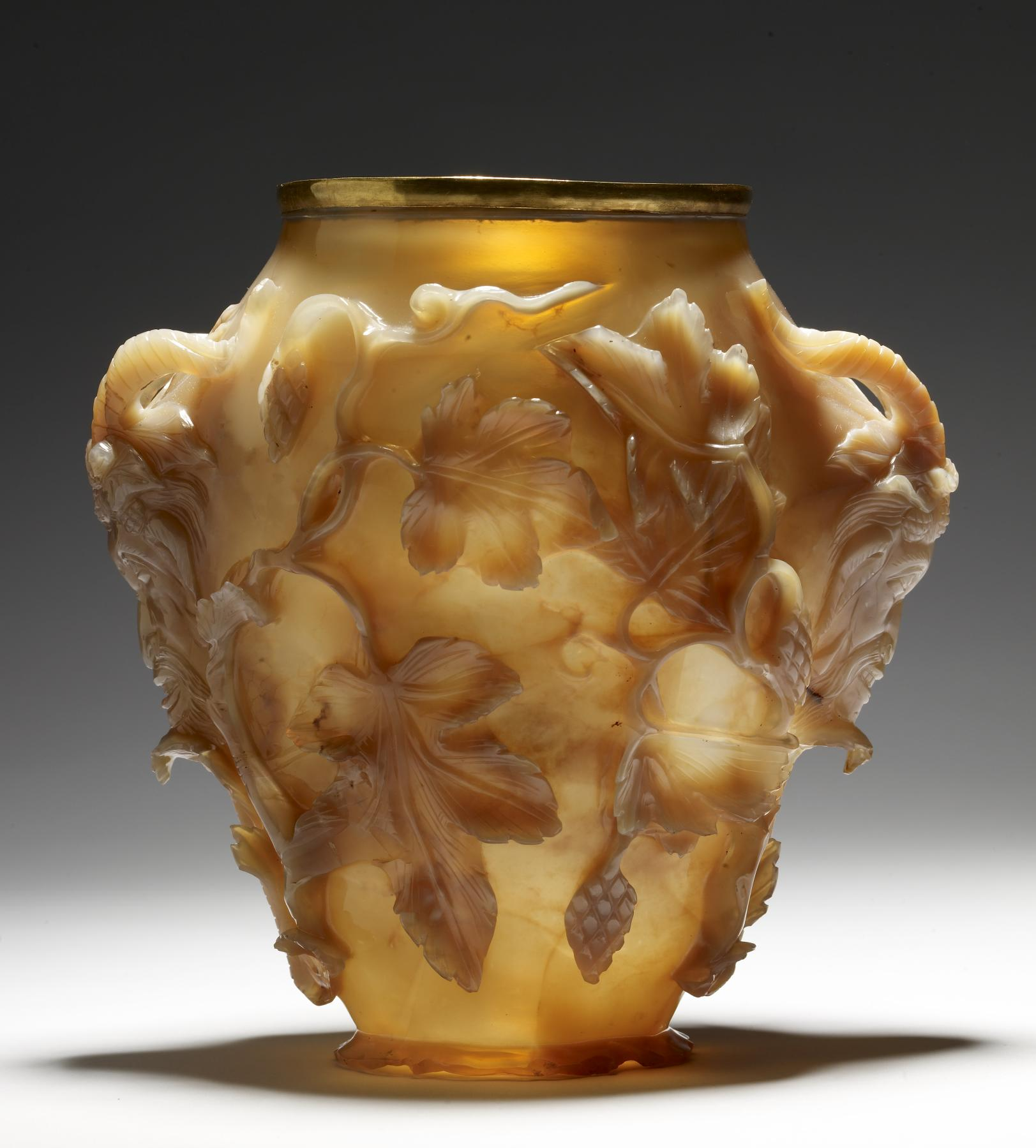
The Rubens Vase

- The Fonthill Vase, a 14th-century Chinese porcelain vase which is the earliest known piece of Chinese porcelain to arrive in Europe, where it was given 14th century metal mounts. Now in the National Museum of Ireland.
- Other works are in the Metropolitan Museum of Art, New York (Pesellino Madonna and Child with Six Saints attributed by Beckford to Fra Angelico; Giovanni Bellini, Virgin and Child, attributed by Beckford to Cima da Conegliano; Benjamin West, commemorative portraits of Beckford's grandparents, commissioned in 1797 for Fonthill Abbey, the 13th-century Malmesbury Abbey Limoges champlevé enamel chasse, a matching commode and secretaire made by Jean-Henri Riesener for Marie Antoinette, and two from the 400-piece Meissen porcelain table service for the Prince of Orange, ca 1770; the National Gallery of Art Washington (Bronzino, Eleanor of Toledo), Wallace Collection (Canaletto & Corneille de Lyon), Getty Museum (Gerrit Dou, Astronomer by Candlelight). Walters Art Museum (the Byzantine agate Rubens Vase), Huntington Library and Art Gallery George Romney portrait of Beckford as a young man and his double portrait of Beckford's daughters).
- The growing database of The National Inventory Research Project (NIRP) involving The National Inventory of Continental European Paintings (NICE or NICEP) lists 20 other works from the collection in various other UK public collections.

== Fonthill Abbey ==
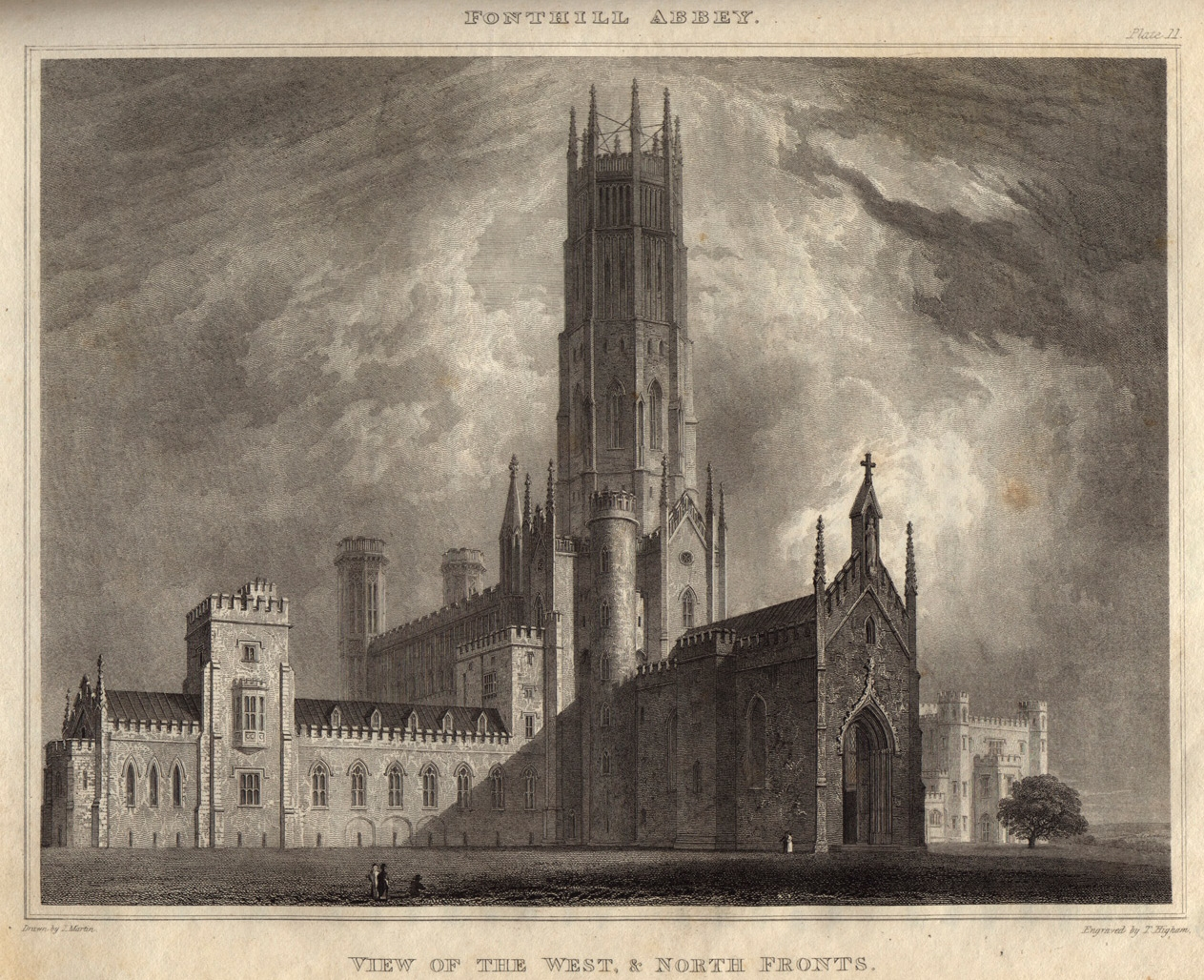
Fonthill Abbey designed for William Beckford by the architect James Wyatt. Print from John Rutter's Delineations of Fonthill and its Abbey (1823).

The opportunity to purchase the complete library of Edward Gibbon gave Beckford the basis for his own library, and James Wyatt built Fonthill Abbey in which to house this and the owner's art collection. Lord Nelson visited Fonthill Abbey with the Hamiltons in 1800. The house was completed in 1807. Beckford entered parliament as member for Wells and later for Hindon, quitting by taking the Chiltern Hundreds; but he lived mostly in seclusion, spending much of his father's wealth without adding to it.

In 1822 he sold Fonthill, and a large part of his art collection, to John Farquhar for £330,000 and moved to Bath, where he bought No. 20 Lansdown Crescent and No. 1 Lansdown Place West, joining them with a one-storey arch thrown across a driveway. In 1836 he also bought Nos. 18 and 19 Lansdown Crescent (leaving No 18 empty to ensure peace and quiet).

Most of Fonthill Abbey collapsed under the weight of its poorly built tower on the night of 21 December 1825. The wreckage was slowly removed, leaving only a fragment that survives as a private home. This is the first part, which included the shrine to St Anthony, Beckford's patron when he was living in Lisbon.

== Lansdown Crescent and Lansdown Tower (Beckford's Tower) ==
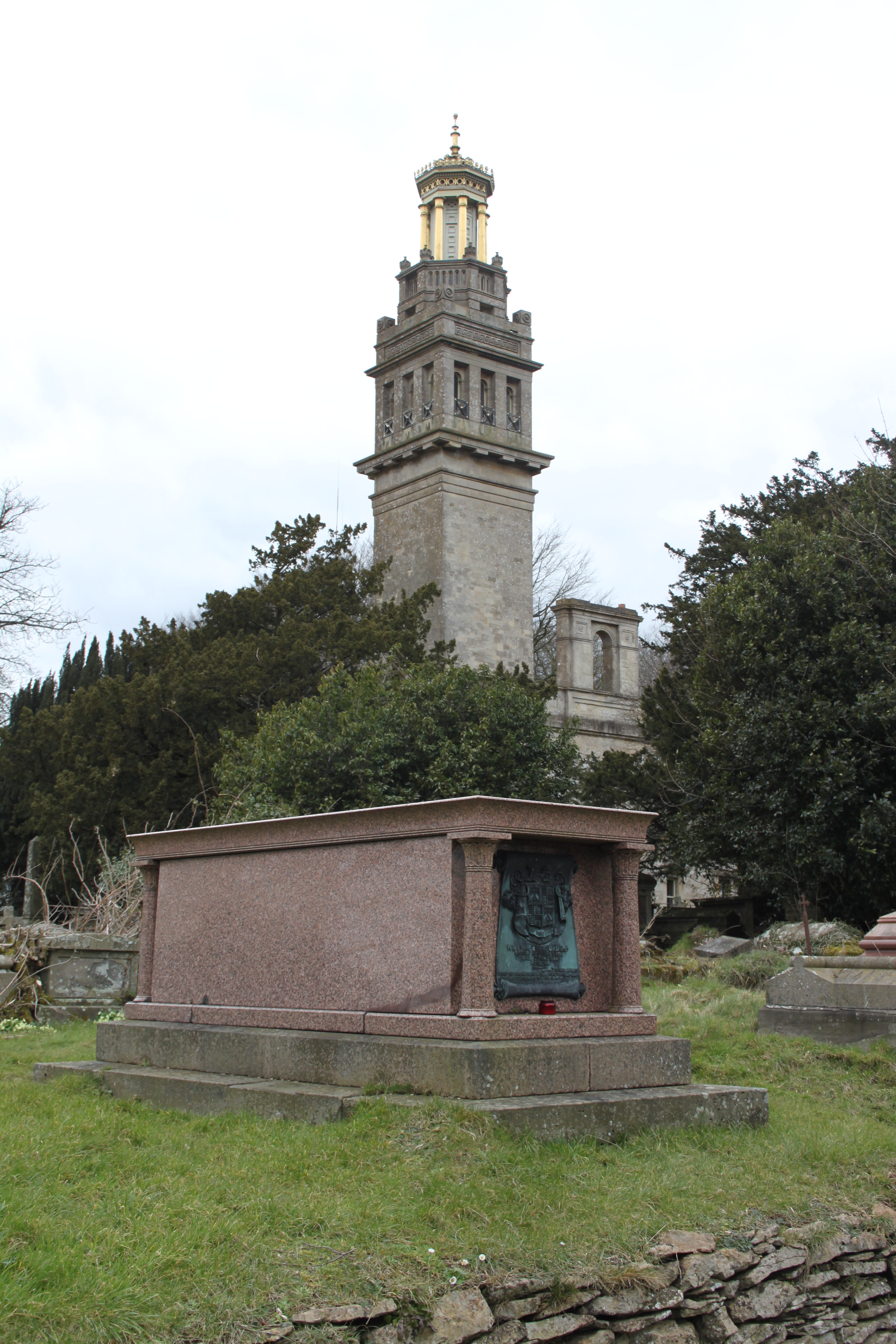
Beckford's tomb with the tower in the background

Beckford spent his later years in his home at Lansdown Crescent, Bath, during which time he commissioned architect Henry Goodridge to design a spectacular folly at the northern end of his land on Lansdown Hill: Lansdown Tower, now known as Beckford's Tower, in which he kept many of his treasures. The tower is now owned by the Bath Preservation Trust and managed by the Beckford Tower Trust as a museum to William Beckford; part of the property is rented to the Landmark Trust which makes it available for public hire as a spectacular holiday home.

The museum contains numerous engravings and chromolithographs of the Tower's original interior as well as furniture commissioned specifically for the Tower by Beckford and gradually reassembled through the efforts of the Bath Preservation Trust and others. There is also a great deal of information at the Tower about Beckford, including objects related to his life in Bath, at Fonthill and elsewhere.

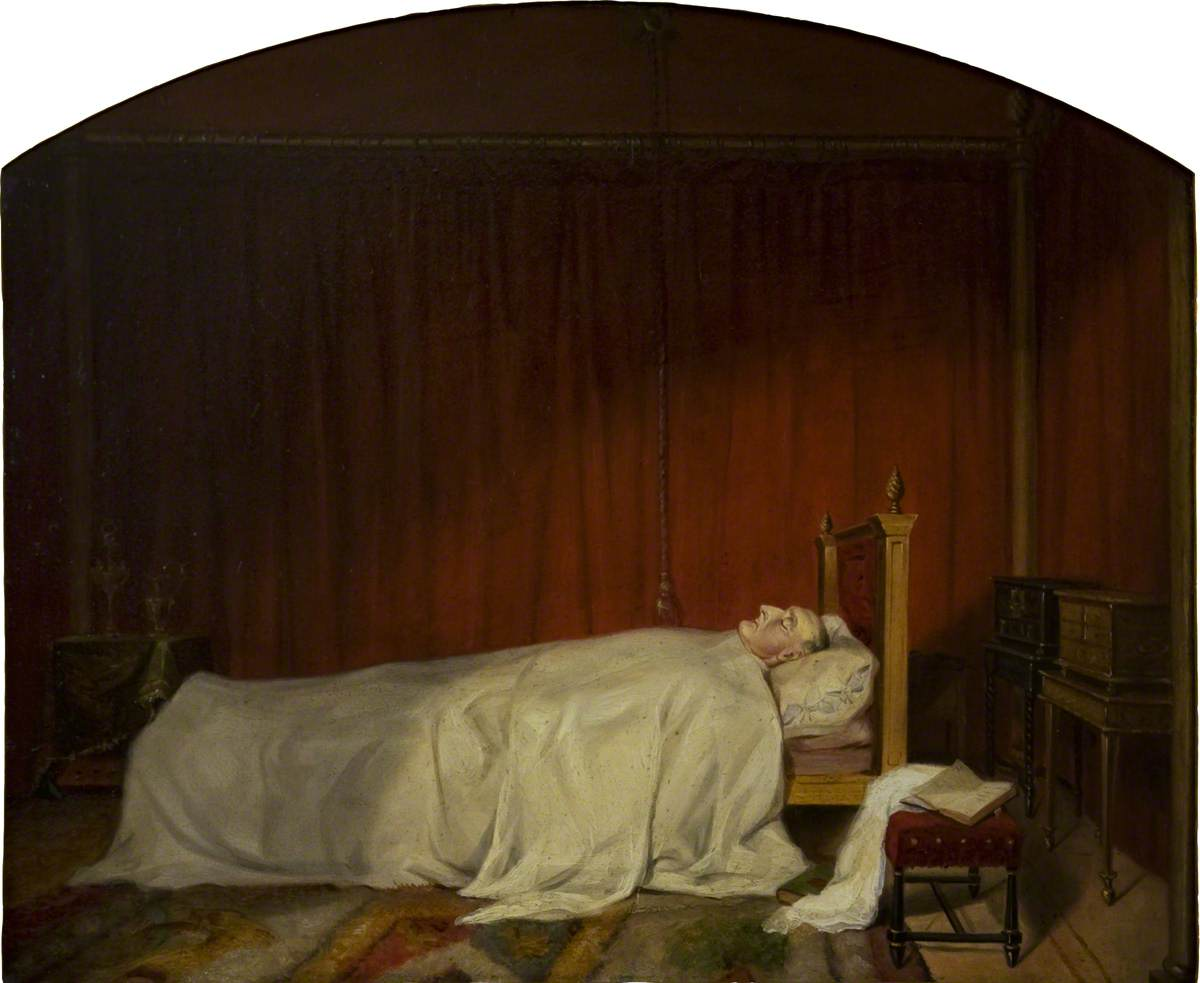
Willis Maddox, William Beckford on his Deathbed

After his death at Lansdown Crescent on 2 May 1844, aged 84, his body was laid in a sarcophagus and placed on an artificial mound, as was the custom of Saxon kings from whom he claimed to be descended. Beckford had wished to be buried in the grounds of Lansdown Tower, but his body was interred at Bath Abbey Cemetery in Lyncombe Vale on 11 May 1844 (accessible from Ralph Allen Drive). The Tower was sold to a local publican who turned it into a beer garden. Eventually it was bought back by Beckford's younger daughter, Susan Hamilton, Duchess of Hamilton, who gave the land round it to Walcot parish for consecration as a cemetery in 1848. This allowed Beckford's remains to be reinterred near the Tower he loved.

Beckford's self-designed tomb, a massive sarcophagus of polished pink granite with bronze armorial plaques, now stands on a hillock in the cemetery surrounded by an oval ditch. On one side is a quotation from Vathek: "Enjoying humbly the most precious gift of heaven to man – Hope", and on another lines from his poem, A Prayer: "Eternal Power! Grant me, through obvious clouds one transient gleam of thy bright essence in my dying hour."

Henry Goodridge designed a Byzantine entrance gateway to the cemetery, flanked by bronze railings which had surrounded Beckford's original tomb in Bath Abbey Cemetery.

Walcot Cemetery is closed for burials but still open to the public, as is the Tower on regular days in the year. (See the Bath Preservation Trust website.)

== Other works ==
As a writer, Beckford is remembered for Vathek, of which the reception from every quarter may have satisfied his ambitions for a career in belles-lettres, and for his travel memoir, Italy: with some Sketches of Spain and Portugal, published fifty years after his Grand Tour, as an old man looking back on his youth. He followed Vathek with two parodies of current cultural fashions, the formulaic sentimental novel, in Modern Novel Writing, or, The Elegant Enthusiast (1796) and Azemia, a satire on the Minerva Press novels, written as "Jacquetta Agneta Mariana Jenks, of Belgrove Priory in Wales"; and also published Biographical Memoirs of Extraordinary Painters (1780), a literary prank burlesquing serious biographical encyclopaedias. Towards the end of his life he published collected travel letters, under the title Recollections of an Excursion to the Monasteries of Alcobaca and Batalha (1835), the memoir of a trip made in 1794.

- Beckford, William (1834). Italy, with sketches of Spain and Portugal. 1.
- Beckford, William (1834). Italy, with sketches of Spain and Portugal. 2.

== Legacy ==
Beckford left two daughters, the younger of whom (Susanna Euphemia, sometimes called Susan) was married to Alexander Hamilton, 10th Duke of Hamilton, and inherited the majority of his collection, which was then moved north to Hamilton Palace, now demolished. The elder, Margaret Maria Elizabeth Beckford, married Lt-Gen. James Orde.

Beckford was portrayed by Daniel Massey in the 1982 Central Television production I Remember Nelson, and has been the subject of several biographies in recent decades.

Beckford wrote a considerable amount of music, much of it with the assistance of his amanuensis, John Burton, with whom he collaborated on his largest composition: Arcadian Pastoral. The music manuscripts, which had lain among Beckford's effects at Hamilton Palace, were bought and presented to Basil Blackwell as a leaving present. He in turn bequeathed them to the Bodleian Library. In 1998, Michael Maxwell Steer edited and published all Beckford's music, including the collection of Modinhas Brasileiras which had been copied for him during his stay at Sintra in 1787. These are particularly interesting as they are the second surviving example of this Portuguese song form. The edition is available in six volumes from The Beckford Edition. It can be consulted in the Bodleian, and elsewhere.

== Cultural references ==
According to Ernest Hartley Coleridge, Beckford is the person referred to in Lord Byron's short poem "To Dives – A Fragment". Byron describes a person of great wealth, "of Wit, in Genius, as in Wealth the first", who feels "Wrath's vial on thy lofty head burst" when he is "seduced to deeds accurst" and "smitten with th' unhallowed thirst of Crime unnamed". Byron also refers to him in Childe Harold, Canto I, stanza 22.

In 1974, Aubrey Menen published Fonthill: A Comedy, a satirical portrait of Beckford.

== See also ==
- List of horror fiction authors

== Sources ==
- "Davies": National Gallery Catalogues: Catalogue of the Earlier Italian Schools, Martin Davies, National Gallery Catalogues, London 1961, reprinted 1986, ISBN 0-901791-29-6
- Getty Provenance Research databases (Public collections etc.)
- Reitlinger, Gerald; The Economics of Taste, Vol I: The Rise and Fall of Picture Prices 1760–1960, Barrie and Rockliffe, London, 1961
- Cousin, John William (1910), "Beckford, William", A Short Biographical Dictionary of English Literature, London: J. M. Dent & Sons – via Wikisource
- Chisholm, Hugh, ed. (1911). "Beckford, William" . Encyclopædia Britannica. Vol. 3 (11th ed.). Cambridge University Press.
- Garnett, Richard (1885). "Beckford, William (1759–1844)" . In Stephen, Leslie (ed.). Dictionary of National Biography. Vol. 4. London: Smith, Elder & Co.
- McConnell, Anita. "Beckford, William Thomas (1760–1844)". Oxford Dictionary of National Biography (online ed.). Oxford University Press. doi:10.1093/ref:odnb/1905. (Subscription, Wikipedia Library access or UK public library membership required.)
- Ostergard, Derek E., ed. (2001). William Beckford 1760–1844: An Eye for the Magnificent. Yale University Press. ISBN 978-0-30009068-0.
