= George Pitt-Rivers, 4th Baron Rivers =

British peer and politician (1810–1866)

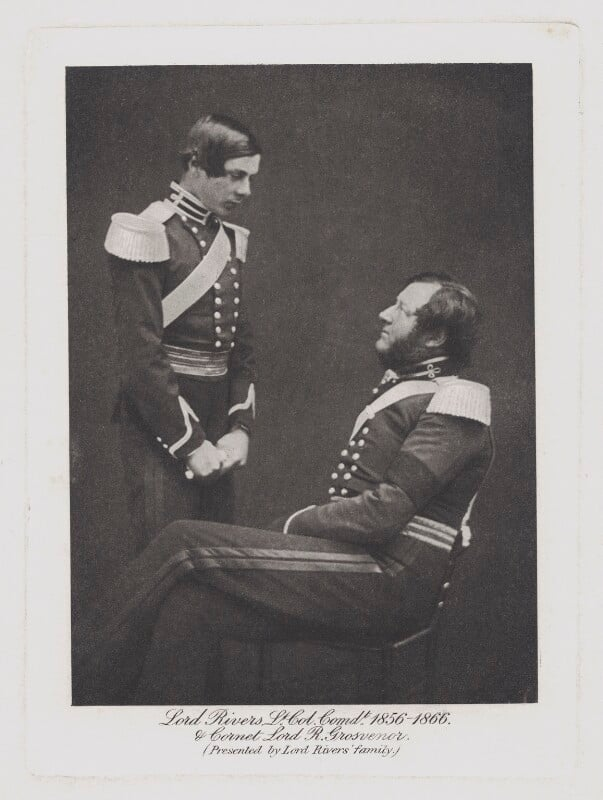
Rivers (seated) beside Richard Grosvenor, 1st Baron Stalbridge, 1850s

George Pitt-Rivers, 4th Baron Rivers (16 July 1810 – 28 April 1866), known as George Beckford until 1828, was a British peer and politician. He held a place as a Lord-in-waiting in several governments, migrating from the Tory to the Liberal Party over the course of his career. He commanded the Dorsetshire Yeomanry Cavalry for a decade. His four sons all suffered from a lung disease, and only the youngest briefly survived him to inherit the barony.

== Background ==
Born George Beckford, Lord Rivers was the elder son of Horace Pitt-Rivers, 3rd Baron Rivers. He was educated at Harrow School from 1821 to 1826, and matriculated at Christ Church, Oxford on 5 June 1828. He took the surname of Pitt in November 1828 after his father inherited the Pitt estates and, by special remainder, the title of Baron Rivers from his maternal uncle, George Pitt, 2nd Baron Rivers.

== Political career ==
Lord Rivers succeeded in the barony on the death of his father in 1831 and took his seat in the House of Lords. He adopted the surname of Pitt-Rivers upon inheriting the estate. Initially a Tory, he served as a Lord-in-waiting under Sir Robert Peel from 1841 to 1846. On 12 February 1846, he was commissioned lieutenant-colonel of the Dorsetshire Yeomanry Cavalry, and was lieutenant-colonel commandant of the unit from 25 July 1856 until his death. He was later a Lord-in-Waiting in Lord Aberdeen's coalition government from 1853 to 1855 and in the Whig administrations of Lord Palmerston and Lord Russell from 1855 to 1858 and again from 1859 to 1866.

On 26 February 1859, he was granted a patent for an improved plow.

== Family ==
Lord Rivers married Lady Susan Georgiana Leveson-Gower, daughter of Granville Leveson-Gower, 1st Earl Granville, on 2 February 1833 at the British Embassy in Paris. They had four sons and nine daughters; all of the sons died of a lung disease before their majorities. These were:

- George Horace Pitt (20 March 1834 – 20 December 1850)
- Susan Harriet Pitt (28 May 1835 – 27 June 1920), married Edmund Oldfield on 30 July 1872
- Fanny Georgiana Pitt (26 December 1836 – 26 October 1896), Lady of the Bedchamber to Alexandra, Princess of Wales, married George Osborne, 9th Duke of Leeds on 16 January 1861
- Granville Beckford Pitt (26 July 1838 – 20 August 1855)
- Blanche Caroline Pitt (20 June 1840 – 28 August 1914)
- Alice Charlotte Pitt (27 December 1841 – 21 June 1865), married Col. William Arbuthnot on 26 April 1865, killed by lightning while climbing the Schilthorn
- Mary Emma Pitt (7 October 1843 – 13 October 1900), Maid of Honour to Queen Victoria, married Rev. Philip Frank Eliot in 1883
- William Frederick Pitt (21 October 1845 – 8 July 1859)
- Margaret Grace Pitt (24 May 1847 – 21 April 1926), married Rev. William Page Roberts in 1878
- Henry Peter Pitt-Rivers, 5th Baron Rivers (1849–1867)
- Marcia Louisa Pitt (21 August 1850 – 18 October 1850)
- Gertrude Emily Pitt (18 February 1852 – aft. 1922)
- Constance Elizabeth Pitt (24 June 1854 – 2 June 1875)

He died in April 1866, aged 55, and was succeeded in the barony by his fourth but only surviving son, Henry.

Military offices
Preceded by The Earl of Ilchester	Lieutenant-Colonel Commandant of the Dorsetshire Yeomanry (Queen's Own); 1856–1866	Succeeded by The Lord Digby
Peerage of the United Kingdom
Preceded by Horace Pitt-Rivers	Baron Rivers; 1831–1866	Succeeded by Henry Pitt-Rivers
