= Cuthbert Ellison (British Army officer) =

British soldier and politician (1698–1785)

General Cuthbert Ellison
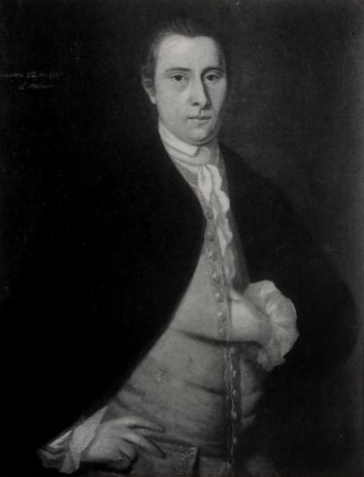
- Portrait of Ellison by an unknown artist
- Born: 10 May 1698
- Died: 11 October 1785 (aged 87)
- Military career
- Allegiance: Kingdom of Great Britain
- Branch: British Army
- Service years: c. 1723–1785
- Rank: General
- Conflicts: War of the Austrian Succession; Battle of Dettingen; Jacobite rising of 1745
- Other work: Member of Parliament for Shaftesbury

General Cuthbert Ellison (10 May 1698 – 11 October 1785) was a British Army officer who also served as Member of Parliament for Shaftesbury. He joined the army in around 1723 and began a long period of service in Ireland, where on top of his regimental duties he served as aide de camp to two Lords Lieutenant of Ireland. Promoted to lieutenant-colonel in 1739, Ellison fought with the 23rd Regiment of Foot at the Battle of Dettingen in 1743 before being invalided home in the following year. Having become a deputy adjutant general, Ellison failed to secure further promotion and continued to be beset by illness, and sold his regimental commissions in 1745. Despite this he continued in his post as an adjutant and was promoted to colonel in time to serve on the Duke of Cumberland's staff during the Jacobite rising. Ellison retired from the army after this and was elected to the parliamentary seat of Shaftesbury in 1747, which he held until 1754. Continuing to be promoted despite a lack of active service or interest in further advancement, Ellison became a general in 1772. A hypochondriac, he spent much of his retirement at Bath and died the second most senior general in the army in 1785.

== Military career ==
Cuthbert Ellison was born on 10 May 1698, the son of Robert Ellison (died 1726) of Hebburn and his wife Elizabeth, the daughter of Sir Henry Liddell, 3rd Baronet. (Note: His father's name is also recorded as Henry.) He was the grandson of politician Robert Ellison. Ellison joined the British Army in the early 1720s despite being his father's eldest son, because his family were in straitened circumstances due to debts accrued to Elizabeth's brother George Liddell. (Note: One of Ellison's younger brothers, Robert, joined the army as well and died in America while commanding the 44th Regiment of Foot in 1755.) He obtained a commission in the 8th Dragoons with the influence of his uncle, Sir Henry. He was promoted to captain in 1723 and in 1728 moved with his regiment to serve in Ireland, where he would spend the next twelve years. In 1730 he inherited the family Hebburn estate and became a landowner, but continued in the army. (Note: Ellison hardly ever visited Hebburn, preferring the socials hubs of the army and London, and gave the running of the estate over to his younger brother Henry.) He was promoted to major in 1731 and by 1733 was listed as a captain-major.

Later in the same year Ellison was seconded from his regiment to serve as an aide de camp to the Duke of Dorset, the Lord Lieutenant of Ireland. Ellison travelled widely throughout the countryside of Ireland in order to avoid having to pay the high living costs found in Dublin, and also frequently travelled to England to visit his colonel, Sir Adolphus Oughton, to recruit horses for his regiment, and to pay court on George II. These periods of official leave were augmented with occasional visits home to recover his health at spas, Ellison suffering throughout his life from a weak constitution. A popular officer, he used his family's influence to continue on as an aide de camp to the next Lord Lieutenant, the Duke of Devonshire, in 1737. Ellison was then promoted to lieutenant-colonel in 1739 when the War of Jenkins' Ear began, transferring to the 23rd Regiment of Foot on 23 November; despite receiving less pay in a regiment of foot, Ellison was pleased with his move because the 23rd were heavily supported by the king. He travelled back to England to join his new unit and spent 1740 in army camps at Windsor Forest, Newbury, and Marlborough.

At the end of the year Ellison and his regiment were sent to mainland Europe to fight in the War of the Austrian Succession, initially staying at Bruges. They were then sent to capture Ostend and Nieuport to ensure the security of other parts of the army then travelling to join them. Having completed these tasks Ellison went in to winter quarters at Ghent, with his regiment having been severely depleted through bad weather, long marches and sickness. He continued on the continent after this and saw action at the Battle of Dettingen on 27 June 1743, where the army fought to relieve French pressure on their allied forces; by October his regiment only had seven healthy officers, including himself, with which to operate. Soon after this Ellison took up post as a deputy adjutant general to Field Marshal Lord Stair, the Commander-in-Chief of the Forces. Later in the year the colonel of the 23rd died of wounds he had received at Dettingen; while Ellison was his natural successor as lieutenant-colonel of the regiment, his position as adjutant-general meant he was bypassed because his duties were seen as too important. By this point Ellison also held a commission as lieutenant-colonel of the 6th Dragoons, dated from 19 April, and his exact regimental position after Dettingen is unsure.

Ellison returned home from the continent in the summer of 1744 to recover at Bath from painful cramps and swellings in his limbs that had begun while on campaign; a hypochondriac, he attributed these difficulties to his weak constitution. In response to this and his difficulties in obtaining promotion, Ellison attempted to retire from the army but was not allowed to, his previous dealings with the king having given George such a positive opinion of Ellison that he refused to let him go. Instead Ellison chose to sell his regimental commissions in the 6th and 23rd, which he did for £3,500 to Sir John Whitefoord on 19 March.

== Post-regimental life ==
Ellison was then promoted to colonel and served as adjutant-general on the staff of the Duke of Cumberland during the Jacobite rising of 1745, despite holding no regimental rank and receiving no pay for his efforts. He was mostly employed preparing camps for the army in advance of its arrival, by 7 December being situated at Coventry. The rebellion was Ellison's last active service with the army, and after this he was nominated to run in the election for the parliamentary seat of Shaftesbury. Despite expecting the election to be "dubious, troublesome and very expensive", in 1747 Ellison succeeded in winning it under the patronage of Lord Ilchester. He served in parliament until the 1754 general election when he chose not to stand again.

Despite no longer serving actively in the army, his appointment as a staff officer after selling his lieutenant-colonelcy meant that Ellison was still listed as an officer, and through seniority he was promoted to major-general in 1755. He was then advanced to lieutenant-general in 1759 under the express orders of George II, but Ellison found little interest in his promotion, writing that "the rank is of consequence to an able and healthful man but 'tis none to me who have been fitter for an hospital than the field". Continuing his hypochondriac ways, Ellison spent much of his retirement at Bath in the expectation that he would be brought down with gout, while also maintaining a house in London. He was promoted to general in 1772 and died on 11 October 1785, unmarried, at the time being the second most senior general in the army. Over 200 of Ellison's letters from throughout his life are preserved in Gateshead Public Library.

== Notes and citations ==
=== Citations ===
Parliament of Great Britain
Preceded by Peter Walter; George Pitt	Member of Parliament for Shaftesbury; 1747–1754; With: George Pitt; William Beckford	Succeeded by James Brudenell; Sir Thomas Clavering
