= Baroness Lane-Fox =

Baroness Lane-Fox may refer to:

- Felicity Lane-Fox, Baroness Lane-Fox (1918–1988), Conservative life peer
- Martha Lane Fox, Baroness Lane-Fox of Soho (born 1973), British entrepreneur and crossbench life peer
