= Peter Beckford (MP) =

British writer and politician

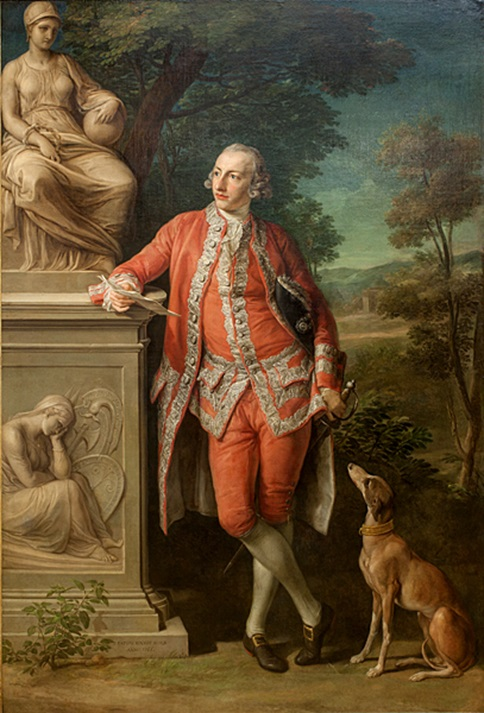
1766 portrait of Beckford by Pompeo Batoni

Sir Peter Beckford (c. 1740 – c. 1811) was a British writer and politician who represented Morpeth in the House of Commons of Great Britain from 1768 to 1774. He was also a patron of classical composer and pianist Muzio Clementi. A prominent member of the fox hunting community in England, he owned a pack of hunting dogs and wrote the work Thoughts upon Hunting (1781) which served as a guide to the practice.

== Biography ==
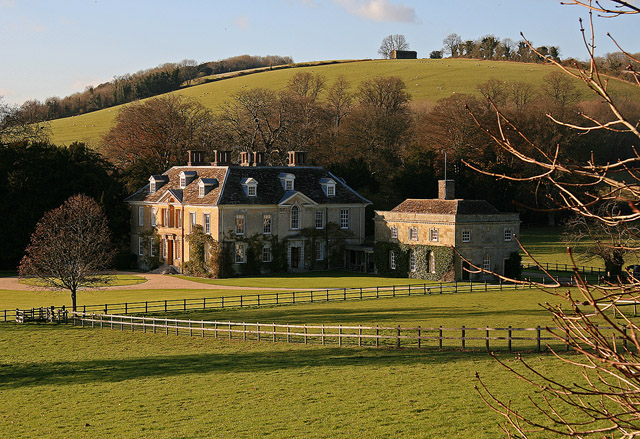
Stepleton House, Iwerne Steepleton, Dorset

Peter Beckford was born the only son of Julines Beckford of Iwerne Stepleton, Dorset in 1740. He was a nephew of William Beckford, Lord Mayor of the City of London, and cousin of William Thomas Beckford (1760–1844), author of the Gothic novel Vathek and builder of the folly Fonthill Abbey. In 1765, on the death of his father, Beckford inherited his estate at Stepleton House in the parish of Iwerne Stepleton near Blandford Forum in Dorset, and set out on his first visit to Italy. On the way he met Voltaire and Rousseau at Geneva, and hunted with the king of Sardinia.

In 1766 he visited Rome, where he was escorted by James Byres, bought several antiquities, and commissioned a modern portrait (probably the portrait of Beckford by Pompeo Batoni). There he was so impressed by the young Muzio Clementi's musical talent that he persuaded Clementi's father to let him take Clementi to his estate in Britain for seven years. Beckford agreed to provide quarterly payments to sponsor Muzio's musical education until the boy reached the age of 21. (Beckford himself claimed to have "bought Clementi from his father for a period of seven years".)

He became the Member of Parliament for Morpeth, Northumberland in 1768. On 22 March 1773 Beckford married Hon. Louisa Pitt (1754–1791), the daughter of the British diplomat and politician George Pitt, 1st Baron Rivers (1721–1803) and Penelope Atkins. Their first son was born on 9 September 1776 but survived only a few months; Beckford's first surviving son was Horace, born at Sudeley Castle on 2 December 1777.

Beckford was an enthusiastic hunter, and in 1781 published his Thoughts upon Hunting In a Series of Familiar Letters to a Friend. He also owned several slave plantations in the British colony of Jamaica. In 1783, on the deterioration of his wife's health, Beckford returned to Italy with his family. His wife and a young daughter died at Florence; and he returned to Britain in 1799. In 1805 he published his Familiar Letters from Italy to a Friend in England. He died in 1811, and is buried in Steepleton Iwerne church.

== Writings ==
- Familiar letters from Italy, to a friend in England (2 vols., 1805)
- Thoughts upon hunting : in a series of familiar letters to a friend, 1781
- Thoughts upon hunting, in a series of familiar letters to a friend, 1781
- Thoughts upon Hare and Fox Hunting, in a series of letters to a friend, 1781
- Thoughts on Fox Hunting, published 1791

Parliament of Great Britain
Preceded by Viscount Garlies; Sir Matthew White Ridley, Bt	Member of Parliament for Morpeth; 1768 – 1774; With: Sir Matthew White Ridley, Bt	Succeeded by Francis Eyre; Sir Matthew White Ridley, Bt
