= George Pitt, 2nd Baron Rivers =

British politician and militia officer and peer

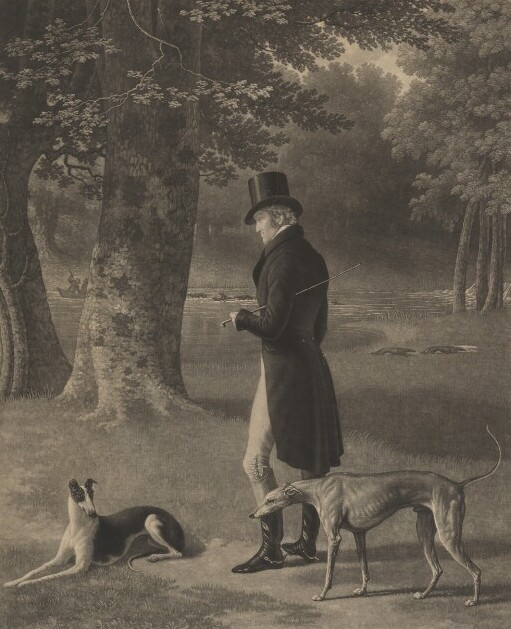
Lord Rivers in 1827

George Pitt, 2nd Baron Rivers (19 September 1751 – 20 July 1828) was a British politician and militia officer who represented Dorset in the House of Commons of Great Britain from 1774 to 1790.

Born in Angers, France, he was the only son of George Pitt, 1st Baron Rivers and his wife Penelope, daughter of Sir Henry Atkins, 4th Baronet of Clapham, Surrey. After completing his schooling, he spent several years on the European Continent. He lived in Naples during Sir William Hamilton's tenure as ambassador, and later became a member of the Neapolitan Club.

He succeeded his father as Member of Parliament for Dorset in the 1774 election, and like him, was consistently pro-administration. He came under fire at the county meeting before the 1780 election from supporters of the "economical reform" campaign, but was returned unopposed. After the fall of the North ministry, he voted in favour of Shelburne's peace proposals in 1783. He did not vote on the East India Bill which brought down the Fox-North Coalition, and was considered a supporter of his kinsman William Pitt's ministry in 1784. He did not stand in the 1790 election.

Pitt was commissioned into the Dorset Militia, of which his father was colonel of from 1757 to 1798. He was promoted from captain to major on 25 April 1790, second lieutenant-colonel on 25 June 1798, and first lieutenant-colonel shortly thereafter. He resigned his commission in late 1799. In 1803, he succeeded his father as Baron Rivers. He was a Lord of the Bedchamber from 1804 to 1819.

Candid miniature portrait of Princess Caroline (of Brunswick) painted by Eduard Stroely and dedicated to George Pitt Rivers ca. 1804

In his younger years, he was a dandy and an avid huntsman, keeping an excellent pack of greyhounds until 1825, when failing health forced him to abandon the sport. In 1800 he became the patron of the Swiss painter Jacques-Laurent Agasse, who made paintings of his greyhounds and horses.

He sold part of the family estates, those around Stratfield Saye House, to the nation in about 1814, so that it could be given to Arthur Wellesley, 1st Duke of Wellington as the gift of a grateful nation following his defeat of Napoleon. Around 1819 he bought the estate at Tollard Royal, Wiltshire, which remains in Pitt-Rivers ownership.

He died on 20 July 1828 in Grosvenor Place. Upon his death, the Barony of Rivers, of Stratfield Saye, created in 1776, became extinct, while the Barony of Rivers, of Sudeley Castle, created in 1802, passed by special remainder to his nephew Horace Beckford, who adopted the surname of Pitt-Rivers.

It seems probable that Pitt had a son by a woman known as 'Mrs Dean' (Patianse Dean, born 1749). Major General George Dean Pitt became Commander of the Military Forces in New Zealand and, the Lieut.-Governor of New Ulster (the North Island).

Parliament of Great Britain
Preceded by George Pitt; Humphry Sturt	Member of Parliament for Dorset; 1774–1790; With: Humphry Sturt 1774–1784; Francis John Browne	Succeeded by William Morton Pitt; Francis John Browne
Peerage of Great Britain
Preceded by George Pitt	Baron Rivers; 3rd creation 1803–1828	Extinct
Peerage of the United Kingdom
Preceded by George Pitt	Baron Rivers; 4th creation 1803–1828	Succeeded by Horace Pitt-Rivers
