= Horace Pitt-Rivers, 3rd Baron Rivers =

British peer and gambler (1777–1831)

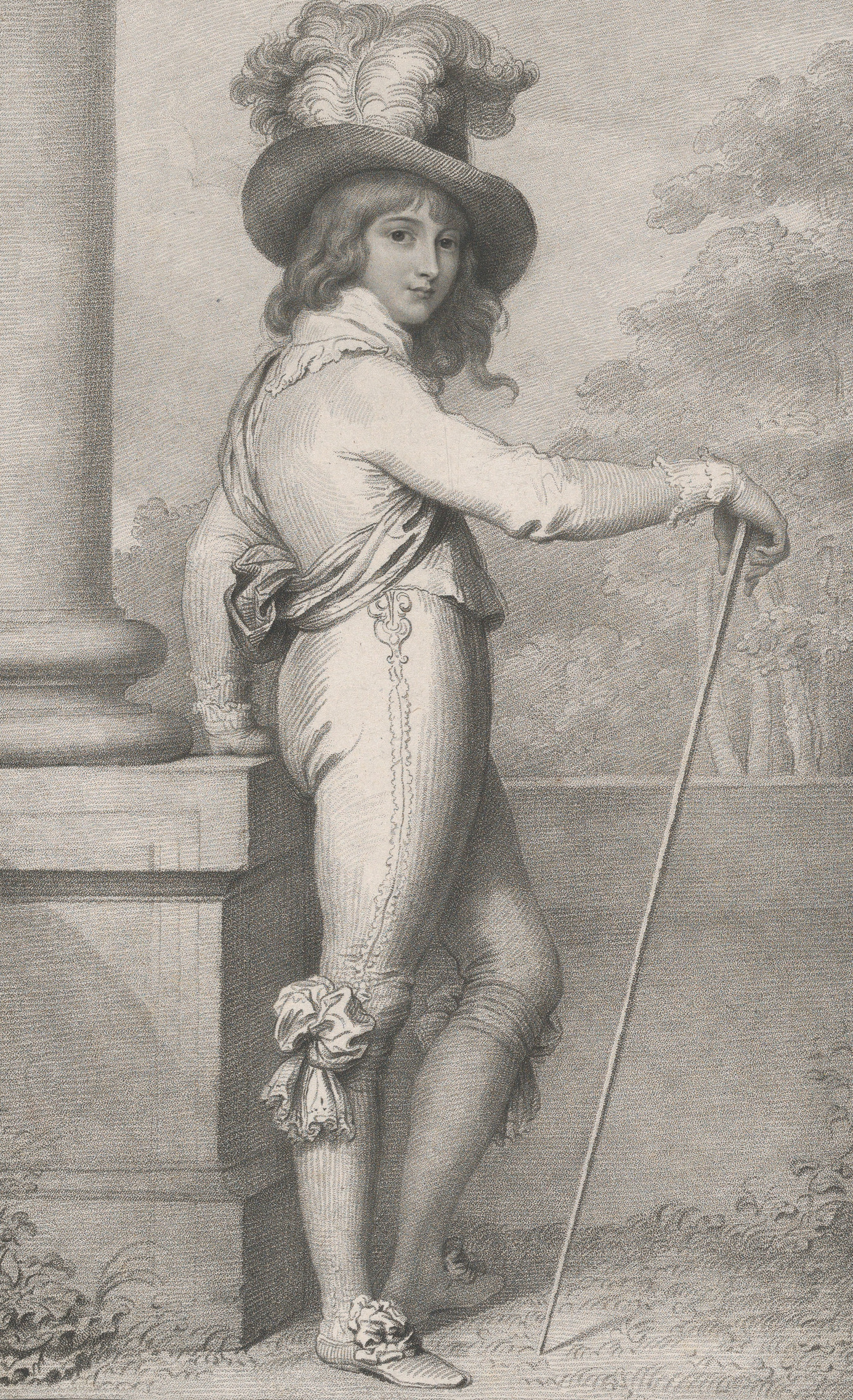
1793 portrait

William Horace Pitt-Rivers, 3rd Baron Rivers (2 December 1777 – 23 January 1831), known as Horace Beckford until 1828, was a British peer and gambler. The only son of Peter Beckford and Louisa Pitt who came of age, he married Frances Rigby on 9 February 1808, in the house of her father, Lieutenant-Colonel Francis Hale Rigby in Upper Grosvenor Street, London. They had four children:

- George Pitt-Rivers, 4th Baron Rivers (1810–1866)
- Horace Pitt-Rivers, 6th Baron Rivers (1814–1880)
- Fanny Pitt (d. 1 February 1836), married Frederick William Cox on 24 July 1834
- Harriet Elizabeth Pitt (1816 – 18 July 1876), maid of honour to Queen Victoria, married on 18 September 1841 Charles Dashwood Bruce (1802–1878), without issue

He succeeded his father in his estates in 1811, including his Jamaican slave plantations. As Horace Beckford, he was a notorious gambler and a member of Crockford's during the Regency era. His mania for high play was so pronounced that when his maternal uncle, George Pitt, 2nd Baron Rivers died on 20 July 1828, he left Beckford (who succeeded him in the title by special remainder) only £4,000 per year directly, leaving the bulk of his estate, worth £40,000 per year, in the hands of trustees for Horace's eldest son George. On 20 November, Horace assumed the name of Pitt-Rivers for himself and his successors in the Pitt estates, the rest of his issue to take the name of Pitt. He was a Tory in politics.

His godson and relative, Sir Horace Rumbold, recounted that he had left a bond with a close friend pledging neither to play cards or dice again, (Note: A pledge of this sort, dated 1807, is apparently to be found among the Beckford estate papers.) and upheld this for some years. However, in January 1831, he was persuaded by friends to gamble again, and lost a small sum of money. Despairing of controlling his addiction, he drowned himself in The Serpentine on 23 January 1831. Contemporary reports, by contrast, suggested his losses in his last game had been large. His widow died on 6 September 1860 at Rushmore Lodge, in Cranborne Chase, Dorset.

== Notes ==
Peerage of the United Kingdom
Preceded by George Pitt	Baron Rivers; 1828–1831	Succeeded by George Pitt-Rivers
