= Baron Darcy of Chiche =

Extinct barony in the Peerage of England

Baron Darcy of Chiche was a title in the Peerage of England.

== History ==
On 5 April 1551, courtier Sir Thomas Darcy was created Baron Darcy of Chiche so he could serve as Lord Chamberlain of the Household, also becoming a Knight Companion of the Order of the Garter later in the same year.

In 1613, a reversion of the barony was granted to Thomas Savage (later created Viscount Savage and son-in-law of the third baron) on the death of the third baron, with remainder to his male heirs. The third baron was created Viscount Colchester on 5 July 1621 and Earl Rivers on 4 November 1626, and on his death in 1640 the 1551 creation became extinct; the 1613 creation, viscountcy and earldom passed to Savage's son John, 2nd Viscount Savage. The titles became extinct upon the death of the 5th Earl in 1737.

== List of titleholders ==
=== Barons Darcy of Chiche (1551) ===
- Thomas Darcy, 1st Baron Darcy of Chiche (1506–1558)
- John Darcy, 2nd Baron Darcy of Chiche (died 1581), son of the 1st baron
- Thomas Darcy, 3rd Baron Darcy of Chiche (1565–1640) (created Viscount Colchester in 1621 and Earl Rivers in 1626)

=== Barons Darcy of Chiche (1613) ===
- Thomas Savage, 1st Viscount Savage, granted reversion 1613
- John, 2nd Viscount Savage, became Viscount Colchester and Earl Rivers, with 1613 barony, in 1640

== Family tree ==
Lane–Fox–Pitt–Rivers family tree

Thomas Darcy d. 1640; 1st Earl Rivers
Elizabeth Savage, Countess Rivers; 1581–1650	Thomas Savage d. 1635; 1st Viscount Savage
John Savage; 1603–1654; 2nd Earl Rivers
Richard Lane d. 1668; 1st Baronet	George Pitt d. 1694	Jane Savage d. 1676	Thomas Savage d. 1694; 3rd Earl Rivers	Richard Savage
George Lane c. 1620–1683; 1st Viscount Lanesborough	George Pitt d. 1735	Richard Savage d. 1712; 4th Earl Rivers	John Savage; 1665–1737; 5th Earl Rivers
James Lane; 1650–1724; 2nd Viscount Lanesborough	Robert Benson d. 1731; 1st Baron Bingley	Frances Lane d. 1674	Henry Fox; 1650-1719	George Pitt d. 1745
Baron Bingley, of Bingley in the County of York (2nd creation), 1763	Baron Rivers, of Stratfield Saye, Hampshire
Harriet Benson d. 1771	George Fox-Lane c. 1697–1773; 1st Baron Bingley	Sackville Fox d. 1760	George Pitt; 1721–1803; 1st Baron Rivers
Robert Lane; 1732–1768; 2nd Baron Bingley	James Fox-Lane; 1756–1821	Marcia Lucy Pitt; 1756–1822	George Pitt; 1751–1828; 2nd Baron Rivers	Louisa Pitt d. 1791	Peter Beckford; 1740–1811
Barony Bingley (2nd creation), extinct, 1768
George Lane-Fox; 1793–1848	William Augustus Pitt Lane-Fox; 1796–1832	Sackville Lane-Fox; 1797–1874	Horace Pitt-Rivers; 1777–1831; 3rd Baron Rivers
George Lane-Fox; 1816–1896	Augustus Pitt Rivers; 1827–1900	Sackville Lane-Fox; 1827–1888; 12th Baron Conyers	George Pitt-Rivers; 1810–1866; 4th Baron Rivers	Horace Pitt-Rivers; 1814–1880
James Thomas Richard Lane-Fox; 1841–1906	Alexander Edward Lane Fox-Pitt-Rivers; 1855–1927	St George Lane Fox-Pitt; 1856–1932	William Augustus Lane Fox-Pitt b. 1858	Douglas Fox-Pitt; 1864–1922	Marcia Pelham; 1863–1926; Countess of Yarborough	Violet Herbert; 1865–1929; Countess of Powis	Henry Pitt-Rivers; 1849–1867; 5th Baron Rivers
George Lane-Fox; 1870–1947; 1st Baron Bingley	Edward Lane-Fox; 1874–1949	Emily Rachel Forster d. 1979	George Pitt-Rivers; 1890–1966	Rosalind Pitt-Rivers; 1907–1990	William Augustus Fitzgerald Lane Fox-Pitt; 1896–1988
Francis Lane Fox; 1899–1989	Marcia Agnes Mary Lane-Fox; 1904–1980	James Henry Lane-Fox b. 1912	Felicity Lane-Fox; 1918–1988; Baroness Lane-Fox	Michael Pitt-Rivers; 1917–1999	Julian Pitt-Rivers; 1919–2001	George Anthony Lane-Fox Pitt-Rivers b. 1932	Valerie Pitt-Rivers b. 1939	William Oliver Lane Fox-Pitt; 1932–2012
George Francis Lane Fox; 1931–2012	Robin Lane Fox b. 1946	William Fox-Pitt b. 1969
Edward Lane Fox b. 1976	Martha Lane Fox b. 1973
