= Earl Rivers =

Title in the Peerage of England

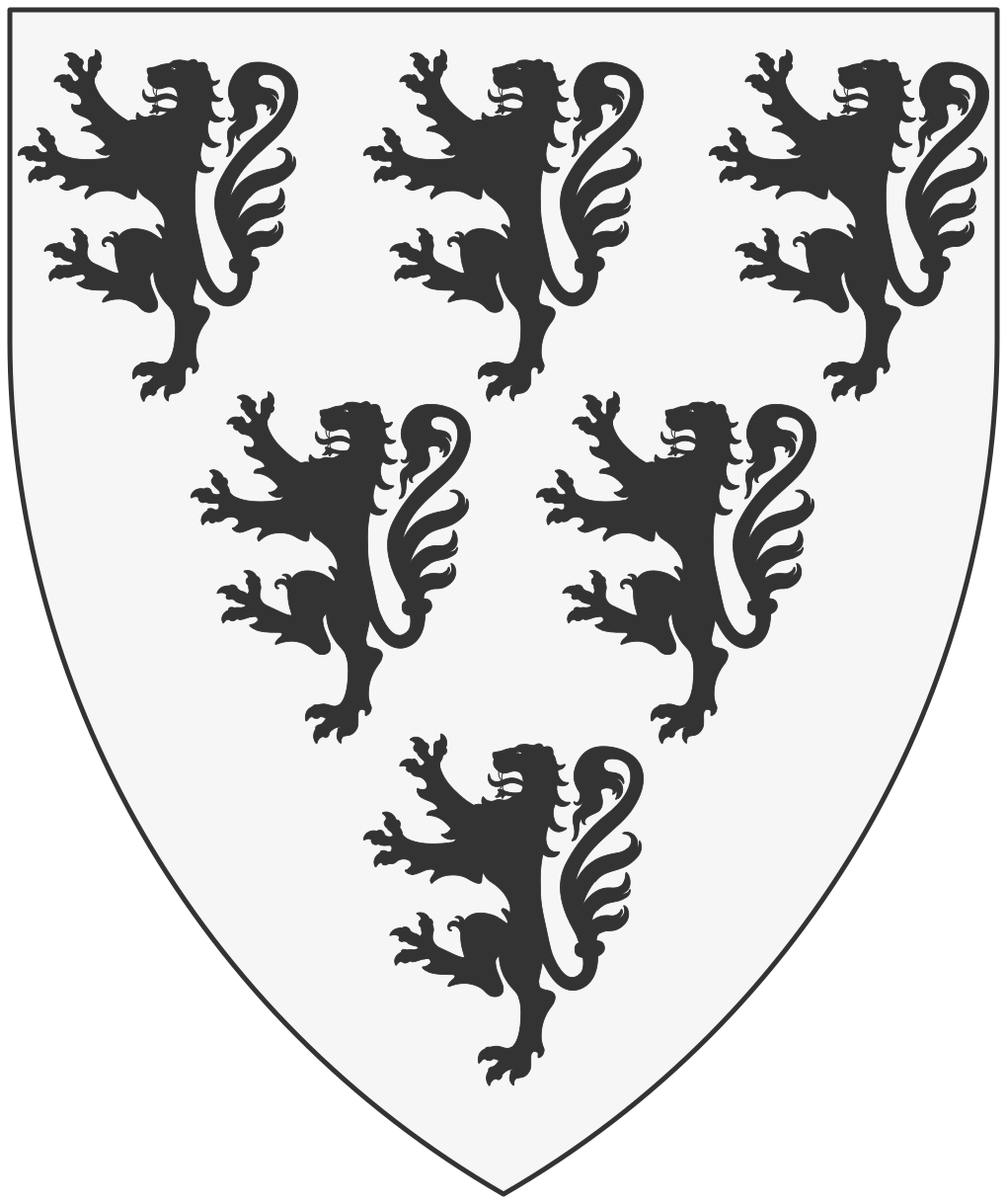
The coat of arms of the Earls Rivers

Earl Rivers was an English title, which has been created three times in the Peerage of England. It was held in succession by the families of Woodville (or Wydeville), Darcy and Savage.

== History ==
The first creation was made for Richard Woodville, 1st Baron Rivers, in 1466 and remained in this family until 1491. As borne by the Woodvilles the title was not derived from the name of a place, but from an ancient family name, Redvers, or Reviers, members of this family, whose arms are quartered on the Rivers shield, having been sometime Earls of Devon.

The second creation was made in 1626 for Thomas Darcy, 1st Viscount Colchester, who had succeeded as 3rd Baron Darcy of Chiche (created in 1551). In 1613, a reversion of the barony was granted to Sir Thomas Savage, Bt (created Viscount Savage in 1626 and son-in-law of Darcy); this creation and the earldom both had a remainder to Darcy's heirs male of his body, with remainder to Savage and the heirs male of his body. Savage's son John succeeded to the Savage baronetcy and viscountcy in 1635. In 1640 on the death of the 1st Earl, John succeeded to the 1613 reversion of the Darcy of Chiche barony, the Colchester viscountcy and the Rivers earldom; the 1551 creation of the Darcy of Chiche barony became extinct. The earldom and the subsidiary titles became extinct when John Savage, 5th Earl Rivers, died in 1737.

Elizabeth, Viscountess Savage, wife of Thomas, 1st Viscount Savage, daughter of the 1st Earl Rivers and mother of the 2nd Earl, was created Countess Rivers in her own right in 1641. This title was for life only and became extinct at her death in 1650.

A new Rivers barony, held by the family of Pitt and its later representative, that of Pitt-Rivers, was in existence from 1776 to 1880.

== List of titleholders ==
=== Earls Rivers, first creation (1466) ===
also Baron Rivers (England, 1448)

- Richard Woodville, 1st Earl Rivers (1405–1469)
- Anthony Woodville, 2nd Earl Rivers (c. 1440–1483)
- Richard Woodville, 3rd Earl Rivers (c. 1453–1491)

=== Earls Rivers, second creation (1626) ===
- Thomas Darcy, 1st Earl Rivers (1565–1640); m. Mary Kitson

also Viscount Colchester (England, 1621); Baron Darcy of Chiche (England, 1551); Baron Darcy of Chiche (England, 1613)

- John Savage, 2nd Earl Rivers (c. 1603–1654)

also Viscount Colchester (England, 1621); Viscount Savage (England, 1626); Baron Darcy of Chiche (England, 1613); Baronets, of Rocksavage (England, 1611)

- Thomas Savage, 3rd Earl Rivers (c. 1628–1694)
- Richard Savage, 4th Earl Rivers (c. 1654–1712)
- John Savage, 5th Earl Rivers (1665–1737)

=== Earl Rivers, third creation (1641) ===
- Elizabeth Savage, Countess Rivers (1581–1651)

also Viscountess Colchester (England, 1641); both titles for life.

== Family tree ==
Lane–Fox–Pitt–Rivers family tree

Baron Darcy of Chiche (England), 1551
Viscount Colchester, 1621; Earl Rivers (2nd creation), 1626
Thomas Darcy d. 1640; 1st Earl Rivers, etc. 3rd Baron Darcy of Chiche
Viscount Savage and Baron Darcy of Chiche (England), 1613
Elizabeth Savage, Countess Rivers; 1581–1650	Thomas Savage d. 1635; 1st Viscount Savage, etc.
John Savage; 1603–1654; 2nd Earl Rivers, etc.
Richard Lane d. 1668; 1st Baronet	George Pitt d. 1694	Jane Savage d. 1676	Thomas Savage d. 1694; 3rd Earl Rivers	Richard Savage
George Lane c. 1620–1683; 1st Viscount Lanesborough	George Pitt d. 1735	Richard Savage d. 1712; 4th Earl Rivers	John Savage; 1665–1737; 5th Earl Rivers
James Lane; 1650–1724; 2nd Viscount Lanesborough	Robert Benson d. 1731; 1st Baron Bingley	Frances Lane d. 1674	Henry Fox; 1650-1719	George Pitt d. 1745
Baron Bingley, of Bingley in the County of York (2nd creation), 1763	Baron Rivers, of Stratfield Saye, Hampshire
Harriet Benson d. 1771	George Fox-Lane c. 1697–1773; 1st Baron Bingley	Sackville Fox d. 1760	George Pitt; 1721–1803; 1st Baron Rivers
Robert Lane; 1732–1768; 2nd Baron Bingley	James Fox-Lane; 1756–1821	Marcia Lucy Pitt; 1756–1822	George Pitt; 1751–1828; 2nd Baron Rivers	Louisa Pitt d. 1791	Peter Beckford; 1740–1811
Barony Bingley (2nd creation), extinct, 1768
George Lane-Fox; 1793–1848	William Augustus Pitt Lane-Fox; 1796–1832	Sackville Lane-Fox; 1797–1874	Horace Pitt-Rivers; 1777–1831; 3rd Baron Rivers
George Lane-Fox; 1816–1896	Augustus Pitt Rivers; 1827–1900	Sackville Lane-Fox; 1827–1888; 12th Baron Conyers	George Pitt-Rivers; 1810–1866; 4th Baron Rivers	Horace Pitt-Rivers; 1814–1880
James Thomas Richard Lane-Fox; 1841–1906	Alexander Edward Lane Fox-Pitt-Rivers; 1855–1927	St George Lane Fox-Pitt; 1856–1932	William Augustus Lane Fox-Pitt b. 1858	Douglas Fox-Pitt; 1864–1922	Marcia Pelham; 1863–1926; Countess of Yarborough	Violet Herbert; 1865–1929; Countess of Powis	Henry Pitt-Rivers; 1849–1867; 5th Baron Rivers
George Lane-Fox; 1870–1947; 1st Baron Bingley	Edward Lane-Fox; 1874–1949	Emily Rachel Forster d. 1979	George Pitt-Rivers; 1890–1966	Rosalind Pitt-Rivers; 1907–1990	William Augustus Fitzgerald Lane Fox-Pitt; 1896–1988
Francis Lane Fox; 1899–1989	Marcia Agnes Mary Lane-Fox; 1904–1980	James Henry Lane-Fox b. 1912	Felicity Lane-Fox; 1918–1988; Baroness Lane-Fox	Michael Pitt-Rivers; 1917–1999	Julian Pitt-Rivers; 1919–2001	George Anthony Lane-Fox Pitt-Rivers b. 1932	Valerie Pitt-Rivers b. 1939	William Oliver Lane Fox-Pitt; 1932–2012
George Francis Lane Fox; 1931–2012	Robin Lane Fox b. 1946	William Fox-Pitt b. 1969
Edward Lane Fox b. 1976	Martha Lane Fox b. 1973
