= Baron Rivers =

Barony in the Peerage of Great Britain

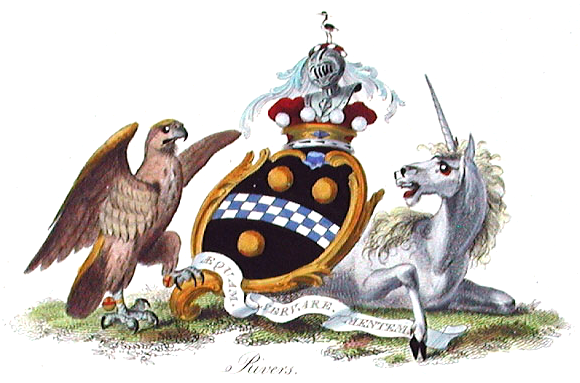
The coat of arms of the Barons Rivers (third creation).

Baron Rivers was a title that was created four times in British history, twice in the Peerage of England, once in the Peerage of Great Britain and once in the Peerage of the United Kingdom.

== History ==
The first creation came in 1299 when John Rivers was summoned to Parliament as Baron Rivers. The title became extinct on the death of the second Baron in circa 1340.

The second creation came in 1448 when Richard Woodville, father of Elizabeth Woodville (queen of England), received the title. It was later subsumed when Woodville became Earl Rivers in 1466. Both titles became extinct on the death of the third earl in 1491.

The third creation came in 1776 when George Pitt was made Baron Rivers, of Strathfield-Say in the County of Southampton, in the Peerage of Great Britain. He was a descendant of John Pitt (16th century), the father of Thomas Pitt, ancestor of the Earls of Londonderry, Barons Camelford and Earls of Chatham, and of Sir William Pitt, whose grandson George Pitt married Jane Savage, the daughter of John Savage, 2nd Earl Rivers. George Pitt's eldest son and namesake was the aforementioned George Pitt, who was elevated to the peerage in 1776. In 1802 Lord Rivers was created Baron Rivers, of Sudeley Castle in the County of Gloucester, with remainder to 1) his brother General Sir William Augustus Pitt and the heirs male of his body, and 2) William Horace Beckford (son of Peter Beckford of Stapleton in Dorset by his wife Louisa, daughter of Lord Rivers) and the heirs male of his body. This title was in the Peerage of the United Kingdom.

He was succeeded in both baronies by his son, the second Baron. He had previously represented Dorset in Parliament. He sold part of the family estates, those around Stratfield Saye House to the nation in about 1814, so that it could be given to Arthur Wellesley, 1st Duke of Wellington. On his death in 1829 the barony of 1776 became extinct while he was succeeded in the barony of 1802 according to the special remainder to his nephew William Beckford, the third Baron. He was the son of the aforementioned Peter Beckford and Louisa Pitt. He assumed at the same time by Royal licence the surname of Pitt-Rivers in lieu of his patronymic. The fourth Baron held political office as a Lord-in-waiting from 1853 to 1858 and 1859 to 1866. The title became extinct on the death of the sixth Baron in 1880.

== List of titleholders ==
=== Baron Rivers; First creation (1299) ===
- John Rivers, 1st Baron Rivers (d. c. 1311)
- John Rivers, 2nd Baron Rivers (d. c. 1340)

=== Baron Rivers; Second creation (1448) ===
- Richard Woodville, 1st Baron Rivers. Created Earl Rivers in 1466; extinct on death of 3rd earl and baron in 1491.

=== Baron Rivers; Third creation (1776) ===
- George Pitt, 1st Baron Rivers (1721–1803) (created Baron Rivers again in 1802; see below)
- George Pitt, 2nd Baron Rivers (1751–1828)

=== Baron Rivers; Fourth creation (1802) ===
- George Pitt, 1st Baron Rivers (1721–1803)
- George Pitt, 2nd Baron Rivers (1751–1828)
- William Horace Pitt-Rivers, 3rd Baron Rivers (1777–1831)
- George Pitt-Rivers, 4th Baron Rivers (1810–1866)
  - George Horace Pitt (1834–1850)
  - Granville Beckford Pitt (1838–1855)
  - William Frederick Pitt (1845–1859)
- Henry Peter Pitt-Rivers, 5th Baron Rivers (1849–1867)
- Horace Pitt-Rivers, 6th Baron Rivers (1814–1880)

Darcy–Lane–Fox–Pitt–Rivers family tree

Baron Darcy of Chiche, 1551
Thomas Darcy; 1506–1558; 1st Baron Darcy of Chiche
John Darcy c. 1532–1580/1581; 2nd Baron Darcy of Chiche
Viscount Colchester, 1621; Earl Rivers (2nd creation), 1626
Thomas Darcy; 1565–1640; 1st Earl Rivers, etc. 3rd Baron Darcy of Chiche
Earl Rivers (3rd creation) and Viscount Colchester, 1641 (for life)	Viscount Savage and Baron Darcy of Chiche, 1613
Elizabeth Savage; 1581–1650; Countess Savage, etc.	Thomas Savage d. 1635; 1st Viscount Savage, etc.
Earldom of Rivers (3rd creation) extinct, 1641
John Savage; 1603–1654; 2nd Earl Rivers, etc. 2nd Viscount Savage, etc.
Richard Lane d. 1668; 1st Baronet	George Pitt d. 1694	Jane Savage d. 1676	Thomas Savage; 1628–1694; 3rd Earl Rivers; 3rd Viscount Savage, etc.	Richard Savage
Viscount Lanesborough (1st creation), 1676
George Lane c. 1620–1683; 1st Viscount Lanesborough	George Pitt d. 1735	Richard Savage d. 1712; 4th Earl Rivers; 4th Viscount Savage, etc.	John Savage; 1665–1737; 5th Earl Rivers; 5th Viscount Savage, etc.
Baron Bingley (1st creation), 1713	Earldom of Rivers (2nd creation) and Viscount Savage and subsidiary titles extinct, 1737
Robert Benson c. 1676–1731; Baron Bingley	James Lane; 1650–1724; 2nd Viscount Lanesborough	Frances Lane d. 1674	Henry Fox; 1650-1719	George Pitt d. 1745
Barony of Bingley (1st creation) extinct, 1731	Viscountcy of Lanesborough (1st creation) extinct, 1724
Baron Bingley (2nd creation), 1763	Baron Rivers (3rd creation), 1776; Baron Rivers (4th creation), 11802
Harriet Benson d. 1771	George Fox-Lane c. 1697–1773; 1st Baron Bingley	Sackville Fox d. 1760	George Pitt; 1721–1803; 1st Baron Rivers
Robert Lane; 1732–1768; 2nd Baron Bingley	James Fox-Lane; 1756–1821	Marcia Lucy Pitt; 1756–1822	George Pitt; 1751–1828; 2nd Baron Rivers	Louisa Pitt d. 1791	Peter Beckford; 1740–1811
Barony of Bingley (2nd creation) extinct, 1768	Barony of Rivers (3rd creation) extinct but 4th creation continued, 1828
George Lane-Fox; 1793–1848	William Augustus Pitt Lane-Fox; 1796–1832	Sackville Lane-Fox; 1797–1874	William Horace Pitt-Rivers; 1777–1831; 3rd Baron Rivers
George Lane-Fox; 1816–1896	Augustus Pitt Rivers; 1827–1900	Sackville Lane-Fox; 1827–1888; 12th Baron Conyers	George Pitt-Rivers; 1810–1866; 4th Baron Rivers	Horace Pitt-Rivers; 1814–1880; 6th Baron Rivers
Barony of Rivers (4th creation) extinct, 1880
James Thomas Richard Lane-Fox; 1841–1906	Alexander Edward Lane Fox-Pitt-Rivers; 1855–1927	St George Lane Fox-Pitt; 1856–1932	William Augustus Lane Fox-Pitt b. 1858	Douglas Fox-Pitt; 1864–1922	Marcia Pelham; 1863–1926; 13th Baroness Conyers, Baroness Fauconberg	Violet Herbert; 1865–1929; Baroness Darcy de Knayth	Henry Peter Pitt-Rivers; 1849–1867; 5th Baron Rivers
Baron Bingley (3rd creation), 1933
George Lane-Fox; 1870–1947; 1st Baron Bingley	Edward Lane-Fox; 1874–1949	Emily Rachel Forster d. 1979	George Pitt-Rivers; 1890–1966	Rosalind Pitt-Rivers; 1907–1990	William Augustus Fitzgerald Lane Fox-Pitt; 1896–1988
Barony of Bingley (3rd creation) extinct, 1947
Baroness Lane-Fox, of Bramham in the County of West Yorkshire, 1981 (for life)
Marcia Agnes Mary Lane-Fox; 1904–1980	Francis Lane Fox; 1899–1989	James Henry Lane-Fox b. 1912	Felicity Lane-Fox; 1918–1988; Baroness Lane-Fox	Michael Pitt-Rivers; 1917–1999	Julian Pitt-Rivers; 1919–2001	George Anthony Lane-Fox Pitt-Rivers b. 1932	Valerie Pitt-Rivers b. 1939	William Oliver Lane Fox-Pitt; 1932–2012
Barony of Lane-Fox extinct, 1988
George Francis Lane Fox; 1931–2012	Robin Lane Fox b. 1946	William Fox-Pitt b. 1969
Baroness Lane-Fox, of Soho in the City of Westminster, 2013 (for life)
Edward Lane Fox b. 1976	Martha Lane Fox b. 1973; Baroness Lane-Fox

== See also ==
- Earl Rivers
- Earl of Londonderry
- Earl of Chatham
- Baron Camelford
