= Baron Bingley =

Barony in the Peerage of Great Britain

Barony of Bingley
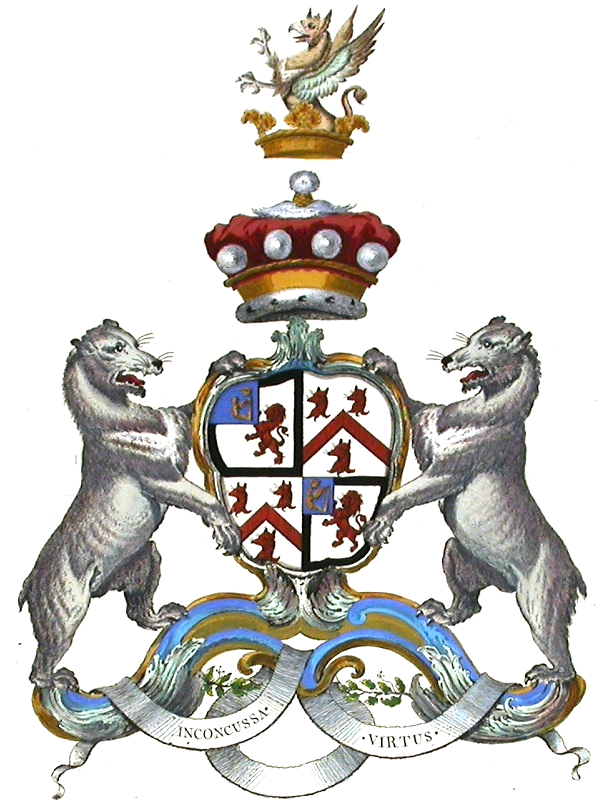
- Arms of the 2nd creation Arms: Quarterly, 1st and 4th: Argent a Lion rampant within a Bordure Sable on a Canton Azure a Crown Or (Lane); 2nd and 3rd: Argent a Chevron between three Foxes' Heads erased Gules (Fox). Crest: Out of a Ducal Coronet Or a Demi Griffin segreant Sable winged Argent. Supporters: On either side a Bear Argent.
- Creation date: 13 May 1762
- Creation: Second creation
- Created by: George III
- Peerage: Peerage of Great Britain
- First holder: George Fox-Lane, 1st Baron Bingley
- Last holder: George Fox-Lane, 1st Baron Bingley
- Remainder to: Heirs male of the first baron's body lawfully begotten
- Extinction date: 22 February 1773
- Seat: Bramham Park
- Motto: Inconcussa Virtus ("Unquestioned virtue")

Baron Bingley is a title that has been created three times, twice in the Peerage of Great Britain and once in the Peerage of the United Kingdom.

== History ==
The first creation came in 1713 in the Peerage of Great Britain, when the former Chancellor of the Exchequer, Robert Benson, was made Baron Bingley, of Bingley in the County of York. He had no sons and the title became extinct on his death in 1731.

However, the title was revived in 1762 for his son-in-law, George Fox-Lane, who was also created Baron Bingley, of Bingley in the County of York, with remainder only to his heirs male with his wife, Harriet (daughter of the first Baron of the 1713 creation). Born George Fox, he was the son of Henry Fox and Frances, daughter of George Lane, 1st Viscount Lanesborough (see Viscount Lanesborough), and assumed in 1751 by Act of Parliament the additional surname of Lane. Before his elevation to the peerage he had represented Hedon and York in the House of Commons. His son and heir, Robert Fox-Lane, Member of Parliament for York, predeceased him in 1768 and the barony consequently became extinct on Lord Bingley's death in 1773.

The most recent creation came in the Peerage of the United Kingdom in 1933, when the Conservative politician George Lane-Fox, was created Baron Bingley, of Bramham in the County of York. He was the great-great-grandson of James Fox-Lane, a nephew of the first Baron of the second creation, and was a former Member of Parliament for Barkston Ash. Lord Bingley had four daughters but no sons and on his death in 1947, this title also became extinct.

== Barons Bingley; First creation (1713) ==
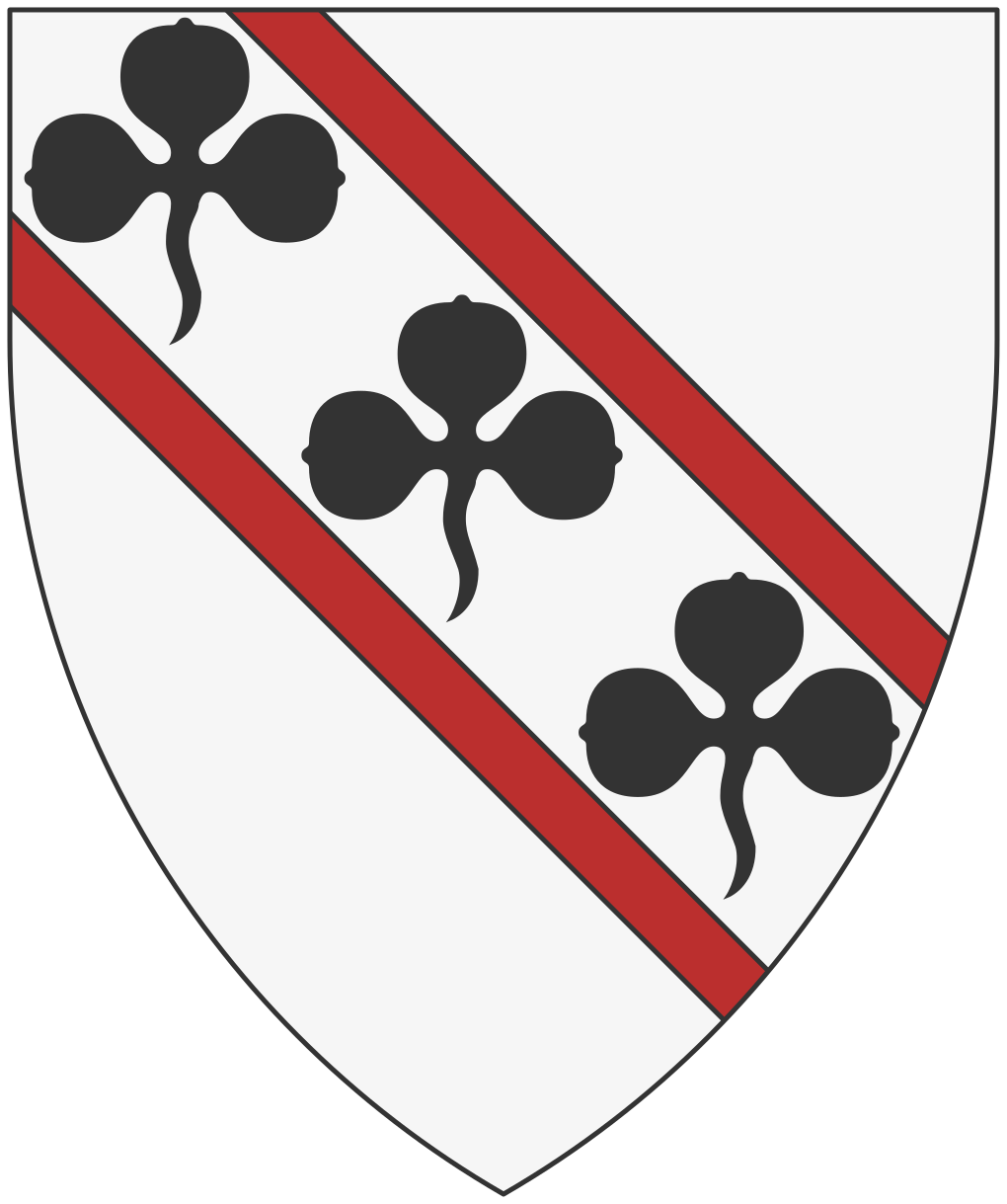

- Robert Benson, Baron Bingley (c. 1676–1731)

== Barons Bingley; Second creation (1763) ==
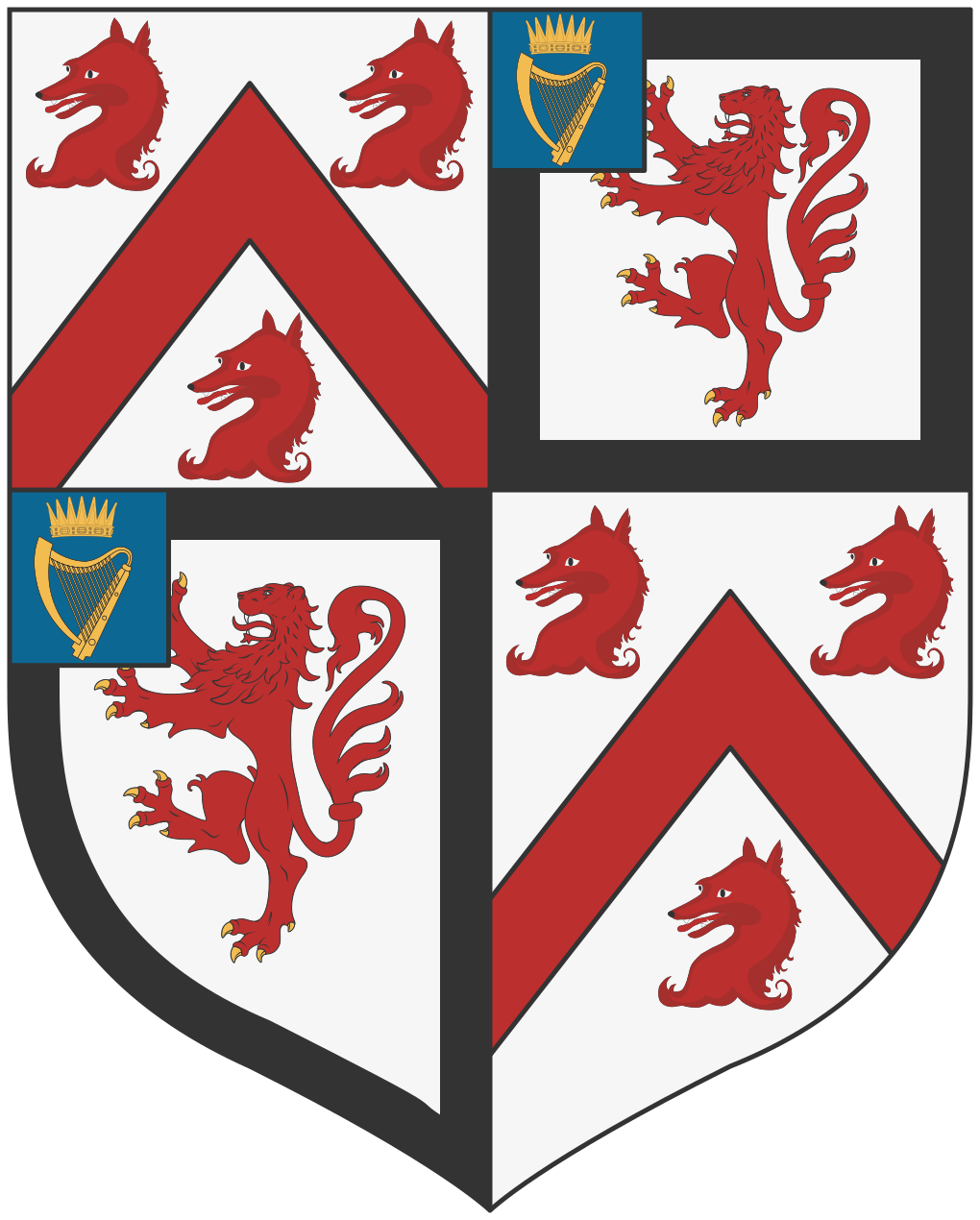

- George Fox-Lane, 1st Baron Bingley (c. 1697–1773)
  - Robert Fox-Lane (1732–1768)

== Barons Bingley; Third creation (1933) ==
- George Richard Lane-Fox, 1st Baron Bingley (1870–1947)

== Family tree ==
Darcy–Lane–Fox–Pitt–Rivers family tree

Baron Darcy of Chiche, 1551
Thomas Darcy; 1506–1558; 1st Baron Darcy of Chiche
John Darcy c. 1532–1580/1581; 2nd Baron Darcy of Chiche
Viscount Colchester, 1621; Earl Rivers (2nd creation), 1626
Thomas Darcy; 1565–1640; 1st Earl Rivers, etc. 3rd Baron Darcy of Chiche
Earl Rivers (3rd creation) and Viscount Colchester, 1641 (for life)	Viscount Savage and Baron Darcy of Chiche, 1613
Elizabeth Savage; 1581–1650; Countess Savage, etc.	Thomas Savage d. 1635; 1st Viscount Savage, etc.
Earldom of Rivers (3rd creation) extinct, 1641
John Savage; 1603–1654; 2nd Earl Rivers, etc. 2nd Viscount Savage, etc.
Richard Lane d. 1668; 1st Baronet	George Pitt d. 1694	Jane Savage d. 1676	Thomas Savage; 1628–1694; 3rd Earl Rivers; 3rd Viscount Savage, etc.	Richard Savage
Viscount Lanesborough (1st creation), 1676
George Lane c. 1620–1683; 1st Viscount Lanesborough	George Pitt d. 1735	Richard Savage d. 1712; 4th Earl Rivers; 4th Viscount Savage, etc.	John Savage; 1665–1737; 5th Earl Rivers; 5th Viscount Savage, etc.
Baron Bingley (1st creation), 1713	Earldom of Rivers (2nd creation) and Viscount Savage and subsidiary titles extinct, 1737
Robert Benson c. 1676–1731; Baron Bingley	James Lane; 1650–1724; 2nd Viscount Lanesborough	Frances Lane d. 1674	Henry Fox; 1650-1719	George Pitt d. 1745
Barony of Bingley (1st creation) extinct, 1731	Viscountcy of Lanesborough (1st creation) extinct, 1724
Baron Bingley (2nd creation), 1763	Baron Rivers (3rd creation), 1776; Baron Rivers (4th creation), 11802
Harriet Benson d. 1771	George Fox-Lane c. 1697–1773; 1st Baron Bingley	Sackville Fox d. 1760	George Pitt; 1721–1803; 1st Baron Rivers
Robert Lane; 1732–1768; 2nd Baron Bingley	James Fox-Lane; 1756–1821	Marcia Lucy Pitt; 1756–1822	George Pitt; 1751–1828; 2nd Baron Rivers	Louisa Pitt d. 1791	Peter Beckford; 1740–1811
Barony of Bingley (2nd creation) extinct, 1768	Barony of Rivers (3rd creation) extinct but 4th creation continued, 1828
George Lane-Fox; 1793–1848	William Augustus Pitt Lane-Fox; 1796–1832	Sackville Lane-Fox; 1797–1874	William Horace Pitt-Rivers; 1777–1831; 3rd Baron Rivers
George Lane-Fox; 1816–1896	Augustus Pitt Rivers; 1827–1900	Sackville Lane-Fox; 1827–1888; 12th Baron Conyers	George Pitt-Rivers; 1810–1866; 4th Baron Rivers	Horace Pitt-Rivers; 1814–1880; 6th Baron Rivers
Barony of Rivers (4th creation) extinct, 1880
James Thomas Richard Lane-Fox; 1841–1906	Alexander Edward Lane Fox-Pitt-Rivers; 1855–1927	St George Lane Fox-Pitt; 1856–1932	William Augustus Lane Fox-Pitt b. 1858	Douglas Fox-Pitt; 1864–1922	Marcia Pelham; 1863–1926; 13th Baroness Conyers, Baroness Fauconberg	Violet Herbert; 1865–1929; Baroness Darcy de Knayth	Henry Peter Pitt-Rivers; 1849–1867; 5th Baron Rivers
Baron Bingley (3rd creation), 1933
George Lane-Fox; 1870–1947; 1st Baron Bingley	Edward Lane-Fox; 1874–1949	Emily Rachel Forster d. 1979	George Pitt-Rivers; 1890–1966	Rosalind Pitt-Rivers; 1907–1990	William Augustus Fitzgerald Lane Fox-Pitt; 1896–1988
Barony of Bingley (3rd creation) extinct, 1947
Baroness Lane-Fox, of Bramham in the County of West Yorkshire, 1981 (for life)
Marcia Agnes Mary Lane-Fox; 1904–1980	Francis Lane Fox; 1899–1989	James Henry Lane-Fox b. 1912	Felicity Lane-Fox; 1918–1988; Baroness Lane-Fox	Michael Pitt-Rivers; 1917–1999	Julian Pitt-Rivers; 1919–2001	George Anthony Lane-Fox Pitt-Rivers b. 1932	Valerie Pitt-Rivers b. 1939	William Oliver Lane Fox-Pitt; 1932–2012
Barony of Lane-Fox extinct, 1988
George Francis Lane Fox; 1931–2012	Robin Lane Fox b. 1946	William Fox-Pitt b. 1969
Baroness Lane-Fox, of Soho in the City of Westminster, 2013 (for life)
Edward Lane Fox b. 1976	Martha Lane Fox b. 1973; Baroness Lane-Fox
