= St George Lane Fox-Pitt =

St George William Lane Fox-Pitt (born 14 September 1856 in Malta, died 6 April 1932 in South Eaton Place) was a British electrical engineer and student of psychic phenomena.

== Life ==
His parents were Lieutenant General Augustus Henry Lane-Fox (1827–1900) and Alice Margaret (1828–1910, née Stanley). His younger sister was the essayist Agnes Geraldine Grove. On the death of his father's cousin Horace Pitt-Rivers, 6th Baron Rivers, the family took the name Fox Pitt-Rivers on 25 May 1880.

In 1878, Fox-Pitt was granted a patent on a light bulb with a platinum-iridium filament. The patent also describes a system for electric power distribution using incandescent lamps in parallel.

On 12 December 1879, Charles F. Brush founded the Anglo-American Electric Light Company Ltd in the UK, and in the same year acquired the patent rights to produce the Lane-Fox incandescent lamp. On 24 March 1880, he founded a new company, Anglo-American Brush Electric Light Corporation, which took over the previous one.

About 1880, Fox-Pitt is said to have successfully experimented with charred plant fibres as the filament material. That was about the same time as the development of the light bulb with carbon filament by Edison in the United States. By 1883, Fox-Pitt had obtained further patents.

Fox-Pitt wrote books on the philosophy of science, education, and social problems. He was temporarily Vice-President of the Moral Education League and organized the International Moral Education Congress. He was also one of the first active members of the Society for Psychical Research.

In 1891, he repurchased the patent rights of the Anglo-American Brush Electric Light Corporation and built himself a small lamp factory.

In 1898, he participated in a railway concession in Ecuador.

In 1899, he married Lady Edith Gertrude Douglas (1874–1963), the daughter of John Douglas, 9th Marquess of Queensberry.

Darcy–Lane–Fox–Pitt–Rivers family tree

Baron Darcy of Chiche, 1551
Thomas Darcy; 1506–1558; 1st Baron Darcy of Chiche
John Darcy c. 1532–1580/1581; 2nd Baron Darcy of Chiche
Viscount Colchester, 1621; Earl Rivers (2nd creation), 1626
Thomas Darcy; 1565–1640; 1st Earl Rivers, etc. 3rd Baron Darcy of Chiche
Earl Rivers (3rd creation) and Viscount Colchester, 1641 (for life)	Viscount Savage and Baron Darcy of Chiche, 1613
Elizabeth Savage; 1581–1650; Countess Savage, etc.	Thomas Savage d. 1635; 1st Viscount Savage, etc.
Earldom of Rivers (3rd creation) extinct, 1641
John Savage; 1603–1654; 2nd Earl Rivers, etc. 2nd Viscount Savage, etc.
Richard Lane d. 1668; 1st Baronet	George Pitt d. 1694	Jane Savage d. 1676	Thomas Savage; 1628–1694; 3rd Earl Rivers; 3rd Viscount Savage, etc.	Richard Savage
Viscount Lanesborough (1st creation), 1676
George Lane c. 1620–1683; 1st Viscount Lanesborough	George Pitt d. 1735	Richard Savage d. 1712; 4th Earl Rivers; 4th Viscount Savage, etc.	John Savage; 1665–1737; 5th Earl Rivers; 5th Viscount Savage, etc.
Baron Bingley (1st creation), 1713	Earldom of Rivers (2nd creation) and Viscount Savage and subsidiary titles extinct, 1737
Robert Benson c. 1676–1731; Baron Bingley	James Lane; 1650–1724; 2nd Viscount Lanesborough	Frances Lane d. 1674	Henry Fox; 1650-1719	George Pitt d. 1745
Barony of Bingley (1st creation) extinct, 1731	Viscountcy of Lanesborough (1st creation) extinct, 1724
Baron Bingley (2nd creation), 1763	Baron Rivers (3rd creation), 1776; Baron Rivers (4th creation), 11802
Harriet Benson d. 1771	George Fox-Lane c. 1697–1773; 1st Baron Bingley	Sackville Fox d. 1760	George Pitt; 1721–1803; 1st Baron Rivers
Robert Lane; 1732–1768; 2nd Baron Bingley	James Fox-Lane; 1756–1821	Marcia Lucy Pitt; 1756–1822	George Pitt; 1751–1828; 2nd Baron Rivers	Louisa Pitt d. 1791	Peter Beckford; 1740–1811
Barony of Bingley (2nd creation) extinct, 1768	Barony of Rivers (3rd creation) extinct but 4th creation continued, 1828
George Lane-Fox; 1793–1848	William Augustus Pitt Lane-Fox; 1796–1832	Sackville Lane-Fox; 1797–1874	William Horace Pitt-Rivers; 1777–1831; 3rd Baron Rivers
George Lane-Fox; 1816–1896	Augustus Pitt Rivers; 1827–1900	Sackville Lane-Fox; 1827–1888; 12th Baron Conyers	George Pitt-Rivers; 1810–1866; 4th Baron Rivers	Horace Pitt-Rivers; 1814–1880; 6th Baron Rivers
Barony of Rivers (4th creation) extinct, 1880
James Thomas Richard Lane-Fox; 1841–1906	Alexander Edward Lane Fox-Pitt-Rivers; 1855–1927	St George Lane Fox-Pitt; 1856–1932	William Augustus Lane Fox-Pitt b. 1858	Douglas Fox-Pitt; 1864–1922	Marcia Pelham; 1863–1926; 13th Baroness Conyers, Baroness Fauconberg	Violet Herbert; 1865–1929; Baroness Darcy de Knayth	Henry Peter Pitt-Rivers; 1849–1867; 5th Baron Rivers
Baron Bingley (3rd creation), 1933
George Lane-Fox; 1870–1947; 1st Baron Bingley	Edward Lane-Fox; 1874–1949	Emily Rachel Forster d. 1979	George Pitt-Rivers; 1890–1966	Rosalind Pitt-Rivers; 1907–1990	William Augustus Fitzgerald Lane Fox-Pitt; 1896–1988
Barony of Bingley (3rd creation) extinct, 1947
Baroness Lane-Fox, of Bramham in the County of West Yorkshire, 1981 (for life)
Marcia Agnes Mary Lane-Fox; 1904–1980	Francis Lane Fox; 1899–1989	James Henry Lane-Fox b. 1912	Felicity Lane-Fox; 1918–1988; Baroness Lane-Fox	Michael Pitt-Rivers; 1917–1999	Julian Pitt-Rivers; 1919–2001	George Anthony Lane-Fox Pitt-Rivers b. 1932	Valerie Pitt-Rivers b. 1939	William Oliver Lane Fox-Pitt; 1932–2012
Barony of Lane-Fox extinct, 1988
George Francis Lane Fox; 1931–2012	Robin Lane Fox b. 1946	William Fox-Pitt b. 1969
Baroness Lane-Fox, of Soho in the City of Westminster, 2013 (for life)
Edward Lane Fox b. 1976	Martha Lane Fox b. 1973; Baroness Lane-Fox

== Works ==
- The Purpose of Education, 1914, Cambridge University Press,
- Free Will & Destiny, 1920, Constable Books, London
