= Sackville Lane-Fox =

British politician

Sackville Walter Lane-Fox (24 March 1797 – 18 August 1874), was a British Conservative Party politician.

== Background ==
Lane-Fox was the son of James Fox-Lane, of Bramham Park, West Yorkshire, by the Honourable Marcia Lucy, daughter of George Pitt, 1st Baron Rivers. He was the brother of George Lane-Fox and the uncle of Augustus Pitt Rivers.

== Political career ==
Lane-Fox was returned to parliament as one of two representatives for Helston in 1831. He became the sole representative after the 'Great' or 'First' Reform Act of that year reduced the low-electorate constituency to one seat. He lost the seat in 1835, and remained out of the House of Commons until 1840, when he was returned for Beverley in East Yorkshire. He lost the seat the following year and was re-elected to the Commons the year after as one of two MPs for Ipswich, Suffolk. In 1847 he was once again elected for Beverley, a seat he held until 1852.

== Family ==
Lane-Fox married Lady Charlotte Mary Anne Georgiana Osborne, daughter of George Osborne, 6th Duke of Leeds, in 1826. She died in January 1836, aged 44. They had five children:

1. Hon. Elizabeth Catherine (died 29 October 1879, aged 50) married Rev. R W Cracroft, rector of Harrington, Lincolnshire.
2. Hon. Lora Mary (died 12 February 1908)
3. Hon. Sackville George (14 September 1827 – 24 August 1888) succeeded his maternal uncle the Duke of Leeds as 12th Baron Conyers in 1859.
4. Hon. Charles Pierrepont Darcy (25 August 1830 – 13 September 1874), wounded at the Battle of Alma while an officer in the Crimean war
5. Marcia Frederica Isabella

The family received rents of land and buildings (the leases commencing between 1836 and 1843) for the duration of the lives of three of Lane-Fox's children, assigned by his cousin Francis D'Arcy-Osborne, 7th Duke of Leeds, mainly in the Cornish parishes of Breage, Camborne, Germoe, Ludgvan, St Erth and Wendron — which brought annual income of c. £5,000 (equivalent to £582,000 in 2025). On Elizabeth's death these freehold reversions (or near-equivalents) reverted to the ownership of the then-heir of the senior branch, George Osborne, 9th Duke of Leeds.

Sackville Walter Lane Fox after the death of his wife had a relationship with Charlotte Susannah Olding (1825–1881) and they had two daughters the eldest Charlotte Alice Fox surname Olding was born 18 January 1850 and the younger Lucy Susannah Charlotte surname Fox born 27 March 1855.

Charlotte Alice Fox Olding was born at 11 Burton Street London and was Baptised eleven years later (5 August 1861) as Alice Florence Marion Fox at St Saviour Jersey by The Rector William Corbet Le Breton who was the Father of Lillie Langtry - The Jersey Lily. Florence died 24 July 1926 as Florence Alice Marion Fox-Bryant

Lucy Susannah Charlotte was born at 12 Hill Street Knightsbridge but her mother's address at the time was 17 Cowley Street Westminster. Lucy died in Kensington in 1927.

There are no marriage records for Sackville Walter Lane Fox and Charlotte Susannah Olding. Charlotte Susannah Olding does have two death certificates one as Charlotte Susannah Fox widow of Sackville Walter Lane Fox which was superseded by a death certificate in the name of Susannah Charlotte Olding.

Darcy–Lane–Fox–Pitt–Rivers family tree

Baron Darcy of Chiche, 1551
Thomas Darcy; 1506–1558; 1st Baron Darcy of Chiche
John Darcy c. 1532–1580/1581; 2nd Baron Darcy of Chiche
Viscount Colchester, 1621; Earl Rivers (2nd creation), 1626
Thomas Darcy; 1565–1640; 1st Earl Rivers, etc. 3rd Baron Darcy of Chiche
Earl Rivers (3rd creation) and Viscount Colchester, 1641 (for life)	Viscount Savage and Baron Darcy of Chiche, 1613
Elizabeth Savage; 1581–1650; Countess Savage, etc.	Thomas Savage d. 1635; 1st Viscount Savage, etc.
Earldom of Rivers (3rd creation) extinct, 1641
John Savage; 1603–1654; 2nd Earl Rivers, etc. 2nd Viscount Savage, etc.
Richard Lane d. 1668; 1st Baronet	George Pitt d. 1694	Jane Savage d. 1676	Thomas Savage; 1628–1694; 3rd Earl Rivers; 3rd Viscount Savage, etc.	Richard Savage
Viscount Lanesborough (1st creation), 1676
George Lane c. 1620–1683; 1st Viscount Lanesborough	George Pitt d. 1735	Richard Savage d. 1712; 4th Earl Rivers; 4th Viscount Savage, etc.	John Savage; 1665–1737; 5th Earl Rivers; 5th Viscount Savage, etc.
Baron Bingley (1st creation), 1713	Earldom of Rivers (2nd creation) and Viscount Savage and subsidiary titles extinct, 1737
Robert Benson c. 1676–1731; Baron Bingley	James Lane; 1650–1724; 2nd Viscount Lanesborough	Frances Lane d. 1674	Henry Fox; 1650-1719	George Pitt d. 1745
Barony of Bingley (1st creation) extinct, 1731	Viscountcy of Lanesborough (1st creation) extinct, 1724
Baron Bingley (2nd creation), 1763	Baron Rivers (3rd creation), 1776; Baron Rivers (4th creation), 11802
Harriet Benson d. 1771	George Fox-Lane c. 1697–1773; 1st Baron Bingley	Sackville Fox d. 1760	George Pitt; 1721–1803; 1st Baron Rivers
Robert Lane; 1732–1768; 2nd Baron Bingley	James Fox-Lane; 1756–1821	Marcia Lucy Pitt; 1756–1822	George Pitt; 1751–1828; 2nd Baron Rivers	Louisa Pitt d. 1791	Peter Beckford; 1740–1811
Barony of Bingley (2nd creation) extinct, 1768	Barony of Rivers (3rd creation) extinct but 4th creation continued, 1828
George Lane-Fox; 1793–1848	William Augustus Pitt Lane-Fox; 1796–1832	Sackville Lane-Fox; 1797–1874	William Horace Pitt-Rivers; 1777–1831; 3rd Baron Rivers
George Lane-Fox; 1816–1896	Augustus Pitt Rivers; 1827–1900	Sackville Lane-Fox; 1827–1888; 12th Baron Conyers	George Pitt-Rivers; 1810–1866; 4th Baron Rivers	Horace Pitt-Rivers; 1814–1880; 6th Baron Rivers
Barony of Rivers (4th creation) extinct, 1880
James Thomas Richard Lane-Fox; 1841–1906	Alexander Edward Lane Fox-Pitt-Rivers; 1855–1927	St George Lane Fox-Pitt; 1856–1932	William Augustus Lane Fox-Pitt b. 1858	Douglas Fox-Pitt; 1864–1922	Marcia Pelham; 1863–1926; 13th Baroness Conyers, Baroness Fauconberg	Violet Herbert; 1865–1929; Baroness Darcy de Knayth	Henry Peter Pitt-Rivers; 1849–1867; 5th Baron Rivers
Baron Bingley (3rd creation), 1933
George Lane-Fox; 1870–1947; 1st Baron Bingley	Edward Lane-Fox; 1874–1949	Emily Rachel Forster d. 1979	George Pitt-Rivers; 1890–1966	Rosalind Pitt-Rivers; 1907–1990	William Augustus Fitzgerald Lane Fox-Pitt; 1896–1988
Barony of Bingley (3rd creation) extinct, 1947
Baroness Lane-Fox, of Bramham in the County of West Yorkshire, 1981 (for life)
Marcia Agnes Mary Lane-Fox; 1904–1980	Francis Lane Fox; 1899–1989	James Henry Lane-Fox b. 1912	Felicity Lane-Fox; 1918–1988; Baroness Lane-Fox	Michael Pitt-Rivers; 1917–1999	Julian Pitt-Rivers; 1919–2001	George Anthony Lane-Fox Pitt-Rivers b. 1932	Valerie Pitt-Rivers b. 1939	William Oliver Lane Fox-Pitt; 1932–2012
Barony of Lane-Fox extinct, 1988
George Francis Lane Fox; 1931–2012	Robin Lane Fox b. 1946	William Fox-Pitt b. 1969
Baroness Lane-Fox, of Soho in the City of Westminster, 2013 (for life)
Edward Lane Fox b. 1976	Martha Lane Fox b. 1973; Baroness Lane-Fox

Parliament of the United Kingdom
Preceded by Lord James Townshend; Sir Samuel Brooke-Pechell, Bt	Member of Parliament for Helston; 1831–1835; With: Lord James Townshend 1831–1832	Succeeded by Lord James Townshend (representation reduced to one member 1832)
Preceded by James Hogg; George Lane-Fox	Member of Parliament for Beverley; 1840–1841; With: James Hogg	Succeeded by James Hogg; John Towneley
Preceded by The Earl of Desart; Thomas Gladstone	Member of Parliament for Ipswich; 1842–1847; With: John Neilson Gladstone	Succeeded by John Cobbold; Hugh Adair
Preceded by Sir James Hogg, Bt; John Towneley	Member of Parliament for Beverley; 1847–1852; With: John Towneley	Succeeded by Hon. Francis Charles Lawley; William Wells
