= George Lane-Fox, 1st Baron Bingley =

British politician (1870–1947)

Lieutenant-Colonel The Right Honourable The Lord Bingley PC
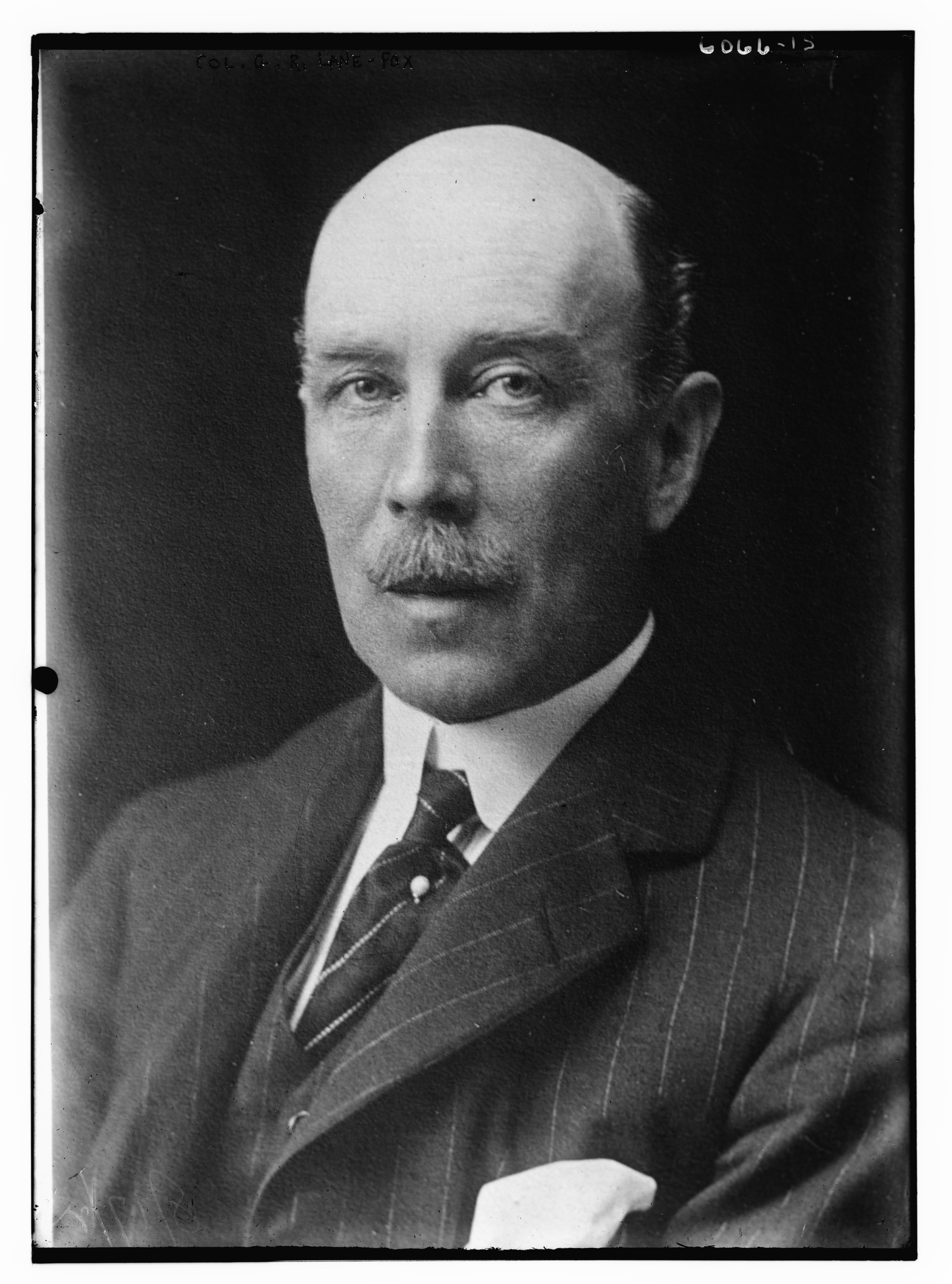
- Bingley in 1900

Secretary for Mines
- In office 6 November 1922 – 22 January 1924
- Monarch: George V
- Prime Minister: Bonar Law; Stanley Baldwin
- Preceded by: William Bridgeman
- Succeeded by: Manny Shinwell
- In office 11 November 1924 – 13 January 1928
- Monarch: George V
- Prime Minister: Stanley Baldwin
- Preceded by: Manny Shinwell
- Succeeded by: Douglas King

Personal details
- Born: 15 December 1870 London, England
- Died: 11 December 1947 (aged 76)
- Party: Conservative
- Spouse: Mary Wood (1877–1962)
- Education: New College, Oxford

George Richard Lane Fox, 1st Baron Bingley, PC (15 December 1870 – 11 December 1947) was a British Conservative politician. He served as Secretary for Mines between 1922 and 1924, and again between 1924 and 1928.

== Early life ==
Lane Fox was born in London, the son of Captain James Thomas Richard Lane Fox, of Hope Hall and Bramham Park, Yorkshire, and Lucy Frances Jane, daughter of Humphrey St John-Mildmay, a banker and MP for Southampton. He was the grandson of High Sheriff George Lane-Fox, and the great-grandson of George Lane-Fox, MP for Beverley.

He was educated at Eton and at New College, Oxford, and was called to the Bar, Inner Temple, in 1895.

== Career ==
Lane Fox was a militia officer in the 3rd (Militia) Battalion of the Yorkshire Regiment when in April 1902 he was commissioned a second lieutenant in the Yeomanry regiment the Yorkshire Hussars. He served with the regiment in the First World War, was wounded and mentioned in despatches and rose to the rank of lieutenant-colonel.

=== Political career ===
In the 1906 general election which produced a Liberal landslide, Barkston Ash was one of the few constituencies that went the other way. Lane Fox for the Conservatives defeated the Liberal incumbent Joseph Andrews who had defeated him in a by-election the previous year. He went on to represent the constituency until 1931. He served as Secretary for Mines from 1922 to 1924 and again from December 1924 (after the fall of the first Labour Government) until 1928. He was sworn of the Privy Council in 1926 and was a member of the Indian Statutory Commission.

On 24 July 1933 he was elevated to the peerage as Baron Bingley, of Bramham in the County of York.

== Personal life ==
In 1903, Lane-Fox was married to Mary Agnes Emily Wood (1877–1962), a daughter of Charles Wood, 2nd Viscount Halifax and sister of E. F. L. Wood, 1st Earl of Halifax. They had four daughters:

- Hon. Marcia Agnes Mary Lane Fox (1904–1980), who married Francis Gordon Ward Jackson in 1929. He later took the name Lane Fox by deed poll and served in World War II, becoming Honorary Col. of the Yorkshire Hussars.
- Hon. Mary Kathleen Lane Fox (1905–1981), who married Robert Bridgeman, 2nd Viscount Bridgeman in 1930.
- Hon. Dorothy Lane Fox (1909–1980), who married Sir Kenneth Wade Parkinson of Creskeld Hall.
- Hon. Margaret Lane Fox (1913–1986), who married Maj. Charles Packe, Royal Fusiliers, in 1939. After he was killed in action in Normandy in 1944, she married James Hunter in 1951. They divorced in 1956 and she married Brig. Kenneth Hargreaves in 1969.

Lord Bingley died in December 1947, aged 76. As he had no sons the barony died with him. Lady Bingley died in March 1962, aged 85. On the death of Lord Bingley, his eldest daughter and son-in-law took over the running of the Bramham Park estate.

== Family tree ==
Darcy–Lane–Fox–Pitt–Rivers family tree

Baron Darcy of Chiche, 1551
Thomas Darcy; 1506–1558; 1st Baron Darcy of Chiche
John Darcy c. 1532–1580/1581; 2nd Baron Darcy of Chiche
Viscount Colchester, 1621; Earl Rivers (2nd creation), 1626
Thomas Darcy; 1565–1640; 1st Earl Rivers, etc. 3rd Baron Darcy of Chiche
Earl Rivers (3rd creation) and Viscount Colchester, 1641 (for life)	Viscount Savage and Baron Darcy of Chiche, 1613
Elizabeth Savage; 1581–1650; Countess Savage, etc.	Thomas Savage d. 1635; 1st Viscount Savage, etc.
Earldom of Rivers (3rd creation) extinct, 1641
John Savage; 1603–1654; 2nd Earl Rivers, etc. 2nd Viscount Savage, etc.
Richard Lane d. 1668; 1st Baronet	George Pitt d. 1694	Jane Savage d. 1676	Thomas Savage; 1628–1694; 3rd Earl Rivers; 3rd Viscount Savage, etc.	Richard Savage
Viscount Lanesborough (1st creation), 1676
George Lane c. 1620–1683; 1st Viscount Lanesborough	George Pitt d. 1735	Richard Savage d. 1712; 4th Earl Rivers; 4th Viscount Savage, etc.	John Savage; 1665–1737; 5th Earl Rivers; 5th Viscount Savage, etc.
Baron Bingley (1st creation), 1713	Earldom of Rivers (2nd creation) and Viscount Savage and subsidiary titles extinct, 1737
Robert Benson c. 1676–1731; Baron Bingley	James Lane; 1650–1724; 2nd Viscount Lanesborough	Frances Lane d. 1674	Henry Fox; 1650-1719	George Pitt d. 1745
Barony of Bingley (1st creation) extinct, 1731	Viscountcy of Lanesborough (1st creation) extinct, 1724
Baron Bingley (2nd creation), 1763	Baron Rivers (3rd creation), 1776; Baron Rivers (4th creation), 11802
Harriet Benson d. 1771	George Fox-Lane c. 1697–1773; 1st Baron Bingley	Sackville Fox d. 1760	George Pitt; 1721–1803; 1st Baron Rivers
Robert Lane; 1732–1768; 2nd Baron Bingley	James Fox-Lane; 1756–1821	Marcia Lucy Pitt; 1756–1822	George Pitt; 1751–1828; 2nd Baron Rivers	Louisa Pitt d. 1791	Peter Beckford; 1740–1811
Barony of Bingley (2nd creation) extinct, 1768	Barony of Rivers (3rd creation) extinct but 4th creation continued, 1828
George Lane-Fox; 1793–1848	William Augustus Pitt Lane-Fox; 1796–1832	Sackville Lane-Fox; 1797–1874	William Horace Pitt-Rivers; 1777–1831; 3rd Baron Rivers
George Lane-Fox; 1816–1896	Augustus Pitt Rivers; 1827–1900	Sackville Lane-Fox; 1827–1888; 12th Baron Conyers	George Pitt-Rivers; 1810–1866; 4th Baron Rivers	Horace Pitt-Rivers; 1814–1880; 6th Baron Rivers
Barony of Rivers (4th creation) extinct, 1880
James Thomas Richard Lane-Fox; 1841–1906	Alexander Edward Lane Fox-Pitt-Rivers; 1855–1927	St George Lane Fox-Pitt; 1856–1932	William Augustus Lane Fox-Pitt b. 1858	Douglas Fox-Pitt; 1864–1922	Marcia Pelham; 1863–1926; 13th Baroness Conyers, Baroness Fauconberg	Violet Herbert; 1865–1929; Baroness Darcy de Knayth	Henry Peter Pitt-Rivers; 1849–1867; 5th Baron Rivers
Baron Bingley (3rd creation), 1933
George Lane-Fox; 1870–1947; 1st Baron Bingley	Edward Lane-Fox; 1874–1949	Emily Rachel Forster d. 1979	George Pitt-Rivers; 1890–1966	Rosalind Pitt-Rivers; 1907–1990	William Augustus Fitzgerald Lane Fox-Pitt; 1896–1988
Barony of Bingley (3rd creation) extinct, 1947
Baroness Lane-Fox, of Bramham in the County of West Yorkshire, 1981 (for life)
Marcia Agnes Mary Lane-Fox; 1904–1980	Francis Lane Fox; 1899–1989	James Henry Lane-Fox b. 1912	Felicity Lane-Fox; 1918–1988; Baroness Lane-Fox	Michael Pitt-Rivers; 1917–1999	Julian Pitt-Rivers; 1919–2001	George Anthony Lane-Fox Pitt-Rivers b. 1932	Valerie Pitt-Rivers b. 1939	William Oliver Lane Fox-Pitt; 1932–2012
Barony of Lane-Fox extinct, 1988
George Francis Lane Fox; 1931–2012	Robin Lane Fox b. 1946	William Fox-Pitt b. 1969
Baroness Lane-Fox, of Soho in the City of Westminster, 2013 (for life)
Edward Lane Fox b. 1976	Martha Lane Fox b. 1973; Baroness Lane-Fox

Parliament of the United Kingdom
Preceded by Joseph Andrews	Member of Parliament for Barkston Ash; 1906–1931	Succeeded by Sir Leonard Ropner, Bt
Political offices
Preceded by William Bridgeman	Secretary for Mines; 1922–1924	Succeeded by Manny Shinwell
Preceded by Manny Shinwell	Secretary for Mines; 1924–1928	Succeeded by Douglas King
Military offices
Preceded by The Lord Bolton	Honorary Colonel of the Yorkshire Hussars; 1924–1946	Succeeded by Thomas Preston
Peerage of the United Kingdom
New creation	Baron Bingley; 1934–1947	Extinct
