= George Pitt-Rivers =

British fascist and eugenicist (1890-1966)

- Born: 22 May 1890; London, England
- Died: 17 June 1966 (aged 76)
- Occupation: Anthropologist
- Spouse(s): Mary Hinton (m. 1915; div. 1930) Rosalind Venetia Henley (m. 1931; div. 1937)
- Partner: Stella Lonsdale
- Children: 3
- Parents: Alexander Edward Lane Fox-Pitt-Rivers (father); Alice Ruth Hermione Thynne (mother)
- Relatives: Augustus Pitt Rivers (paternal grandfather); Lord Henry Thynne (maternal grandfather); Michael Pitt-Rivers (son); Julian Pitt-Rivers (son); Valerie Pitt-Rivers (daughter-in-law)
- Military career
- Allegiance: United Kingdom
- Branch: British Army
- Service years: 1911-1918
- Rank: Captain
- Unit: 1st (Royal) Dragoons
- Conflicts: First World War; First Battle of Ypres

George Henry Lane-Fox Pitt-Rivers (22 May 1890 – 17 June 1966) was a British anthropologist and eugenicist who was a wealthy landowner in England in the interwar period. He embraced anti-Bolshevism and anti-Semitism and became a supporter of Oswald Mosley, which led to his being interned by the British government in the Second World War.

== Life ==
Pitt-Rivers was born in London, his birth registered under the surname Fox in Chesterfield. He was a son of Alexander Edward Lane Fox-Pitt-Rivers (2 November 1855 – 19 August 1927) and his wife Alice Ruth Hermione, daughter of Lord Henry Thynne. His father was the eldest son of Augustus Pitt Rivers, ethnologist and anthropologist and founder of the Pitt Rivers Museum, upon whose death in 1900 Alexander inherited the Pitt-Rivers estate. After Alexander died in 1927, the estate was inherited by George and it was so large that "it was said, albeit with exaggeration, that he could ride from coast to coast without leaving his own land".

=== Army service ===
Pitt-Rivers was an officer in the 1st (Royal) Dragoons. In November 1911, his regiment was sent to South Africa, being stationed in Johannesburg, the centre of the gold-mining industry of the Witwatersrand. In June 1913, the gold miners went on strike, demanding fewer hours and more pay. General Jan Smuts, the South African minister of defence and of finance, decided to use military force to end the strike, and on 4 July 1913 the Dragoons were ordered to break up a pro-strike rally in Market Square, Johannesburg, leading to a bout of extended fighting and rioting that lasted until the following day. Pitt-Rivers' precise role in the action in Johannesburg remains unclear, though as a junior officer he was certainly involved. In the aftermath, he took photographs of the burned-out buildings and the horses of the Dragoon Guards that had been killed during the shooting. The action in Johannesburg left him with a strong dislike of unions and the political left in general.

He took part in the First World War. On 23 August 1914, the Dragoons left South Africa for England and on 7 October 1914 arrived in Belgium. In October and November, the Dragoon Guards were involved in heavy fighting during the First Battle of Ypres. On 17 November 1914, Pitt-Rivers's knee was shattered by a German bullet, and he was sent to England for surgery and recuperation. He was promoted to captain in 1919.

=== Inter-war ===
With the ending of the war, Pitt-Rivers was in an insecure mood as he noted that the world that existed before 1914 would not return, and that the United Kingdom was entering a new age. In 1920 he published a book, with a preface by Oscar Levy, The World Significance of the Russian Revolution, the first of his anti-Bolshevik and anti-Semitic public activities. In it he wrote "the Jews are the principal agents of economic and political misery in the world, through their dealings in international finance and their actions in promoting democracy and revolution".

From 1922 to 1925, Pitt-Rivers held the position of Principal Secretary and Aide-de-Camp to his father-in-law Lord Forster, the Governor-General of Australia. He disliked Australia, which he found too democratic for his tastes, and spent as much time as possible out of the country on field research in New Zealand, New Guinea, the Bismarck Archipelago and elsewhere in the South Pacific. The focus on his anthropology studies in the Pacific was on "race extinction", "sex-ratio variances" and "culture extinction". His experience with the Māori people led to his lasting interest in anthropology, which he studied at Oxford under Bronisław Malinowski. Pitt-Rivers was described by the British historian Richard Griffins as being "obsessed" with racial questions which he believed to be the prime moving force in human history. In his entry in Who's Who, Pitt-Rivers described himself as having "established the methodology of the science of ethnogenics, interaction of race, population and culture". Influenced by scientific racism, Pitt-Rivers believed that Britain's principal problem was that people with, as he saw it, 'inferior' genes were having too many children, while the people with the "superior" genes were not. Alongside this belief was a vehement opposition to immigration as he believed that immigrants had inferior genes.

In 1927 he attended the World Population Conference and published a book Clash of Cultures and the Contact of Races. Two years later, Pitt-Rivers was elected a fellow of the Royal Anthropological Institute; he also represented the Eugenics Society at the International Federation of Eugenics Organizations. Within the Eugenics Society there was major debate between the followers of Marie Stopes who demanded unlimited birth control and an emphasis on female sexual pleasure for middle-class women, vs. those who found her approach too radical and likely to offend British public opinion. Pitt-Rivers backed the Stopes position of unlimited birth control as he shared her view that British working-class women should be encouraged to use birth control as a way to prevent them from passing on their presumably inferior genes to the next generation. In this way, Pitt-Rivers became estranged from the leaders of the Eugenics Society, who found his views too radical. In 1931, he published Weeds in the Garden of Marriage: The Ethics of Race and Our Captious Critics that attacked the institution of marriage in modern Britain from an euthenic perspective. From 1931 to 1937, Pitt-Rivers held the positions of Secretary General and Treasurer of the International Union for the Scientific Investigation of Population Problems, where he came into contact with German eugenicists Eugen Fischer and his assistant Lothar Loeffler. During this time, he also became involved in politics, praising the ideas of Benito Mussolini and Adolf Hitler. In the 1935 United Kingdom general election, he stood in North Dorset as an "Independent Agriculturist" with backing from the British Union of Fascists. Oswald Mosley and William Joyce spoke at rallies for him during the election.

An anti-Semitic conspiracy theorist, Pitt-Rivers was hostile towards Czechoslovakia, a state that he believed to have been founded as a result of a Jewish-Masonic conspiracy. In 1936, his visit to the Sudetenland was cut short when he was expelled from Czechoslovakia as a "trouble-maker". After his expulsion, Pitt-Rivers told the British press that he had been in the Sudetenland "working for Hitler". Likewise, Pitt-Rivers blamed the Spanish Civil War on "international Jewry". Pitt-Rivers was enraged by the abdication crisis of 1936 and supported the right of King Edward VIII to retain the throne and marry Mrs Wallis Simpson. On 25 December 1936, he wrote to the War Office saying he wanted to his name removed from the list of Army Reserve officers because he "was not prepared to serve in any capacity a Parliamentary despotism, now styled His Majesty's Government". In September 1937, he attended the Nazi Party rally at Nuremberg where he expressed "rabid anti-British views, preferably to German audiences". After his return to England, he always wore a golden swastika badge and claimed to be a close personal friend of Hitler. At the Authors' Club in London, he left around translations of Nazi propaganda into English. He visited Belgium to meet Léon Degrelle of the Rexist Party, and Spain to proclaim his support for the Nationalists in the Spanish Civil War.

Pitt-Rivers wrote two books about Czechoslovakia, The Czech Conspiracy: A Phrase in the World-War Plot (1938) and Czecho-Slovakia: The Naked Truth About the World-War Plot (1939). In The Czech Conspiracy, he wrote "the Czechs have been used as the tools and the decoy of the Comintern" as part of an effort to have Britain and France "fight a war of racial revenge as the ally of Bolshevik Russia". Much of the book was given over to proving that the Jewish community of Czechoslovakia dominated that state politically and economically. The founder of Czechoslovakia and its first president, Tomáš Masaryk, had been a Zionist and an opponent of anti-Semitism, and Pitt-Rivers quoted out of context several of Masaryk's statements to make it sound like he was serving Jewish interests. Pitt-Rivers was a member of The Link, a group which as its name suggests was meant to serve as a link to the NDSAP along with the British Council Against European Commitments headed by Lord Lymington. During the Sudetenland crisis, he visited Germany and upon his return gave a speech about the crisis at a meeting on 16 September 1938 that was hosted by the MP Michael Beaumont at Caxton Hall. Beaumont was embarrassed by Pitt-Rivers' speech to such an extent that he published a letter to The Jewish Chronicle on 7 October 1938 disavowing Pitt-Rivers and saying he "was no party to any racial dispute and opposed to any form of anti-Semitism". The Link was the fascist group most suspect to British officials. Pitt-Rivers was put under surveillance by MI5, which noted that William Joyce, Sir Oswald Mosley, General J. F. C. Fuller and Admiral Barry Domvile all made regular visits to Pitt-Rivers' Dorset estate at Hinton St Mary.

=== Second World War ===
After the declaration of war on Germany on 3 September 1939, the British government, fearful of German strategic bombing of British cities, ordered a mass evacuation of children from the cities to the countryside. Pitt-Rivers protested against plans to have some of the children stay with the tenant farmers on his Hinton St Mary estate and threatened to evict any tenants who took children into their homes. He sent out his private secretary, John Coast, to bully the tenant farmers into signing a petition opposing the plans to have children stay on the grounds of his estate on the grounds that the people from the cities were "East End Jews, Polish Jews and Czech Communists". Pitt-Rivers personally went out to threaten to evict the tenants who refused to sign his petition. During the Phoney War in the winter of 1939–1940, he took part in the meetings of the various "patriotic" (i.e. fascist) groups calling for a negotiated peace with Germany.

On 27 June 1940, Pitt-Rivers was arrested and interned under Defence Regulation 18B as a British Union of Fascists sympathiser. He was an unpopular landlord whose tenant farmers greatly feared him, and there were concerns that he would be lynched by his tenants in the event of a German invasion. He made a poor impression on the arresting constables who described him as a "pathetic, incoherent old man". Pitt-Rivers was held in Brixton Prison and Ascot internment centre (1940–1942).

== Skull cup ==
In 1946 Pitt-Rivers presented a silver-mounted skull cup to Worcester College, Oxford. The chalice was used as a drinking cup in the senior common room of the college. The object, inherited from his grandfather, Augustus Pitt Rivers, was created from a human skull adorned with a silver rim and stand. The silver hallmarks suggest the skull was made into a chalice in London in 1838, the year of the emancipation of the British West Indies. Carbon dating in c.2025 showed the skull was around 225 years old and circumstantial evidence suggest it came from the Caribbean and may have belonged to an enslaved woman, according to Dan Hicks, curator of world archaeology at the Pitt Rivers Museum. Augustus Pitt Rivers bought the skull at a Sotheby's auction in 1884 from the estate of W. J. Bernhard Smith who had collected weaponry and armour. Smith probably received it from his father who served in the Caribbean with the Royal Navy.

== Personal life ==
George Henry Lane-Fox Pitt-Rivers was twice married; firstly to Rachel Forster (daughter of the 1st Baron Forster) on 22 December 1915; the marriage was dissolved in 1930. They had two sons:

- Michael Pitt-Rivers (1917–1999), a West Country landowner who gained national notoriety in the 1950s when he was put on trial charged with sodomy.
- Julian Pitt-Rivers (1919–2001), a social anthropologist, ethnographer, and university professor.

Pitt-Rivers married, secondly, on 14 October 1931, Rosalind Venetia Henley (1907–1990), a biochemist, whose parents were Brigadier-General Anthony Morton Henley (1873–1925), a younger son of the 3rd Baron Henley, and Sylvia Laura Stanley, daughter of the 4th Baron Stanley of Alderley. Their marriage was dissolved in 1937. They had one child together:

- (George) Anthony (b. 1932); who married, in 1964, Valerie Scott, who was Lord Lieutenant of Dorset between 2006 and 2014.

Darcy–Lane–Fox–Pitt–Rivers family tree

Baron Darcy of Chiche, 1551
Thomas Darcy; 1506–1558; 1st Baron Darcy of Chiche
John Darcy c. 1532–1580/1581; 2nd Baron Darcy of Chiche
Viscount Colchester, 1621; Earl Rivers (2nd creation), 1626
Thomas Darcy; 1565–1640; 1st Earl Rivers, etc. 3rd Baron Darcy of Chiche
Earl Rivers (3rd creation) and Viscount Colchester, 1641 (for life)	Viscount Savage and Baron Darcy of Chiche, 1613
Elizabeth Savage; 1581–1650; Countess Savage, etc.	Thomas Savage d. 1635; 1st Viscount Savage, etc.
Earldom of Rivers (3rd creation) extinct, 1641
John Savage; 1603–1654; 2nd Earl Rivers, etc. 2nd Viscount Savage, etc.
Richard Lane d. 1668; 1st Baronet	George Pitt d. 1694	Jane Savage d. 1676	Thomas Savage; 1628–1694; 3rd Earl Rivers; 3rd Viscount Savage, etc.	Richard Savage
Viscount Lanesborough (1st creation), 1676
George Lane c. 1620–1683; 1st Viscount Lanesborough	George Pitt d. 1735	Richard Savage d. 1712; 4th Earl Rivers; 4th Viscount Savage, etc.	John Savage; 1665–1737; 5th Earl Rivers; 5th Viscount Savage, etc.
Baron Bingley (1st creation), 1713	Earldom of Rivers (2nd creation) and Viscount Savage and subsidiary titles extinct, 1737
Robert Benson c. 1676–1731; Baron Bingley	James Lane; 1650–1724; 2nd Viscount Lanesborough	Frances Lane d. 1674	Henry Fox; 1650-1719	George Pitt d. 1745
Barony of Bingley (1st creation) extinct, 1731	Viscountcy of Lanesborough (1st creation) extinct, 1724
Baron Bingley (2nd creation), 1763	Baron Rivers (3rd creation), 1776; Baron Rivers (4th creation), 11802
Harriet Benson d. 1771	George Fox-Lane c. 1697–1773; 1st Baron Bingley	Sackville Fox d. 1760	George Pitt; 1721–1803; 1st Baron Rivers
Robert Lane; 1732–1768; 2nd Baron Bingley	James Fox-Lane; 1756–1821	Marcia Lucy Pitt; 1756–1822	George Pitt; 1751–1828; 2nd Baron Rivers	Louisa Pitt d. 1791	Peter Beckford; 1740–1811
Barony of Bingley (2nd creation) extinct, 1768	Barony of Rivers (3rd creation) extinct but 4th creation continued, 1828
George Lane-Fox; 1793–1848	William Augustus Pitt Lane-Fox; 1796–1832	Sackville Lane-Fox; 1797–1874	William Horace Pitt-Rivers; 1777–1831; 3rd Baron Rivers
George Lane-Fox; 1816–1896	Augustus Pitt Rivers; 1827–1900	Sackville Lane-Fox; 1827–1888; 12th Baron Conyers	George Pitt-Rivers; 1810–1866; 4th Baron Rivers	Horace Pitt-Rivers; 1814–1880; 6th Baron Rivers
Barony of Rivers (4th creation) extinct, 1880
James Thomas Richard Lane-Fox; 1841–1906	Alexander Edward Lane Fox-Pitt-Rivers; 1855–1927	St George Lane Fox-Pitt; 1856–1932	William Augustus Lane Fox-Pitt b. 1858	Douglas Fox-Pitt; 1864–1922	Marcia Pelham; 1863–1926; 13th Baroness Conyers, Baroness Fauconberg	Violet Herbert; 1865–1929; Baroness Darcy de Knayth	Henry Peter Pitt-Rivers; 1849–1867; 5th Baron Rivers
Baron Bingley (3rd creation), 1933
George Lane-Fox; 1870–1947; 1st Baron Bingley	Edward Lane-Fox; 1874–1949	Emily Rachel Forster d. 1979	George Pitt-Rivers; 1890–1966	Rosalind Pitt-Rivers; 1907–1990	William Augustus Fitzgerald Lane Fox-Pitt; 1896–1988
Barony of Bingley (3rd creation) extinct, 1947
Baroness Lane-Fox, of Bramham in the County of West Yorkshire, 1981 (for life)
Marcia Agnes Mary Lane-Fox; 1904–1980	Francis Lane Fox; 1899–1989	James Henry Lane-Fox b. 1912	Felicity Lane-Fox; 1918–1988; Baroness Lane-Fox	Michael Pitt-Rivers; 1917–1999	Julian Pitt-Rivers; 1919–2001	George Anthony Lane-Fox Pitt-Rivers b. 1932	Valerie Pitt-Rivers b. 1939	William Oliver Lane Fox-Pitt; 1932–2012
Barony of Lane-Fox extinct, 1988
George Francis Lane Fox; 1931–2012	Robin Lane Fox b. 1946	William Fox-Pitt b. 1969
Baroness Lane-Fox, of Soho in the City of Westminster, 2013 (for life)
Edward Lane Fox b. 1976	Martha Lane Fox b. 1973; Baroness Lane-Fox

After the Second World War, Pitt-Rivers met Stella Lonsdale, who had been incarcerated in Paris by the Germans, suspected of being a British spy; when she eventually managed to make her way to England, she was imprisoned under suspicion of being a German spy. She became the mistress of Pitt-Rivers and took his surname, although they never married. Stella inherited substantial property from Pitt-Rivers when he died in 1966. In his will, he left instructions that any properties to be sold must be offered individually, rather than as an estate, in order that tenants might buy the properties they leased from the Pitt-Rivers Estate. Much of the village of Okeford Fitzpaine was thus sold to former tenants. Stella also sold a large proportion of the artefacts held in the Pitt-Rivers Museum at Farnham, Dorset, which she had also inherited from Pitt-Rivers.

== See also ==
- Cerne Abbas Giant
- British People's Party (1939)
- The Squatter's Daughter (Lambert)

== Literature ==
- Hart, Bradley W. (2015). George Pitt-Rivers and the Nazis. Bloomsbury Academic. ISBN 978-1-4725-6995-0.
- Griffiths, Richard (1980). Fellow Travellers of the Right British Enthusiasts for Nazi Germany, 1933-9. London: Constable. ISBN 0571271324.
- Griffiths, Richard (2016). What Did You Do During the War? The Last Throes of the British Pro-Nazi Right, 1940-45. London: Taylor & Francis. ISBN 9781317495659.
