= George Lane-Fox (MP) =

British landowner and Tory politician

Member of Parliament for Beverley
- In office 1837–1840 Serving with James Hogg
- Preceded by: Henry Burton; James Hogg
- Succeeded by: James Hogg; Sackville Lane-Fox
- In office 1820–1826 Serving with John Wharton
- Preceded by: John Wharton; Robert Christie Burton
- Succeeded by: John Stewart; Charles Harrison Batley

Personal details
- Born: 4 May 1793
- Died: 15 November 1848 (aged 55)
- Spouse: Georgiana Henrietta Buckley (m. 1814; died 1848)
- Relations: George Pitt, 1st Baron Rivers (grandfather)
- Children: 3
- Parent(s): James Fox-Lane; Hon. Mary Lucy Pitt
- Education: Westminster School
- Alma mater: Emmanuel College, Cambridge

George Lane-Fox (4 May 1793 – 15 November 1848), of Bramham Park, Yorkshire, was a British landowner and Tory politician.

== Early life ==
Lane-Fox was born on 4 May 1793. He was the eldest son of James Fox-Lane, of Bramham Park, Yorkshire, by the Hon. Mary Lucy Pitt, daughter of George Pitt, 1st Baron Rivers. He was the brother of Sackville Lane-Fox and the uncle of Sackville Lane-Fox, 12th Baron Conyers, and Augustus Pitt Rivers.

He was educated at Westminster before matriculating at Emmanuel College, Cambridge, in 1811.

== Career ==
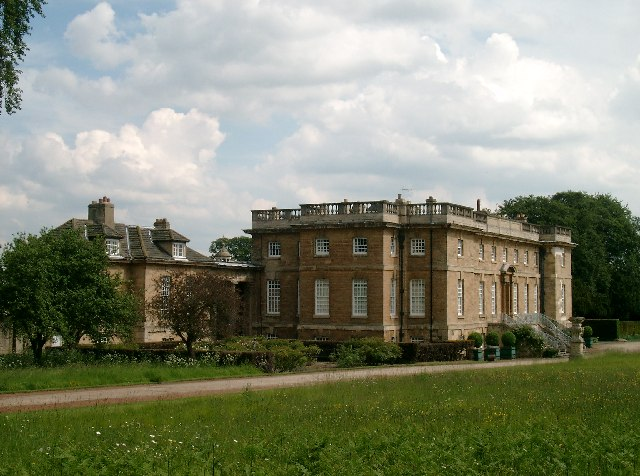
Bramham Park, Yorkshire.

His wealthy, but profligate, father James, a friend of George IV when he was the Prince of Wales, had inherited the extensive Bramham estate near Wetherby in 1773 from his uncle, the 1st Baron Bingley, and served as an inconspicuous Member for Horsham in Parliament. After his father's death in 1821, George became addicted to horse racing and "gambled away half his fortune" within a few months. After Bramham Hall was severely damaged by fire in 1828, he moved to Bowcliffe Hall.

Lane-Fox was returned to parliament for Beverley in 1820, a seat he held until 1826 and again between 1837 and 1840. His brother Sackville succeeded him in 1840.

== Personal life ==
On 20 September 1814, Lane-Fox was married to Georgiana Henrietta Buckley (1874–1894), a "society figure of dubious virtue" who was a daughter of Edward Pery Buckley, of Minestead Lodge, Hampshire, and the former Lady Georgiana West (a daughter of the 2nd Earl De La Warr) who had been a Lady of the Bedchamber to the royal princesses. Together, they had one son and two daughters, including:

- George Lane-Fox (1816–1896), High Sheriff of Leitrim and of Yorkshire who married Katherine Mary Stein, a daughter of John Stein, in 1814.
- Frederica Elizabeth Lane-Fox (1822–1867), who married Hon. Sir Adolphus Liddell, son of Thomas Liddell, 1st Baron Ravensworth, in 1845.

By early 1824, Lane-Fox and his wife were separated, but he sought a reconciliation two years later. Nevertheless, by the late 1820s, his wife "had a 'notorious' and indiscreet affair" with George Stanhope, 6th Earl of Chesterfield, who abandoned her in 1830 to marry Anne Weld Forester (a granddaughter of the 4th Duke of Rutland).

Lane-Fox died in November 1848, aged 55.

=== Descendants ===
Through his son George, he was the great-grandfather of George Lane-Fox, 1st Baron Bingley.

Lane–Fox–Pitt–Rivers family tree

Thomas Darcy, 1st Earl Rivers (died 1640)
Elizabeth Savage, Countess Rivers (1581–1650)	Thomas Savage, 1st Viscount Savage (died 1635)
John Savage, 2nd Earl Rivers (1603–1654)
Sir Richard Lane, 1st Baronet (died 1668)	George Pitt (died 1694)	Jane Savage (died 1676)	Thomas Savage, 3rd Earl Rivers (died 1694)	Richard Savage
George Lane, 1st Viscount Lanesborough (died 1683)	George Pitt (died 1735)	Richard Savage, 4th Earl Rivers (died 1712)	John Savage, 5th Earl Rivers (1665–1737)
James Lane, 2nd Viscount Lanesborough (1650–1724)	Robert Benson, 1st Baron Bingley (died 1731)	Frances Lane (died 1674)	Henry Fox (1650-1719)	George Pitt (died 1745)
Harriet Benson (died 1771)	George Fox-Lane, 1st Baron Bingley {died 1773)	Sackville Fox (died 1760)	George Pitt, 1st Baron Rivers (1721–1803)
Robert Lane (1732–1768)	James Fox-Lane (1756–1821)	Marcia Lucy Pitt (1756–1822)	George Pitt, 2nd Baron Rivers (1751–1828)	Louisa Pitt (died 1791)	Sir Peter Beckford (1740–1811)
George Lane-Fox (1793–1848)	William Augustus Pitt Lane-Fox (1796–1832)	Sackville Lane-Fox (1797–1874)	Horace Pitt-Rivers, 3rd Baron Rivers
George Lane-Fox (1816–1896)	Augustus Pitt Rivers (1827–1900)	Sackville Lane-Fox, 12th Baron Conyers (1827–1888)	George Pitt-Rivers, 4th Baron Rivers (1810–1866)	Horace Pitt-Rivers, 6th Baron Rivers (1814–1880)
James Thomas Richard Lane-Fox (1841–1906)	Alexander Edward Lane Fox-Pitt-Rivers (1855–1927)	St George Lane Fox-Pitt (1856–1932)	William Augustus Lane Fox-Pitt (1858– )	Douglas Fox-Pitt (1864–1922)	Marcia Pelham, Countess of Yarborough (1863–1926)	Violet Herbert, Countess of Powis (1865–1929)	Henry Pitt-Rivers, 5th Baron Rivers (1849–1867)
George Lane-Fox, 1st Baron Bingley (1870–1947)	Edward Lane-Fox (1874–1949)	Emily Rachel Forster (died 1979)	George Pitt-Rivers (1890–1966)	Rosalind Pitt-Rivers (1907–1990)	William Augustus Fitzgerald Lane Fox-Pitt (1896–1988)
Francis Lane Fox (1899–1989)	Marcia Agnes Mary Lane-Fox (1904–1980)	James Henry Lane-Fox (1912– )	Felicity Lane-Fox, Baroness Lane-Fox (1918–1988)	Michael Pitt-Rivers (1917–1999)	Julian Pitt-Rivers (1919–2001)	George Anthony Lane-Fox Pitt-Rivers (born 1932)	Valerie Pitt-Rivers (born 1939)	William Oliver Lane Fox-Pitt (1932–2012)
George Francis Lane Fox (1931–2012)	Robin Lane Fox (born 1946)	William Fox-Pitt (born 1969)
Edward Lane Fox (born 1976)	Martha Lane Fox (born 1973)

Parliament of the United Kingdom
Preceded by John Wharton; Robert Christie Burton	Member of Parliament for Beverley; 1820–1826; With: John Wharton	Succeeded by John Stewart; Charles Harrison Batley
Preceded by Henry Burton; James Hogg	Member of Parliament for Beverley; 1837–1840; With: James Hogg	Succeeded by James Hogg; Sackville Lane-Fox
