= James Fox-Lane =

British politician

Member of Parliament for Horsham
- In office 1801–1802 Serving with Sir John Macpherson
- Preceded by: Parliament of Great Britain
- Succeeded by: Edward Hilliard; Patrick Ross
- In office 1796–1800 Serving with Sir John Macpherson
- Preceded by: Lord William Gordon; William Fullarton
- Succeeded by: Parliament of the United Kingdom

Personal details
- Born: James Fox; August 1756
- Died: 7 April 1821 (aged 64)
- Spouse: Hon. Mary Lucy Pitt (m. 1789; died 1821)
- Relations: George Fox-Lane, 1st Baron Bingley (uncle)
- Children: 5
- Parent(s): Sackville Fox; Ann Holloway
- Education: St Marylebone School
- Alma mater: Christ's College, Cambridge

James Fox-Lane (August 1756 – 7 April 1821), known as James Fox until 1773, was an English landed gentleman, who represented Horsham in Parliament for six years.

== Early life ==
He was the eldest son of Sackville Fox of East Horsley, Surrey, and his wife Ann Holloway. His father died in 1760 and left him his estate in Surrey, worth about £1,300 per year.

Educated at Marylebone, he was admitted to Christ's College, Cambridge in 1771 and studied there until 1774. On 22 February 1773, he inherited the Bramham Park, Yorkshire estate of his paternal uncle George Fox-Lane, 1st Baron Bingley, and subsequently took the name of Fox-Lane.

== Career ==
Through extravagance as a youth he became indebted to the moneylender Robert Mackreth. Mackreth bought Fox-Lane's Surrey estate very shortly after James came of age in 1777 and resold it for a handsome profit. He attempted to buy the Yorkshire estate as well, but the sale was cancelled by the Court of Chancery. Fox-Lane subsequently retained John Scott as counsel and sued Mackreth, alleging that Mackreth had defrauded him, and that the transactions had begun while Fox-Lane was still a minor. His suit was successful, and he was awarded the purchase money of the Surrey estate with interest and costs, totaling about £20,000. Mackreth appealed, but the verdict was upheld by the Lord Chancellor and, in 1791, the House of Lords.

On 5 May 1790, Fox-Lane was commissioned a lieutenant in the Dorset Militia, of which his father-in-law was colonel.

=== Political career ===
Although he had joined Brooks's Club, famously a society of Whigs, Fox-Lane had little interest in politics. Frances, the Dowager Viscountess of Irvine, was one of his Yorkshire neighbours, and in the 1796 election, returned him for one of the seats she controlled at Horsham. No known speech or vote on his part survives, and he did not stand at the 1802 election.

== Personal life ==
On 23 July 1789, Fox-Lane married Hon. Marcia Lucy Pitt (1756–1822), the daughter of British diplomat and politician George Pitt, 1st Baron Rivers and the former Penelope Atkins (a daughter of Sir Henry Atkins, 4th Baronet). They had four sons and one daughter:

- Marcia Bridget Lane-Fox (1792–1826), who married Hon. Sir Edward Vavasour, 1st Baronet, a son of Charles Stourton, 17th Baron Stourton and Hon. Mary Langdale (a daughter of the 5th Baron Langdale), in 1813.
- George Lane-Fox (1793–1848), MP for Beverley who married Georgiana Henrietta Buckley, a daughter of Edward Percy Buckley and the former Lady Georgiana West (a daughter of the 2nd Earl De La Warr), in 1814.
- William Augustus Pitt Lane-Fox (1796–1832), Grenadier Guards, who married Lady Caroline Douglas, sister of George Douglas, 17th Earl of Morton and daughter of Hon. John Douglas (a son of the 14th Earl of Morton) and Lady Frances Lascelles (a daughter of the 1st Earl of Harewood).
- Sackville Lane-Fox (1797–1874), who married Lady Charlotte Osborne, a daughter of George Osborne, 6th Duke of Leeds and Lady Charlotte Townshend (a daughter of the 1st Marquess Townshend), in 1826.
- Rev. Thomas Henry Lane-Fox (1798–1861), vicar of Sturminster Newton.

He died on 7 April 1821, his health having declined for some time, and left an estate worth £120,000.

=== Descendants ===
Through his eldest son George, he was a grandfather of George Lane-Fox, the High Sheriff of Leitrim and of Yorkshire who married Katherine Mary Stein (a daughter of John Stein).

Through his son William he was a grandfather of Augustus Pitt Rivers, a prominent English ethnologist, and archaeologist.

== Family tree ==
Lane–Fox–Pitt–Rivers family tree

Thomas Darcy, 1st Earl Rivers (died 1640)
Elizabeth Savage, Countess Rivers (1581–1650)	Thomas Savage, 1st Viscount Savage (died 1635)
John Savage, 2nd Earl Rivers (1603–1654)
Sir Richard Lane, 1st Baronet (died 1668)	George Pitt (died 1694)	Jane Savage (died 1676)	Thomas Savage, 3rd Earl Rivers (died 1694)	Richard Savage
George Lane, 1st Viscount Lanesborough (died 1683)	George Pitt (died 1735)	Richard Savage, 4th Earl Rivers (died 1712)	John Savage, 5th Earl Rivers (1665–1737)
James Lane, 2nd Viscount Lanesborough (1650–1724)	Robert Benson, 1st Baron Bingley (died 1731)	Frances Lane (died 1674)	Henry Fox (1650-1719)	George Pitt (died 1745)
Harriet Benson (died 1771)	George Fox-Lane, 1st Baron Bingley {died 1773)	Sackville Fox (died 1760)	George Pitt, 1st Baron Rivers (1721–1803)
Robert Lane (1732–1768)	James Fox-Lane (1756–1821)	Marcia Lucy Pitt (1756–1822)	George Pitt, 2nd Baron Rivers (1751–1828)	Louisa Pitt (died 1791)	Sir Peter Beckford (1740–1811)
George Lane-Fox (1793–1848)	William Augustus Pitt Lane-Fox (1796–1832)	Sackville Lane-Fox (1797–1874)	Horace Pitt-Rivers, 3rd Baron Rivers
George Lane-Fox (1816–1896)	Augustus Pitt Rivers (1827–1900)	Sackville Lane-Fox, 12th Baron Conyers (1827–1888)	George Pitt-Rivers, 4th Baron Rivers (1810–1866)	Horace Pitt-Rivers, 6th Baron Rivers (1814–1880)
James Thomas Richard Lane-Fox (1841–1906)	Alexander Edward Lane Fox-Pitt-Rivers (1855–1927)	St George Lane Fox-Pitt (1856–1932)	William Augustus Lane Fox-Pitt (1858– )	Douglas Fox-Pitt (1864–1922)	Marcia Pelham, Countess of Yarborough (1863–1926)	Violet Herbert, Countess of Powis (1865–1929)	Henry Pitt-Rivers, 5th Baron Rivers (1849–1867)
George Lane-Fox, 1st Baron Bingley (1870–1947)	Edward Lane-Fox (1874–1949)	Emily Rachel Forster (died 1979)	George Pitt-Rivers (1890–1966)	Rosalind Pitt-Rivers (1907–1990)	William Augustus Fitzgerald Lane Fox-Pitt (1896–1988)
Francis Lane Fox (1899–1989)	Marcia Agnes Mary Lane-Fox (1904–1980)	James Henry Lane-Fox (1912– )	Felicity Lane-Fox, Baroness Lane-Fox (1918–1988)	Michael Pitt-Rivers (1917–1999)	Julian Pitt-Rivers (1919–2001)	George Anthony Lane-Fox Pitt-Rivers (born 1932)	Valerie Pitt-Rivers (born 1939)	William Oliver Lane Fox-Pitt (1932–2012)
George Francis Lane Fox (1931–2012)	Robin Lane Fox (born 1946)	William Fox-Pitt (born 1969)
Edward Lane Fox (born 1976)	Martha Lane Fox (born 1973)

Parliament of Great Britain
Preceded by Lord William Gordon; William Fullarton	Member of Parliament for Horsham; 1796–1800; With: Sir John Macpherson	Succeeded by Parliament of the United Kingdom
Parliament of the United Kingdom
Preceded by Parliament of Great Britain	Member of Parliament for Horsham; 1801–1802; With: Sir John Macpherson	Succeeded by Edward Hilliard; Patrick Ross
