= Henry Burton-Peters =

British politician (1792-1874)

Member of the British Parliament for Beverley
- In office 1830–1837

Personal details
- Born: 12 January 1792
- Died: 24 November 1874 (aged 82)

Henry Burton-Peters (12 January 1792 – 24 November 1874) was a British politician who sat in the House of Commons from 1830 to 1837.

Peters was the son of Henry Peters and Charlotte Mary Morrison (daughter of General George Morrison).

In 1830, Burton-Peters was elected as a Member of Parliament (MP) for Beverley. He held the seat until 1837.

Burton-Peters married three times. He married his third wife, Mary Cartwright, in 1870. They lived at 35 Brock Street, Bath.

Parliament of the United Kingdom
Preceded by John Stewart; Charles Harrison Batley	Member of Parliament for Beverley; 1830 – 1837; With: Daniel Sykes 1830–1831; William Marshall 1831–1832; Hon. Charles Langdale 1832–1835; James Hogg from 1835	Succeeded by George Lane-Fox; James Hogg
