= Edward Hilliard (MP) =

Edward Hilliard (c. 1754 – 18 December 1815) was a barrister-at-law and from 1802 to 1806 a Member of Parliament for Horsham.

Edward Hilliard of Cowley House, near Uxbridge, was the oldest son of Edward Hilliard of St Clement Danes, London. Edward Hilliard (the younger) received legal training at the Inner Temple beginning in 1769 and in 1775 was called to bar at Lincoln's Inn. On 14 August 1779 e married Elizabeth Stafford (who died 23 August 1800 in the child-bed of her 16th child) and then married on 24 September 1801 the widow Hannah Colborne. He purchased in 1786 one part of the manor of Cowley and then the other part in 1789. On 4 April 1803 he opposed a petition against the St Pancras workhouse bill (that the "... Appellants may have such other Relief in the Premises as to this House ...") and protested that the bill was, in his words, "absolutely necessary".
