= John Stewart (Beverley MP) =

British politician

John Stewart (1784–1873), of Belladrum, Inverness was a British politician.

He was a Member (MP) of the Parliament of the United Kingdom for Beverley 1826–1830.
