= Felicity Lane-Fox, Baroness Lane-Fox =

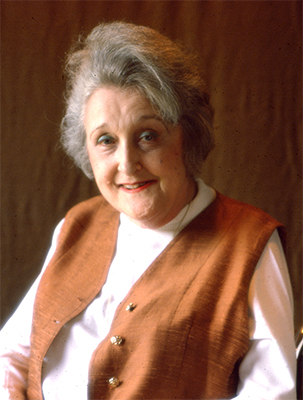
Baroness Lane-Fox photographed by Ken Stewart whilst on holiday at Netley Waterside House, Netley Abbey, Southampton between 1976 and 1986 date unknown

Felicity Lane-Fox, Baroness Lane-Fox, OBE (22 June 1918 – 17 April 1988) was a Conservative member of the House of Lords and champion of disability issues.

She was born in Tadcaster, Yorkshire, the daughter of Edward Lane-Fox, who was brother of George Lane-Fox, 1st Baron Bingley. At the age of 12 she was paralysed by an attack of poliomyelitis. Despite these difficulties, she and her parents enjoyed family activities together; in September 1945, they reportedly attended horse-related events at their family seat, Bramham Park, alongside Countess Wharncliffe, Sir George Martin, Mr and Mrs Middleton Joy and other society members. Like the Baroness, her family were supporters of the Conservative Party for which they reportedly held fund-raising events at Bramham Park in the 1930s.

In 1963 she became a member of the executive of the National Union of Conservative and Unionist Associations. In the 1976 New Year Honours she was appointed OBE for services to disabled people.

On 19 May 1981 she was created a life peer, as Baroness Lane-Fox, of Bramham in the County of West Yorkshire. Using an electric wheelchair, she was an active member of the House of Lords until her death. She was the aunt of Robin Lane Fox and great-aunt of his daughter, Martha Lane Fox, Baroness Lane-Fox of Soho.
