= Henry Pitt-Rivers, 5th Baron Rivers =

Henry Peter Pitt-Rivers, 5th Baron Rivers (7 April 1849 – 17 March 1867) was a British nobleman. He died at a young age of the lung disease from which his three older brothers had also suffered.

Henry was the youngest of four sons born to George Pitt-Rivers, 4th Baron Rivers and his wife Lady Susan, all of whom suffered from a chronic lung disease. He was born on 7 April 1849 and baptized on 30 April at St George's, Hanover Square. After the death of his brother Granville in 1855, the family felt it was best to separate Henry, who was as yet less affected than his remaining brother William, from the family, and he was raised for several years by Sydney Osborne and his wife. William died in 1859, so when their father died on 28 April 1866, Henry succeeded to the title and estates. His disease had progressed upon him, however, and he died on 17 March 1867 at Torquay of "congestion of the lungs". He was buried on 23 March at Steepleton Iwerne, and was succeeded in his title and estates by his uncle, Lt-Col. Horace Pitt.

Peerage of the United Kingdom
Preceded by George Pitt-Rivers	Baron Rivers; 1866–1867	Succeeded by Horace Pitt-Rivers
