= Rosalind Pitt-Rivers =

British biochemist

- Born: Rosalind Venetia Henley; 4 March 1907; 18 Mansfield Street, London, England
- Died: 14 January 1990 (aged 82); Hinton St Mary, Dorset, England
- Other name: Rosalind Venetia Lane Fox Pitt-Rivers
- Education: Bedford College
- Spouse: George Pitt-Rivers (m. 1931; div. 1937)
- Children: 1
- Relatives: Valerie Pitt-Rivers (daughter-in-law); Venetia Stanley (aunt); Anthony Henley, 3rd Baron Henley (grandfather); Edward Stanley, 4th Baron Stanley of Alderley (grandfather)
- Awards: FRS (1954)
- Scientific career
- Fields: Biochemistry
- Workplaces: National Institute for Medical Research

Rosalind Venetia Lane Fox Pitt-Rivers FRS (née Henley; 4 March 1907 – 14 January 1990) was a British biochemist. She became the second president of the European Thyroid Association in 1971, succeeding Jean Roche and preceding Jack Gross in the position; the three played a role in the discovery of the thyroid hormone triiodothyronine (T_{3}).

== Early life and education ==
Pitt-Rivers was born Rosalind Venetia Henley on 4 March 1907 at 18 Mansfield Street, London to the Hon. Anthony Morton Henley (1873–1925), a British Army Captain and later Brigadier General, and the Hon. Sylvia Laura Henley (née Stanley; 1882–1980), a belletrist. The paternal granddaughter of Anthony Henley, 3rd Baron Henley, through her mother she was the granddaughter of the educationist Edward Stanley, 4th Baron Stanley of Alderley and the niece of the socialite Venetia Stanley.

Educated at home by a governess until the age of thirteen, Henley subsequently attended Notting Hill High School. Her interest in chemistry began at the age of twelve when an uncle gave her a chemistry set. Later studying chemistry at Bedford College, the then women's college of the University of London, she was encouraged by her teachers to pursue a career in scientific research. Awarded a Bachelor's with first-class honours in 1930, Henley gained her Master's the following year.

== Career ==
After she separated from Pitt-Rivers in 1937, she returned to study and gained a PhD in biochemistry from University College medical school in 1939. She joined the scientific staff of the National Institute for Medical Research (NIMR) in Mill Hill London in 1942, the largest institute of the UK Medical Research Council (MRC). She later became head of the Division of Chemistry, and retired in 1972.

After working with Jack Gross on the discovery of the T_{3} hormone and publishing their findings in The Lancet in 1952, she gained international recognition. She was elected a Fellow of the Royal Society (FRS) in 1954. In 1973 she was made a fellow of Bedford College, London, in 1983 an honorary fellow of the Royal Society of Medicine, and in 1986 an honorary fellow of the Royal College of Physicians. Her publications with Jamshed Tata include The Thyroid Hormones (1959); The Chemistry of Thyroid Diseases (1960); and (with W. R. Trotter) The Thyroid Gland (1964).

== Personal life ==
In 1931, she married, as his second wife, George Pitt-Rivers (1890–1966), anthropologist and eugenicist, one of the richest men in England and a grandson of Augustus Pitt Rivers (1827–1900), who founded the anthropology museum named after him in Oxford. She became stepmother to the two sons from his first marriage, Michael and Julian. She gave birth to a son, Anthony Pitt-Rivers, in 1932, but the marriage was dissolved in 1937.

During their marriage, her husband had become increasingly pro-eugenics and antisemitic, drawing closer to German eugenicists and praising Mussolini and Hitler; by 1940 he was interned under Defence Regulation 18B.

She died on 14 January 1990, aged 82, at Hinton St Mary, Dorset, England.
