= Robert Benson, Baron Bingley =

English Tory politician

The Right Honourable The Lord Bingley PC
- Portrait miniature by Andreas von Behn, c. 1704

Chancellor of the Exchequer
- In office 1711–1713
- Preceded by: The Earl of Oxford and Earl Mortimer
- Succeeded by: Sir William Wyndham

Personal details
- Born: 1676
- Died: 9 April 1731 (aged 54–55)
- Education: Christ's College, Cambridge
- Occupation: politician

Robert Benson, Baron Bingley, PC (c. 1676 – 9 April 1731) was an English Tory politician who sat in the English and British House of Commons from 1702 until 1713 when he was raised to the peerage as Baron Bingley and sat in the House of Lords. He served as Chancellor of the Exchequer from 1711 to 1713.

== Life ==
Robert Benson was born in Wakefield, the son of Robert Benson of Wrenthorpe. He went to school in London before studying at Christ's College, Cambridge. He served as an alderman of the city of York and was elected Lord Mayor of York for 1707. He was elected Member of Parliament for Thetford in Norfolk from 1702 to 1705, then becoming MP for York from 1705 to 1713.

In 1711, he was sworn of the Privy Council and became Chancellor of the Exchequer until 1713. He was a Director of the South Sea Company from July 1711 to February 1715. In 1713 he was ennobled as Baron Bingley, and became the British ambassador to Spain.

Benson founded the stately home of Bramham Park, near Wetherby. When he died in 1731 he was buried in Westminster Abbey and the title Baron Bingley became extinct, although it was later re-created for his son-in-law. He had married Lady Elizabeth, the daughter of Heneage Finch, 1st Earl of Aylesford, and had a son (who predeceased him) and two daughters (one illegitimate). It has often been suggested that Bingley was also the real father of the British soldier, dramatist and politician John Burgoyne, whose debts he cancelled in his will. What was left of his estate, including Bramham Park, went to his daughter Harriet who had married George Fox.

== Notes ==
Parliament of England
Preceded by Sir Thomas Hanmer, Bt; Sir John Wodehouse, Bt	Member of Parliament for Thetford; 1702–1705; With: Edmund Soame	Succeeded by Sir Thomas Hanmer, Bt; Sir John Wodehouse, Bt
Preceded by Sir William Robinson, Bt; Tobias Jenkins	Member of Parliament for York; 1705–1708; With: Sir William Robinson, Bt	Succeeded by Parliament of Great Britain
Parliament of Great Britain
Preceded by Parliament of England	Member of Parliament for York; 1708–1713; With: Sir William Robinson, Bt	Succeeded by Sir William Robinson, Bt; Robert Fairfax
Political offices
Preceded by The Earl of Oxford and Earl Mortimer	Chancellor of the Exchequer; 1711–1713	Succeeded by Sir William Wyndham, Bt
Preceded by Paul Methuen	Treasurer of the Household; 1730–1731	Succeeded by The Lord De La Warr
Peerage of Great Britain
New creation	Baron Bingley; 1713–1731	extinct
