= Martha Lane Fox =

British businesswoman (born 1973); member of the House of Lords

The Right Honourable The Baroness Lane-Fox of Soho CBE HonFREng
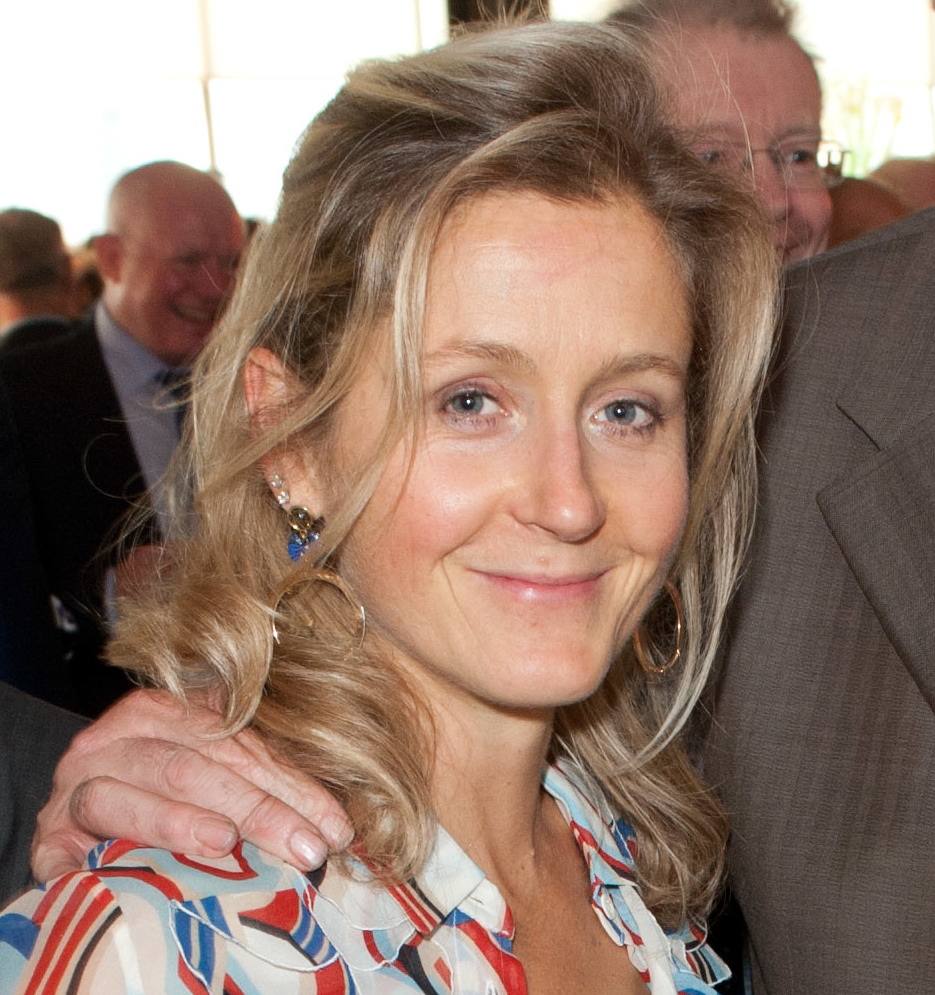
- Lane Fox in 2013

Chancellor of the Open University
- Incumbent
- Assumed office 12 March 2014
- Preceded by: The Lord Puttnam

Member of the House of Lords
- Lord Temporal
- Life peerage 25 March 2013

Personal details
- Born: Martha Lane Fox; 10 February 1973 (age 53) London, England
- Party: None (crossbencher)
- Parent: Robin Lane Fox (father)
- Education: Oxford High School, Oxford; Westminster School; University of Oxford (BA)
- Occupation: Entrepreneur, life peer
- Website: Martha Lane Fox on LinkedIn

Martha Lane Fox, Baroness Lane-Fox of Soho (Note: Her title is hyphenated, whereas her surname is not.) (born 10 February 1973) is a British businesswoman, philanthropist and public servant. She co-founded Last Minute during the dotcom boom of the early 2000s and has subsequently served on public service digital projects. She sits on the boards of WeTransfer and Chanel, as well as being a trustee of The Queen's Commonwealth Trust. She previously served on the board of Channel 4.

She entered the House of Lords as a crossbencher on 26 March 2013, becoming its youngest female member; she was appointed Chancellor of the Open University on 12 March 2014. In October 2019, she was named by media and marketing publication The Drum as the most influential woman in Britain's digital sector from the past quarter of a century.

== Education and early life ==
Born in London, Lane Fox is the daughter of classicist, ancient historian from Oxford University and gardening correspondent of The Financial Times, Robin Lane Fox, the scion of an English landed gentry family seated at Bramham Park. She was privately educated at Oxford High School, an all-girls school in Oxford, and at Westminster School in London with a coeducational sixth form. She studied Ancient and Modern History at the University of Oxford where she was an undergraduate student of Magdalen College, Oxford, graduating with a lower second-class honours Bachelor of Arts (BA) degree; as per tradition, her BA was promoted to a Master of Arts (MA) degree.

== Career ==
Lane Fox joined information technology and media consulting firm Spectrum, where she met Brent Hoberman. In 1998, Lane Fox and Hoberman founded Last Minute, an online travel and gift business. She stepped down as managing director in 2003. Last Minute was bought by Sabre Holdings in 2005.

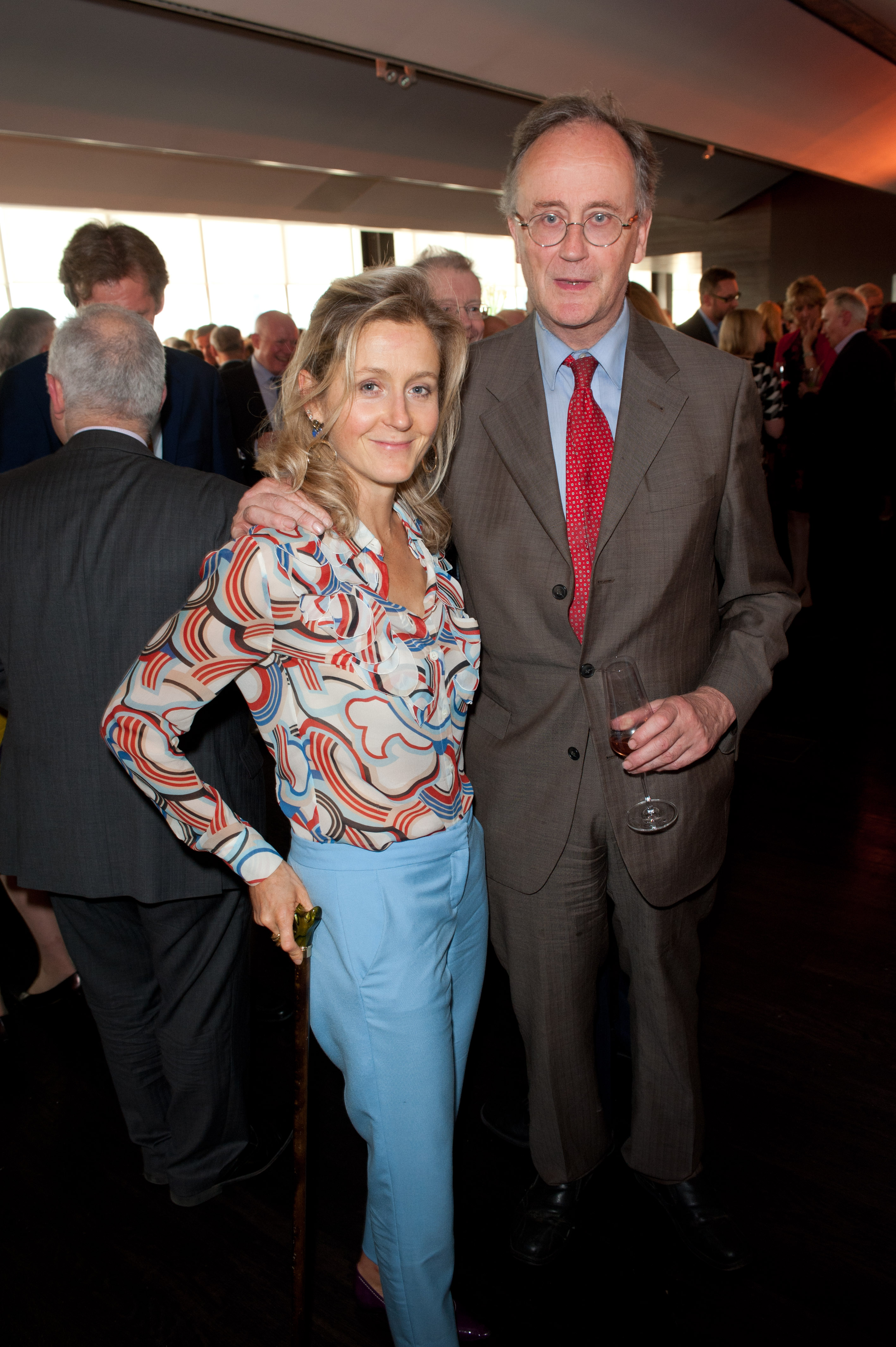
Lady Lane-Fox with her father Robin Lane Fox, 2013

Following her departure from Last Minute, Lane Fox was tipped to take over day-to-day operations at Selfridges but was involved in a car accident before she could assume that role. At the suggestion of advertising executive Julian Douglas, Fox teamed up with Nick Thistleton to launch karaoke company Lucky Voice. In 2007, Lane Fox joined the board of Marks & Spencer.

From 2009 to 2013, she was the Digital Champion for the UK and helped to create the Government Digital Service – this team launched gov.uk, and was given the task of spearheading a two-year campaign to improve computer literacy. The following year she was assigned to establish the Digital Public Services Unit within the Cabinet Office. and invited to sit on the Cabinet Office Efficiency and Reform Board. The following month Lane Fox was honoured by David Cameron for her "Manifesto for a Networked Nation", a challenge to increase British internet engagement. She resigned from her position as Digital Champion in late 2013.

She entered the House of Lords as a crossbencher on 26 March 2013, becoming its youngest female member. In her maiden speech, she addressed the need for digital literacy in all sectors of the economy. That same year the Open University appointed her as its Chancellor. She is stepping down from this position in 2026. In the run-up to the Scottish independence referendum of 2014, Lane Fox signed an open letter opposing Scottish independence.

In 2017, Lady Lane-Fox was appointed a member of the Joint Committee on National Security Strategy. In 2018, she was appointed Non-Executive Director of Chanel as well as Donmar Warehouse and a Trustee of the Queen's Commonwealth Trust. Lane Fox continues to be a Patron of AbilityNet, Reprieve, Camfed and Just for Kids Law. She was on the board of social networking company Twitter, Inc. from June 2016 until its takeover by Elon Musk in October 2022. In 2020, Lane Fox was appointed to the board of directors of the company WeTransfer. She was appointed president of the British Chambers of Commerce in October 2022. In November 2024, Lane-Fox joined the board of Multiverse, a British apprenticeships company co-founded and led by Euan Blair.

=== Charity work ===
Lady Lane-Fox is an advocate for such causes as human rights, women's rights, and social justice. In 2007, she founded Antigone, a grant-making trust to support charities based in the United Kingdom. She is a patron of Reprieve, a legal action charity, and CAMFED, an organization dedicated to fighting poverty, HIV, and AIDS in rural Africa through an emphasis on education of young women. She is also patron of the charity Just for Kids Law, which supports children and young people in London, as well as fighting for wider reform on behalf of young people across the UK.

When the telecommunications company Orange withdrew its longstanding support for the Orange Prize, Lane Fox was one of several benefactors, along with Cherie Blair and Joanna Trollope, who offered to sustain the contest until another major sponsor could be found.

=== Honours and awards ===
Lane Fox was appointed Commander of the Most Excellent Order of the British Empire (CBE) in the 2013 New Year Honours for "services to the digital economy and charity". In February 2013 she was assessed to be one of the 100 most powerful women in the United Kingdom by Woman's Hour on BBC Radio 4. In the same month it was announced that she was to be created a life peer to sit as a crossbencher in the House of Lords. She was also recognized as one of the BBC's 100 women of 2013.

On 25 March 2013, she was created a Life Peer as Baroness Lane-Fox of Soho, of Soho in the City of Westminster, and was introduced in the House of Lords the next day. On 29 October 2015, Lane Fox was ranked 15th on the Richtopia list of 100 Most Influential British Entrepreneurs. In February 2016, Lane Fox was elected a Distinguished Fellow of BCS, The Chartered Institute for IT, after being nominated by The Duke of Kent. (Note: Burke's Peerage & Baronetage: LANE-FOX OF SOHO, LP "Arms: Quarterly, 1st and 4th, ermine a chevron between three foxes' heads erased gules (for FOX); 2nd and 3rd, argent a lion rampant gules within a bordure sable on a canton azure a harp and crown or (for LANE). Motto: Faire sans dire (Actions not words). Creation: Baroness (Life Peer, United Kingdom) 25 March 2013. MARTHA LANE FOX, BARONESS LANE-FOX, created a Life Peer as Baroness Lane-Fox of Soho, in the City of Westminster 2013, CBE (2013) (The Rt Hon The Baroness Lane-Fox CBE, House of Lords, London SW1A 0PW), founder and Chairwoman of Doteveryone.org.uk 2015–, co-founder of Lastminute.com (MD 2000–03), non-executive director of Marks & Spencer plc 2007–16, Director of Twitter Inc 2016–, Chancellor of The Open University 2014–, Trustee of The Queen's Commonwealth Trust 2018–, born at London 10 February 1973, educated at Oxford High School, Westminster School, and Magdalen College Oxford (MA), DFBCS (2016). Lineage of LANE-FOX: (see BLG 1965 LANE-FOX of Bramham Park)")

In October 2019, Lane Fox was named by media and marketing publication The Drum, in association with the Futures Network, Innovate Her and WACL, as the most influential woman in Britain's digital sector from the past quarter of a century. She was elected an Honorary Fellow of the Royal Academy of Engineering in 2023.

=== Arms ===
Coat of arms of Martha Lane Fox
Notes Style: The Lady Lane-Fox of Soho; Shield: displayed on a lozenge Adopted 2013 Coronet Coronet of a baroness Crest Not applicable Escutcheon Quarterly: 1st and 4th Ermine a Chevron between three Foxes' Heads erased Gules (Fox); 2nd and 3rd Argent a Lion rampant Gules with a Bordure Sable and on a Canton Azure a Harp and Crown Or (Lane). Motto "Faire sans dire" Orders The Order of the British Empire circlet. FOR GOD AND THE EMPIRE

== Personal life ==
Lane Fox lives in Marylebone, London, with her partner Chris Gorell Barnes. Their identical twin sons, Milo and Felix, were born in 2016. In May 2004, she was severely injured in a car accident in the tourist resort of Essaouira in Morocco and was flown to England for treatment at John Radcliffe Hospital, Oxford, and later Wellington Hospital in London. She was discharged from hospital in December 2005.

== See also ==
- Lane Fox family
- Fox family
- Felicity Lane-Fox, Baroness Lane-Fox

=== Further reading ===
- Burke's Landed Gentry (1965 Edn): LANE FOX of Bramham Park
