= Robert Lane (died 1768) =

British Member of Parliament

Robert Lane (5 August 1732 – May 1768) was a British Member of Parliament.

He was the only son of George Fox, MP for York, who adopted the name of Lane in 1750. He was an unsuccessful candidate to join his father as MP for York in 1758, but was elected unopposed when his father retired at the 1761 general election. Lane did not stand at the next general election in 1768 due to ill-health, and he died in May that year. He married twice, but had no children.
