= Robin Lane Fox =

British historian, educator and writer (born 1946)

Robin Lane Fox FRSL
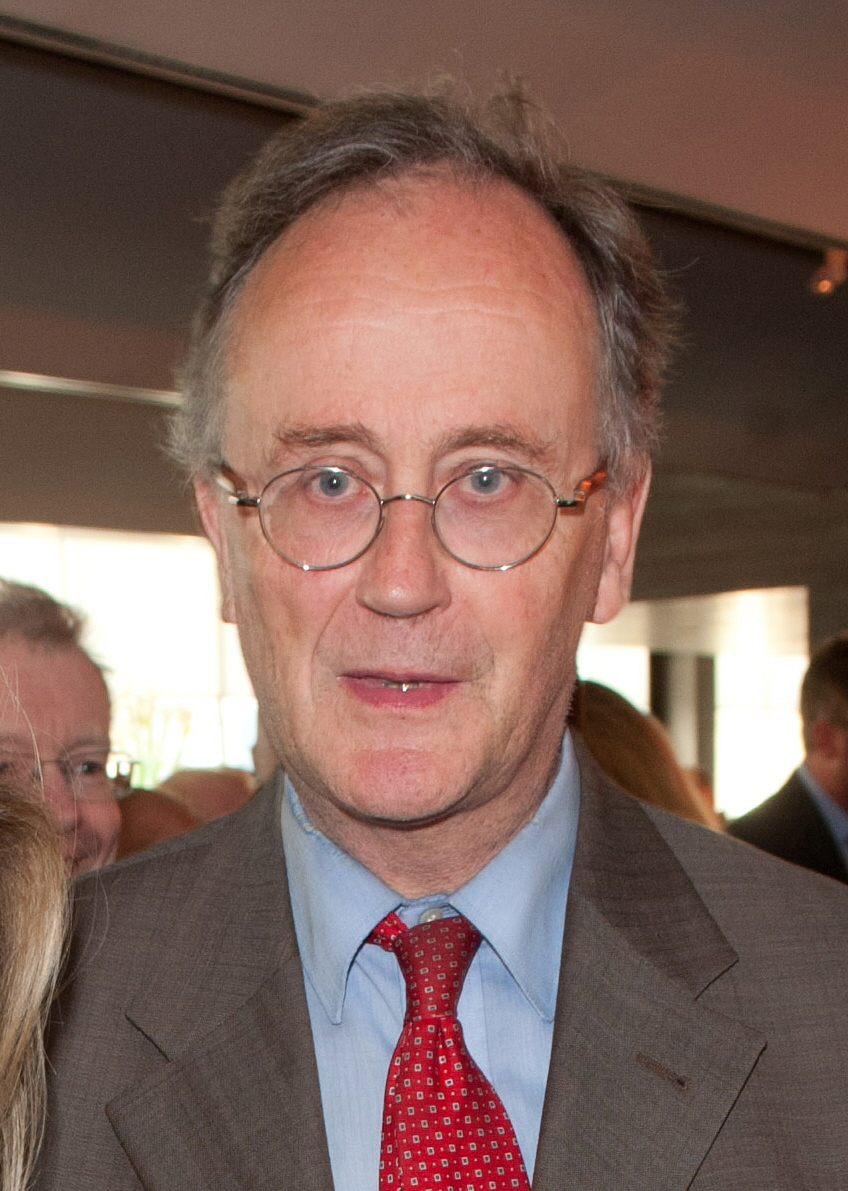
- Robin Lane Fox at Financial Times 125th Anniversary Party, London, in June 2013
- Born: Robin James Lane Fox; 5 October 1946 (age 80)
- Education: Eton College; Magdalen College, Oxford
- Occupations: Educator, author
- Known for: Historian of classical antiquity
- Children: Martha; Henry

Robin James Lane Fox, FRSL (born 5 October 1946) is an English classicist, ancient historian, and gardening writer known for his works on Alexander the Great. Lane Fox is an Emeritus Fellow of New College, Oxford, and Reader in Ancient History, University of Oxford. Fellow and Tutor in Ancient History at New College from 1977 to 2014, he serves as Garden Master and as Extraordinary Lecturer in Ancient History for both New College and Exeter College. He has also taught Greek and Latin literature and early Islamic history.

His major publications, for which he has won literary prizes, include the James Tait Black Award, the Duff Cooper Prize, the Heinemann Award and the Runciman Award, include studies of Alexander the Great and Ancient Macedon, Late Antiquity, Christianity and Paganism, the Bible and history, and the Greek Dark Ages. In addition, he is the gardening correspondent of the Financial Times.

== Early life ==
Lane Fox was educated at Eton College, an all-boys public school near Windsor, Berkshire. He studied Literae Humaniores (Classics) at Magdalen College, Oxford. Like his fellow ancient historians Paul Cartledge and Alan Cameron, and philosophers Terence Irwin and John McDowell, he was an undergraduate student of G. E. M. de Ste. Croix.

== Academic career ==
Lane Fox was a fellow of Magdalen College, Oxford, between 1970 and 1973. Between 1974 and 1976, he was a lecturer at Worcester College, Oxford. From 1976 to 1977, he was a research fellow in classical and Islamic history at Worcester. In 1977, he was elected a fellow of New College, Oxford, in succession to G. E. M. de Ste. Croix. In 1990, he was appointed Reader in Ancient History within the Faculty of Classics. In 2012, he retired and was appointed an Emeritus Fellow of New College. Important influences on his contributions to the study of ancient history include Louis Robert, Peter Brown, E. R. Dodds, Timothy Barnes, E. J. Bickerman, Martin Litchfield West, Walter Burkert, and his long-standing New College colleague W. G. (George) Forrest.

His 1973 book Alexander the Great was awarded the Duff Cooper Prize and the James Tait Black Memorial Prize. Due to the success of the book, Lane Fox was historical advisor to the film director Oliver Stone for the epic Alexander. His appearance as an extra in cavalry manoeuvres, in addition to his work as a historical consultant, was publicised at the time of the film's release. He wrote and presented Greek Myths: Tales of Travelling Heroes, which was first broadcast on BBC Four in November 2010.

While primarily focused on ancient Greece, Fox has written three books dealing with the history of Christianity, Pagans and Christians, The Unauthorized Version: Truth and Fiction in the Bible, and a biography of Saint Augustine, Augustine: Conversions and Confessions, which was awarded the Wolfson History Prize. In the second book, Fox professes himself to be a non-believer, although in the last book he expresses much admiration for St Augustine.

He was elected a Fellow of the Royal Society of Literature in 1974.

== Personal life ==
Lane Fox, an atheist, is the father of Martha Lane Fox.

As gardening correspondent of the Financial Times, Lane Fox was involved in a controversy around the banning of garden gnomes and other items of kitsch from the Chelsea Garden Show; Fox made wordplay over the term 'fairy' which can denote a mythical creature or be a slang reference to gay men, saying "there are several very distinguished, great garden designers who are solely male-orientated".

== List of publications ==
- Alexander the Great, Allen Lane, 1973. ISBN 978-0-71390-500-7; US title: The Search for Alexander, Little, Brown & Co., 1980. ISBN 978-0-31629-108-8 (reprinted by the Folio Society with revisions & corrections, 1997)
- Variations on a Garden, Macmillan, 1974. ISBN 978-0-33317-099-1 (reprinted by R. & L., 1986) ISBN 978-0-95113-920-2
- Better Gardening, R. & L., 1982. ISBN 978-0-70991-629-1
- V. Sackville-West. The Illustrated Garden Book: A New Anthology, Michael Joseph, 1986. ISBN 978-0-71812-660-5
- Pagans and Christians, Viking, 1986. ISBN 978-0-67080-848-9 (reprinted by the Folio Society in 3 vols., 2010)
- The Unauthorized Version: Truth and Fiction in the Bible, Viking, 1991. ISBN 978-0-67082-412-0
- The Long March: Xenophon and the Ten Thousand, Yale University Press, 2004. ISBN 978-0-30010-403-5 (editor)
- The Classical World: An Epic History from Homer to Hadrian, Allen Lane, 2005. ISBN 978-0-71399-853-5 (reprinted by the Folio Society)
- Travelling Heroes: Greeks and Their Myths in the Epic Age of Homer, Allen Lane, 2008. ISBN 978-0-71399-980-8
- Thoughtful Gardening: Great Plants, Great Gardens, Great Gardeners, Particular Books, 2010. ISBN 978-1-84614-289-5
- Brill's Companion to Ancient Macedon: Studies in the Archaeology and History of Macedon, 650 BC-300 AD, Brill, 2011. ISBN 978-9-00420-650-2 (editor)
- Augustine: Conversions and Confessions, Allen Lane, 2015. ISBN 978-1-84614-400-4
- The Invention of Medicine: From Homer to Hippocrates, Basic Books, 2020. ISBN 978-0-46509-344-1
- Homer and his Iliad, Allen Lane, 2023. ISBN 978-0-24152-451-0
