= Jane Savage, Marchioness of Winchester =

English aristocrat

Jane Savage
- Marchioness of Winchester
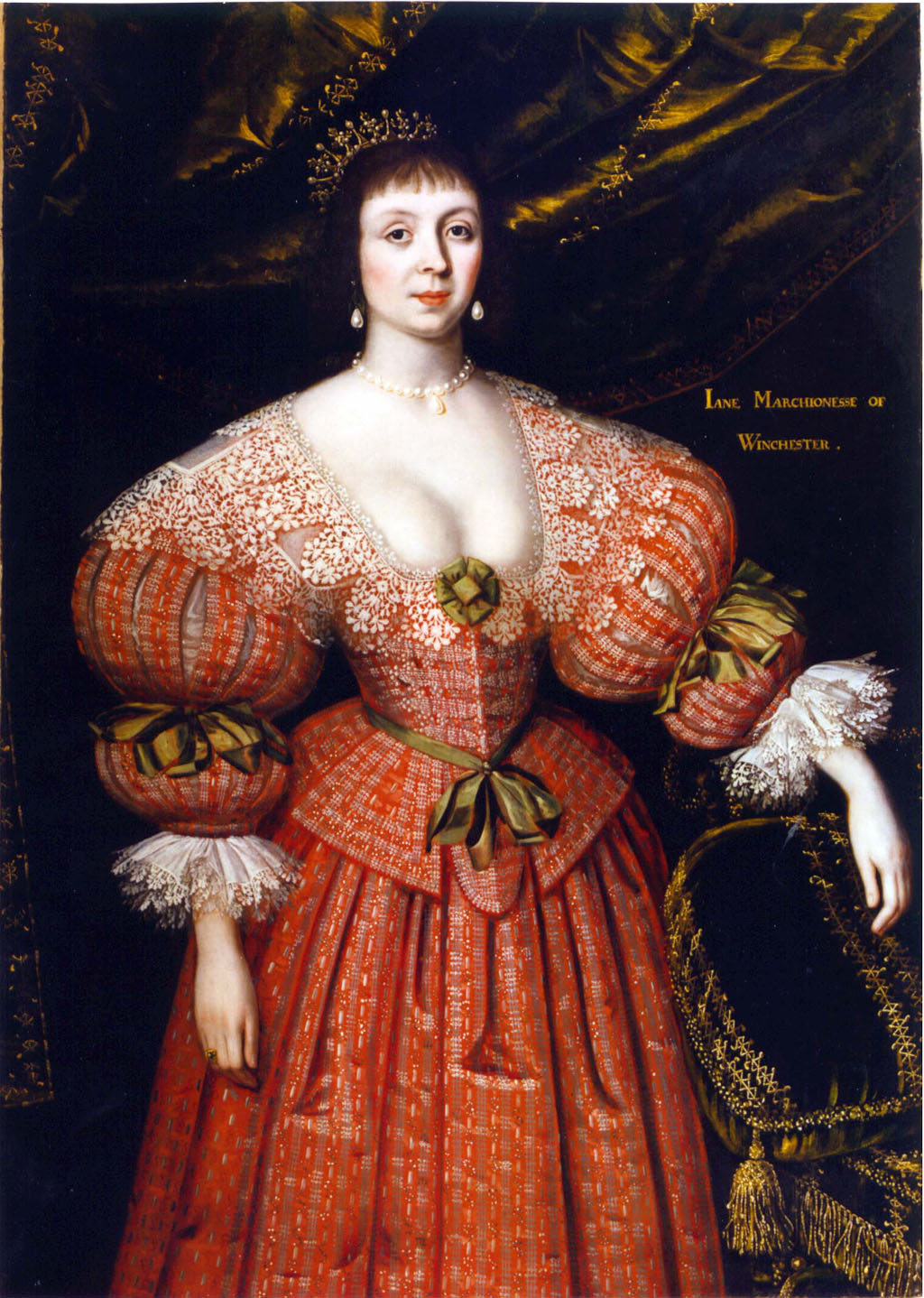
- Jane Marchioness of Winchester, 1632 by Gilbert Jackson
- Other titles: Baroness St John
- Baptised: 26 May 1607; Isleworth
- Died: 15 April 1631 (aged 23); Basing House
- Spouse: John Paulet, 5th Marquess of Winchester (m. 1622)
- Issue: Charles Paulet, 1st Duke of Bolton
- Father: Thomas Savage, 1st Viscount Savage
- Mother: Elizabeth Darcy, Countess Rivers

Jane Paulet née Savage, Marchioness of Winchester (before 26 May 1607 – 15 April 1631) was an English aristocrat, and her death was the subject of several poems.

She was the eldest daughter of Thomas Savage, 1st Viscount Savage of Rocksavage and Elizabeth Darcy, baptised at Isleworth on 26 May 1607.

She married John Paulet, 5th Marquess of Winchester after 18 December 1622 at the age of fifteen. Her surviving child Charles Paulet, 1st Duke of Bolton was born in January 1630.

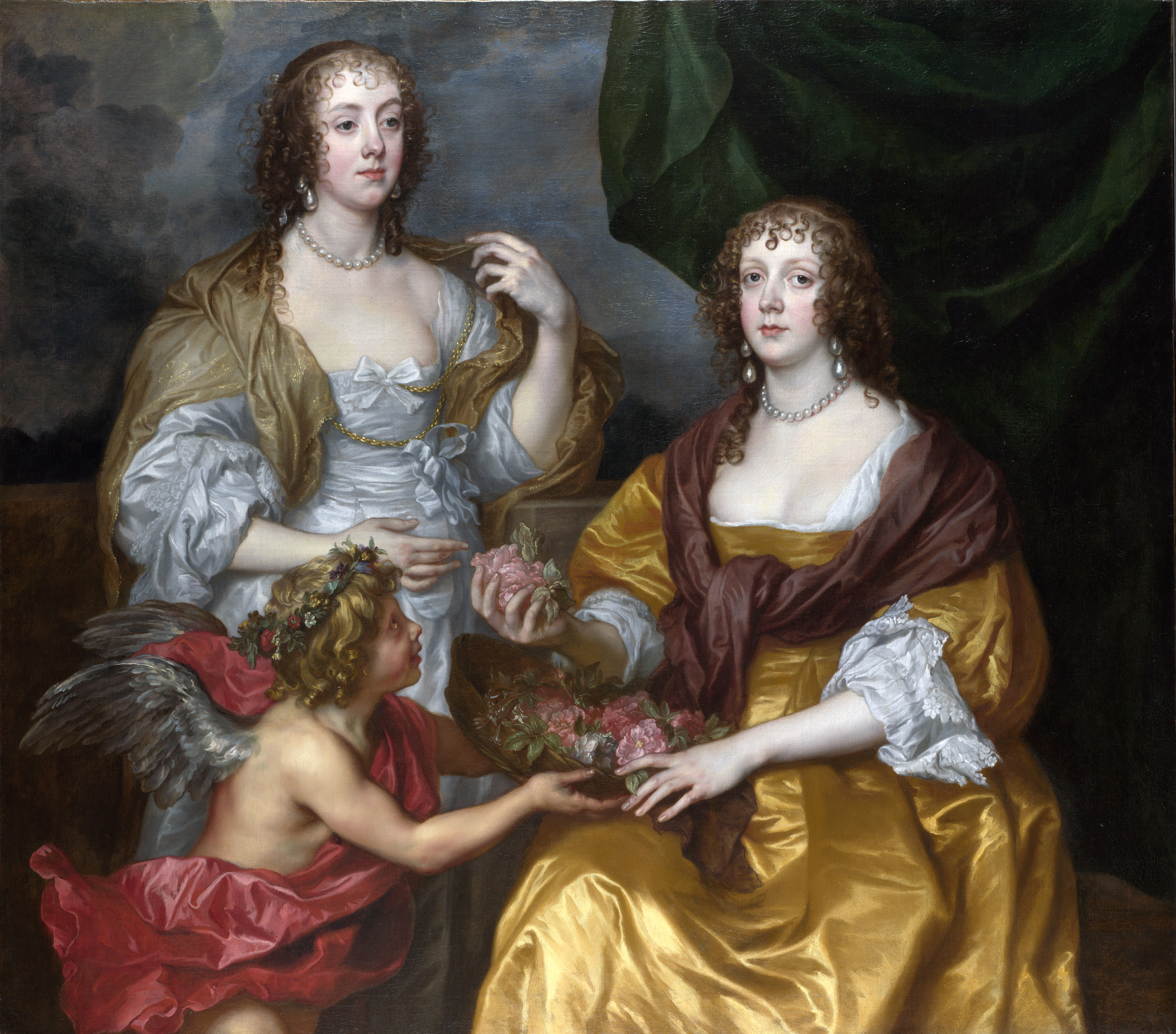
Lady Jane Paulet's sisters came to Basing at Easter to attend the birth of her child

James Howell claimed to have taught her Spanish, and 1626 translated a sonnet for her into Spanish, in the same metre so that it could be sung to the same tune.

She died during childbirth on 15 April 1631 at Basing House. She had an "impostume", an infected swelling of the mouth and cheek which had developed from a toothache, which caused a fever. Her child was stillborn during an intervention for the infection. The circumstances of her death at Easter time in the presence of house guests including her grandfather Lord Rivers and her three sisters were noted in letters written by the Duchess of Buckingham, the Countess of Westmorland, and John Pory.

John Pory included a brief account of her death in a letter to Thomas Puckering, "The Lady Marquess of Winchester, daughter to the Lord Viscount Savage, had an impostume upon her cheek lanced; the humour fell down into her throat, and quickly dispatched her, being big with child, whose death is lamented as well in respect of other her virtues, as that she was inclining to become a protestant".

John Milton, Ben Jonson, Walter Colman, and others wrote epitaphs.

Two portraits of Jane Paulet survive, by Gilbert Jackson, dated 1627 and 1632.
