= John Paulet, 5th Marquess of Winchester =

English nobleman

John Paulet
- Marquess of Winchester; Earl of Wiltshire; Baron St. John
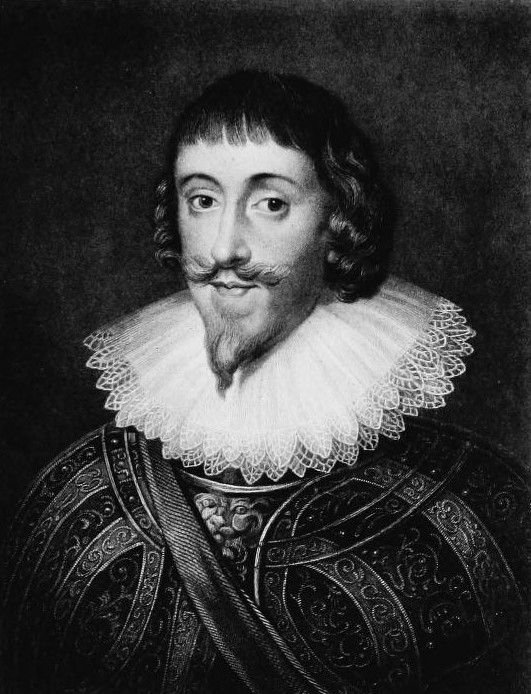
- John Powlett, Marquis of Winchester after Peter Oliver

- Coat of arms
- Born: c. 1598
- Died: 5 March 1675 (aged 76–77)
- Buried: Englefield, Berkshire
- Noble family: Paulet
- Spouses: Jane Savage (m. 1622; died 1631) Honora de Burgh (m. 1633; died 1662) Isabel Howard (m. 1669)
- Issue: with Jane: Charles Paulet, 1st Duke of Bolton; with Honora: John; Francis; Frances; Anne; Honora
- Father: William Paulet, 4th Marquess of Winchester
- Mother: Lucy Cecil

John Paulet, 5th Marquess of Winchester (c. 1598 – 5 March 1675), styled Lord John Paulet until 1621 and Lord St John from 1621 to 1628, was the third but eldest surviving son of William Paulet and his successor as 5th Marquess of Winchester.

== Life ==
He kept terms at Exeter College, Oxford, but as a Roman Catholic could not matriculate. He sat for St Ives from 1620 to 1622. Staying away to recover his family fortune for most of the 1630s, he returned and presented himself to the court and the king in 1639. The fifth Marquess and the Queen became firm friends thereafter, and therefore his chief seat, Basing House, was the great resort of Queen Henrietta Maria's friends in southwest England.

On the outbreak of the English Civil War, he fortified and garrisoned Basing House and held it for Charles I during 1643, 1644 and 1645. The siege of Basing House, notwithstanding an attempt of his younger brother, Lord Charles Paulet, to deliver it up to the enemy, lasted from August 1643 to 16 October 1645, when, during the general decline of the Royal cause, it was taken by storm, after a determined defence, by Oliver Cromwell. The brutality with which the house was sacked was most unusual, as atrocities against civilians during the Civil War were rare and generally discouraged by both sides: the explanation may be the presence of a number of Catholic priests among the defenders. Paulet was subsequently renowned as a great loyalist.

The Marquess was made prisoner with such of his garrison as survived the fight; ten pieces of ordnance and much ammunition were also taken by the victors, as Oliver Cromwell himself, who directed the assault, wrote to the Speaker.

He was committed to the Tower of London on a charge of high treason in 1645, where he remained a long time; an order was made for allowing him 5l. a week out of his property on 15 Jan 1646. Lady Winchester, who had escaped from Basing two days before its fall, was sent to join her husband in the Tower on 31 Jan, and a weekly sum of 10l., afterwards increased to 15l., was ordered to be paid her for the support of herself and her children, with the stipulation that the latter were to be educated as Protestants. An ordinance for the sale of Winchester's land was passed on 30 Oct, and by the act of 16 July 1651, a portion was sold by the trustees for the sale of forfeited estates. On 7 September 1647 Winchester was allowed to drink the waters at Epsom, and stayed there by permission of parliament for nearly six months. The House of Lords on 30 June 1648 urged the commons to release him on bail in consideration of his bad health. In the propositions sent to the king at the Isle of Wight on 13 October, it was expressly stipulated that Winchester's name be excepted from pardon. Ultimately the commons resolved on 14 March 1649 not to proceed against him for high treason, but they ordered him to be detained in prison and excepted from any composition for his estate. In January 1656 he was a prisoner in execution in the upper bench for debts amounting to 2,000l., and he petitioned Cromwell for relief. The sale of his lands was discontinued by order of parliament on 15 March 1660, and after the Restoration Winchester received them back. It was proposed on 3 August 1660 to recompense him for his losses to the amount of 19,000l. and damages, subsequently reduced to 10,000l., and this was agreed to on 2 July 1661. In the event he was allowed to go unrecompensed at the Restoration of the Monarchy, but regained his lands.

== Marriages and issue ==
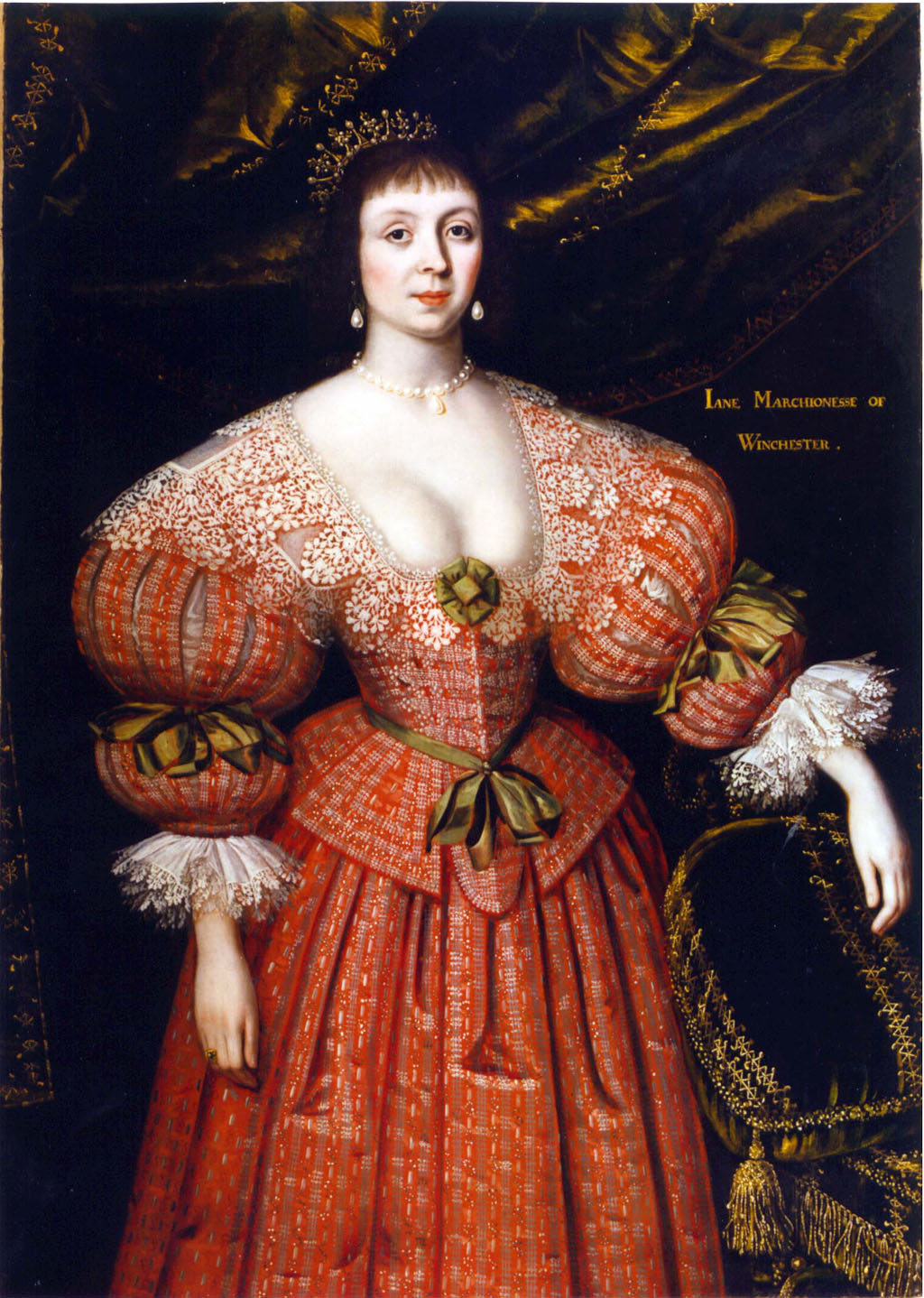
Jane, Marchioness of Winchester, Gilbert Jackson, 1632.

He married as his first wife:

- Jane Savage, daughter of Thomas Savage, 1st Viscount Savage of Rocksavage, after 18 December 1622, and by her had a son:

- Charles Paulet, 1st Duke of Bolton, born c. 1630
Jane died in childbirth in 1631, prompting an epitaph by John Milton

He married as his second wife:

- Honora de Burgh, (d. 10 March 1662), daughter of Richard Burke, 4th Earl of Clanricarde and Frances Walsingham, on 27 August 1633. and by her, had four sons, two of whom survived to maturity, and three daughters:

- John (d. 11 June 1660)
- Francis
- Frances, married Lewis de Ricardie
- Anne (d. 1694), married John Belasyse, 1st Baron Belasyse
- Honora, died unmarried 25 December 1660

He married as his third wife:

- Isabel Howard, daughter of William Howard, 1st Viscount Stafford and Mary Howard, Countess of Stafford, sister of the 5th Baron Stafford, in 1669.

== Death ==
He retired to Englefield House in Berkshire, which was a wedding gift from his second marriage to Lady Honora de Burgh in the early 1630s. He died on 5 March 1674 and was buried at Englefield, Berkshire. Paulet was succeeded, by his eldest son, Charles Paulet, as 6th Marquess of Winchester, later created 1st Duke of Bolton. Charles converted to the Church of England, a great blow to the Roman Catholic community of Hampshire, who had for many years looked to the Paulet family to shield them from the worst rigours of the Penal Laws.

== Footnotes ==
Attribution

== Sources ==
- Childs, Jessie (2022). The Siege of Loyalty House: A Civil War Story. London: The Bodley Head. ISBN 9781847923721.
- Cokayne, G. E. (1898). Complete Peerage of England, Scotland, Ireland, Great Britain, and the United Kingdom: Extant, Extinct, or Dormant. Vol. VIII. Exeter: William Pollard.
- Cokayne, G. E. (1912). Gibbs, Vicary (ed.). The Complete Peerage of England, Scotland, Ireland, Great Britain, and the United Kingdom: Extant, Extinct, or Dormant. Vol. II. London: St Catherine Press. p. 210.
- Collins, Arthur; Brydges, Egerton (1812). Collins's Peerage of England: Genealogical, Biographical, and Historical; Greatly Augmented and Continued to the Present Time by Sir Egerton Bridges, K. J. Vol. 2. London: F. C. and J. Rivington. OCLC 1191000886.
- Helms, M. W.; Watson, Paula (1983). "Powlett, (Paulet), Charles I, Lord St. John of Basing (c.1630–99), of Lincoln's Inn Fields, London and Hackwood, Hants.". In Henning, B. D. (ed.). The History of Parliament: the House of Commons 1660–1690. Histparl.ac.uk – via The History of Parliament Online.
- Hunneyball, Paul (2010). "Paulet, Lord John (c.1598-1675), of Hackwood House, Basing, Hants; Later of Englefield House, Englefield, Berks.". In Thrush, Andrew; Ferris, John P. (eds.). The History of Parliament: the House of Commons 1604-1629 – via The History of Parliament Online.
- Lodge, Edmund (1859). The Genealogy of the Existing British Peerage and Baronetage: Containing the Family Histories of the Nobility. London: Hurst and Blackett. p. 580.
- "Milton: An Epitaph on the Marchioness of Winchester". Dartmouth.edu. Archived from the original on 11 February 2021.

Peerage of England
Preceded by William Paulet	Marquess of Winchester; 1628–1674	Succeeded by Charles Paulet
Preceded by William Paulet	Baron St John of Basing (writ in acceleration); 1624–1674	Succeeded by Charles Paulet
