= Charles Paulet, 1st Duke of Bolton =

English politician (1630–1699)

His Grace The Duke of Bolton PC JP
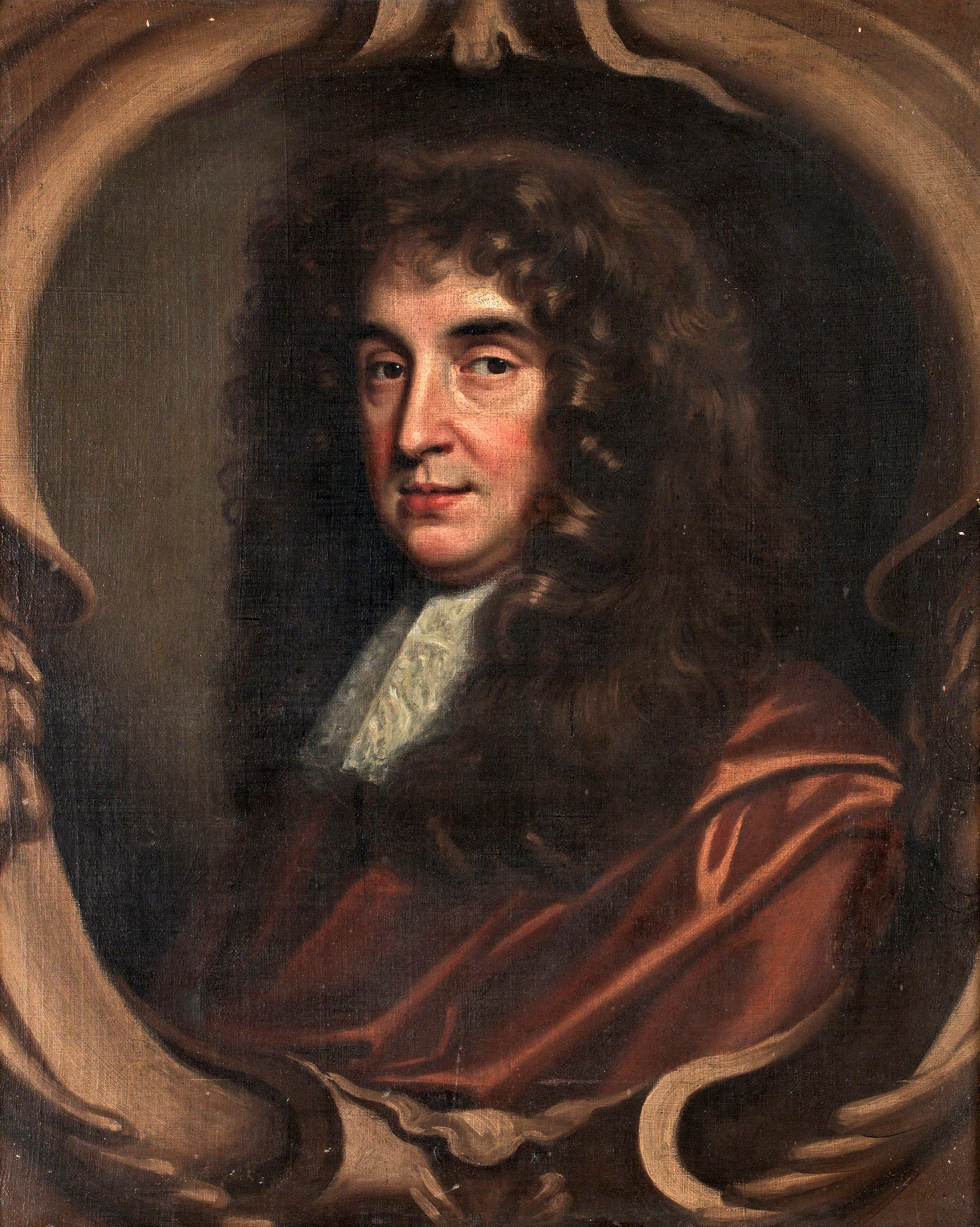

Custos Rotulorum of Hampshire
- In office 1670–1676
- Monarch: Charles II
- Preceded by: The Earl of Northumberland
- Succeeded by: The Lord Annesley

Lord Lieutenant of Hampshire
- In office 20 December 1667 – 1675
- Monarch: Charles II
- Preceded by: The Earl of Southampton
- Succeeded by: The Earl of Gainsborough
- In office 4 April 1689 – 27 February 1699
- Monarchs: William III and Mary II (until 1694)
- Preceded by: The Duke of Berwick
- Succeeded by: The 2nd Duke of Bolton

Member of Parliament for Winchester
- In office 1660–1660 Serving with John Hooke
- Preceded by: Thomas Cole
- Succeeded by: Lawrence Hyde

Member of Parliament for Hampshire
- In office 1661–1675 Serving with Sir John Norton
- Preceded by: Richard Norton
- Succeeded by: Sir Francis Rolle

Personal details
- Born: Charles Paulet c. 1630
- Died: 27 February 1699 (aged 68–69) Amport, Hampshire
- Resting place: St Mary's Church, Basing, Hampshire; 51°16′17″N 1°02′48″W
- Spouses: Christian Frescheville (m. 1652; died 1653) Mary le Scrope (m. 1655; died 1680)
- Children: with Mary: Jane Paulet; Mary Paulet; Charles Paulet, 2nd Duke of Bolton; William Paulet
- Parents: John Paulet, 5th Marquess of Winchester; Jane Savage

Charles Paulet, 1st Duke of Bolton PC JP (c. 1630 – 27 February 1699) was an English politician who represented Winchester and Hampshire in the House of Commons of England from 1660 to 1675. He was the son of John Paulet, 5th Marquess of Winchester, and his first wife, Jane Savage.

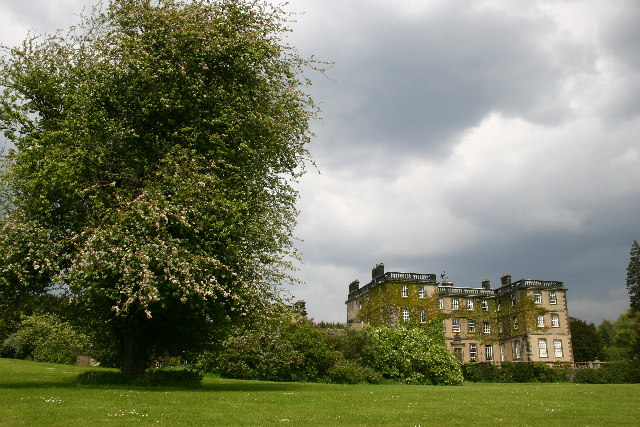
Bolton Hall, North Yorkshire, as rebuilt after a fire in 1902

== Career ==
Paulet succeeded his father as the sixth Marquess of Winchester in 1675. He was MP for Winchester in 1660 and then for Hampshire from 1661 to 5 March 1675. Before his succession to the Marquessate he was styled Lord St John.

He held the following offices:

- Freeman, Winchester June 1660, Hartlepool 1670
- Justice of the Peace Hampshire July 1660–?d., Yorkshire (North Riding) 1664–?85, Surrey, Middlesex and Westminster 1671–?80, (East Riding) by 1680–85
- Commissioner for assessment, Hampshire August 1660–75, N. Riding 1663–75, West and East Ridings and County Durham 1673–5
- Commissioner for loyal and indigent officers, Hampshire 1662
- Lord Lieutenant Hampshire 1667–76, 1689–1699;
- Warden of the New Forest 1668–76, 1689–1699
- High Steward, Winchester 1669–84
- Custos rotulorum Hampshire 1670–6, 1689–1699
- Keeper of King's Lodge, Petersham 1671–?76
- Commissioner for recusants, Hampshire 1675
- Colonel of a Regiment of Hampshire Militia Foot and Troop of Horse by 1697–1699
- Privy Councillor 22 April 1679 – 1699
- Colonel of foot 1689–98

Having supported the claim of William and Mary to the English throne in 1688, he was restored to the Privy Council and to the office of Lord Lieutenant of Hampshire, and was created Duke of Bolton on 9 April 1689. He built Bolton Hall, North Yorkshire in 1678.

== Character ==
An eccentric man, hostile to Lord Halifax and afterwards to the Duke of Marlborough, he is said to have travelled during 1687 with four coaches and 100 horsemen, sleeping during the day and giving entertainments at night. His adherence in adult life to the Church of England has been described as a great blow to the Roman Catholic community; his father (with whom his relationship was never good) had openly professed the Catholic faith, and used his wealth and influence to protect the Catholics of Hampshire.

In 1666 he briefly went into hiding after becoming involved in a public fracas in Westminster Hall with Sir Andrew Henley, 1st Baronet. They fought in full view of the Court of Common Pleas, and were thus guilty of contempt coram rege. In time, both men received a royal pardon. Paulet, who admitted to striking the first blow, explained that he had been "in a passion" at the time. The precise cause of the quarrel is unknown. Samuel Pepys, who recorded the incident in the great Diary, remarked that it was a pity that Henley retaliated, for otherwise, the judges might have dealt with Paulet, of whom Pepys had a poor opinion, as he deserved. Despite his faults, his charm and affability made him numerous friends.

== Marriage and issue ==
Charles Paulet married twice:

=== First marriage ===
He married as his first wife, 28 February 1652, Christian (13 December 1633 – 22 May 1653), daughter of John Frescheville, 1st Baron Frescheville of Staveley, Derbyshire and Sarah Harrington, and by her had a son:

- Unknown Paulet, born May 1653, died May 1653

Christian, Lady St John, died on 22 May 1653 in childbirth and was buried with her infant at Staveley, Derbyshire.

=== Second marriage ===
He married as his second wife, 12 February 1655, at St Dionis Backchurch, London, Mary (died 1 November 1680), the illegitimate daughter of Emanuel Scrope, 1st Earl of Sunderland, widow of Henry Carey, Lord Leppington, and by her had issue:

- Jane Paulet, c.1656–23 May 1716, married 2 April 1673 John Egerton, 3rd Earl of Bridgwater
- Mary Paulet, who married Tobias Jenkins
- Charles Paulet, 2nd Duke of Bolton, 1661–1722
- William Paulet, c.1666-1729

Mary, Lady Paulet died 1 Nov 1680, at Moulins, Allier, France, and was buried, 12 Nov 1680, at Wensley, Yorkshire.

== Death ==
Charles Paulet died suddenly at Amport on 27 February 1699, aged 68, and was buried on 23 March at Basing, Hampshire.

== Sources ==
- "Bolton Hall, Preston-under-Scar". Britishlistedbuildings.co.uk.
- "Charles Powlett, Duke of Bolton". Family Search: Community Trees. British Isles. Peerage, Baronetage, and Landed Gentry families with extended lineage. Histfam.familysearch.org. Archived from the original on 20 December 2013.
- Cokayne, George Edward (1912). Gibbs, Vicary (ed.). "The complete peerage of England, Scotland, Ireland, Great Britain, and the United Kingdom : extant, extinct, or dormant". London: St Catherine Press. p. 210.
- Helms, M. W. and Watson, Paula (1983). Henning, B. D. (ed.). "POWLETT, (PAULET), Charles I, Lord St. John of Basing (c.1630-99), of Lincoln's Inn Fields, London and Hackwood, Hants". The History of Parliament: the House of Commons 1660-1690. Histparl.ac.uk.

Parliament of England
Preceded by John Hooke; Thomas Cole	Member of Parliament for Winchester; 1660–1661; With: John Hooke	Succeeded by Richard Goddard; Lawrence Hyde
Preceded by Richard Norton; John Bulkeley	Member of Parliament for Hampshire; 1661–1675; With: Sir John Norton	Succeeded by Sir Francis Rolle; Sir John Norton
Military offices
Regiment raised	Colonel of The Duke of Bolton's Regiment of Foot; 1689–1697	Regiment disbanded
Regiment raised	Colonel of Henry Holt's Regiment of Foot; 1689–1697	Regiment disbanded
Honorary titles
Preceded by The Earl of Southampton	Lord Lieutenant of Hampshire; 1667–1675	Succeeded by Edward Noel
Preceded by The Earl of Northumberland	Custos Rotulorum of Hampshire; 1670–1676	Succeeded by Lord Annesley
Preceded by The Duke of Berwick	Lord Lieutenant of Hampshire; 1689–1699	Succeeded by The Duke of Bolton
Peerage of England
New title	Duke of Bolton; 1689–1699	Succeeded by Charles Paulet
Preceded by John Paulet	Marquess of Winchester; 1675–1699	Succeeded by Charles Paulet
