= Thomas Savage, 1st Viscount Savage =

English peer and courtier

The Right Honourable The Viscount Savage Bt Kt
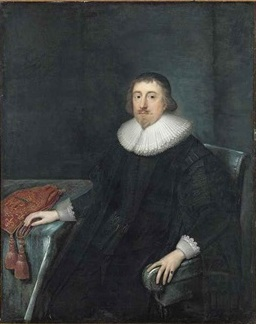
- Thomas Savage, 1st Viscount Savage (1586-1635), by Cornelius Johnson (1593-1661)

- Coat of arms
- Born: Thomas Savage c. 1586; Rocksavage, Cheshire
- Died: 20 November 1635 (aged 48–49); Tower Hill, London
- Buried: St Michael and All Angels' Church, Macclesfield; 53.2603°N 2.1244°W
- Residence: Melford Hall
- Noble family: Savage family
- Spouse: Elizabeth Darcy (m. 1602)
- Issue: John Savage, 2nd Earl Rivers; Thomas Savage; Francis Savage; William Savage; James Savage; Charles Savage; Jane Savage; Dorothy Savage; Elizabeth Savage; Anne Savage; Catherine Savage; Henrietta Maria
- Father: Sir John Savage
- Mother: Mary Allington
- Occupation: Courtier

Thomas Savage, 1st Viscount Savage, 2nd Baronet (c. 1586 – 20 November 1635), was an English peer and courtier in the reign of Charles I.

== Early life ==
Savage was the eldest son of Sir John Savage (1554 – 1615), 1st Baronet, of Rocksavage in Cheshire and Mary (d. 1635), daughter of Richard Allington. He succeeded his father as 2nd Baronet 7 July 1615.

== Career ==
In 1616 Savage served as Deputy Lieutenant of Cheshire and was knighted 29 June 1617, in Edinburgh. He was made Steward of the borough of Congleton in January 1625; First Commissioner of Trade in 1626; Commissioner to advise as to ways and means of increasing the King's revenue in July 1626, and for the sale of the King's lands, 15 September in the same year. On 4 November 1626 he was created Viscount Savage. He was appointed Chancellor to the Queen Consort in 1628 and her Councillor in 1634. He was also Ranger of Delamere Forest in Cheshire.

== Marriage and issue ==
He married Elizabeth, daughter of Thomas Darcy, 1st Earl Rivers and Mary Kitson, on 14 May 1602. The couple had eleven sons and eight daughters:

- John Savage, 2nd Earl Rivers (1603 – 1654), married firstly, Catherine, daughter of William Parker, 13th Baron Morley and secondly, Mary, daughter of Thomas Ogle.
- Thomas Savage, married Bridget, widow of Sir Edward Somerset, son of Edward Somerset, 4th Earl of Worcester, daughter of William Whitmore by Margaret Beeston, and great-great-granddaughter of Thomas Cromwell, 1st earl of Essex.
- Francis Savage (bef. 1609 – )
- William Savage (1619 – )
- James Savage (1609 – 1638)
- Richard Savage, baptised in 1622.
- Charles Savage (c. 1622– ), married and had a daughter:

- Mary Savage, married Jeremy Thoresby, son of John Thoresby of Leeds and younger brother of the antiquarian, Ralph Thoresby.

- Jane Savage (1607 – 15 April 1631), married after 18 December 1622, as his first wife, John Paulet, 5th Marquess of Winchester.
- Dorothy Savage (c. 1611 – 6 December 1691), married 10 April 1637, Charles Howard, 2nd Earl of Berkshire.
- Elizabeth Savage (c. 1612– ), married Sir John Thimbleby (1603 – 1661), of Irnham, Lincolnshire.
- Anne Savage (1617 – 16 June 1696), married in 1661, as his second wife, Robert Brudenell, 2nd Earl of Cardigan.
- Catherine Savage, a nun at Dunkirk.
- Henrietta Maria Savage (c. 1621 – 1663), married, in 1645, Ralph Sheldon, of Beoley, Worcestershire.
Arms of Savage: Argent, six lions rampant, sable

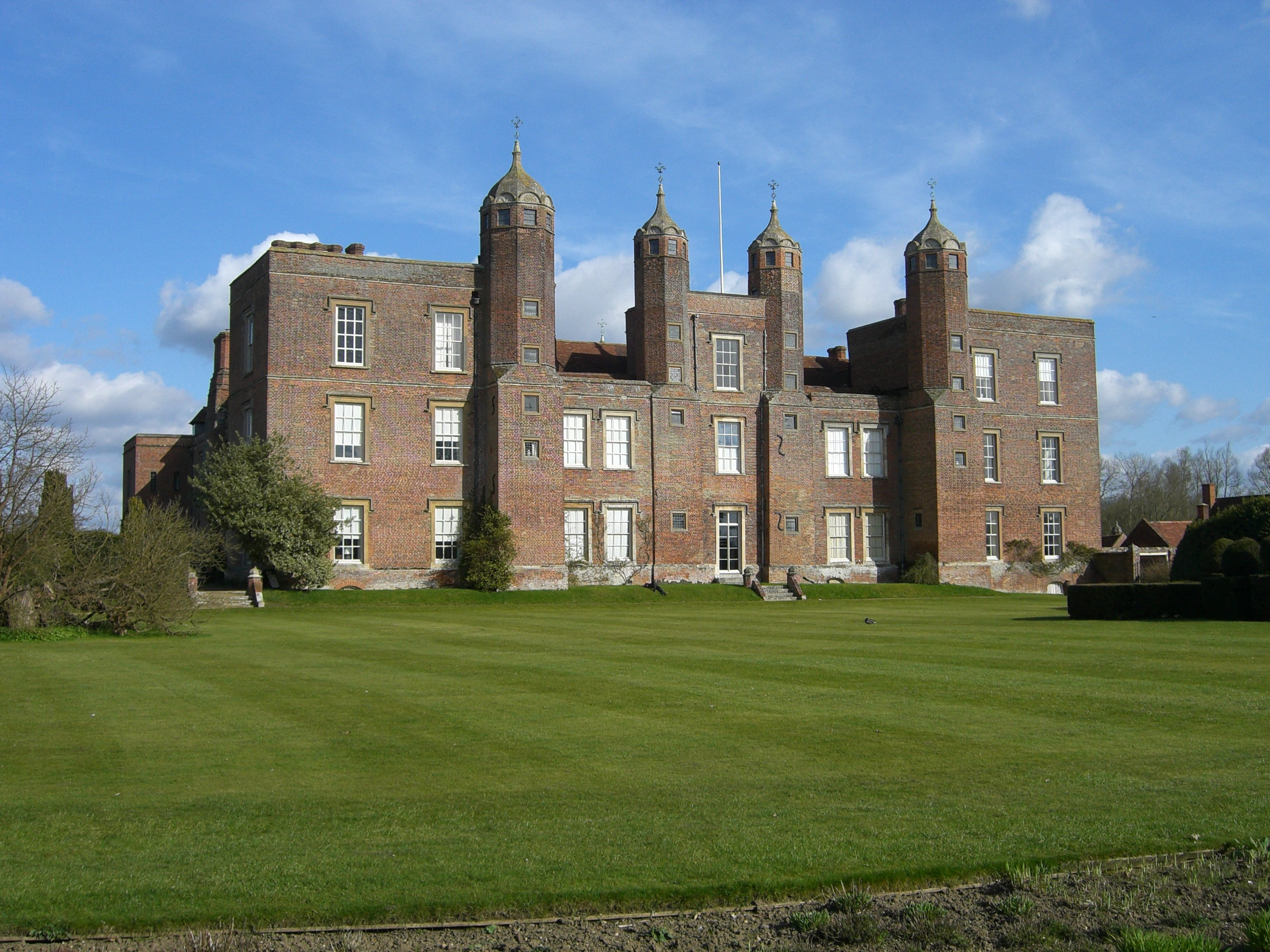
Melford Hall, Suffolk

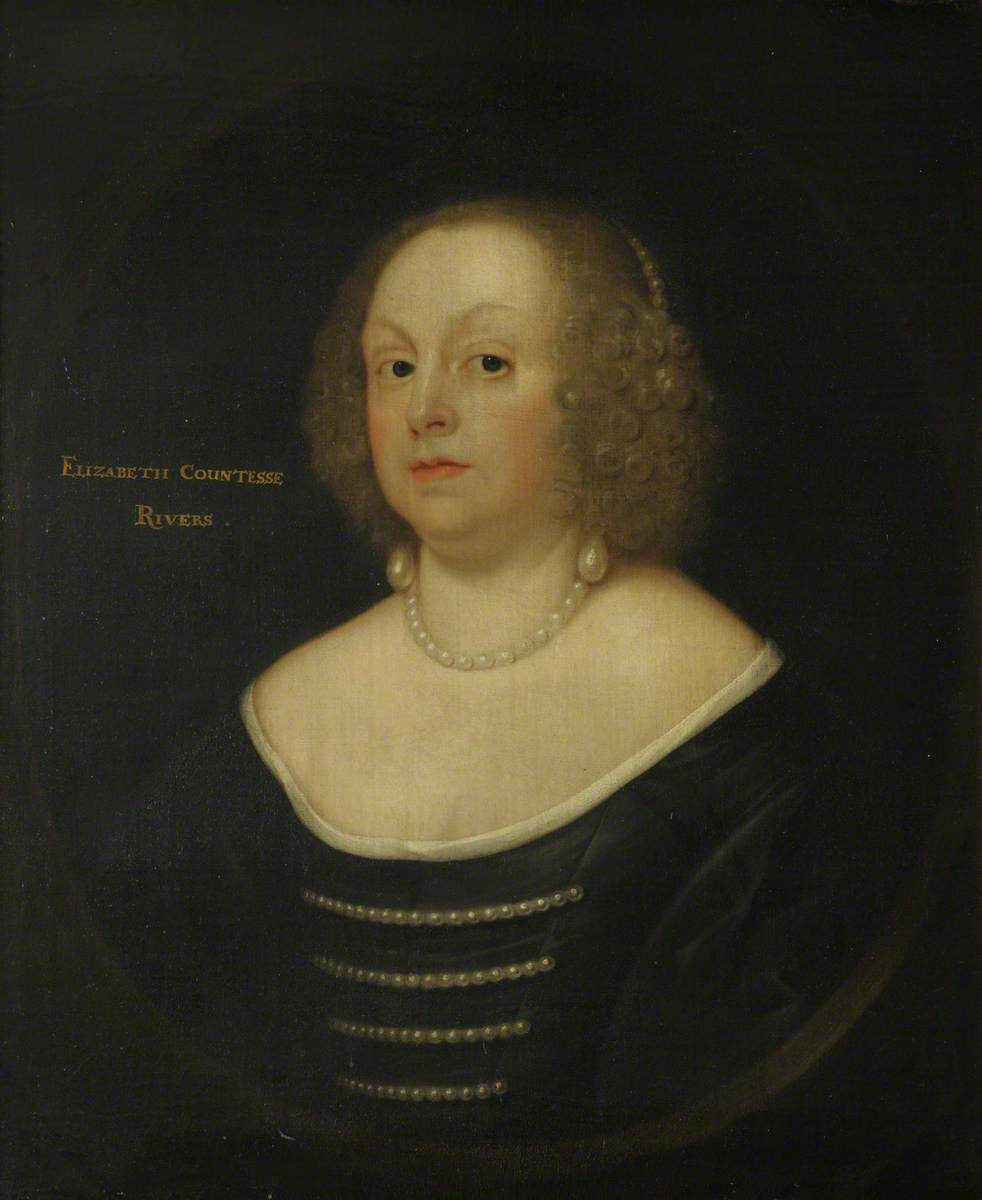
Lady Elizabeth Darcy, Countess Rivers and Viscountess Savage

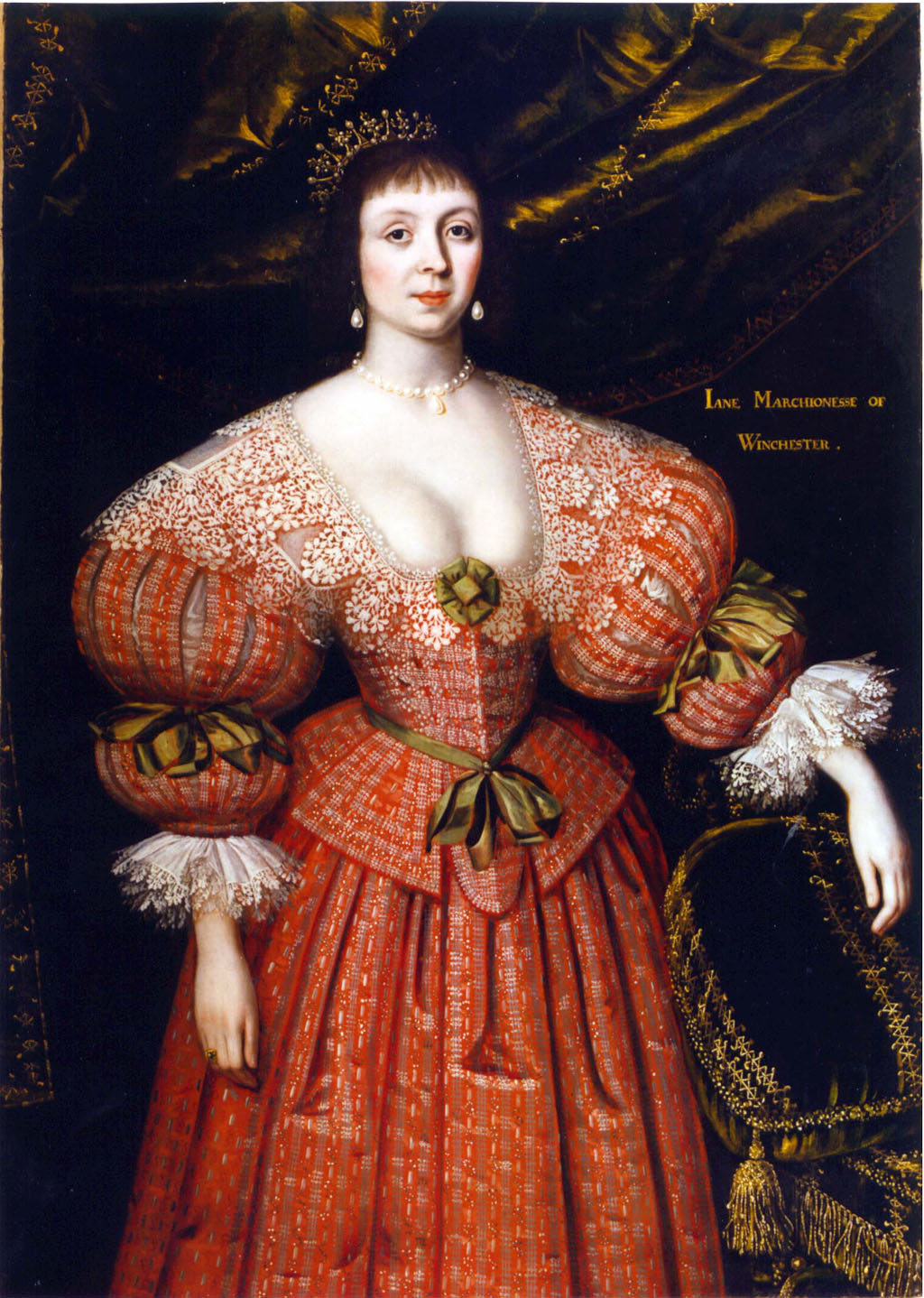
Jane, Marchioness of Winchester, Gilbert Jackson

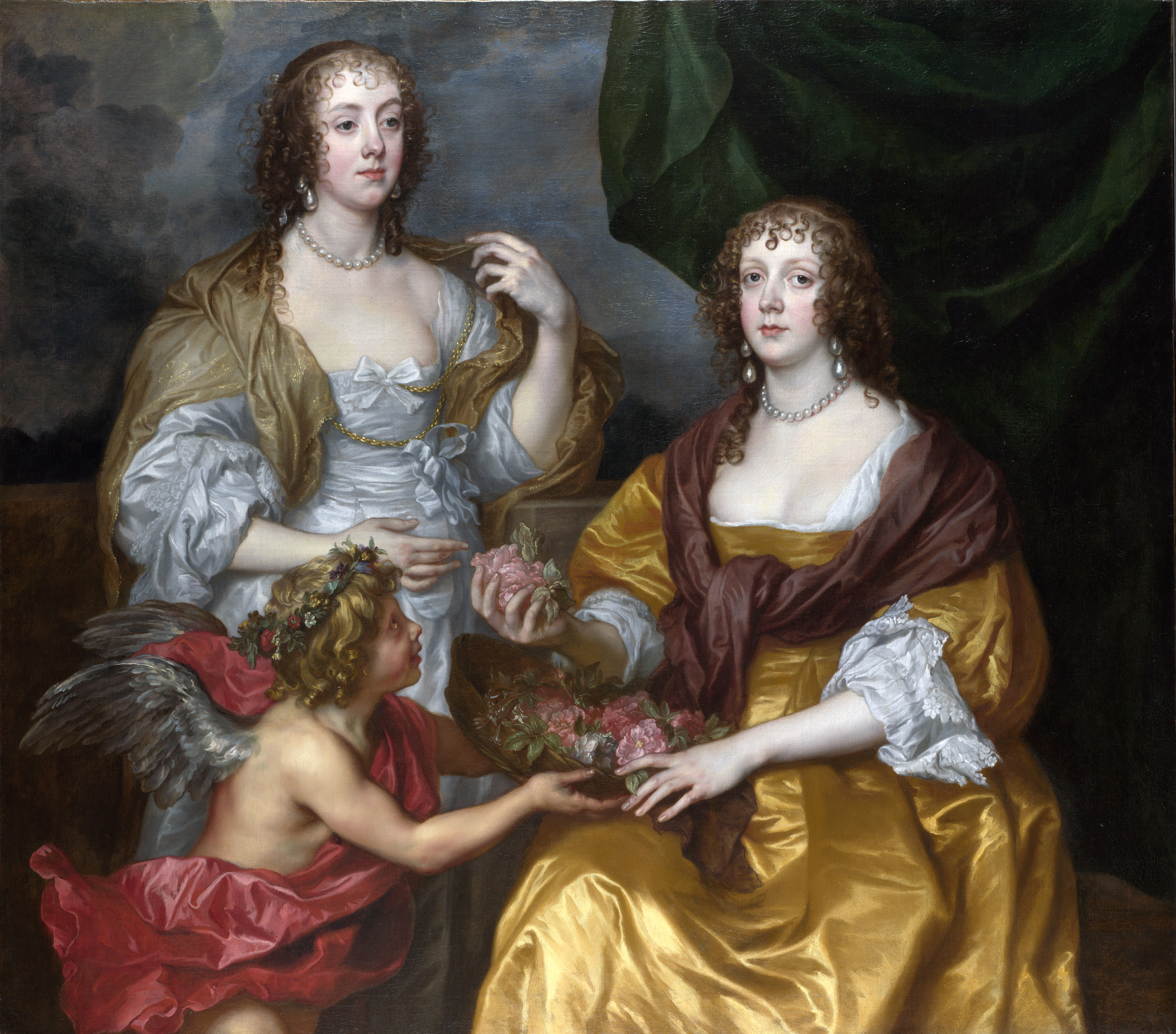
Lady Elizabeth Thimbelby and her Sister, Anthony van Dyck

== Death and succession ==
By special remainder, Savage was made heir to his father-in-law's titles, but did not live to inherit them. He died 20 November of "the running gout" at his home on Tower Hill in London and was buried 16 December 1635 in the Savage family chapel in Macclesfield, Cheshire. He was buried on the same day as his mother; only ten of his nineteen children were still living at the time of his death. His eldest son, John, succeeded him as 2nd Viscount Savage, later becoming 2nd Earl Rivers on the death of his maternal grandfather in 1640. His widow was created, on 21 April 1641, Countess Rivers for life, fourteen months after her father's death. She died 9 March 1651 and was buried at St. Osyth's, Essex.

== Notes ==
Peerage of England
New creation	Viscount Savage; 1626–1635	Succeeded by John Savage
Baronetage of England
Preceded by John Savage	Baronet (of Rocksavage); 1615–1635	Succeeded by John Savage
