= Basing House =

Ruined Tudor house & palace in Hampshire, England

Coordinates: 51.26872°N 1.05248°W

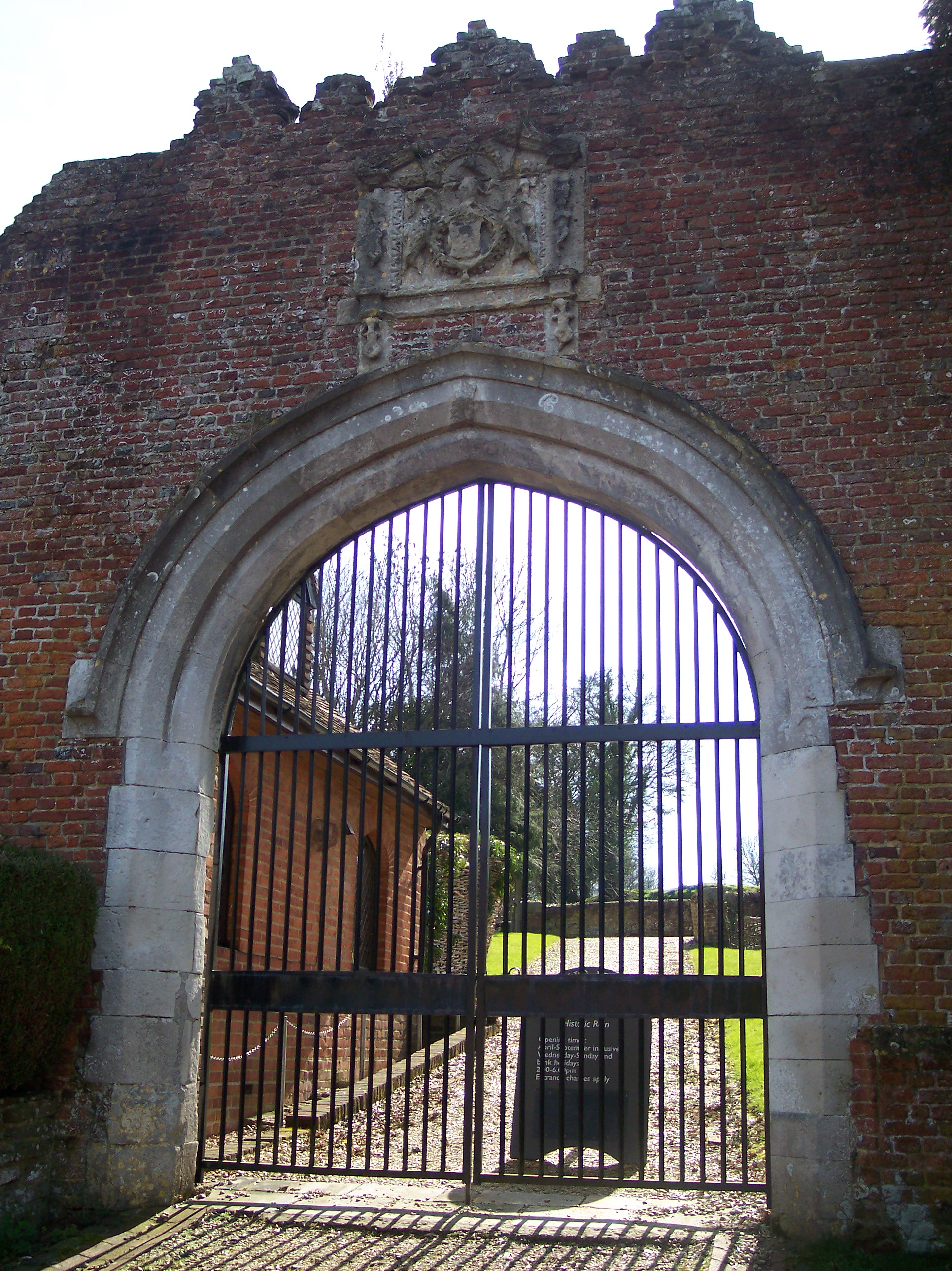
Entrance gate to the Basing House ruins, Old Basing.

Basing House was a Tudor palace and castle in the village of Old Basing in the English county of Hampshire. It once rivalled Hampton Court Palace in its size and opulence. Today only parts of the basement or lower ground floor, plus the foundations and earthworks, remain. The ruins are a Grade II listed building and a scheduled monument.

== History ==
Basing House was built from 1531 as a new palace for William Paulet, 1st Marquess of Winchester, treasurer to King Edward VI, Queen Mary I, and Queen Elizabeth I. The nearby 'Great Barn' was completed in 1534, just before a visit from Henry VIII and Anne Boleyn.

In its final form, Basing House comprised two linked houses. The "Old House" replaced the keep of an older ringwork castle, so was located within a defensive ring of earthworks and walls, whilst the slightly later "New House" was located outside the defences. A bridge and gateway linked the two across and through the defences, a link that was to prove fatal in the final battle for the fortress. The "New House" 'annex' in itself had approximately 360 rooms and was built primarily to accommodate the multitude of people that accompanied royalty when they visited.

Edward VI visited on 7 September 1552 and went on to Donnington Castle after three days. Elizabeth I came in August 1560 and so liked the house and entertainment that she said she would have married Lord Treasurer Paulet if he had been a younger man. She returned in August 1569. In September 1601 she entertained the French ambassador, the Duke de Biron, at the expense of the Marquess of Winchester. She hunted in the park with visiting French noblemen and killed 20 deer, and knighted 11 men. King James visited in August 1603. Anne of Denmark stayed in September 1603. There was dancing, and the elderly Earl of Nottingham was betrothed to the much younger Margaret Stewart.

On taking the title in February 1629, the 5th Marquess downsized, moved the family out and waited until returns from his extensive estates all over England allowed him to start restorations. For the first half of the 1630s, the house was closed and the windows boarded over after the family relocated to its other houses. The 4th Marquess's entertainments almost bankrupted the family, maintenance of the house fell behind, and the design of such a large brick-built (and somewhat experimental) complex after one hundred years had its problems with dry and wet rot, broken windows, leaking roofs, and keeping the various wings heated.

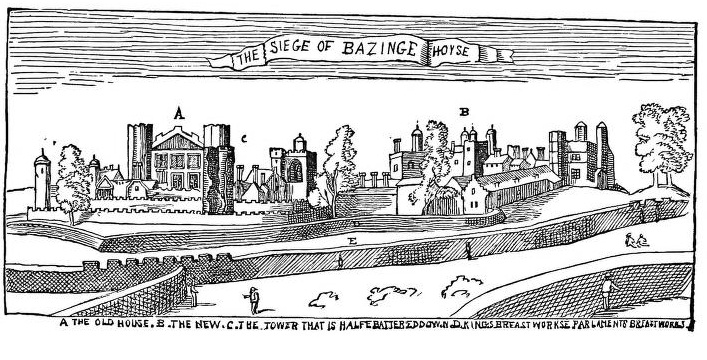
The siege of Basing House.

At the time of the outbreak of the English Civil War in 1642, the 5th Marquess. John Paulet, was a supporter of King Charles I. As a consequence, parliamentary forces invested Basing House on three occasions, with the Royalists breaking the first two sieges.

The final siege started in August 1645 when Colonel John Dalbier, with 800 troops, took up position around the walls. The garrison held out, despite further reinforcements to the attacking force, until Oliver Cromwell arrived with a heavy siege-train. By 14 October 1645, the New House had been taken and the defences of the Old House breached. The final storming took place across the link from the New House. Many valuable goods were carried off, and a fire destroyed the building, as well as killing several priests who had taken refuge in the cellar. From the first firing of the guns, the assault was over in forty-five minutes, with the fires raging for up to nine hours after the event.

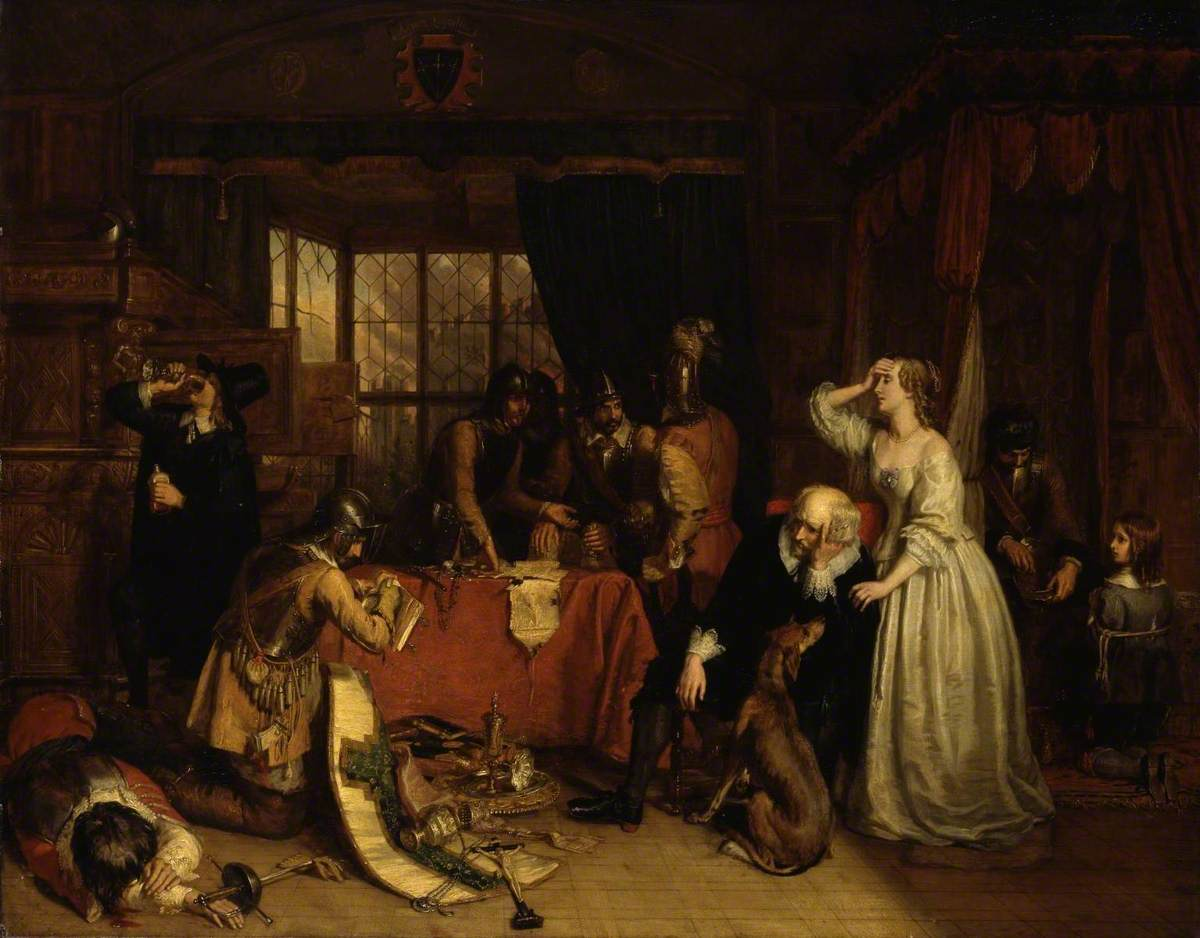
An 1836 painting by Charles Landseer depicting Parliamentarian troops plundering Basing House after capturing it

To send a message to other Royalist supporters, Cromwell returned to London and there was a Parliamentary decree issued that anyone could take from the estate, and therefore local villagers were encouraged to remove bricks from Basing House, and these materials were reused in homes in the surrounding area. While the local populace would sometimes be used to dismantle buildings, it was unusual to encourage them to make use of the materials. There is archaeological evidence that the materials of the house were arranged into types for systematic reclaim, rather than a 'free-for-all'.

John Paulet had his estates confiscated and was sent to the Tower of London on a charge of high treason, which was later dropped, and the site of Basing House was returned to him by Charles II. His son Charles Paulet, 1st Duke of Bolton, became wealthy again as a consequence of his support for William of Orange during the Glorious Revolution. This wealth was used to demolish what was left of Basing House and to build nearby a new house at Hackwood that became the new seat of the Marquesses of Winchester (later titled also Dukes of Bolton) until 1794. The prior history of the area on which this house stands is unclear.

== Location ==
Basing House is located in the village of Old Basing, approximately one mile east of the centre of the town of Basingstoke, in the north of the English county of Hampshire. The house is situated close to the upper reaches of the River Loddon. Operated and funded by Hampshire Cultural Trust since 2014, the extensive ruins and gardens are open to the public. Parts of the basement or lower ground floor remain, including the wine cellar, brick doorways and archways, bread ovens, salt alcoves, side rooms with surviving vaulted roofs, a vaulted tunnel, and even some original plaster and mortar. Access is by a riverside walk from a car park several hundred yards away. A UK Heritage Lottery Fund scheme has supported significant upgrades and renovations in recent years. The former Basingstoke Canal (1788-1910) ran around Basing House and through other parts of Old Basing.

The ruins are set in extensive 14-acre grounds, enjoyed by visitors for picnics and walks with their dogs.
