= Elizabeth Savage, Countess Rivers =

English courtier

Elizabeth Savage
- Countess Rivers
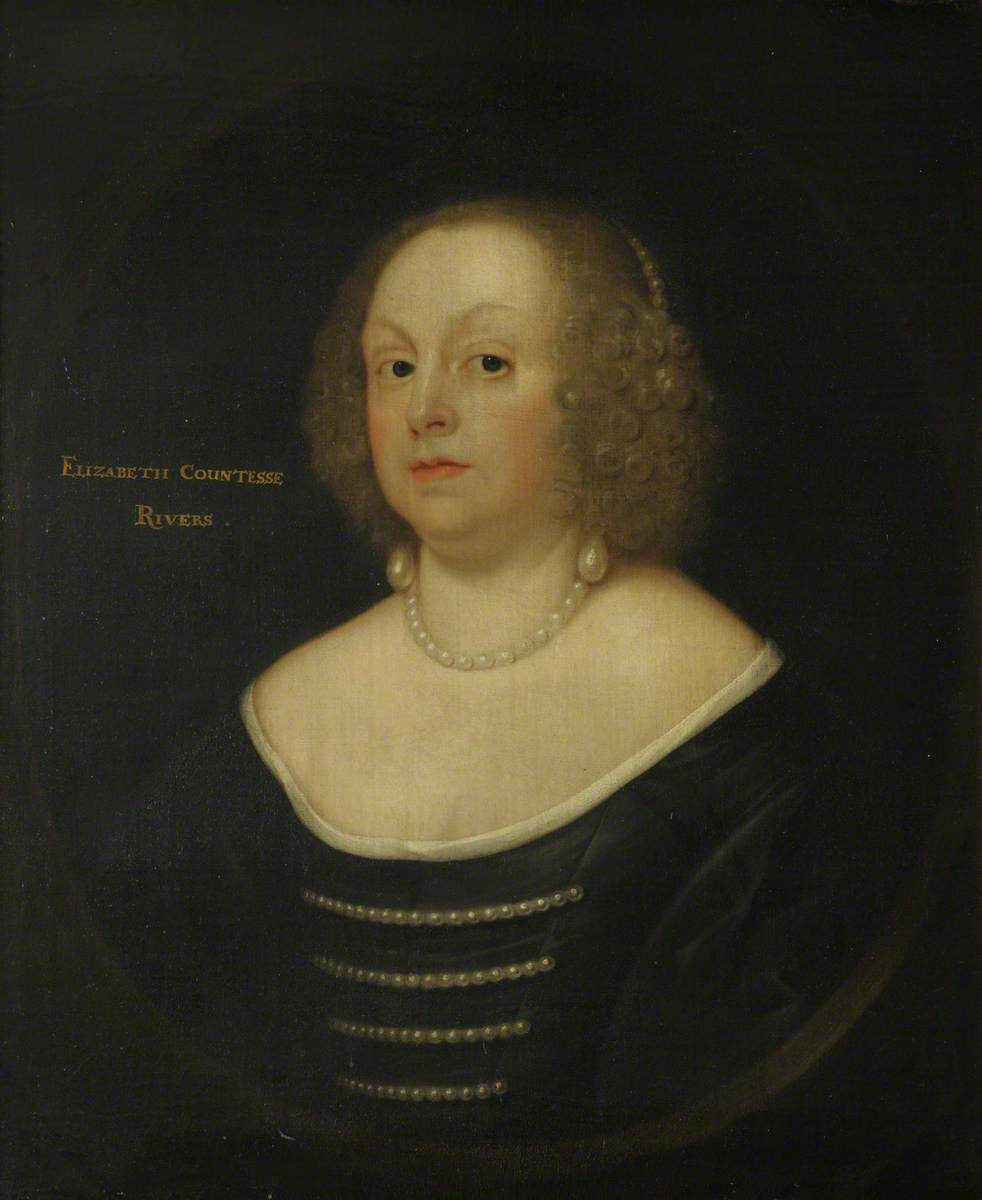
- Lady Elizabeth Darcy, Countess Rivers and Viscountess Savage
- Reign: Charles I
- Other titles: Viscountess Savage
- Born: Elizabeth Darcy; 1581
- Died: 9 March 1651 (aged 69–70)
- Buried: St Osyth, St Peter and St Paul church, Essex; 51.79863°N 1.07724°E
- Spouse: Thomas Savage, 1st Viscount Savage (m. 1602; died 1635)
- Issue: John Savage, 2nd Earl Rivers, Jane Savage and others ...
- Father: Thomas Darcy, 1st Earl Rivers
- Mother: Mary Kitson
- Occupation: courtier

Elizabeth Savage, Countess Rivers and Viscountess Savage (née Darcy; 1581 – 9 March 1651) was an English courtier and a Royalist victim of uprisings during the English Civil War.

== Early life ==
Born Hon. Elizabeth Darcy, she was the daughter of Thomas Darcy, 1st Earl Rivers and Mary Kitson (died 1644), a granddaughter of Thomas Kitson.

== Marriage ==
On 14 May 1602, Elizabeth married Thomas Savage with whom she had had eleven sons and eight daughters. He was the eldest son of Sir John Savage, 1st Baronet and his wife Mary née Allington, from whom he inherited Melford Hall in Suffolk. In 1615, he inherited his father's baronetcy and was created Viscount Savage in 1626. On his death in 1635, Elizabeth (by now Viscountess Savage) inherited Melford. This and St Osyth Priory in Essex formed her principal residences.

On the death of Lady Savage's father in 1640, the earldom of Rivers passed to her eldest son, John. As compensation for not enjoying the rank of a countess, she was created Countess Rivers for life in 1641.

== Allegiances ==
As well as inheriting property and being raised in rank following the death of her father and husband, she also inherited their political and religious allegiances that would later lead to her downfall in the English Civil War. Both men were closely associated with Charles I, had links with George Villiers, 2nd Duke of Buckingham and both had enforced the king's policies for Essex in the case of Lord Rivers and Lancashire and Cheshire in the case of Lord Savage. Lady Rivers and her husband had both served in Queen Henrietta Maria's court as a Lady of the Bedchamber and Chancellor respectively, due to the family's strong Catholic links. Lady Rivers' father had been suspected of being a Papist, but was protected against recusancy legislation, although he was excluded from the county magistracy.

== Civil War ==
Following parliament's explanation of the ineffectual settlement with the king to have been caused by a Catholic conspiracy, local grievances heightened rumour and suspicion and Lady Rivers was presented to the Essex justices of the peace as a recusant and her home at St Osyth was searched for arms. Following the attack on Sir John Lucas at Colchester during the Stour Valley riots, St Osyth was ransacked and plundered by the crowds. Forewarned, Lady Rivers had fled to Long Melford but the crowds followed her there, attempting to also destroy that residence. According to a local story, Lady Rivers, upon also escaping Melford, threw a box with a string of pearls into a nearby pond before fleeing.

== Later life ==
Although attacked by the public in opposition to her family's association with the king and their religious patronage, Lady Rivers secured support from those who did not share the same views. Parliament later ordered her estates to be restored to her, but her tenants subsequently refused to pay rent. After the second episode of invasion of her estates by Parliamentarian soldiers, she sought permission to go to France in May 1643. After her return, she successfully petitioned Parliament to have her estates restored again, but the attacks on them and the fines imposed upon her and her son left her penniless. On her death in 1651, she was said to have been bankrupt and was buried at St Osyth with her ancestors.

== Ancestry ==
Ancestors of Elizabeth Savage, Countess Rivers

16. Roger Darcy (-1508)
8. Thomas, 1st Lord Darcy
17. Elizabeth Wentworth
4. John, 2nd Lord Darcy of Chiche (-1580)
18. John de Vere, 15th Earl of Oxford
9. Lady Elizabeth de Vere
19. Elizabeth Trussell
2. Thomas Darcy, 1st Earl Rivers
20. John Rich
10. Richard Rich, 1st Baron Rich
5. Frances Rich
22. William Jenks
11. Elizabeth Jenks (-1558)
23. Elizabeth Adams
1. `Elizabeth Savage, Countess Rivers
24. Robert Kitson
12. Sir Thomas Kytson
25. Margaret Smith (-1588)
6. Sir Thomas Kitson (1540-1604)
26. John Donnington (-1544)
13. Margaret Donnington (-1561)
27. Elizabeth Pye
3. Mary Kitson (-1644)
28. Sir John Cornwallis (1491-1544)
14. Sir Thomas Cornwallis
29. Mary Sulyard
7. Elizabeth Cornwallis
30. Sir John Jerningham
15. Anne Jerningham (1523-81)
31. Elizabeth, daughter of Sir Robert Drury
