= John Hooke (politician) =

English politician

John Hooke (c. 1605 – 14 May 1685) was an English politician who sat in the House of Commons between 1659 and 1661.

Hooke was the son of Henry Hooke of Bramshott, Hampshire. He matriculated at Magdalen College, Oxford on 28 February 1623, aged 17. He was a student of Middle Temple in 1623. In 1630 he was admitted to Queens' College, Cambridge.

Hooke was appointed High Sheriff of Hampshire for Jan-Nov 1649. In 1659, he was elected Member of Parliament for Haslemere until he was unseated on 31 March. In 1660 he was elected MP for Winchester in the ConventionParliament.

He died in 1685 and was buried at Bramshott. He had married Grissell, the daughter of Sir Francis Clarke of Hitcham, Buckinghamshire, with whom he had 2 sons and a daughter. After his death the property at Bramshott was sold.
