= Lawrence Hyde (MP for Winchester) =

Lawrence Hyde (ca. 1610 – September 1682) was a Royalist Member of Parliament for Winchester from 1661 to 1679.

He was a younger son of Lawrence Hyde (attorney-general). Edward Hyde, the Lord Chancellor, was his first cousin. In 1652 he married Anne, daughter of Sir John Glanville the younger, who had been Speaker of the House of Commons.
