= Gilbert Jackson =

English painter

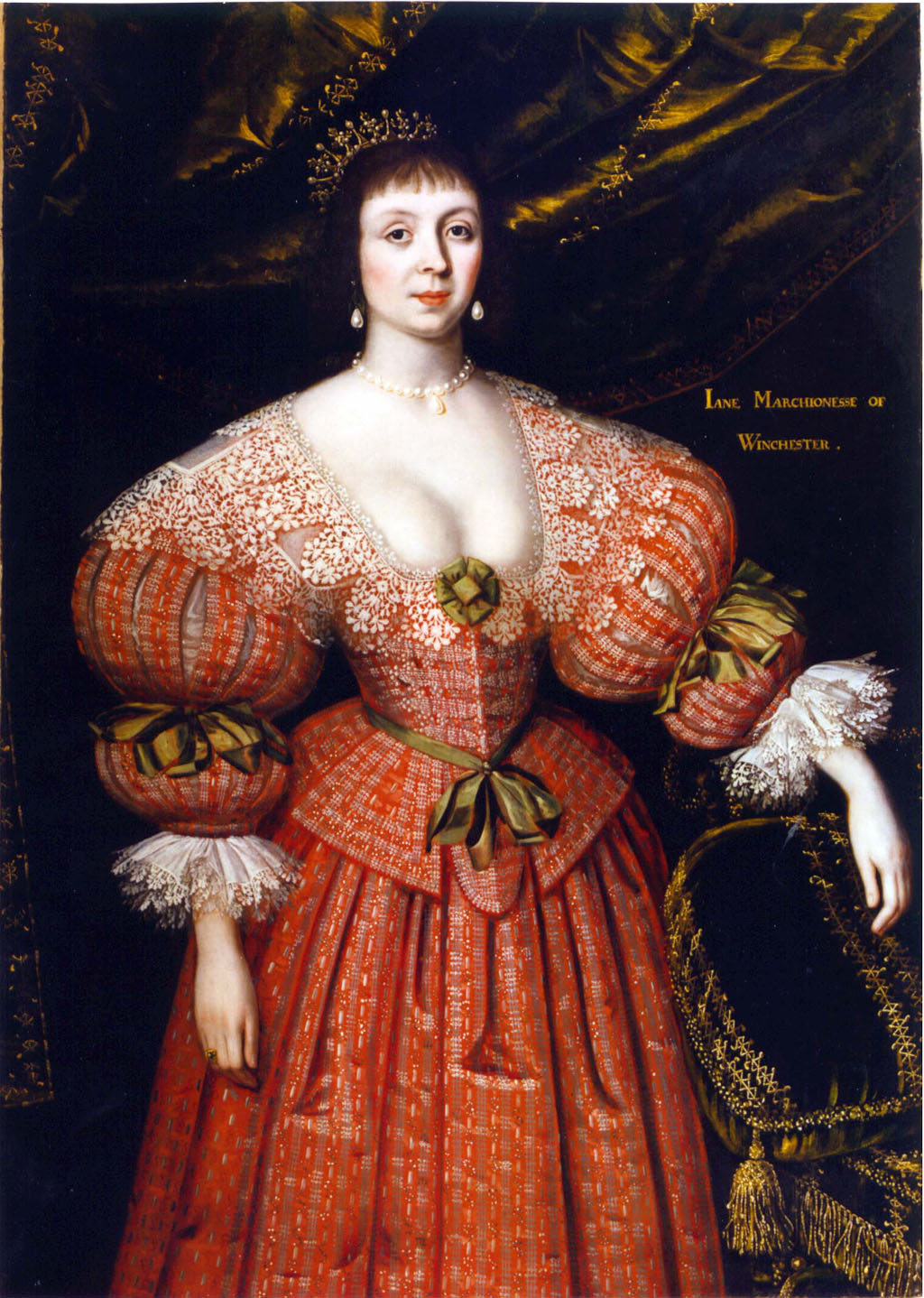
Gilbert Jackson. Portrait of Jane Savage, Countess of Winchester, 1632

Gilbert Jackson (c.1595/1600 – after 1648) was an English portrait painter active ca. 1621–1640s.

Never associated with the court, Jackson primarily painted portraits of provincial gentry and members of the professions. His work period is bracketed by the signed 1621 portrait of Edward Somerset, 4th Earl of Worcester and the 1643 signed and dated portrait of Chief Justice Sir John Bankes (1643), at Kingston Lacy in Dorset.

Little is known of Jackson's personal life. He likely trained in London under one of the masters of the Jacobean era, and after a career spanning twenty years, was made free of the Painter-Stainers' Company on 16 December 1640.

== Works ==
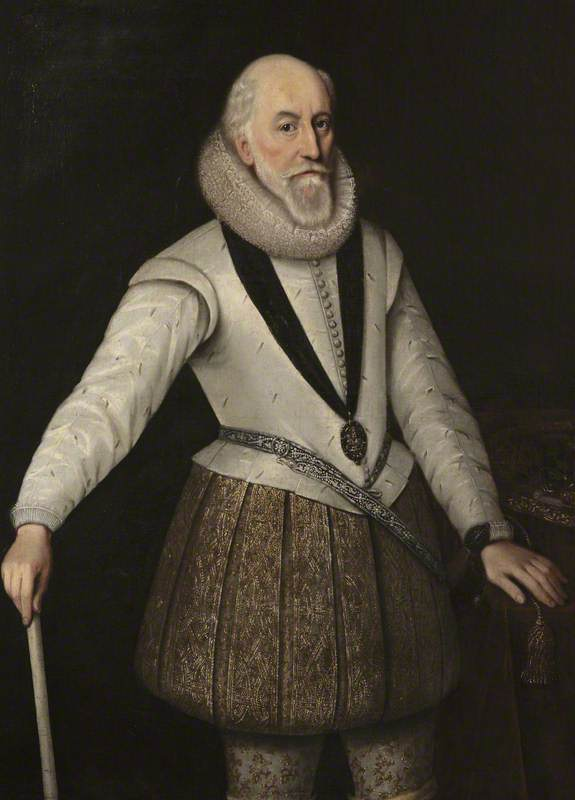
Edward Somerset, 4th Earl of Worcester (1621)

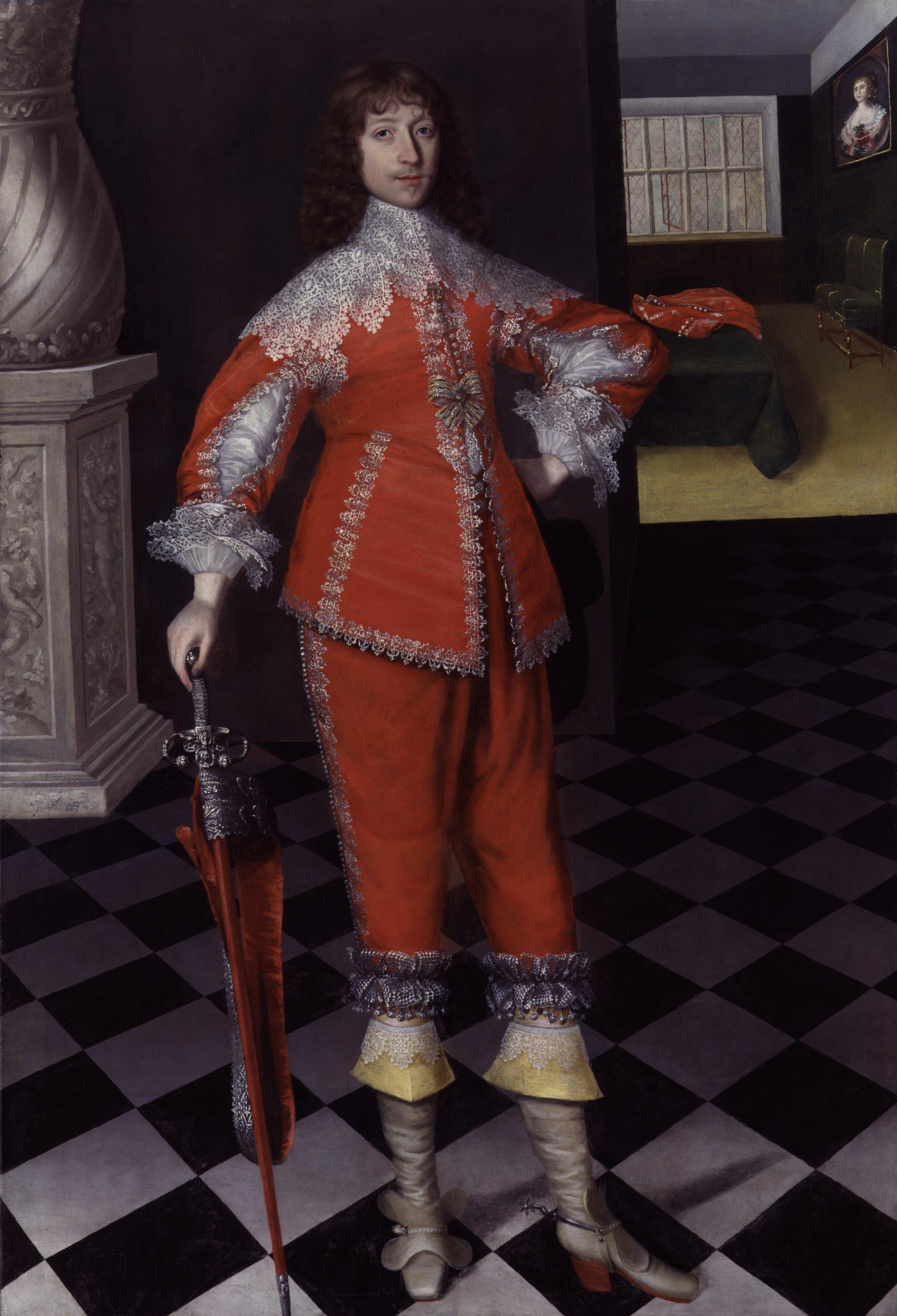
John Belasyse, 1st Baron Belasyse of Worlaby

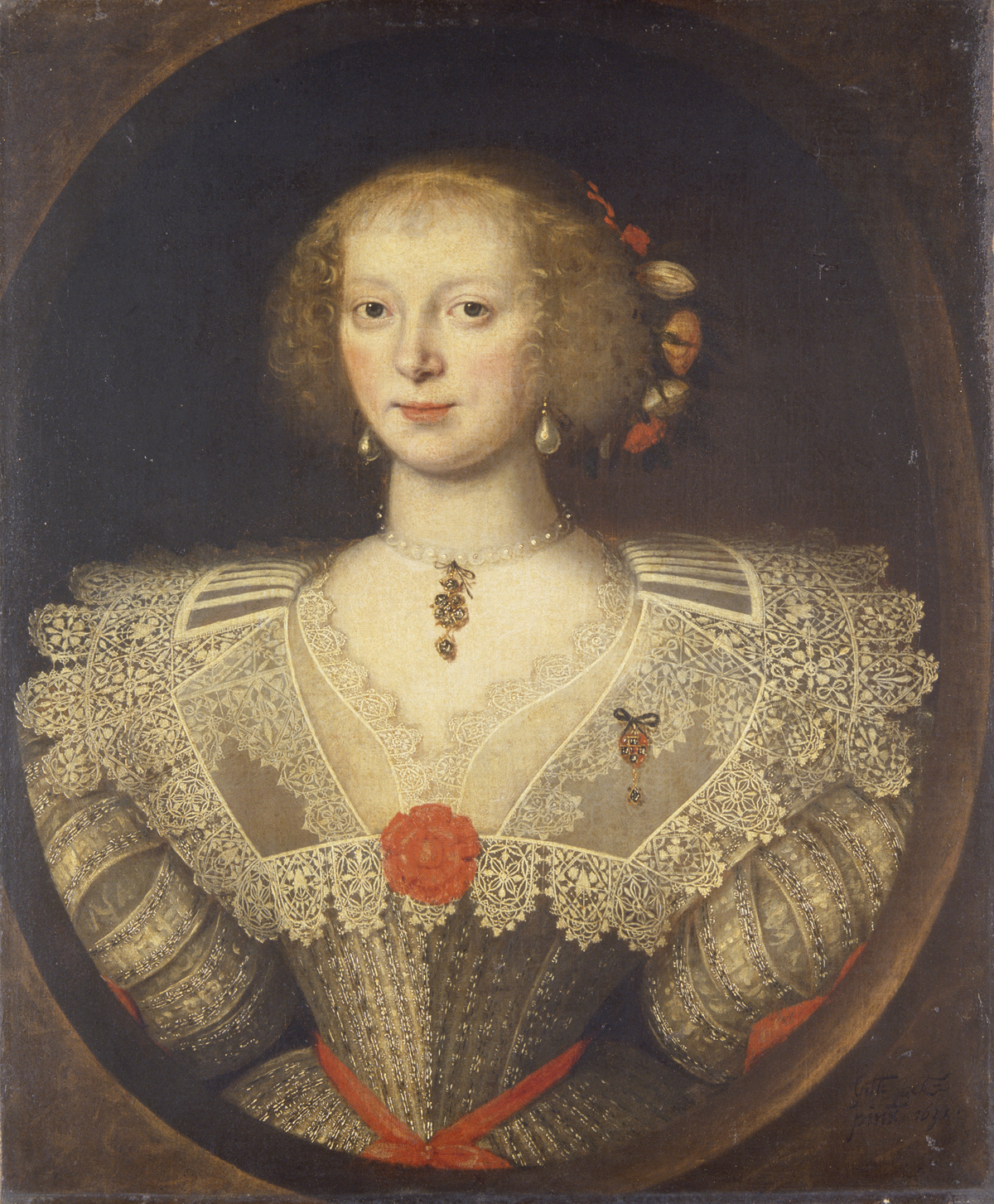
Jane Lambert

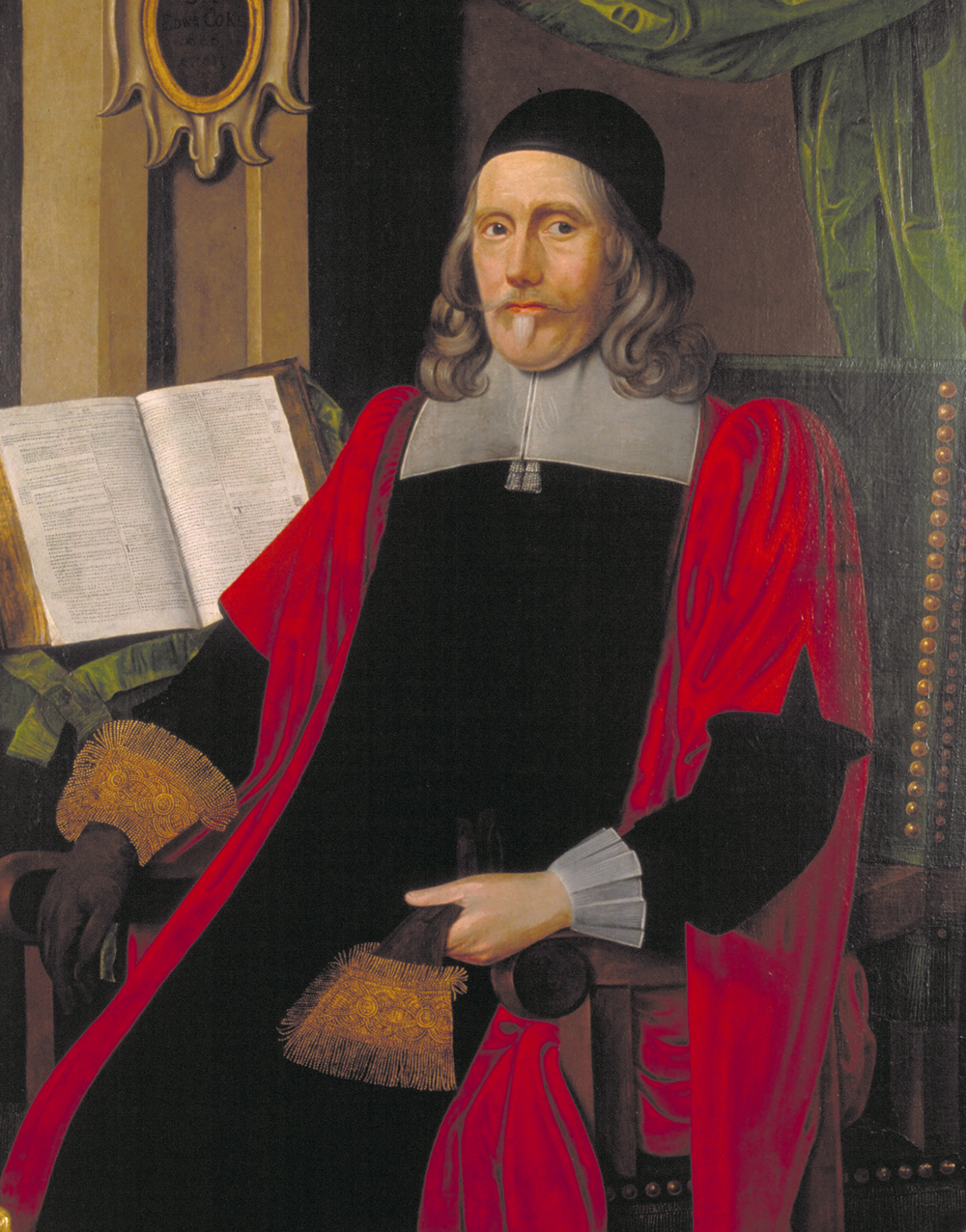
Sir Edward Coke
