= Savage family =

English gentry family

Savage (French: le Sauvage, Latin: Silvaticus) is an Anglo-Norman surname which was used by several English and Anglo-Irish knightly or gentry families, several of whom were politically important in England or Ireland.

The Oxford Dictionary of National Biography gives specific articles for the following prominent branches:

- The Ulster Savage family of approximately 1333–1519. They were lords of Lecale, in county Down. They held the castle of Ardkeen, and were seneschals of the liberty of Ulster.
- The Savage family of Kent, most notably the branch who held Bobbing, Kent and were important in the period 1280–c. 1420.
- The Savage family of Rocksavage in Clifton, Cheshire who were prominent c. 1369–1528.

== Savage of Ulster ==
The Ulster Savage family of approximately 1333–1519. They were lords of Lecale, in county Down. They held the castle of Ardkeen, and were seneschals of the liberty of Ulster.

== The Savage family of Kent ==
Coat of arms of Arnold Savage (d.1375)

Prominent members include the following:

- Sir Arnold Savage (died 1375). Knight who held several positions of note. Commissioner of array in Kent (1346), lieutenant of the Seneschal of Gascony (1350), Warden of the Coasts of Kent (1355) and Mayor of Bordeaux (1359–63)
- Sir Arnold Savage (8 September 1358 – 1410). Son of the former Sir Arnold. Knight who served as Speaker of the House of Commons and was involved in the suppression of the Peasants' Revolt in 1381.

== The Savage family of Rocksavage in Clifton ==
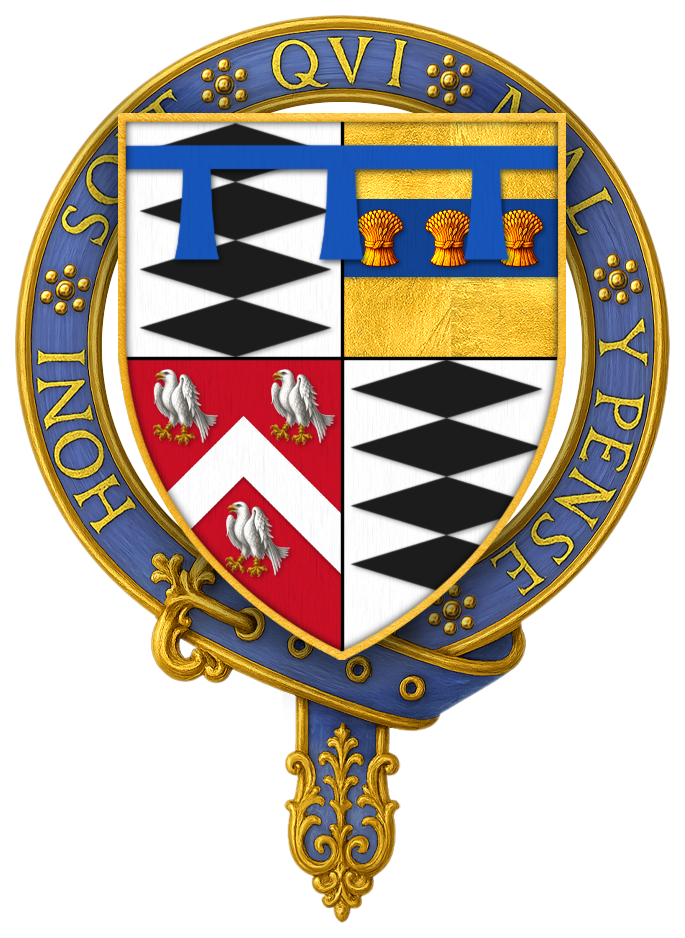
Arms of Sir John Savage as a Knight of the Garter

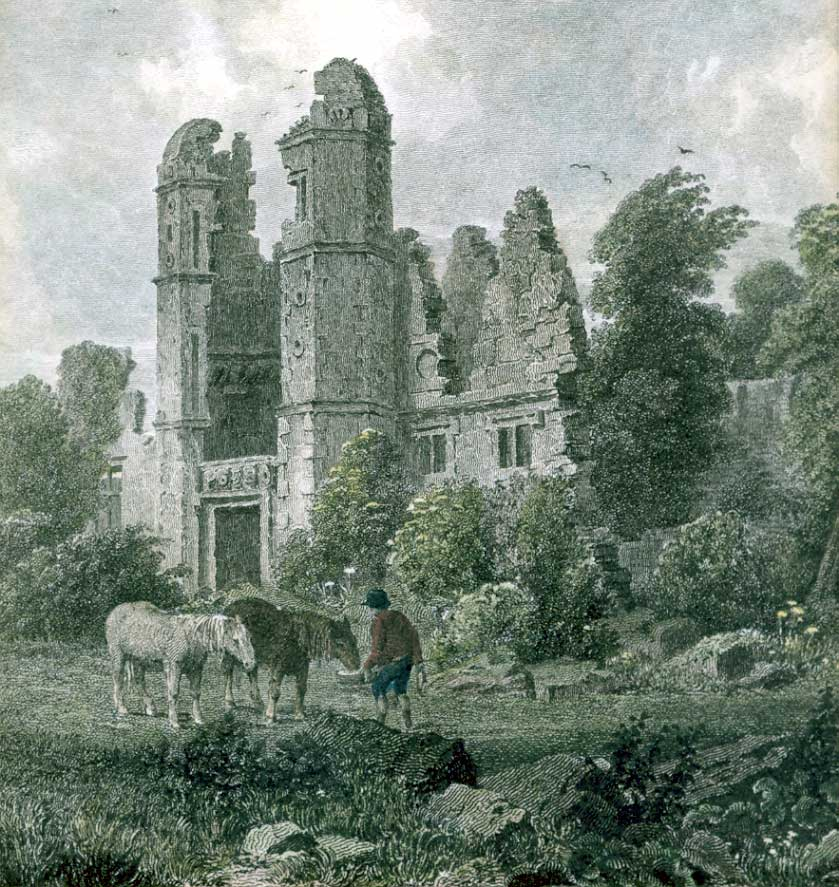
The ruins of Rocksavage Primary seat of the Cheshire Savage family

This family were established in Cheshire when Sir John Savage (died 1386) married Margaret d'Anyers, heiress of Clifton.

- Sir John Savage "II" (c.1370–1450). A knight who fought at the Battle of Agincourt and received his knighthood from Henry V for his service there.
- Sir John Savage ("V") (1444–1492) KG and KB. Knight and military commander (Knight banneret) who commanded the left flank of Henry VII's army to victory at the Battle of Bosworth Field where he is said to have personally slain the Duke of Norfolk in single combat, and ultimately helped to put Henry on the throne of England. Sir John also took part in the Battle of Barnet, the Battle of Tewkesbury (both 1471), the invasion of Scotland in 1482 and the Battle of Stoke Field in 1487. Following his victory at Bosworth Henry VII sent Sir John to arrest Sir Humphrey Stafford and his brother Thomas Stafford, who were key actors in the Stafford and Lovell rebellion, the first armed uprising against Henry's young reign. Sir John led 60 armed men to the abbey where the Staffords were hiding and had them forcibly removed. This event prompted a series of protests to Pope Innocent VIII over the breaking of the right of sanctuary which in turn resulted in a papal bull in August of the same year which agreed to some modifications affecting the privilege. He was killed at the Siege of Boulogne when he was intercepted whilst on reconnaissance and refused to surrender. Grandson of Lord Stanley and nephew of Thomas Stanley, 1st Earl of Derby. Left a legitimate son, also called Sir John Savage, who was the ancestor of the Earls Rivers, as well as an illegitimate son George Savage, who was the father of Edmund Bonner Bishop of London who was instrumental in the schism of Henry VIII from Rome before reconciling himself to Catholicism. He became notorious as "Bloody Bonner" for his role in the persecution of heretics under the Catholic government of Mary I of England, and ended his life as a prisoner under Queen Elizabeth.
- Archbishop of York Thomas Savage (1449 – 3 September 1507 - Bishop and diplomat, younger brother of Sir John Savage. Chaplain to King Henry VII. Served as Bishop of Rochester and Bishop of London before becoming Archbishop of York in 1501. Also Served as English ambassador to Castile and Portugal in 1488, during which time he helped broker the marriage treaty between Arthur, Prince of Wales and Catherine of Aragon in 1489 and then to France in 1490, where he participated in the conference at Boulogne. While Archbishop he played a part in the marriage ceremony of Arthur, Prince of Wales, to Catherine of Aragon. Prince Arthur died young, and his brother Henry, who became Henry VIII, then married Princess Catherine. Archbishop Savage had earlier led the ceremony by which Henry was made Duke of York. Built the Savage Chapel at St Michael's Church, Macclesfield which served as the Savage family chapel.

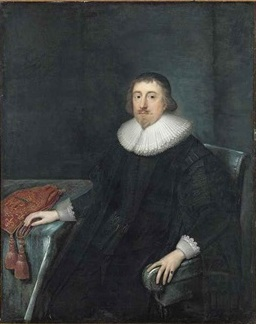
Thomas Savage, 1st Viscount Savage

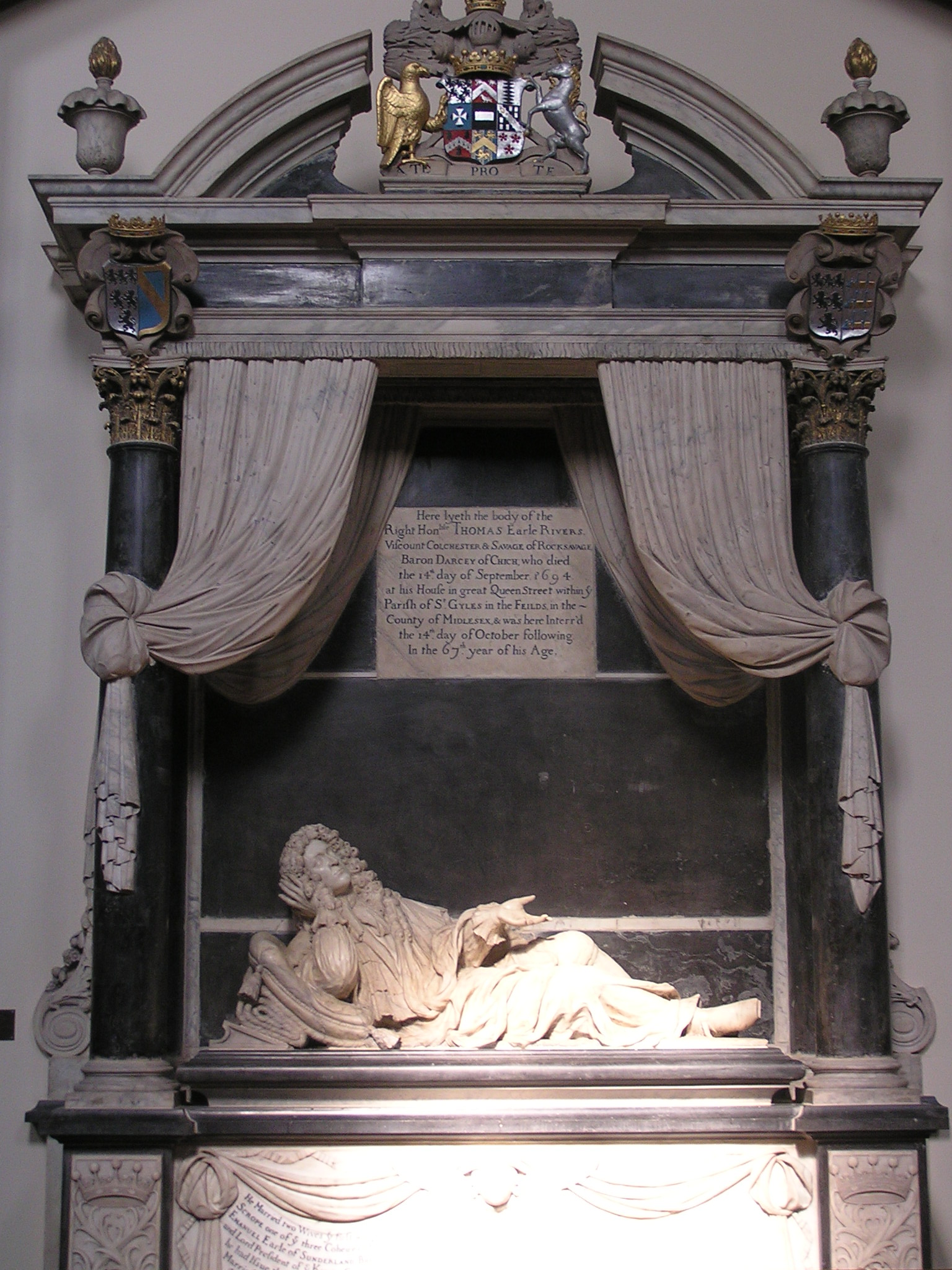
Tomb of Major General Thomas Savage, 3rd Earl Rivers in the Savage Chapel at St Michael's Church Macclesfield, Cheshire, UK

The Savages of Rocksavage married into several notable noble families such as the Stanleys and the Morleys. Before eventually ascending to the peerage themselves, first as Viscounts Savage and later as Earls Rivers.

- Thomas Savage, 1st Viscount Savage (c. 1586 – 20 November 1635) - Courtier of Charles I, served as First Commissioner of Trade and Commissioner to advise as to ways and means of increasing the King's revenue, and for the sale of the King's lands. Father of John Savage, 2nd Earl Rivers and husband of Elizabeth Savage, Countess Rivers.
- Elizabeth Savage, Countess Rivers and Viscountess Savage - English courtier and a Royalist victim of uprisings during the English Civil War. Daughter of Thomas Darcy, 1st Earl Rivers, wife of Thomas Savage, 1st Viscount Savage and mother of John Savage, 2nd Earl Rivers
- John Savage, 2nd Earl Rivers (25 February 1603 – 10 October 1654) - Member of Parliament for Cheshire and supporter of the Royalist cause. Raised the Earl Rivers Regiment of Foote in support of Charles I. Rocksavage was ruined for the first time as a result of his Royalist affiliation.
- Thomas Savage, 3rd Earl Rivers (c. 1628 – 14 September 1694) - Major General in the English army. Denounced as a Roman Catholic during the Popish Plot, although the Savage family had historically been Catholics the evidence was so flimsy that no charges were ever brought against him. Grandson of William Parker, 13th Baron Morley, 4th Baron Monteagle
- Richard Savage, 4th Earl Rivers (ca. 1654 – 18 August 1712) - General in the English and then British armies. Held the positions of Master-General of the Ordnance, Constable of the Tower of London and was briefly commander-in-chief of the forces in lieu of James Butler, 2nd Duke of Ormonde until his death. The Earl was the first nobleman and one of the first persons who joined the Prince of Orange on his landing in England, and he accompanied the soon to be King William to London. One of the first members to be sworn in as a member of the Privy Council of Great Britain following the Acts of Union under Queen Anne. Rumoured to have been the father of the poet Richard Savage. Father-in-law of Frederick Nassau de Zuylestein, 3rd Earl of Rochford and grandfather of William Nassau de Zuylestein, 4th Earl of Rochford and Richard Savage Nassau.

== Possible family member ==
- John Savage (died 1586) - One of the key Catholic conspirators of the Babington Plot to kill Elizabeth I of England and put the Catholic Mary, Queen of Scots on the throne. Savage was intended to be the member of the group who would personally assassinate Queen Elizabeth. He was violently executed along with his co-conspirators.

== See also ==
Refer to with caution!

- Armstrong, George Francis. The ancient and noble family of the Savages of the Ards. https://archive.org/details/ancientandnoble00armgoog
