= John Savage (soldier) =

English knight (1444–1492)

Sir John Savage KG KB PC
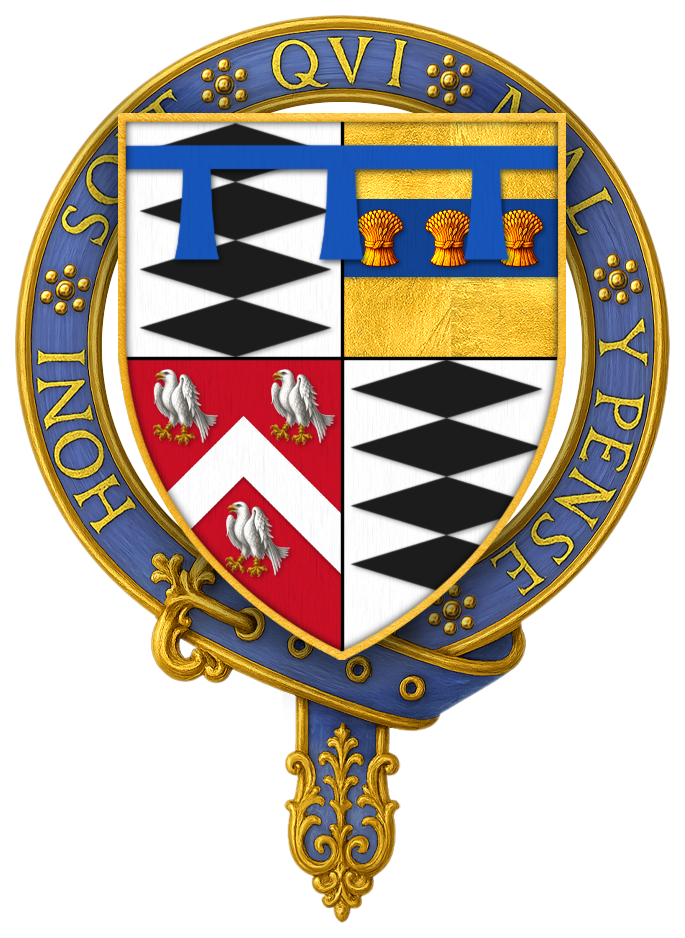
- Arms of Sir John Savage as a Knight of the Garter
- Born: c.1444 Cheshire, England
- Died: October, 1492 (aged 47–48); Boulogne, France
- Burial place: The Savage Chapel, St Michael's Church, Macclesfield, England
- Spouse(s): Dorothy, Lady Savage (m. 1470)
- Children: Sir John Savage, George Savage (ill.), Alice Savage, Felicia Savage, Ellen Savage, Maud Savage
- Relatives: Thomas Stanley, 1st Baron Stanley (grandfather); Sir John Savage (father); Lady Catherine Savage née Stanley (mother); Archbishop Thomas Savage (brother); Thomas Stanley, 1st Earl of Derby (uncle); Sir William Stanley (uncle); George Stanley, 9th Baron Strange (cousin); The Savage baronets The Viscounts Savage; The Earls Rivers; The Savage family
- Military career
- Allegiance: Kingdom of England
- Rank: Knight banneret
- Conflicts: Wars of the Roses; Battle of Barnet; Battle of Tewkesbury; Battle of Bosworth Field; Stafford and Lovell rebellion; Battle of Stoke Field; Anglo-Scottish Wars; English invasion of Scotland; English expeditionary force to France; Siege of Boulogne †
- Awards: Knight of the Order of the Garter; Knight of the Bath

Sir John Savage, KG, KB, PC (1444–1492), was an English knight of the Savage family, who was a noted military commander of the late 15th-century. Savage most notably fought at the Battle of Bosworth Field in 1485, where he commanded the left flank of the Tudor (Lancastrian) army to victory and is said to have personally slain the Duke of Norfolk in single combat. Earlier in the Wars of the Roses, Savage had been a supporter and friend of the Yorkist King Edward IV, fighting alongside him and helping him to victories at the Battle of Barnet in April 1471 and the Battle of Tewkesbury the following month. He returned to active military service in 1482 when he joined the invasion of Scotland led by the King's brother Richard, Duke of Gloucester, where the Duke made him a Knight banneret.

However, following the death of Edward and the Duke of Gloucester's ascension to the throne as Richard III, the Savage family was viewed with suspicion due to their familial connection to the Stanleys, who were in turn connected to the Tudors. Consequently, Savage was one of the prominent figures who invited Henry Tudor to invade England in 1485, a struggle which culminated in the Battle of Bosworth Field. After his victory, Henry Tudor received the circlet of Richard from Savage's uncle, Lord Stanley, and was crowned King of England on the field of battle, taking the throne as Henry VII of England.

The year following his victory at Bosworth, Henry VII sent Savage to arrest Sir Humphrey Stafford and his brother Thomas Stafford, who had risen up against the king in the first major challenge to Henry's reign. Savage led a force to Culham where the two were seeking sanctuary and had them forcibly removed. The brothers were tried and found guilty, Sir Humphrey was executed whilst Thomas was pardoned. This event was notable enough for Pope Innocent VIII to announce a papal bull which established modifications affecting the privilege of sanctuary, significantly limiting its practical use and vindicating the actions taken by Savage on behalf of the King.

Savage later served as one of two main cavalry commanders at the Battle of Stoke Field on 16 June 1487, where leading Yorkists fought to put the pretender Lambert Simnel on the throne. This was the final battle of the Wars of the Roses, with the engagement ending in a decisive victory for the Tudors and leaving nearly all of Henry's Yorkist opponents dead. In 1492, Savage raised a force of men-at-arms and archers and joined Henry's expeditionary force to France. The campaign was intended to stop the French King Charles VIII's support of the pretender to the throne of England, Perkin Warbeck. Savage would not return to England alive, losing his life during the Siege of Boulogne.

Savage was a supporter successively of Edward IV of England who appointed him a Knight of the Bath on the occasion of his Queen's coronation on 26 May 1465, and Henry VII, who appointed him a Knight of the Order of the Garter in 1488. Savage also served as a member of Henry VII's Privy Council.

== Ancestral background and family ==
=== Ancestral background and early life ===
John Savage was born in or around 1444, the son and heir of Sir John Savage (1422–1495) and Lady Catherine née Stanley, daughter of Thomas, Lord Stanley. Savage died three years before his father, thus he never succeeded to the family estates, which included Clifton Hall near Runcorn. The Savage family had been established in Cheshire since his great-great-grandfather Sir John Savage (1343–1386) married Margaret d'Anyers, heiress of Clifton and other lands around what later became Rocksavage.

The eldest of ten sons and five daughters, his younger brother, Dr Thomas Savage, became Archbishop of York, while another four brothers (Sir Edward, Sir Richard, Sir Christopher and Sir Humphrey Savage) were all knighted in recognition of their service to the crown. His sisters married into gentry families, including the Traffords, Booths, Duttons and Leighs. Among his other close relatives were his uncles Thomas Stanley (who was created Earl of Derby after Bosworth in 1485) and Sir William Stanley and his cousin George Stanley, 9th Baron Strange.

=== Family and descendants ===
Savage married Dorothy, daughter of Sir Ralph Vernon of Haddon. They had one legitimate son, Sir John Savage (1470–1527), ancestor of John Savage, 2nd Earl Rivers, and the subsequent Earls Rivers; and four legitimate daughters said to be Alice, Felicia, Ellen and Maud Savage. Savage also had an illegitimate son, George Savage, who was rumoured to have been the father of Edmund Bonner, the Bishop of London, who was an instrumental figure in the schism of Henry VIII from Rome before reconciling himself to Catholicism. Edmund became notorious as "Bloody Bonner" for his role in the persecution of heretics under the Catholic government of Mary I of England. He ended his life as a prisoner at Marshalsea prison during the reign of Queen Elizabeth I, and was 'buried at midnight to avoid a riot', such was the hatred for him.

== Early career, support for Edward IV and intrigue against Richard III ==
=== Edward IV's reign ===
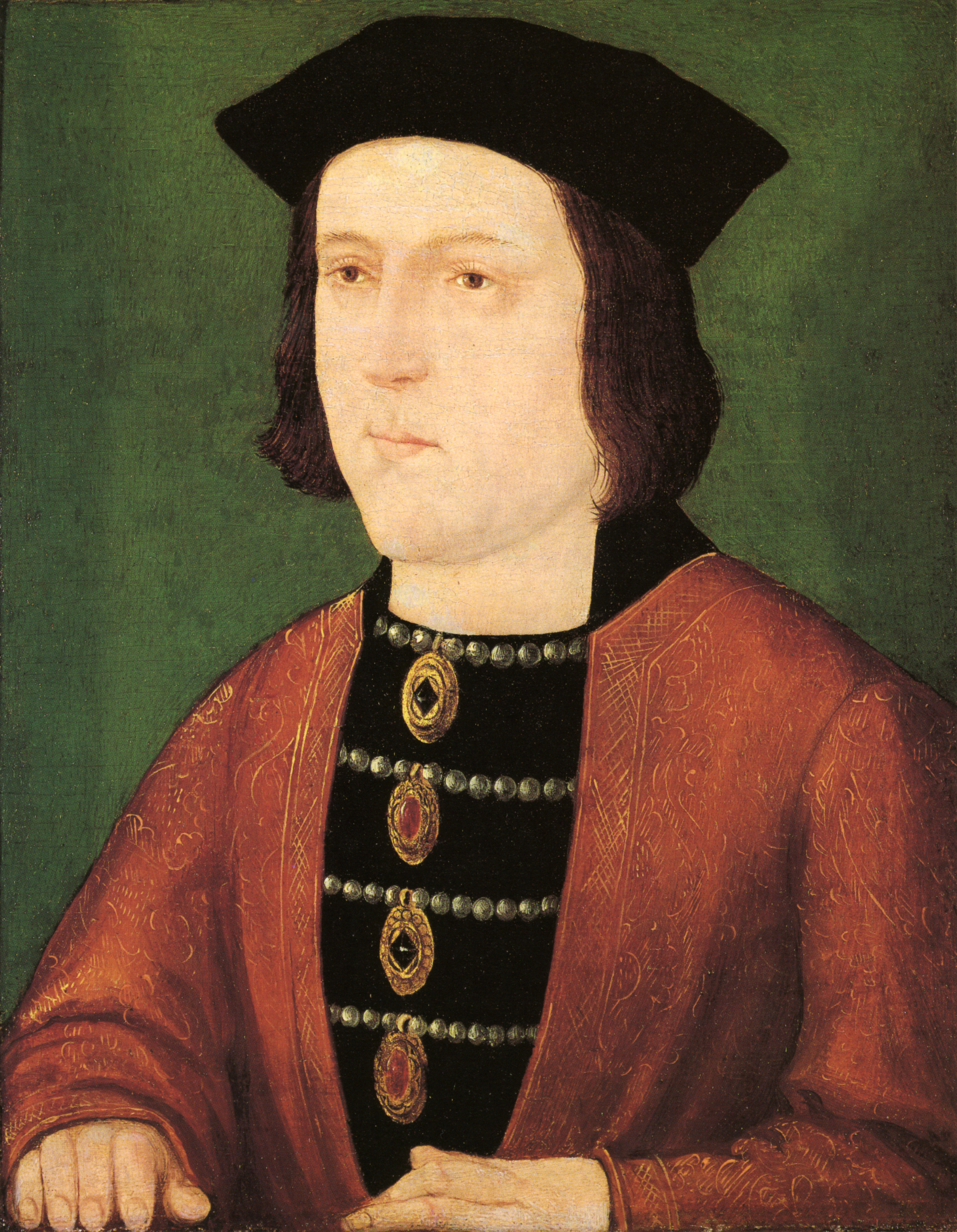
King Edward IV

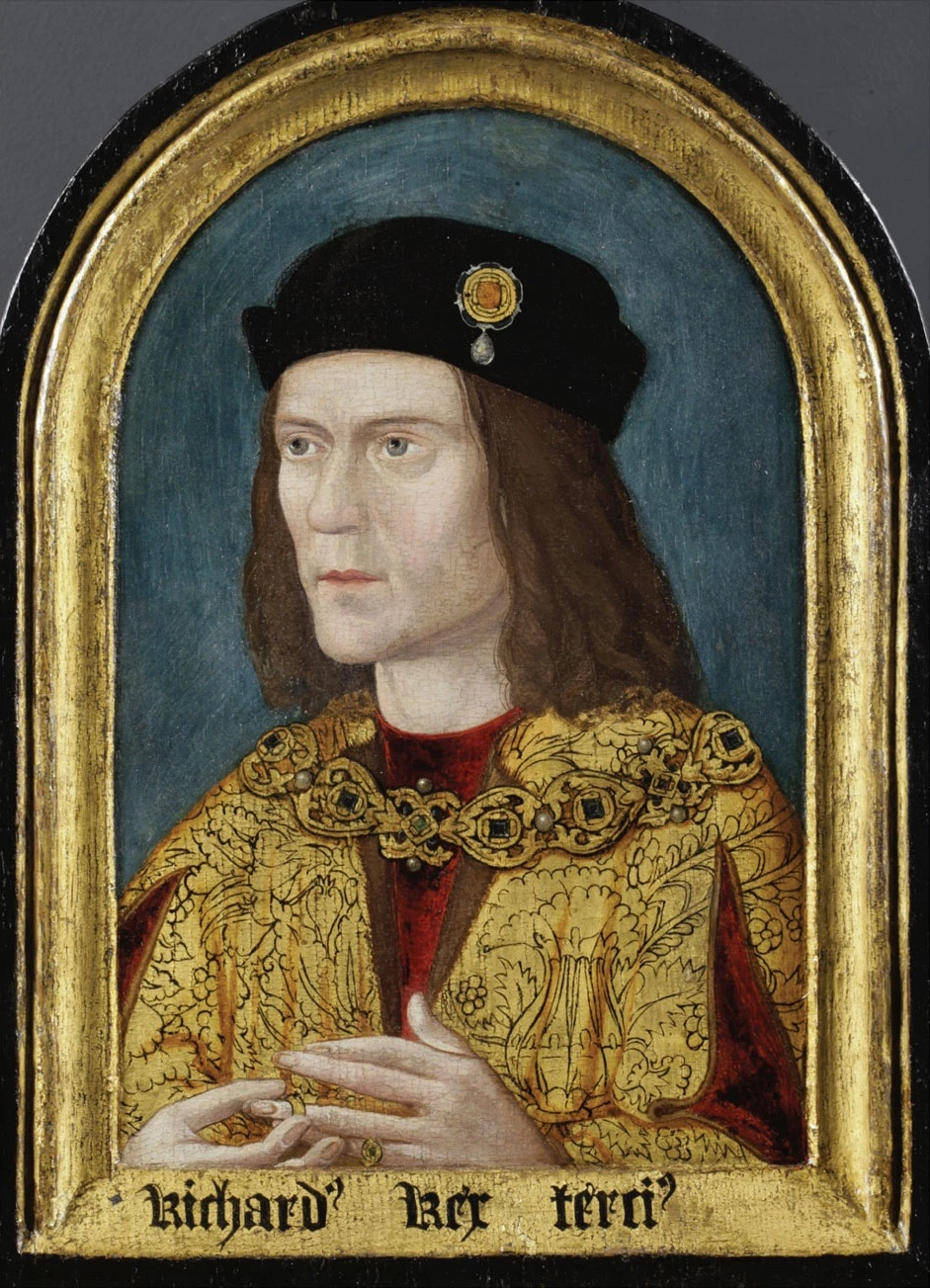
King Richard III

John Savage was made a Knight of the Bath by Edward IV on the occasion of his Queen's coronation on 26 May 1465. Savage fought for King Edward and the Yorkists at the Battle of Barnet in 1471 and the Battle of Tewkesbury later that same year, and joined the King's brother, the Duke of Gloucester, for the invasion of Scotland in 1482 (where he was made a knight banneret - a knight who commanded soldiers under their own banner). Savage became close to Edward IV, whom he served as royal carver and knight of the body, as well as being appointed by Edward to the position of the Constable of Hanley Castle. Following Edward's sudden death in 1483, Savage served as a pallbearer at his funeral, ranking second in precedence in the cortege that conveyed the King's body to Windsor.

=== Richard III's reign ===
Following the death of Edward, the Duke of Gloucester became the de facto ruler of England, dominating the short rule of his nephew Edward V, and then later becoming the de jure ruler after taking the throne as Richard III. This shortly preceded the mysterious death of Edward V, something which Richard was suspected of having played a part in. During Richard's reign, the Savage family were viewed with suspicion as a result of their support for Edward IV, connection to the Stanley family and the sheer size and influence of the Savage family (Sir John had 9 brothers, most of whom had some degree of influence). Sir John was admitted as a Freeman of Chester in 1484, during the mayoralty of his father. Moreover, in early 1485, eight of his nine brothers were made freemen of the city in a single ceremony. Although the family managed to retain their liberties, amongst rising suspicions Savage began to plot against the King. According to Polydore Vergil, Savage was one of the prominent men who invited Henry Tudor (a claimant to the throne through his descent from the Lancastrian branch of the House of Plantagenet) to invade England. Savage may have also been acting as a front man for his uncle Lord Thomas Stanley. Sir John's ninth brother, Thomas (later archbishop), was studying abroad at the time and almost certainly acted as the Savages' direct link to Henry. Savage's intrigue was discovered in August 1485, supposedly after the arrest of his cousin (and son of Lord Stanley) George Stanley, Lord Strange, and he was declared a traitor by Richard. Strange was held hostage and would later be used as leverage against his father.

== Support for Henry Tudor (later Henry VII of England) ==
=== Henry Tudor's landing in Britain and the Battle of Bosworth Field ===
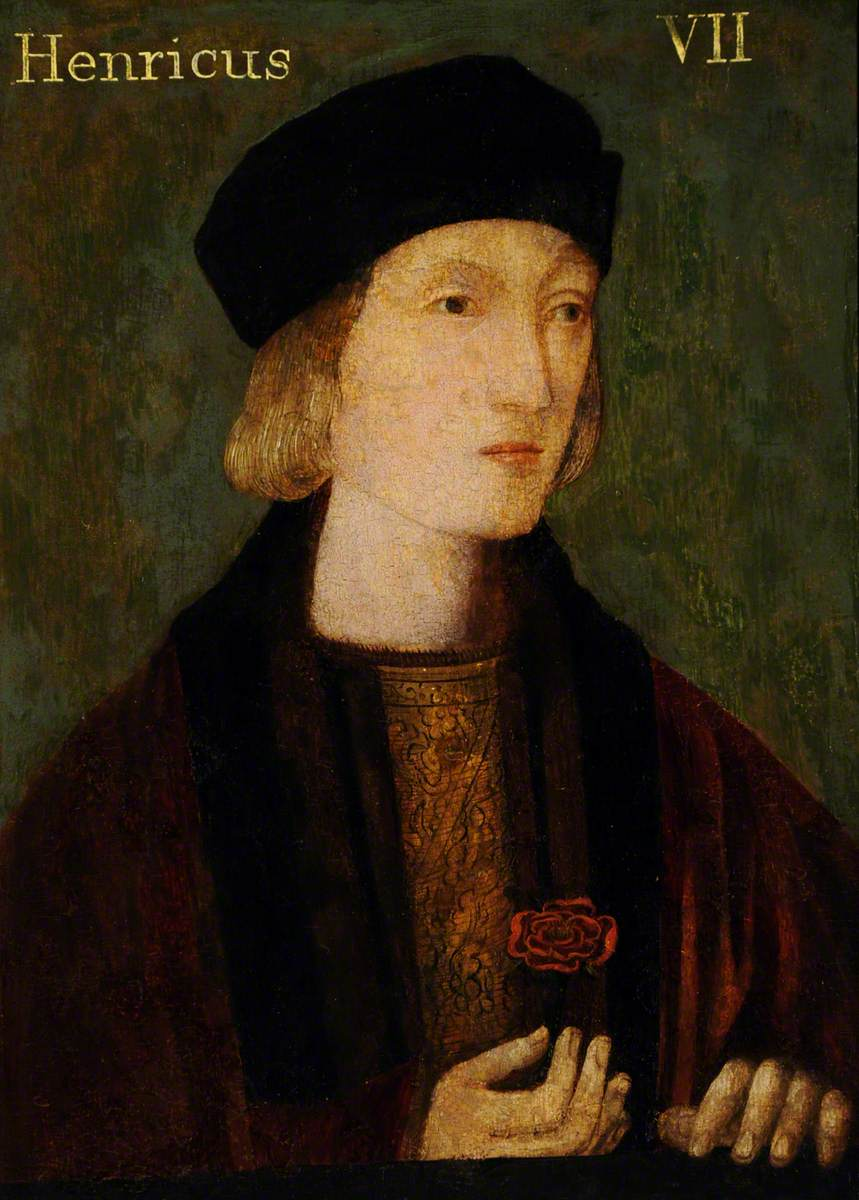
Henry Tudor as a young man before he took the throne as Henry VII

Henry landed in Britain around the same time that Savage was declared a traitor, and having avoided capture, Savage at once declared for him, raising a considerable body of troops (under his command as a knight banneret) to aid Henry's cause. Savage joined Henry on his march through Wales and fought for him at Bosworth Field. Savage and his men were originally in the army of his uncles Lord Thomas Stanley and Sir William Stanley, who would hold back whilst deciding which side it would be most advantageous to support. However, before the battle, Savage joined Henry's army along with three other knights; Sir Robert Tunstall, Sir Hugh Persall and Sir Humphrey Stanley, and Savage was placed in command of the left flank of the Tudor forces, where many of his own men fought, wearing the Savage family's distinctive livery of white hoods, as described in the ballad Bosworth Feilde:

Sir John Savage, that hardy Knight,
deathes dentes he delt that day
with many a white hood in fight,
that sad men were at assay.

and the Ballad of Lady Bessy:

Sir John Savage, 1500 white hoods,
for they will fight and never flee

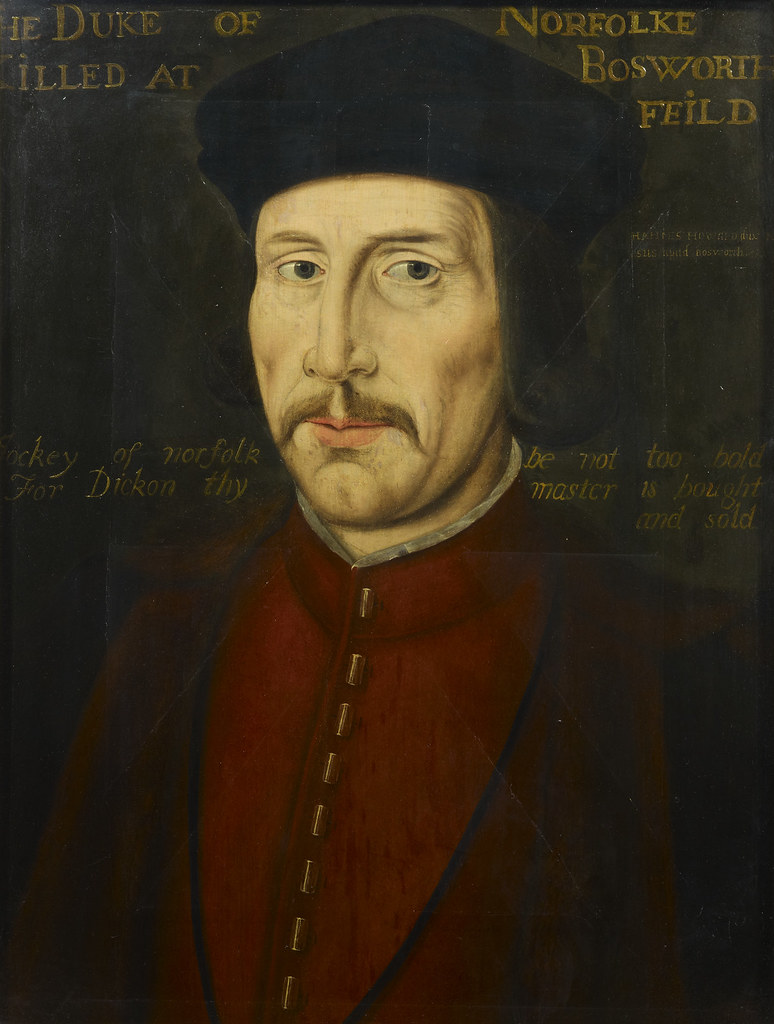
John Howard, 1st Duke of Norfolk whom Savage is said to have slain in battle

During the course of the battle, Savage is said to have personally slain the Duke of Norfolk in single combat as the Duke was attempting to flee, as well as taking his son, the Earl of Surrey, into custody. This is described in the Ballad of Lady Bessy:

The Duke of Northfolke wou'd have fledd with a good will
With twentye thousand of his company,
They went up to a wind millne upon a hill
That stood soe fayre and wonderousse hye,
There he met Sir John Savage, a royall knight,
And with him a worthy company.
To the death was he then dight,
And his son prisoner taken was he

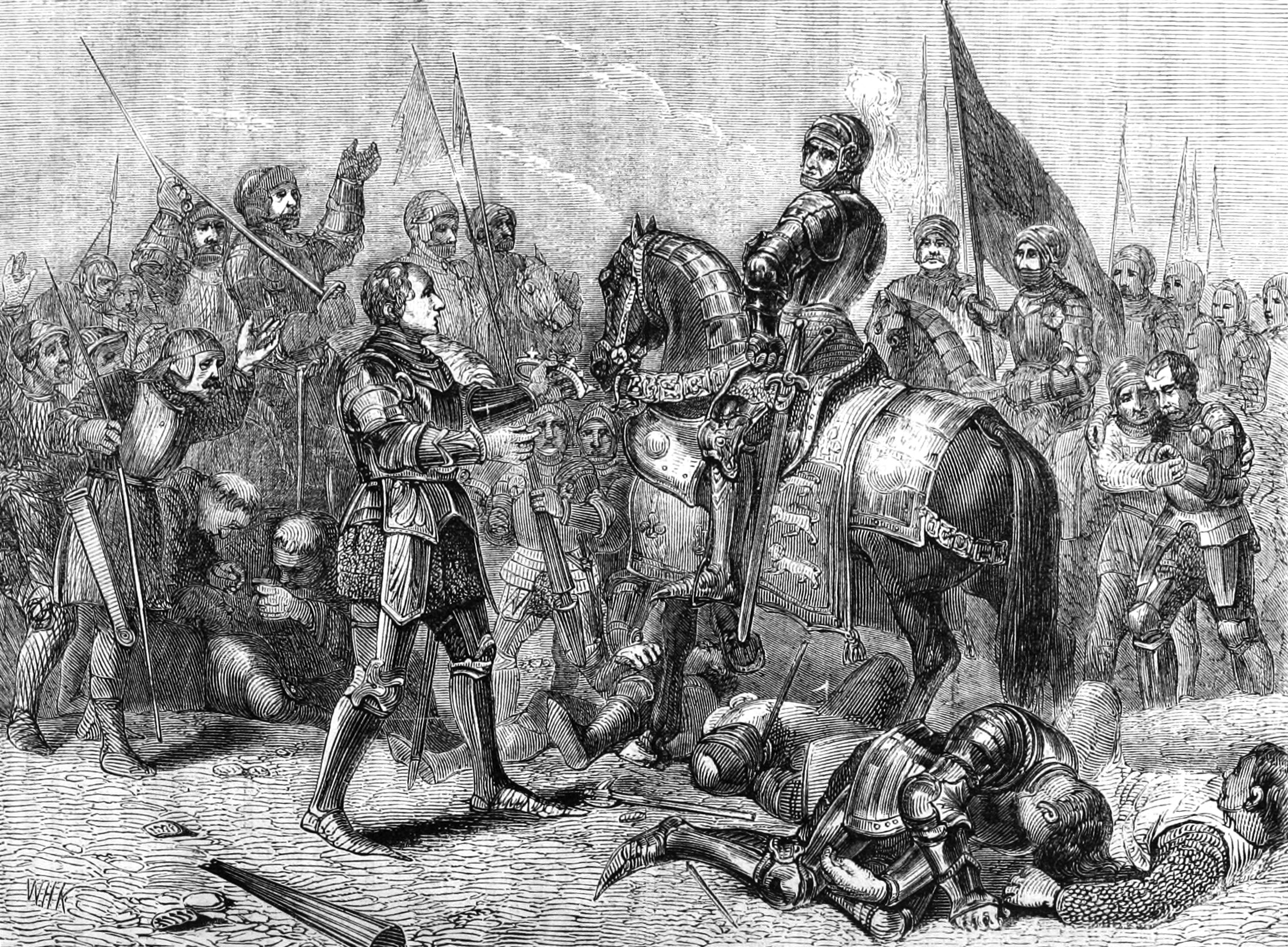
Savage's uncle Lord Stanley brings Henry Tudor the crown of King Richard III of England

The battle ended in a decisive victory for the forces of Henry Tudor, where Savage commanded the left flank to victory. His uncle, Sir William Stanley, seeing King Richard separated from the bulk of his force and headed for Henry, led his men into battle against Richard, surrounding and killing the King as his army fled. Savage's other uncle, Lord Stanley, was unable to commit his forces as Richard still had his son, Lord Strange, held as a hostage. Richard had sent Stanley a message threatening to execute Strange if he did not commit his troops to the battle, Stanley had rebutted this request stating that he 'had other sons', but was regardless unwilling to risk demonstrating his support for Henry.

=== The rewards of battle ===
Following his victory on the field of battle, Henry Tudor received the circlet of Richard from Savage's uncle Lord Stanley and was crowned King of England, taking the throne as Henry VII of England. For his part in the victory, Savage received extensive grants of land confiscated from King Richard's supporters in the counties of Nottinghamshire, Derbyshire, Leicestershire and Shropshire, including those of John, Lord Zouche, and Francis, Lord Lovell. The reason given for these grants was that they were made 'in consideration of his having largely exposed himself, with a crowd of his kinsmen, servants and friends, as volunteers in the king’s service in the battle against the King's great adversary Richard III the late pretended King of England, and also in consideration of other services rendered, always with anxious solicitude during prosperity as well as adversity'. Amongst the properties Sir John Savage received were the castle, manor and lordship of Gresley (Castle Gresley), and Kymbley (Kimberley) along with the manors and lordships of Grandby (Granby) and Sutton (all in Nottinghamshire), the manor and lordships of Elmeton (Elmton), Holmesfeld (Holmesfield) and Ilkeston (as well as a coal mine in Ilkeston) in Derbyshire, the manor and lordship of Shepeshed (Shepshed) in Leicestershire and 22s rent in the then town of Leicester, as well as the manors and lordships of Sutton Hubybunderell, Watton, Corston and Eudunburnell in the county of Shropshire (then known as Salop) taken from the estates of Francis, Lord Lovell.

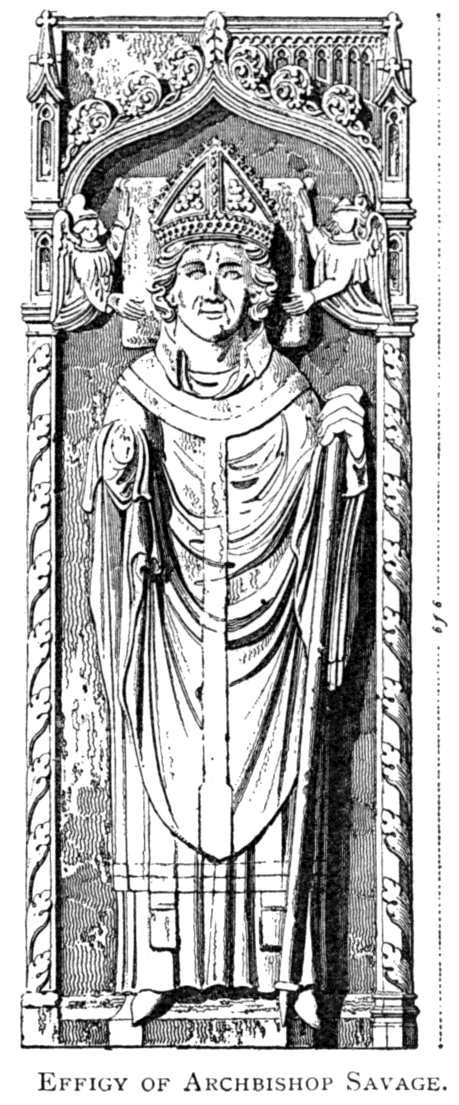
An effigy of Archbishop Thomas Savage, brother of Sir John Savage

Sir John's brother, Dr Thomas Savage, also benefited greatly from Henry's ascension to the throne. Previously only a rector and scholar, he now received appointments to several positions of power and prestige; he first received important diplomatic appointments as the English ambassador to Castile and Portugal in 1488 and then France in 1490, where he took part in the conference at Boulogne. Before beginning a career as a high ranking cleric (prelate), Thomas served as a bishop in several dioceses as well as becoming chaplain to King Henry. He eventually became the second most senior cleric in England when he was made Archbishop of York and Primate of England in 1501, a position which he held until his death in 1507. Both Sir John and Dr Thomas became part of the King's inner circle, and of 11 known meetings of the King's council in the months June–July 1486, one or both of the brothers was present at eight.

=== The Stafford and Lovell rebellion and the right of sanctuary ===
Arms of the Most Noble Order of the Garter to which Savage was appointed by Henry VII in 1488

In 1486, the year following his victory at Bosworth, King Henry sent Savage to arrest Sir Humphrey Stafford and his brother Thomas Stafford, who were key actors in the Stafford and Lovell rebellion, the first armed uprising against Henry's young reign. Savage led a force of 60 armed men to Culham where the two were seeking sanctuary in a church belonging to Abingdon Abbey (having previously claimed sanctuary in Colchester following the Battle of Bosworth, before leaving and continuing their campaigns against the king) and had them forcibly removed. The men had again claimed the right of sanctuary and believed themselves safe within the Abbey's walls. Their forced removal outraged the Abbot who sent a written complaint to the authorities about what he saw as an infringement of his abbey’s ancient privileges as a place of sanctuary. However when the two men were tried before the Court of King's Bench the justices ruled that sanctuary was not applicable in cases of treason Henry then ordered the execution of Sir Humphrey Stafford of Grafton, but pardoned the younger Thomas Stafford. This event prompted a series of protests to Pope Innocent VIII over the breaking of the right of sanctuary. In addition to these protests, King Henry sent a letter to the Pope detailing several instances where dissidents had claimed sanctuary before carrying out hostile actions such as pillaging properties of the King's supporters, before simply returning to sanctuary. These pleas resulted in a papal bull in August of the same year which agreed to some modifications affecting the privilege. Namely that individuals could not return to a place of sanctuary should they commit crimes after leaving the premises, validating the actions of King Henry and Sir John Savage towards the Stafford brothers. The Pope also told the English clergy that they would lose all rights to his protection should they collaborate with the King's enemies.

=== The Battle of Stoke Field and appointment to the Most Noble Order of the Garter ===
Savage was later one of the two main cavalry commanders (the other having been Lord Scales, with Savage commanding the larger left flank of cavalry) at what is considered to have been the final battle of the Wars of the Roses, the Battle of Stoke Field in 1487, a conflict stemming from an attempt by leading Yorkists to unseat King Henry in favour of the pretender Lambert Simnel. The battle was a decisive victory with almost all the leading Yorkists killed, and never again would a battle be fought along Yorkist and Lancastrian lines. The pretender Lambert Simnel was not executed or even imprisoned, this owing to his young age and the belief that he had been led astray. He instead received employment, first in the royal kitchens and later as a falconer. Savage was further rewarded for his service to the King, the following year on 16 February 1488 he received fresh grants of land, and later on 16 November 1488 the King appointed Savage a knight of the Order of the Garter, (the most senior order of knighthood in England, whose membership is limited to only 24 knights and is granted by the monarch alone) having already been made a Knight of the Bath and a Knight banneret.

=== Perkin Warbeck and the expedition to France ===
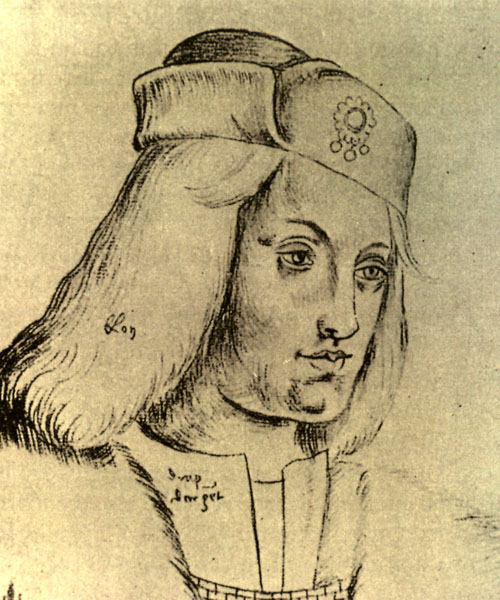
Contemporary portrait of Perkin Warbeck the pretender to the English throne, whose presence in France prompted the formation of the English expeditionary force

In October 1492, following the appearance of another pretender to the throne of England in the form of a young Flemish male named Perkin Warbeck, Savage raised a retinue of 366 men, made up of 36 men-at-arms and 330 archers (initially promised 60 men-at-arms and 140 archers) and joined King Henry, who had called for the formation of an expeditionary force of 12,000 men. The expeditionary force was headed to France, with the intention of stopping Charles VIII of France's support for Warbeck. Charles had granted Warbeck sanctuary in France from 1491, and opponents of Henry's rule both home and abroad were attempting to legitimise their dissent through the form of a potential claimant to the throne of England. The force provided by Savage was amongst the largest in the expeditionary force, and received the largest payment of wages of any retinue barring the King's own guard. In 1492 Savage was one of only 11 men in England capable of assembling what have been referred to as 'greater companies', or in other words those that could raise more than 20 men-at-arms. In practice however, only eight men raised such retinues in preparation for the invasion, of whom Savage was one. Savage raised more men than titled nobles such as Thomas Grey, 1st Marquess of Dorset, Edward Courtenay 1st Earl of Devon and George Talbot, 4th Earl of Shrewsbury. In mid October Henry and his men crossed the English Channel and landed in Calais.

== Death and legacy ==
=== The Siege of Boulogne ===
Henry VII's expeditionary force headed to Boulogne and laid siege to the port city on 18 October 1492. Sir John Savage was killed during the course of this siege. Whilst riding around the walls of the city with fellow Bosworth veteran Sir John Riseley in order to conduct a reconnaissance of the walls and fortifications in preparation for the military offensive, the two knights were intercepted by the enemy. Despite being heavily outnumbered Savage refused to surrender to his foes and fought to his death. His actions created enough of a diversion to allow Riseley to escape and flee on 'a most speedy horse'. Save for this the siege was largely uneventful and was broken off after several weeks when the French King Charles VIII offered King Henry favourable terms.

=== Legacy of the siege ===
The siege proved to be a successful show of force, and led to the Treaty of Etaples by which Perkin Warbeck was expelled from France with his support withdrawn. The terms of the treaty also included the English accepting French control of Brittany, and the French paying Henry an indemnity of 742,000 crowns, payable at 50,000 crowns per annum, equivalent to 5% of the crown's annual income. Savage was one of only three named casualties of the siege, the other two being George de Vere and Sir Thomas Milbone.

Warbeck was eventually captured following the second of his two landings in England, and the collapse of the army he had raised. He was later executed following an escape attempt. Savage's uncle Sir William Stanley was also later executed for allegedly supporting Warbeck, although the evidence was only circumstantial. Such was the perceived threat posed by Warbeck that no leniency could be afforded, even for those who had helped put Henry on the throne.

=== Burial of Sir John Savage ===
Savage's body was taken back to England and buried. His body was later moved to the Savage Chapel, the new family chapel at St Michael's Church, Macclesfield (built between 1505 and 1507 by his brother Archbishop Thomas Savage), where his tomb and effigy remain. Savage's death came at a time when he was at the height of his favour with King Henry and the Tudor dynasty was becoming ever more settled on the throne that Savage had helped gain.

== Notes ==
1. The year of Savage's birth is not certain but it is estimated he was around 21 at the time he received his initial knighthood, meaning he was likely born in or around the year 1444
