= Siege of Boulogne =

Siege of Boulogne may refer to:

- Siege of Boulogne (1492)
- Sieges of Boulogne (1544–1546)
