= David Blatherwick =

David Blatherwick may refer to:

- David Blatherwick (artist) (born 1960), Canadian artist
- David Blatherwick (diplomat) (born 1941), retired British diplomat
