= St Michael's Church, Macclesfield =

Coordinates: 53.2603°N 2.1244°W

St Michael and All Angels Church, Macclesfield
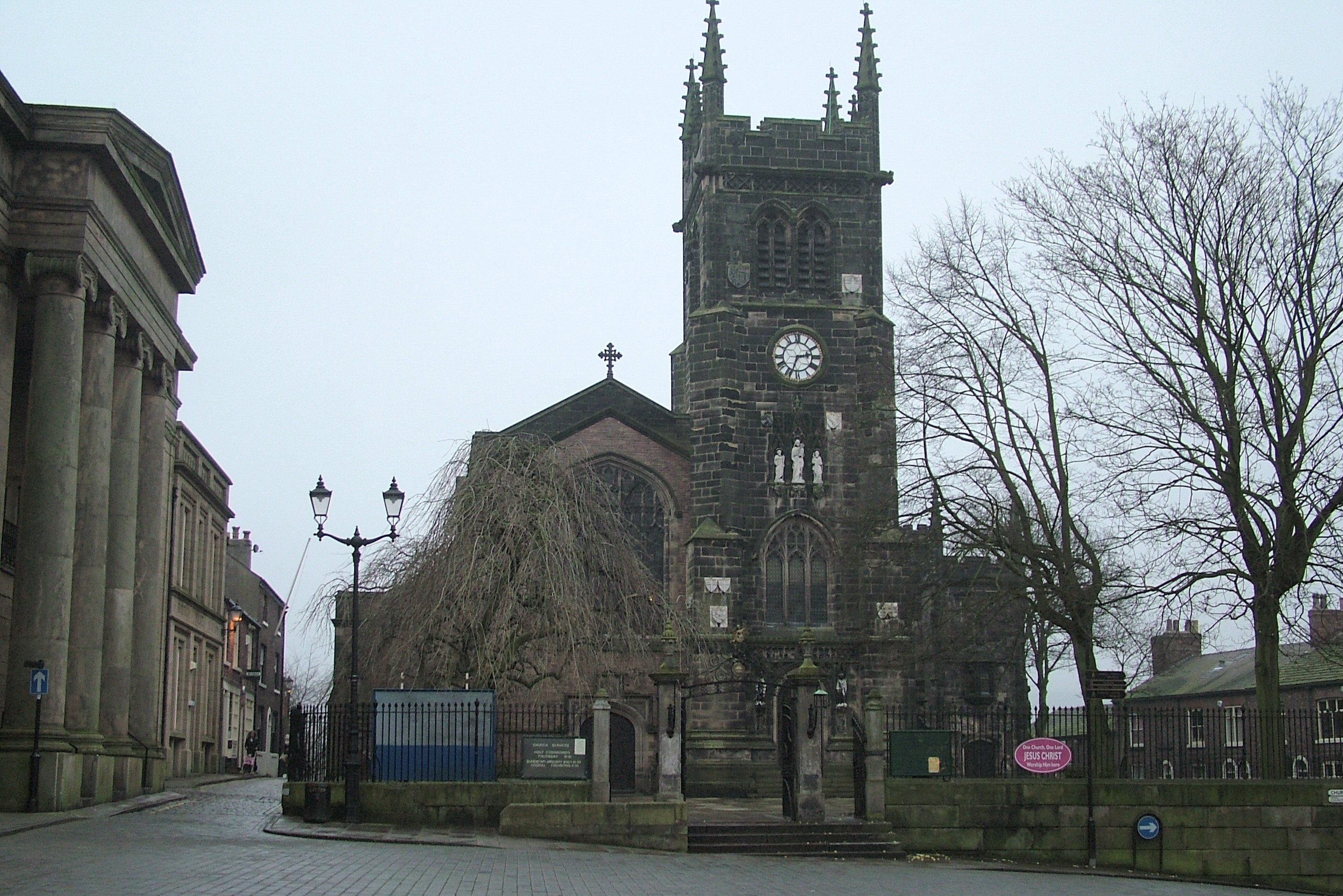
- St Michael's Church, Macclesfield, from the west

- Location in Cheshire
- OS grid reference: SJ 917 737
- Location: Macclesfield, Cheshire
- Country: England
- Denomination: Anglican
- Website: St Michael's, Macclesfield

History
- Status: Parish church
- Dedication: Saint Michael
- Consecrated: 1278

Architecture
- Functional status: Active
- Heritage designation: Grade II*
- Designated: 14 April 1949
- Architect: Arthur Blomfield
- Architectural type: Church
- Style: Gothic, Gothic Revival
- Completed: 1901

Specifications
- Materials: Red sandstone Stone-flagged roof

Administration
- Province: York
- Diocese: Chester
- Archdeaconry: Macclesfield
- Deanery: Macclesfield
- Parish: The Macclesfield Team Parish

Clergy
- Rector: Martin Stephens

St Michael and All Angels Church overlooks Market Place in the town of Macclesfield, Cheshire, England. It is an active Anglican parish church in the diocese of Chester, the archdeaconry of Macclesfield and the deanery of Macclesfield. It forms a team parish with three other Macclesfield churches: All Saints, St Peter's and St Barnabas'. The church is recorded in the National Heritage List for England as a designated Grade II* listed building.

A church has been on the site since the 13th century. There have been two major reconstructions, the last being in 1898–1901. Two ancient chapels remain dating from the 15th and 16th centuries. Inside the church are a number of tombs and memorials, mainly to the memory of the Savage and Legh families.

== History ==
The first church on this site was a chapel built around 1220, soon after the borough of Macclesfield was established. Around 1278 it was extended or rebuilt by Queen Eleanor, wife of Edward I and dedicated to All Saints or All Hallows. A chapel, known as the Legh chapel, was built around 1442 for Sir Piers Legh who fought and died at the Battle of Agincourt. Between 1505 and 1507 the Savage Chapel, a larger chantry chapel, was built by Thomas Savage, Archbishop of York from 1501 to 1507.

There have since been a number of reconstructions of the church. In 1739–40 it was rebuilt in neoclassical style and at this time it is likely that the church was rededicated to Saint Michael. In 1740 the wooden tower was taken down because it was considered dangerous. In 1819 the east end was rebuilt and a new chancel added. The last major rebuilding was in 1898–1901 by Arthur Blomfield when the whole church, other than part of the chancel and the Legh and Savage chapels, were replaced.

A further reordering, known as "Open Door" Phase 1, took place between June 2003 and May 2004 to provide a welcome area (narthex), meeting rooms and an office at the west end. A second phase followed in which the room to the southeast of the building was equipped as a Youth Centre. As part of the "Open Door Reordering", extensive repair work was carried out to the church roof and to the church organ which was completely dismantled, cleaned, repaired and re-built. The architectural works were carried out by Barlow, Wright and Phelps, of Buxton, Derbyshire.

== Architecture ==
=== Exterior ===
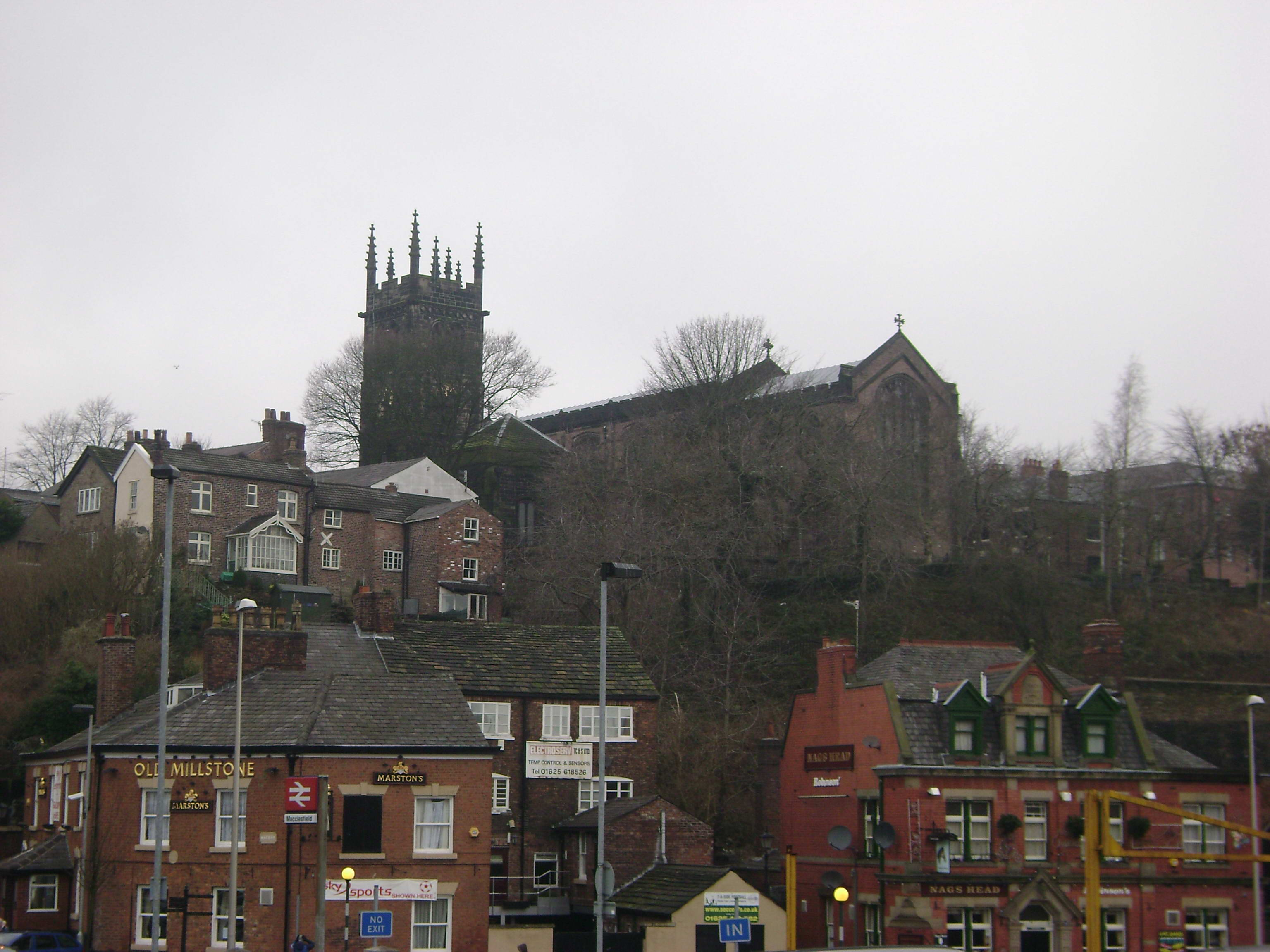
St Michael's Church from Macclesfield railway station

The plan of the church consists of a six-bay nave with north and south aisles and a chancel with vestries to the north and south. The tower is at the west end of the south aisle. The Legh Chapel extends from the south aisle and the larger Savage Chapel is to the east of this. At the west end of the Savage Chapel is a porch surmounted by a tower. The main tower incorporates some of the earlier masonry and includes some of the original carved stones and heraldic shields representing local noble families. On its west face is a clock and beneath this is a niche containing statues representing the Virgin and Child, Saint John and Saint James.

=== Interior ===
==== Furnishings ====
The font consists of a baluster and a fluted bowl dated 1744. The reredos, altar table, and communion rail dating from 1946 were designed by Sir Charles Nicholson. Behind this reredos is an older one from 1820, in Gothic style, containing arcades with ogee heads. The pulpit dates from 1876 and contains carvings of apostles. The wardens' pew is Jacobean in style. Two chandeliers are present, one dated 1882, the other was donated in 1744 and remodelled in 1822. In the porch of the Savage Chapel are fragments of medieval glass. The east window, dating from 1901, and the west window from 1902 (the latter depicting Queen Victoria), are by Powells. On the north side of the church are windows by Kempe, and by Burlison and Grylls. The Legh Chapel contains glass by Shrigley and Hunt dated 1903. On the northeast of the nave is glass by Christopher Whall, from about 1910, and by Paul Woodroffe. In the Savage Chapel the glass is all by Morris & Co., dating from the early 20th century. The two-manual organ was made by Percy Daniel and Company. There is a ring of 12 bells, all cast in 1923 by John Taylor and Company.

=== Chapels and monuments ===
The major points of interest in the church are the chapels and the monuments. The church contains "the finest collection of alabaster effigies in Cheshire". The smaller Legh Chapel, built around 1422 and rebuilt in 1620, is now used as a baptistry. It contains a number of memorial brasses, including one to William Legh who died in 1630.

==== The Savage Chapel ====
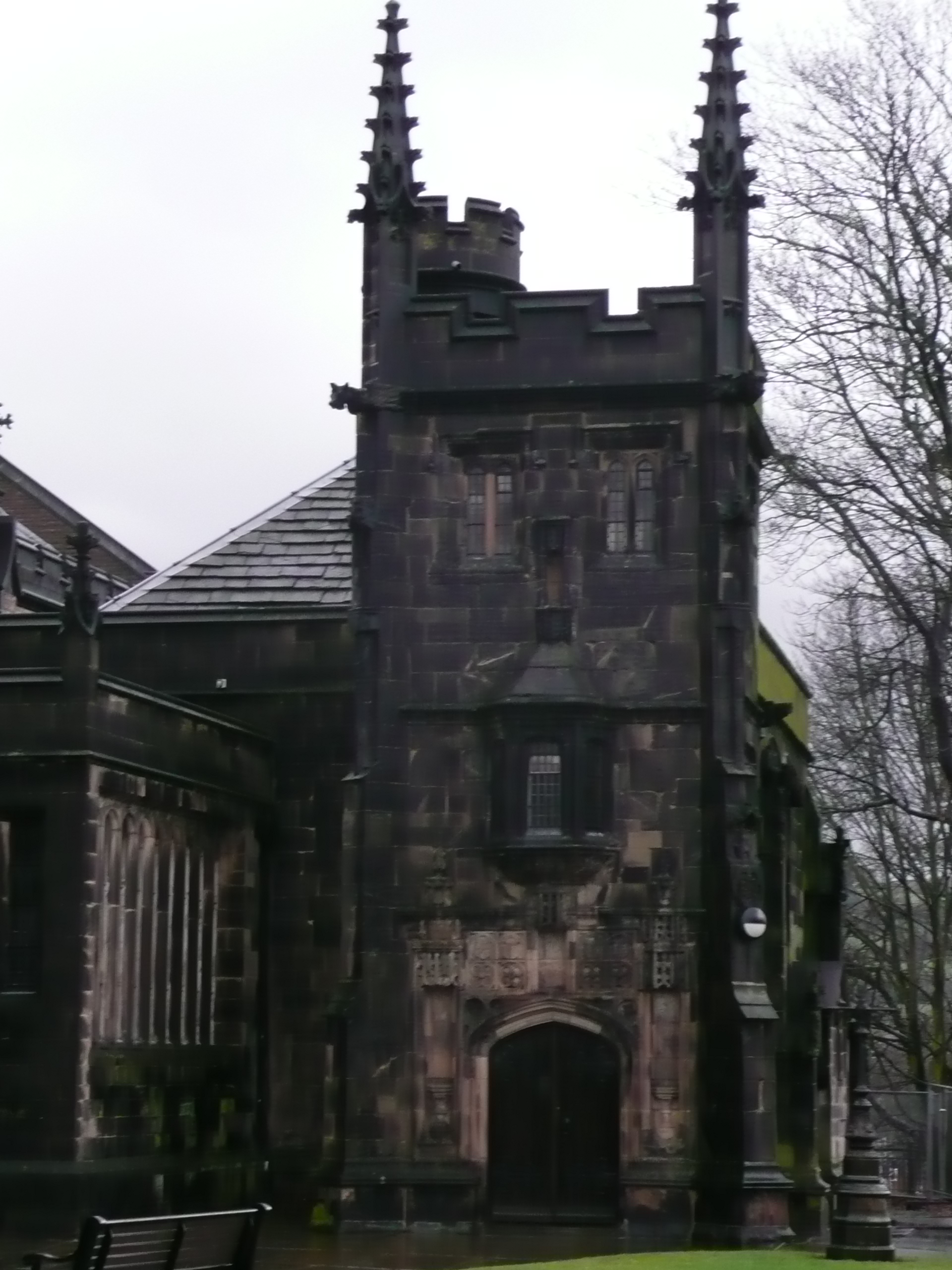
The exterior of the Savage Chapel

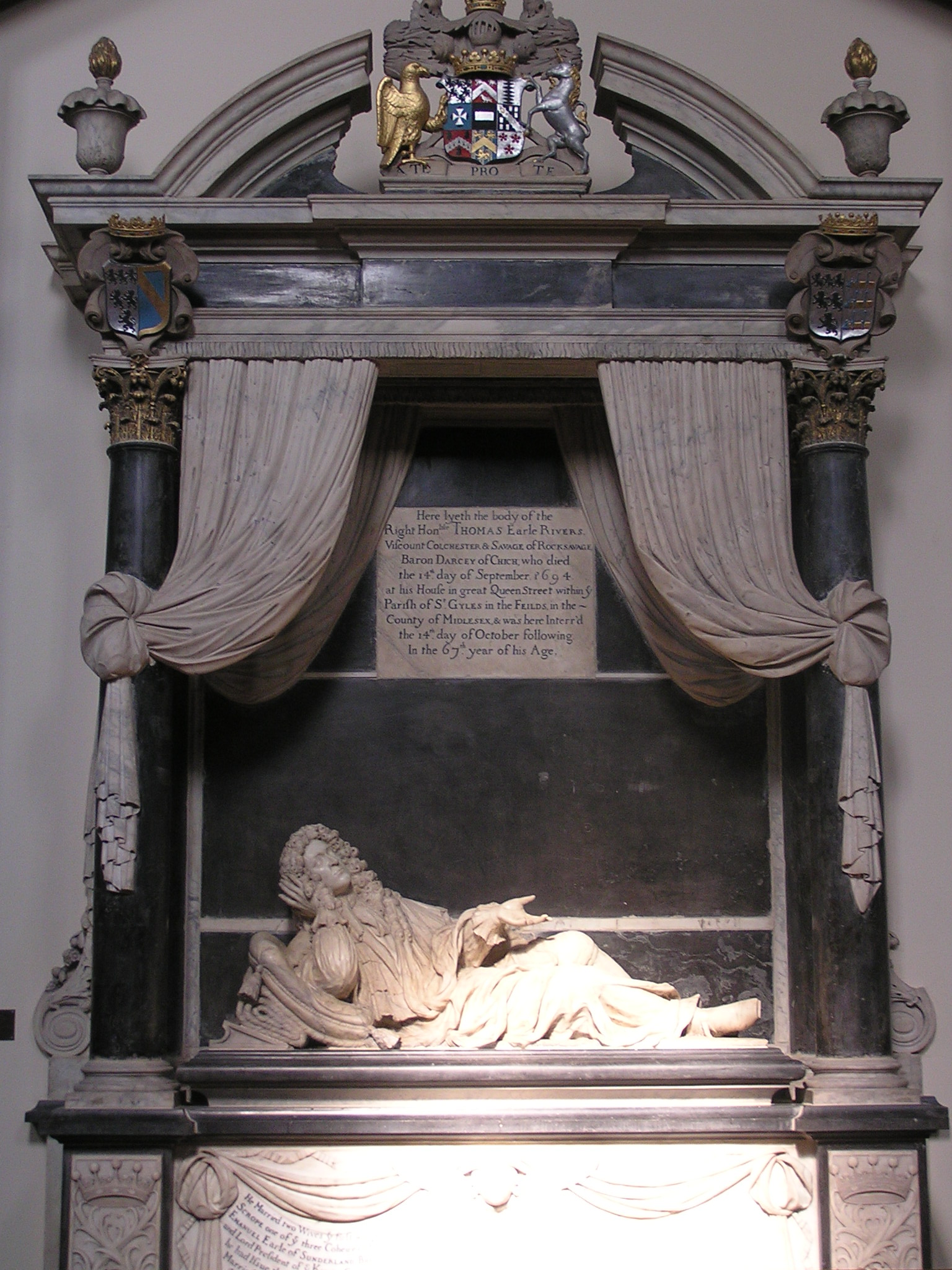
Tomb of Major General Thomas Savage, 3rd Earl Rivers in the Savage chapel

The Savage Chapel is the larger of the two family chapels at St Michael's, it was built between 1505 and 1507 by Archbishop Thomas Savage, a member of the family who served as Archbishop of York. Many members of the Savage family are buried in tombs within the chapel.

In the Savage Chapel is the Pardon Brass in memory of Roger Legh who died in 1506. This was in three parts, one showing Roger kneeling with his six sons, and one showing the Mass of Saint Gregory; the other part, which is missing, is thought to have shown Roger's wife with their seven daughters. Its inscription shows that for five Paternosters, five Aves and one Creed, an indulgence will be given for 26,000 years and 26 days in purgatory.

Many of the tombs and memorials represent members of the Savage family and a high proportion of these have the forename of John. The tomb of Sir John Savage who died in 1597 and his wife, Lady Elizabeth Manners, are in the Savage Chapel. On the tomb are their recumbent effigies with Elizabeth, who was the daughter of the Earl of Rutland, at a higher level to reflect her superior rank. Above them is a canopy on which are two female figures. It was this John Savage who built the great mansion of Rocksavage near Runcorn. To the south of this tomb is a white alabaster tombstone which is thought to be in memory of George Savage, chancellor of the diocese of Chester who died in 1552. Also in the chapel is the effigy of a civilian, showing the head and shoulders and the feet, the centre being left as plain masonry. In the southeast corner of the chapel is the tomb of Sir John Savage who died in 1528 and his wife, Elizabeth, daughter of Charles Somerset, 1st Earl of Worcester.

In the apse of the chapel are a damaged piscina and aumbry, and a squint giving a view of the main altar. The altar in the chapel is the original one in stone. In the north wall of the chapel, between the chapel and the nave of the church, are two more tombs with effigies. One is Sir John Savage, the elder brother of Archbishop Savage. He had been a commander at the Battle of Bosworth Field in 1485 and was killed at a Siege of Boulogne (1492). The other is the tomb of his son, John Savage, who died in 1527 and who was Sheriff of Worcestershire for 24 years.

On the south side of the sanctuary is the tomb of Sir John Savage, who died in 1495, and his wife Katherine, daughter of Thomas Stanley, 1st Baron Stanley. This is considered to be the finest tomb in the church and contains recumbent alabaster effigies of the couple. On the south side of the sanctuary is another fine alabaster monument of a knight in armour which is known as the Downes effigy. This is thought to represent one of the Downes of Shrigley. In the chancel is the tomb of Thomas Savage, 3rd Earl Rivers, who died in 1694 (the memorial was moved from the south aisle in the 2003-4 reordering). He is depicted in a robe with a wig, semi-reclining under a marble canopy which is supported by Corinthian columns.

== External features ==
In the churchyard is a sundial dating probably from the 18th century. It consists of a baluster-pedestal on a stone base. It is listed at Grade II. Also listed at Grade II are the churchyard walls, railings, gates and gate piers.

== See also ==
- Grade II* listed buildings in Cheshire East
- Listed buildings in Macclesfield
