= Thomas Savage (bishop) =

Archbishop of York from 1501 to 1507

The Most Reverend and Right Honourable Thomas Savage DCanL, LL.D.
- Archbishop of York and Primate of England
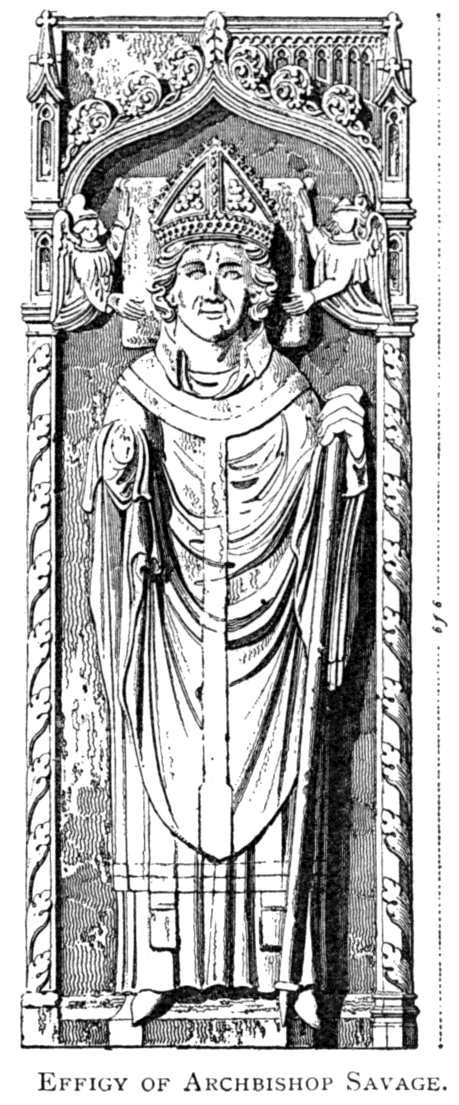
- Drawing of an effigy of Archbishop Thomas Savage in York Minster
- Appointed: 18 January 1501
- Installed: Never enthroned
- Term ended: 3 September 1507
- Predecessor: Thomas Rotherham
- Successor: Christopher Bainbridge
- Other posts: Bishop of Rochester; Bishop of London

Orders
- Ordination: 1470
- Consecration: 28 April 1493

Personal details
- Born: 1449 Clifton Hall, Cheshire
- Died: 3 September 1507 (aged 57–58) Cawood Castle, Yorkshire
- Buried: York Minster
- Denomination: Roman Catholic
- Residence: Cawood Castle, Yorkshire
- Parents: Sir John Savage (1422–95) (f); Lady Katherine Stanley (m).
- Education: University of Oxford (MA), University of Bologna (studies in divinity), University of Padua (Doctor of Canon Law), University of Cambridge (Doctor of both laws LL.D.)

Styles of Thomas Savage
- Reference style: The Most Reverend
- Spoken style: Your Grace
- Religious style: Archbishop

Thomas Savage (1449 in Clifton, Cheshire – 3 September 1507, in Cawood, Yorkshire) was a prelate, diplomat and scholar during the Tudor period. Savage served as Chaplain to King Henry VII and was Archbishop of York from 1501 until his death in 1507. Prior to his consecration as a Bishop, Savage served as a diplomat and rector (Savage continued to carry out diplomatic duties whilst he was a Bishop). As a diplomat Savage held the positions of English Ambassador to Castile and Portugal, during which time he helped broker the marriage treaty between Arthur, Prince of Wales and Catherine of Aragon in 1489, and later held the position of English Ambassador to France from 1490, where he took part in the conference at Boulogne.

== Family and studies ==
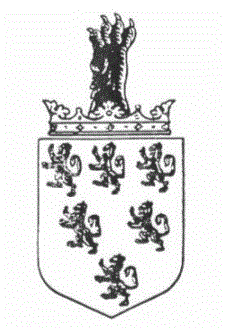
Coat of Arms of the Savage family

Born a member of the Savage family, Thomas was the second son of the many children of Sir John Savage (1422–1495) and Lady Catherine née Stanley, daughter of Lord Stanley, the knight and military commander Sir John Savage, KG, was his elder brother. Among his other siblings were the knights Sir Edward, Sir Richard, Sir Christopher and Sir Humphrey Savage. His sisters married into county families, including the Booths, Duttons and Leighs. Through Savage marriages with the various Cheshire county families, he was related to Archbishop Lawrence Booth. Among his other close relatives were his uncles Thomas Stanley (who was created Earl of Derby after Bosworth in 1485) and Sir William Stanley and his cousin George Stanley, 9th Baron Strange.

After graduating from Oxford University, proceeding Master of Arts c. 1473, Savage was sent abroad to further his studies in divinity, first at Bologna and then, in 1477, at the University of Padua, receiving a doctorate of Canon Law before serving there as Jurist Rector (1481–82). He was awarded the degree of LLD (Cantab) in 1495.

== Career ==
Thomas Savage early ecclesiastical career entailed appointments to several rectorships. Savage was first appointed Rector of Davenham, Cheshire in 1470, before successively becoming; Rector of Jacobstow, Devon in 1474, Rector of Monks Risborough, Buckinghamshire in 1484; and Rector of Rostherne, Cheshire in 1485. Such advowsons provided him with a source of income while he pursued his academic studies abroad.

Savage benefited greatly from Henry VII's ascension to the throne. Savage's brother Sir John Savage had been one Henry's main commanders at the Battle of Bosworth Field (the battle which had put Henry on the throne) and the Savage family enjoyed newfound prominence and privileges after victory was achieved on the field of battle. Previously only a rector and scholar Savage now received appointments to several positions of power and prestige; first receiving important diplomatic appointments as English ambassador to Castile and Portugal in 1488 during which time he helped broker the marriage treaty between Arthur, Prince of Wales and Catherine of Aragon in 1489, and then later as Ambassador to France in 1490, where he took part in the conference at Boulogne (where Sir John would be killed whilst besieging the city in 1492). Before beginning a career as a high ranking cleric (prelate), being nominated to the position of Bishop of Rochester in 1492 (consecrated on 28 April 1493) serving until 1496 when he became Bishop of London and Chaplain to King Henry. During this time the Bishop continued his diplomatic duties, negotiating a trade treaty between England and Riga in 1498. Before finally becoming Archbishop of York and Primate of England in 1501 a position which he held until his death in 1507. Both Sir John and Dr Thomas became part of the King's inner circle, of 11 known meetings of the King's council in the months June–July 1486, one or both of the brothers were present at 8.

Savage served as President of the council attendant on the King and Chaplain to Henry VII, before being appointed as Archbishop of York on 18 January 1501. While Archbishop he played a part in the marriage ceremony of Arthur, Prince of Wales, to Catherine of Aragon. Prince Arthur died young, and his brother Henry, who became Henry VIII, then married Princess Catherine. Archbishop Savage had earlier led the ceremony by which Henry was made Duke of York.

"A Lancastrian in politics, he was much trusted and employed by Henry VII....he was a courtier by nature, and took part in the great ceremonies of his time, the creation of Prince Henry as Duke of York, the meeting with the Archduke Philip, and the reception of Catherine of Aragon."

The now Archbishop Thomas Savage became one of the most important men in the north of England, exercising a great deal of power as the king's commissioner and leader of the King's Council of the North. As a result of the great power he wielded over the years of his tenure as Archbishop of York, he formed a rivalry with Henry Percy, 4th Earl of Northumberland, one of the most powerful noblemen in the north of England. Northumberland had wanted several of the positions on the council to go to his supporters but was unable to secure these positions, he had also frequently clashed with two of the Archbishop's household officers Sir John Hotham and Sir Robert Constable. Tensions between the Archbishop and Lord Northumberland mounted as a result of several clashes between their associates, and reached a head on 23 May 1504. That day Lord Northumberland left Fulford (a small town just outside York) with an escort of 13 armed riders. Archbishop Savage had passed that way not long before with an escort of 80 armed riders. Throughout that day the two parties had encountered each other on multiple occasions in York, and each time there had been provocation from members of both parties. On the road out of Fulford Northumberland and his men encountered a dozen of the Archbishop's men who had hung back from his main party. Two of these men deliberately rode between the Earl and his men causing the Earl's horse to stumble and fall to its knees. The Earl exclaimed 'Is there no way sirs but over me?' before striking one of the men in the face. Swords were drawn by members of both groups and some blows were exchanged. The main body of the Archbishop's force now aware of the commotion rode back to the scene of the altercation, The Archbishop's men aimed crossbows at the Earl and his men and insults were exchanged between both parties. One almost fired his weapon but another of the Archbishop's party cut the bow before he could do so, and thus full-scale fighting was avoided. Both the Archbishop and the Earl were apprehensive about what response awaited them from the King. The two men and their retainers were summoned to London by the King where they were questioned by a panel of counsellors. The Archbishop claimed that the entire situation was entirely down to the actions of Lord Northumberland, despite this King handed the two equal punishment, forcing them to enter bonds for £2000. The King was greatly displeased by the situation and the Archbishop's career faltered after this point, declining slowly but steadily until his death three years later.

== Death and legacy ==
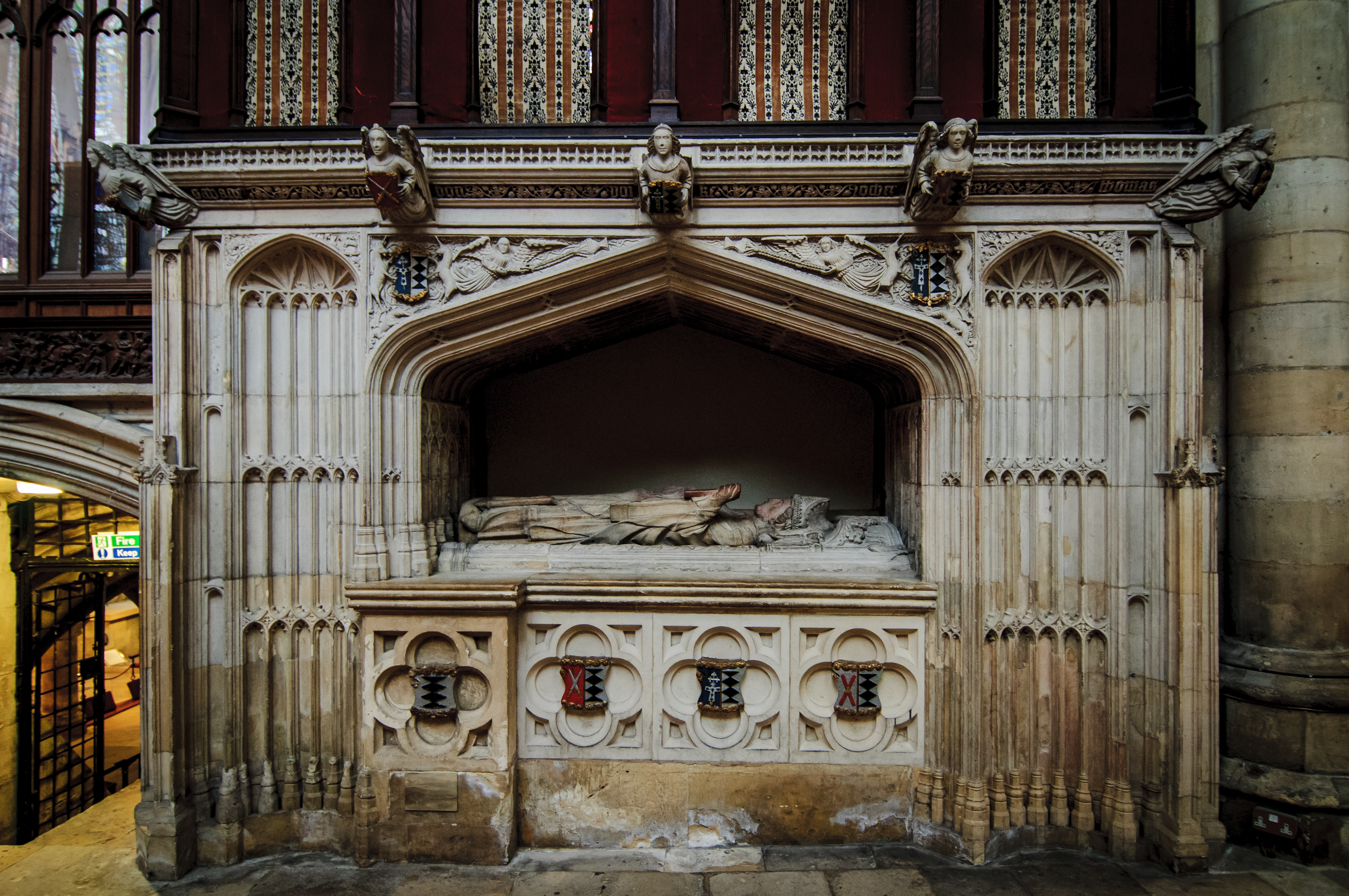
Tomb of Archbishop Thomas Savage in York Minster

Archbishop Thomas Savage died at Cawood Castle, the residence of the Archbishops of York, on 3 September 1507. He was succeeded as Archbishop by Christopher Bainbridge. Archbishop Savage's body is buried at York Minster where his effigy and tomb remain. His heart was later interred in the Savage Chapel at Macclesfield Church, Cheshire.

Despite having had a key role in many of the notable events of his time (the brokering of the marriage treaty between Arthur, Prince of Wales and Catherine of Aragon, the creation of Prince Henry as Duke of York, the meeting with the Archduke Philip, and the reception of Catherine of Aragon and Prince Arthur) and being a much trusted employee of Henry VII (serving him as President of his council and his personal chaplain, as well as ambassador to several European powers), the Archbishop's legacy is slightly tarnished by allegations that he maintained a lifestyle too akin to that of a nobleman rather than that of a priest. Described as a 'flamboyant, worldly sophisticate, a keen hunter and a keeper of peacocks, with an unholy penchant for taking the lord's name in vain' he was also accused of nepotism, exploiting his position to gain benefits for his friends and family.

== Bibliography ==
- Arnold, Morris; Green, Thomas A.; Scully, Sally A.; White, Stephen D., eds. (1976). . On the Laws and Customs of England: Essays in Honor of Samuel E. Thorne (1st ed.). Chapel Hill: University of North Carolina Press. ISBN 0807878146.
- Crossley, Fred. H. (1924). Mediaeval monumental effigies remaining in Cheshire. A&C Black.
- Harriss, G. L.; Archer, Rowena E.; Walker, Simon, eds. (1995). Rulers and Ruled in Late Medieval England. A&C Black. ISBN 9781852851330.
- Jones, B. (ed.). Archbishops of York". Fasti Ecclesiae Anglicanae 1300-1541: Volume 6, Northern Province (York, Carlisle and Durham). Institute of Historical Research – via British History Online.
- Lee, Sidney (ed.). "Savage, Thomas (d.1507)". Dictionary of National Biography. London: Smith, Elder & Co.
- Penn, Thomas (2012). Winter King: Henry VII and the Dawn of Tudor England. Simon & Schuster. ISBN 978-1439191569.
- Pryde, E. B.; Greenway, D. E.; Porter, S.; Roy, I. (1996). Handbook of British Chronology (Third revised ed.). Cambridge: Cambridge University Press. ISBN 0-521-56350-X.
- Richardson, Douglas (2007). Magna Carta Ancestry, Baltimore. Baltimore, Md. ISBN 978-0806317595.
- Smith, F.W.; Watson, Gemma, L (2015). Writing the Lives of People and Things, AD 500-1700. Abingdon-on-Thames: Routledge. ISBN 9781472450678.
- Rylands, John Paul, ed. (1882). The Visitation of Cheshire 1580 by several heralds. London.
- Woolfson, Jonathan (1998). Padua and the Tudors: English Students in Italy, 1485-1603. Toronto: University of Toronto Press. ISBN 0802009468.

Catholic Church titles
Preceded by Edmund Audley	Bishop of Rochester; 1493–1497	Succeeded by Richard FitzJames
Preceded by Richard Hill	Bishop of London; 1497–1501	Succeeded by William Warham
Preceded by Thomas Rotherham	Archbishop of York; 1501–1507	Succeeded by Christopher Bainbridge
