= Blatherwick =

Blatherwick is a surname. Notable people with the surname include:

- David Blatherwick (artist) (born 1960), Canadian painter and video artist
- David Blatherwick (diplomat) (born 1941), British diplomat
- Francis John Blatherwick (born 1944), Canadian medical health officer
- Jack Blatherwick (born 1998), English cricketer
- Jennifer Blatherwick, Canadian politician
- Lily Blatherwick (1854–1934), English painter
- Steve Blatherwick (born 1973), English footballer
- Thomas Blatherwick, English rugby player
- Wilfred Blatherwick (1870–1956), American tennis player

== See also ==
- Hugill & Blatherwick, architectural firm in Sioux Falls, South Dakota
- Blatherwycke, village in Northamptonshire, England
- Bathwick
