= Ballad of Bosworth Field =

Poem

The Ballad of Bosworth Field is a poem in the English language, believed to have been written before 1495; the earliest extant copy dates from the mid-17th century. The poem is thought to have been written by someone closely connected with the Stanley family, because of the way it praises the Stanley brothers for their role in the Battle of Bosworth Field in 1485.

The ballad gives primary source information about certain aspects of the battle, such as the names of four knights supposedly lent to the future King Henry VII of England by Lord Stanley to serve as his bodyguard. These were Sir Robert Tunstall, Sir John Savage (nephew of Lord Stanley), Sir Hugh Persall and Sir Humphrey Stanley. Sir John Savage was placed in command of the left flank of Henry's army.
