= Savage family (Ireland) =

The Savage family in Ireland are descended from members of the Anglo-Norman Savage family, who landed in Ulster and settled in the barony of Ards, County Down in the latter half of the 12th century during the conquest of Ulster by Sir John de Courcy.

Sir William Savage, Baron Savage accompanied Sir John de Courcy during the conquest of Ulster in 1177 and the family went on to build a number of castles and priories in The Ards.

== See also ==
- Savage (surname)
