= Thomas Savage, 3rd Earl Rivers =

English nobleman and soldier

Major General The Right Honorable The Earl Rivers
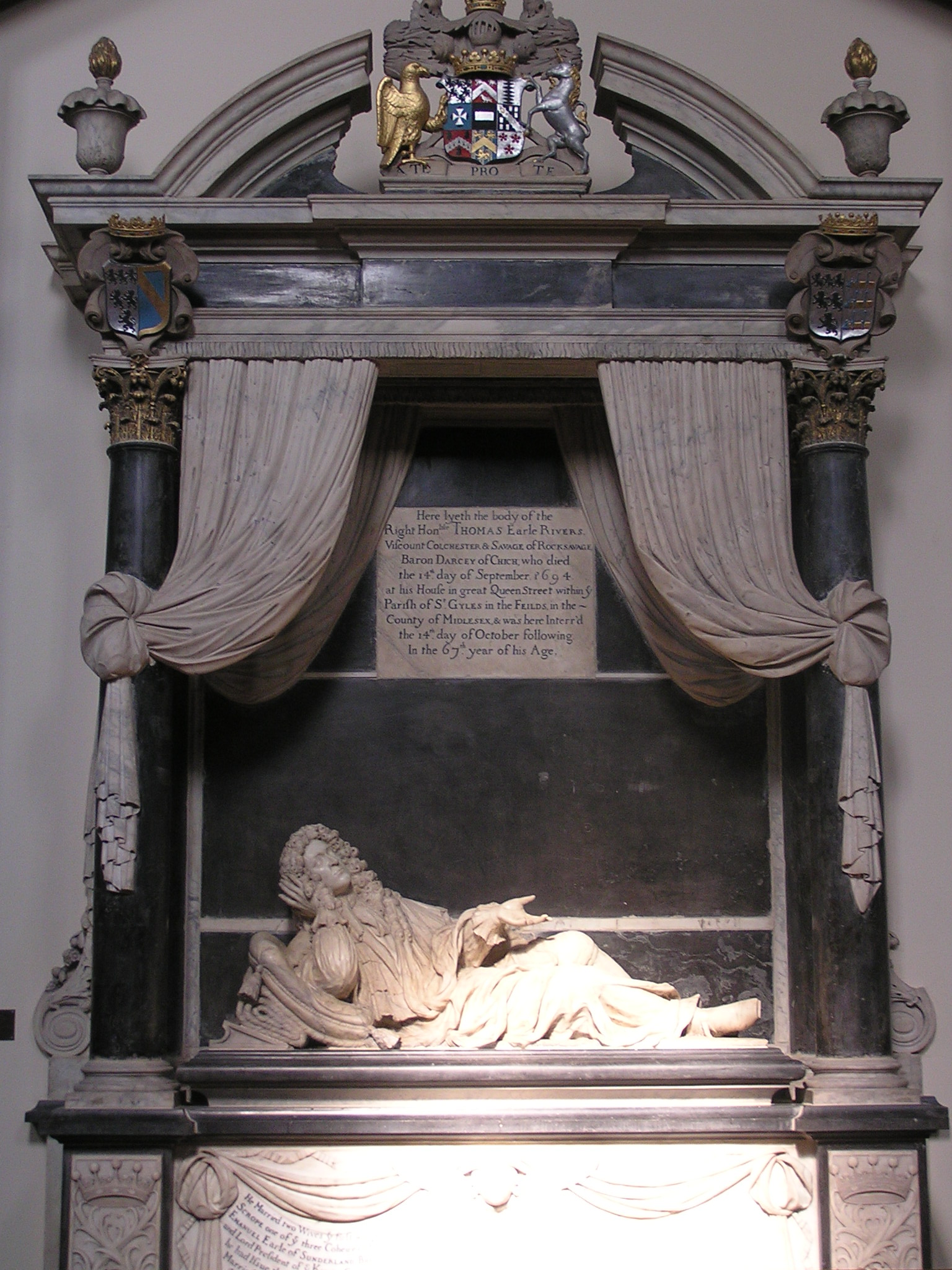
- Tomb of Thomas Savage, 3rd Earl Rivers

- Coat of arms
- Born: Thomas Savage c. 1628; Cheshire, England
- Died: 14 September 1694 (aged 65–66); Great Queen Street, Parish of St Giles in the Fields, Middlesex
- Residence: House on Great Queen Street, Rocksavage
- Noble family: Savage family
- Spouses: Elizabeth Scrope; Lady Arabella Bertie
- Issue: Hon. Thomas Savage; Richard Savage, 4th Earl Rivers; Lady Elizabeth Savage; Lady Annabella Savage
- Parents: John Savage, 2nd Earl Rivers; Hon. Catherine Parker

Major General Thomas Savage, 3rd Earl Rivers (c. 1628 – 14 September 1694) was an English nobleman and soldier.

He was the first son of John Savage, 2nd Earl Rivers by his wife Catherine, daughter of William Parker, 13th Baron Morley. His father was closely involved in the English Civil War on the Royalist side from 1641. Consequently, he lost his castles at Halton and Rocksavage and their contents were confiscated.

About 1647, he married firstly Elizabeth (b. 1627), illegitimate daughter of Emanuel Scrope, 1st Earl of Sunderland by his mistress Martha Jeanes. Their children included: Thomas, who married Charlotte, daughter of Charles Stanley, 8th Earl of Derby; Richard, who succeeded as 4th Earl Rivers; Elizabeth; and Annabella. They also had other children who died young.

He was widely believed to be a Roman Catholic, and during the Popish Plot he was denounced by informers, but the evidence was so flimsy that no charges were ever brought against him.

About 1684, he married secondly Arabella, daughter of Robert Bertie, 3rd Earl of Lindsey. They had no issue.

He died at his house in Great Queen Street in the Parish of St Giles in the Fields, Middlesex. A memorial to him by William Stanton was installed in St Michael's Church, Macclesfield.

Documented evidence exists in the form of a pamphlet which details a murder by a Thomas Savage of St Giles in the Fields. It is likely the Thomas in question is the son of the 3rd Earl Rivers, or a family relation.

Peerage of England
Preceded by John Savage	Earl Rivers; 1654–1694	Succeeded by Richard Savage
