= John Savage, 2nd Earl Rivers =

English nobleman, politician and Royalist

The Right Honourable The Earl Rivers Kt.
- Coat of arms
- Born: John Savage; 25 February 1603; London
- Died: 10 October 1654 (aged 51); Frodsham Castle, Frodsham, Cheshire
- Buried: St Michael and All Angels' Church, Macclesfield; 53.2603°N 2.1244°W
- Residence: Rocksavage, Halton Castle, Frodsham Castle
- Noble family: Savage family
- Spouses: Lady Catherine Parker; Mary Ogle
- Issue: with Catherine: Thomas Savage, 3rd Earl Rivers; Lady Jane Savage; John Savage b. 1630; Elizabeth, Baroness Petre; Catherine, Lady Sedley; Lady Mary Killigrew with Mary: Hon. Peter Savage
- Parents: Thomas Savage, 1st Viscount Savage; Elizabeth Savage, Countess Rivers
- Occupation: Member of Parliament for Cheshire from 1624-25, Steward of Halton Castle, Patron of the Earl Rivers Regiment of Foote

John Savage, 2nd Earl Rivers (25 February 1603 – 10 October 1654) was a wealthy English nobleman, politician and Royalist from Cheshire.

Arms of Savage: Argent, six lions rampant, sable

== Family ==
A member of the Savage family, John was the first son of Thomas Savage, 1st Viscount Savage, and Elizabeth, daughter of Thomas Darcy, 1st Earl Rivers. He was born on 25 February 1603 and christened on 11 March 1603 in the parish of Saint Botolph without Bishopsgate, London. He succeeded to the Savage viscountcy in 1635 on the death of his father, and succeeded to the Rivers earldom on the death of his grandfather in 1640, by a remainder to his father and his heirs.

By 1626, he had married Catherine, daughter of William Parker, 13th Baron Morley by his wife Elizabeth, daughter of Sir Thomas Tresham, and they had eight children, including:

- Thomas, who succeeded as 3rd Earl Rivers
- John Savage, who immigrated to America
- Jane, who married firstly George Brydges, 6th Baron Chandos, secondly Sir William Sidley, 4th Baronet, and thirdly George Pitt
- Elizabeth, who married William Petre, 4th Baron Petre
- Catherine, who married Sir Charles Sedley, 5th Baronet
- Mary, who married Henry Killigrew, groom of the bedchamber to James II, son of Thomas Killigrew.

By 1647, he had married Mary, daughter of Thomas Ogle, and they had one child, Peter.

== Life ==
He was from a Catholic family; he and his family owned land in Ireland and England. Oxford educated, he went into politics and became Member of Parliament for Cheshire. He was knighted on 7 August 1624. The Savage family were lords of the manor of Frodsham. His coat of arms, argent, six Lions rampant, sable, 3.2. and 1. Savage. The family crest was a lion's jambe, erect out of a ducal coronet, or.

Earl Rivers, as Steward of Halton, lived at Halton Castle, near Runcorn. His other properties included the manor house of Rocksavage at Clifton near Runcorn, which was passed down through his family. Rocksavage was similar in appearance to Brereton Hall, which was built about the same time.

In 1639/40 Rivers was appointed on to a committee investigating complaints against Charles I. During 1641 his allegiance swung back to Charles, and in 1642 he was given the King's commission of Array to raise a Regiment of Foot in Cheshire. Savage raised most of his troops in Cheshire and some in Kent. It was a large and well-equipped force, well-trained and with experienced officers who had seen service in Europe and Ireland. The Earl Rivers Regiment of Foote was present on the day the King raised his standard in Nottingham, and they served in major battles thereafter.

When Rivers returned to Cheshire he placed Halton Castle under the command of Captain Walter Primrose, and fortified it. The castle fell to two parliamentary sieges, the first led by Sir William Brereton in 1643. The Parliamentarians held the castle for a while but then, hearing of the approach of superior Royalist forces led by Prince Rupert, they abandoned it. The Royalists in turn withdrew from Halton and the Parliamentarians occupied the castle once again. With Halton Castle under Parliamentary control, and with Rocksavage now in ruins, Earl Rivers retired to Frodsham Castle, and took no other part in the Civil War. There he died on 10 October 1654. A few hours after his death, with his body lying within, the castle was set on fire and burned down. It was completely destroyed. The body was rescued, later to be buried privately two days later in Macclesfield.

== Notes ==
Parliament of England
Preceded by Edward Whitby; John Ratcliffe	Member of Parliament for Chester; 1624–1626; With: Edward Whitby	Succeeded by Edward Whitby; William Gamull
Peerage of England
Preceded by Thomas Darcy	Earl Rivers; 1640–1654	Succeeded by Thomas Savage
Preceded by Thomas Savage	Viscount Savage; 1635–1654	Succeeded by Thomas Savage
