= Humphrey Stafford (died 1486) =

English nobleman

Sir Humphrey Stafford (c. 1427 – 8 July 1486) of Grafton Manor in Worcestershire, was an English nobleman who took part in the War of the Roses on the Yorkist side. He was executed by Henry VII following his fighting for Richard III and his role in the Stafford and Lovell rebellion.

== Origins ==
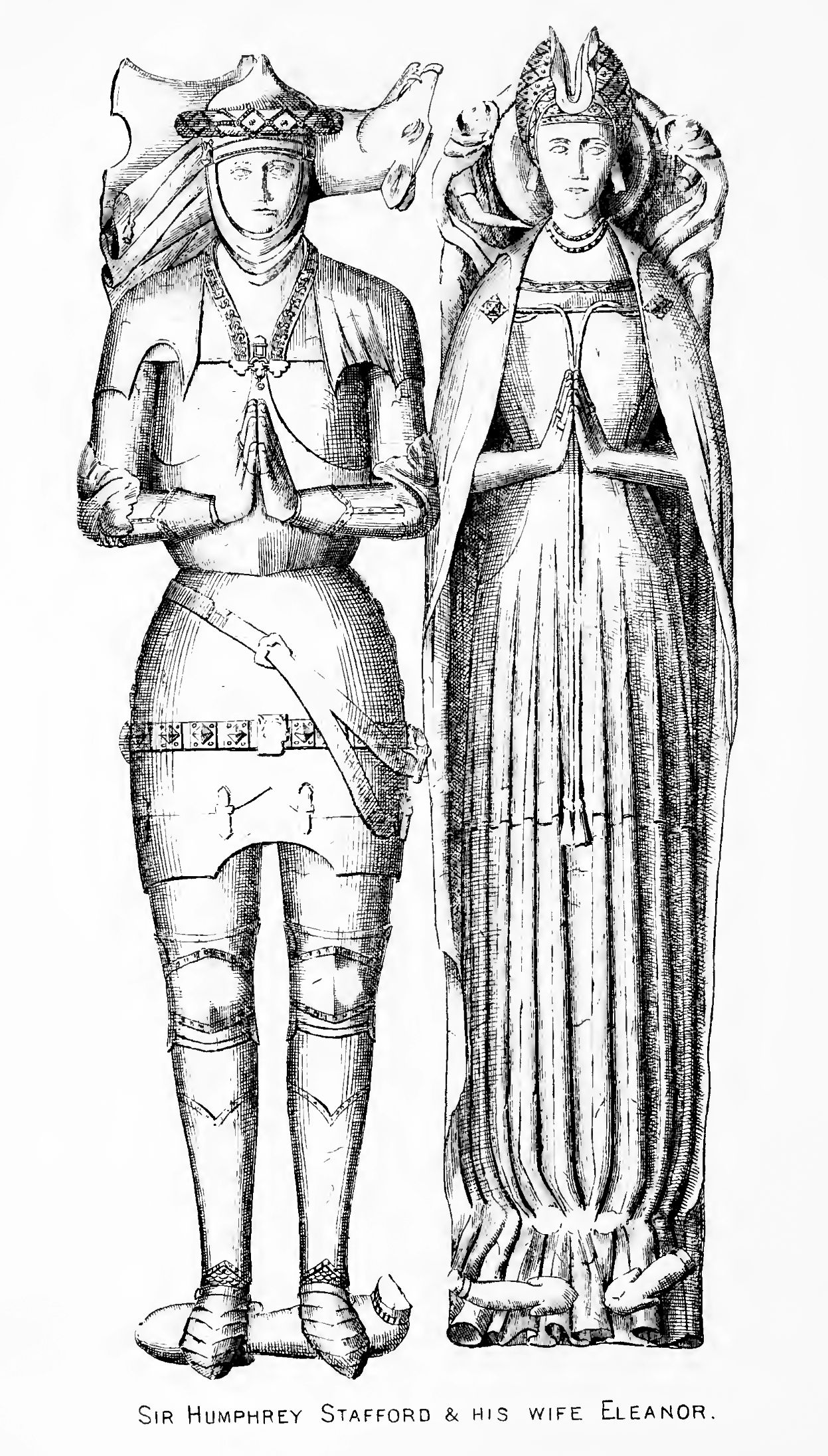
Effigies to Stafford's parents, Sir Humphrey (died 1450) and Eleanor – in the church of St John, Bromsgrove

Humphrey Stafford was born in about 1427 in Grafton, Worcestershire, the son of Sir Humphrey Stafford (1400–1450) who was slain in 1450 in Jack Cade's Rebellion.

== Career ==
Humphrey Stafford inherited Grafton and Upton Warren in 1449–50. He fought at the Battle of Bosworth with Richard III.

=== Stafford and Lovell rebellion ===
Sir Humphrey Stafford and his brother Thomas Stafford, joined by Francis Lovell, 1st Viscount Lovell, led the inauspicious Stafford and Lovell Rebellion in 1486. After a Yorkist defeat at The Battle of Bosworth, Sir Humphrey Stafford, with Thomas Stafford and Lord Lovell, sought sanctuary together at Colchester where they planned the rebellion.

The conspirators hoped to restore the Yorkist monarchy. While Lord Lovell went to Yorkshire, the Stafford brothers went to the Midlands. On 23 April 1486, after a failed attempt to seize Henry VII in York, Lord Lovell escaped to Burgundy. In the meantime, the Stafford brothers' rebellion in Worcester had failed, in part due to lack of proper planning and in part because King Henry had some support in that area. After a period of uncertainty caused by the War of the Roses, there was a general consensus for peace among English people, meaning few supported the idea of a rebellion. Furthermore, rumours surrounding Richard III after the alleged murders of Edward V, and his brother Richard of Shrewsbury, Duke of York meant a lack of support for Richard III loyalists.

During this time King Henry was on a nationwide tour of the country. As soon as he advanced towards Worcester in order to eliminate Yorkist support, on 11 May 1486 the Stafford brothers fled to sanctuary at Culham.

Despite the fact that Stafford had sought sanctuary, he was forcibly removed from his sanctuary on the night of 13 May on charges of treason by the knight Sir John Savage and sixty armed men. Henry then ordered Humphrey's execution, but pardoned the younger Thomas.

The arrest prompted a series of protests to Pope Innocent VIII over the breaking of sanctuary; these resulted in a Papal bull in August which severely limited the rights of sanctuary, excluding it completely in cases of treason, thereby vindicating the King's actions.

Humphrey was executed at Tyburn on 8 July 1486.

== Marriage and family ==
Humphrey Stafford married Catherine Fray (1437–1482), the daughter of Sir John Fray, Chief Baron of the Exchequer, in Grafton. They had eight children:

1. Anne Stafford, married Richard Neville, 2nd Baron Latimer
2. Joyce Stafford
3. Margarita Stafford (1456–1530)
4. Elizabeth Stafford (b. circa 1465)
5. William Stafford (d. 1556)
6. Thomas Stafford (b. circa 1450)
7. Henry Stafford (b. 1455)
8. Humphrey Stafford (died 1545) of Blatherwick, Northamptonshire, married Margaret Fogge, of daughter John Fogge

== Sources ==
- Williams, C.H. (April 1928). "The Rebellion of Humphrey Stafford in 1486". English Historical Review. 43 (170). Oxford University Press: 181–9. doi:10.1093/ehr/xliii.clxx.181. JSTOR 552001.
