= Stafford and Lovell rebellion =

First armed uprising against King Henry VII (1486)

- Part of the Wars of the Roses
Date	23 April – 14 May 1486
Location	Yorkshire, England
Result	Tudor victory

Belligerents
House of Tudor (Lancastrian)	House of York

Commanders and leaders
Henry VII; Duke of Bedford; Sir Richard Edgcumbe; Sir John Savage	Viscount Lovell; Sir Humphrey Stafford; Thomas Stafford

The Stafford and Lovell rebellion was the first armed uprising against King Henry VII after he won the crown at the Battle of Bosworth in 1485. The uprising was led by Francis Lovell, Viscount Lovell, along with Sir Humphrey Stafford and Thomas Stafford, brothers from Grafton, Worcestershire. The uprising occurred during Eastertime 1486.

== Rebellion ==
After the Battle of Bosworth in 1485, Francis Lord Lovell and Humphrey Stafford sought sanctuary at Colchester Abbey. The conspirators hoped to restore the Yorkist monarchy.

Henry VII used spies to monitor the activities of known Yorkist supporters. Sometime in April 1486, King Henry learned that Lovell and Humphrey Stafford had escaped and were planning a rebellion. Sir Richard Edgcumbe and Sir William Tyler were appointed by the King to apprehend Lovell. With the failure of the plot, Lovell first joined fellow rebels at Furness Falls and later fled to Margaret of Burgundy in Flanders. In the meantime, the Stafford brothers had risen in rebellion in Worcester, despite the fact that King Henry had mass support in that area.

During this time, Henry was in York on a nationwide tour of the country. It is believed that the king's issue of a pardon was 'effective' in leading to many rebels choosing to disperse. In the 1500s, historian Polydore Vergil wrote how the rebels 'without delay cast themselves at Bedford's [Jasper Tudor] feet, begged for pardon, and surrendered themselves to the Crown'. As soon as he advanced towards Worcester in order to eliminate Yorkist support, on 11 May 1486, the Stafford brothers again fled to sanctuary, this time at Culham in the church belonging to Abingdon Abbey.

== Conclusion of the rebellion and its consequences ==
King Henry had the Staffords forcibly removed from the abbey on the night of 14 May by 60 armed men led by his knight Sir John Savage, who had commanded the left flank of his army at the Battle of Bosworth. When the abbot found out about what had happened, he sent a written complaint to the authorities about what he saw as an outrageous infringement of his abbey's ancient privileges as a place of sanctuary. However, the two men were tried before the Court of King's Bench, where the justices ruled that sanctuary was not applicable in cases of treason. Henry then ordered the execution of Sir Humphrey Stafford of Grafton but pardoned the younger Thomas Stafford.

The arrest prompted a series of protests against Pope Innocent VIII over the breaking of sanctuary; these resulted in a papal bull in August which agreed to some modifications affecting the privilege.

Sir John Conyers, who was suspected of being involved in the revolt, was stripped of his stewardship of Middleham and had a £2,000 bond imposed. The Abbot of Abingdon, who had organised sanctuary for the Stafford brothers, was given a 3000-mark bond of allegiance.

Henry had no wish to alienate Viscount Lovell and his family. On 5 July 1486, Lovell was appointed a justice of oyer and terminer, but later returned to England and again took up arms against the king, fighting what is considered to be the final battle of the Wars of the Roses when Yorkist and Lancastrian forces met at the Battle of Stoke Field on 16 June 1487. Sir John Savage was also again present on the day, as one of the main cavalry commanders of King Henry's forces. The battle was a decisive victory for Henry, with almost all the leading Yorkists killed, and never again would a battle be fought along Yorkist and Lancastrian lines. Lovell survived the defeat but then disappeared shortly after his escape, and was never seen again.
