= Sieges of Boulogne (1544–1546) =

Siege of the Rough Wooing and Italian War of 1542–1546

- Part of the Rough Wooing and Italian War of 1542–1546
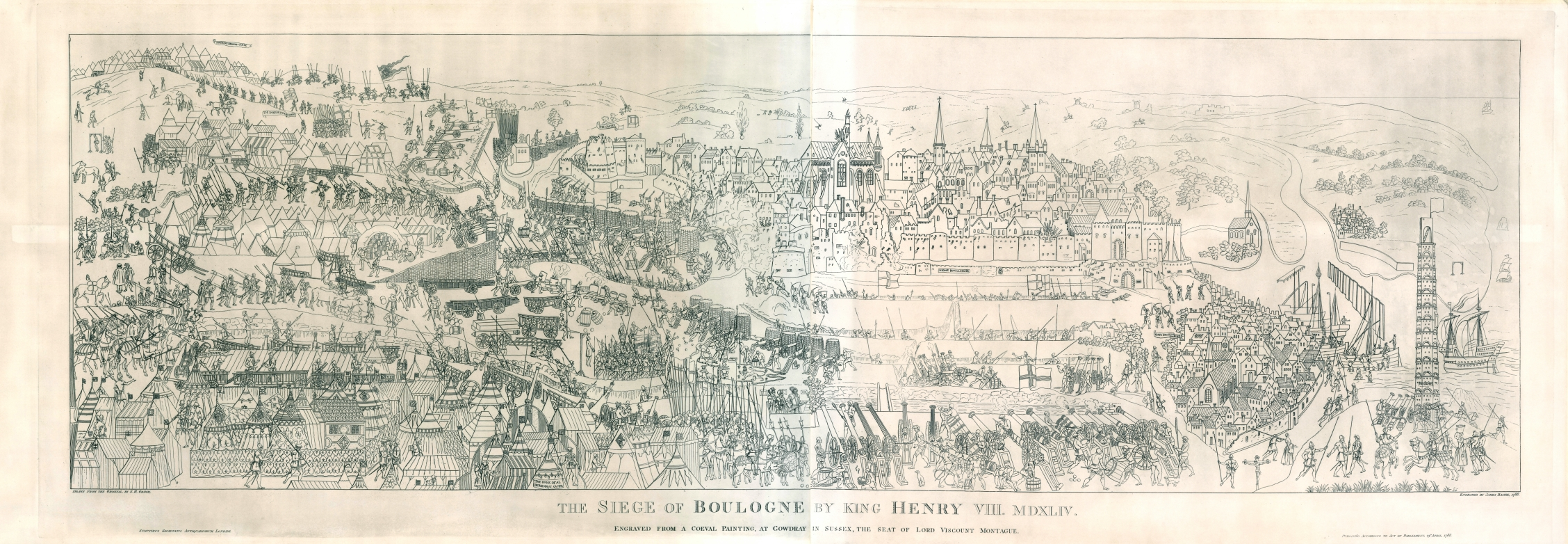
- Engraving of the siege
| Date | 19 July – 14 September 1544 (first siege); September 1544 – 16 May 1550 (second siege) |
| Location | Boulogne, France 50.7264°N 1.6147°E |
| Result | English victory |

Belligerents
| England | France |

Commanders and leaders
| First siege: Henry VIII; Duke of Suffolk; Second siege: Nicolas Arnold; Duke of Norfolk; Duke of Suffolk | First siege: Jacques de Coucy (fr) Second siege: Henry II of France; Gaspard II de Coligny |

Strength
| First siege: 40,000; Second siege: 4,000 | First siege: 2,000; Second siege: Unknown |

The sieges of Boulogne were two sieges which took place between England and France during the Rough Wooing and Italian War of 1542–1546. The first took place from 19 July to 14 September 1544 and the second from September 1544 to 16 May 1550. An earlier siege of Boulogne had taken place in 1492 when the English Tudor King Henry VII laid siege to the lightly defended lower town of Boulogne in the Pas-de-Calais, France. Fifty years later as allies of the Holy Roman Emperor Charles V, during the war against the French, the English returned led by Henry VII's son and heir, Henry VIII. Boulogne was fortified and defended as an English possession on the French mainland between 14 September 1544 and March 1550.

== First siege ==
The siege of Boulogne took place between 19 July and 14 September 1544, during the third invasion of France by King Henry VIII of England. Henry was motivated to take Boulogne by the French giving aid to England's enemies in Scotland. In 1543 he made a new alliance with Charles V, Holy Roman Emperor and King of Spain, whose Roman Catholic allegiances were, for a time, overruled by the political advantages of an alliance with England against France.

In early 1544, a large English force departed from the Pale of Calais. Later, this split into two parts, and one of them, under the Duke of Suffolk, marched to the coastal town of Boulogne and laid siege to it on 19 July. A few weeks later, Henry arrived to take command of the siege himself. The lower section of the town, fortified lightly, fell quickly to heavy bombardment, which continued through August. By September, the upper town was breached and taken, but the central castle still held out. The French garrison's firepower prevented any approach on foot, so the English dug tunnels under the castle, and the French surrendered on 13 September.

However, the Emperor Charles V then made a separate peace with France, and the French attacked Boulogne in the second siege of Boulogne.

Over the following years, neither England nor France found the strength to engage in all-out war with one another. French attempts to retake Boulogne failed, while English attempts to gain more territory around Calais and Boulogne also failed. Henry awaited a large French invasion fleet which never came, and subsequently much of England's military resources during his and his son's reigns were diverted to the war in Scotland.

== Second siege ==
The second siege of Boulogne was an engagement late in the Italian War of 1542–1546. The Dauphin's army descended on Montreuil, forcing the Duke of Norfolk to raise the siege; Henry VIII himself left for England at the end of September 1544, ordering the Dukes of Norfolk and Suffolk to defend Boulogne. The two Dukes quickly proceeded to disobey this order: leaving some 4,000 men to defend the captured city, they withdrew the rest of the English army to Calais. The English army, outnumbered, was now trapped in Calais; the Dauphin, left unopposed, concentrated his efforts on investing Boulogne. On 9 October, a French assault nearly captured the city, but was beaten back when the troops prematurely turned to looting.

== English armoury and the conclusion of the siege in 1550 ==
=== Fortifications ===
After Henry VIII's personal visit to Boulogne on 18 September the English began fortifying their position. Boulogne had a high and low town, and the citadel of Boulogne was in the low town adjacent to the harbour near the mouth of the river Liane. To the north a Roman lighthouse known as the Tour d'Ordre was fortified and called the 'Old Man', and a new fort built between the Old Man and Boulogne in 1545 was called the 'Young Man.'

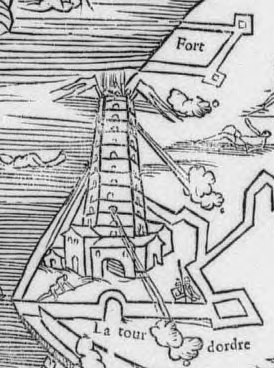
The Roman lighthouse known as the Tour d'Ordre in 1550, shown encircled by English fortifications.

The surveyor of these works was John Rogers who had been a master mason. The military engineer Richard Lee and Thomas Palmer, treasurer of Guînes, brought additional instructions directly from Henry VIII. Another outlying fort was built on a hill to the east from May 1546. Now called Mont Lambert, it was then called Boulemberg. However, Nicolas Arnold, the captain of Boulogne complained of its shortcomings; it held no well, or room for storage. It was abandoned in 1549 on the approach of a French army. The French fortified south of the Liane, building the Fort de Châtillon and Fort d'Outreau. The building of any new fortifications was supposed to have ceased under the Treaty of Camp (or Treaty of Ardres) made in June 1546. The treaty provided that the English would evacuate Boulogne in 1554 in return for 2,000,000 crowns. The English possession of Boulogne was eventually compromised by the French construction of a fort at Marquise, north of the town, which could blockade supplies. Although records are incomplete, it is clear that large numbers of English labourers died or became sick during the works. Of 1,200 men sent in January 1545, only 300 were still working in June.

=== Armoury ===
The guns of Boulogne were listed in the inventory of English crown possessions taken after Henry VIII's death on 28 January 1547. Most of their wheels and stocks were said to be rotten and decayed. The totals were; 4 cannons; 5 demi-cannons; 10 culverins; 14 demi-culverins; 18 sakers; 21 falcons, falconets, and chamber falcons; 25 great brass mortars; 19 small brass mortars; 9 iron mortars; 3 iron bombards; 3 iron cannon-perrier; 16 port-pieces; 24 fowlers; 7 slings; 12 double bases; 54 shrimp bases; 114 privy bases; 2 robinets; and 73 brass hagbuts. The guns were in four positions; the Old Man; High Boulogne; Base Boulogne; and the Boulemberg (Mont Lambert). When Boulogne was returned to France in March 1550, Edward VI noted that the guns too would be handed over. These included recently captured pieces and; 2 basilisks; 2 demi-cannon; 3 culverins; 2 demi-culverins; 3 sakers; 16 falcons; 94 arquebus a croc with wooden tails (muskets for fixed positions); and 21 iron guns.

=== Continuing conflict ===
There was a truce between the French and English at Boulogne according to a treaty made between Edward VI of England and Francis I of France in March 1547. In June 1547, an international dispute arose over a wall the English were building at the harbour. The French claimed it was a new fortification in breach of truce under the Treaty of Camp, while the English maintained that it was merely a sea wall to protect the haven. In the diplomacy, this dispute was connected with arguments over English and French intentions and intervention at St Andrews Castle in Scotland. In the summer of 1548, the French observed the mole was provided with a flanker and cannon; the English insisted it was merely to protect the workmen. French ships fired at it and the English returned fire. Edward Seymour, 1st Duke of Somerset told François van der Delft that the French were constructing forts at Boulogne in contravention of treaty in September 1548; in December the French managed to destroy two new outposts the English were building, and another fort nearer to Guînes and Calais called Fort Fiennes.

A major attempt on Boulogne by the French was repulsed in May 1549. The Imperial ambassador, Simon Renard, reported a failed assault on the fort at Boulemberg, or Mount Lambert. The French leader, Gaspard II de Coligny, sieur de Châtillon, a nephew of the Constable of France, set ladders against the fort at 2:00am but the alarm was sounded by members of the garrison who he believed he had successfully bribed. 200 French were killed. The English suspected treachery as four guns blew up on their first firing and around seventy men were absent without leave. The womenfolk in the fort were said to have saved the day. Some laughed at Châtillon, saying he had made his scaling ladders too short, although the action was well-conceived as the fort was crucial to the defence of the town. Moreover, the action was said to be in breach of treaty.

Edward VI recorded this night assault in his chronicle, with a failed attempt to burn the ships in the harbour. In the summer, Coligny bombarded the pier with a battery of 20,000 shot, and blockaded the mouth of the haven with artillery. The English overran this artillery position and the French set up another which was less commanding. An attempt to foul the harbour with a hulk laden with stones also failed to inconvenience the English garrison.

=== English withdrawal ===
Although by the Treaty of Camp, the English had agreed to evacuate Boulogne in 1554, the town was returned to France in 1550 under the Treaty of Boulogne which also concluded the war of Rough Wooing in Scotland. Simon Renard reported that the English captain accepted his order to surrender from the Privy Council with a sigh. Henry II of France formally entered the town on 16 May 1550. He stayed three days and visited the forts of the Boulemberg, Ambleteuse, the Tower of Ardres, the Great Fort and Fort Châtillon (also called Châtillon's garden). He was impressed with some of these recent fortification works and also with the English scheme for bringing freshwater to the town. Henry II determined to continue building the English star fort at Ambleteuse and the neighbouring work at Blackness. The French also admired the mole, which they called 'la Dunette,' and when completed Henry II compared it to a Roman work. The Basilica of Notre-Dame de Boulogne, destroyed or badly damaged by the English, was to be rebuilt, Henry II gave the church a silver statue of Our Lady, and other nobles subscribed money.

== In popular culture ==
The 1544 Siege of Boulogne by Henry VIII was depicted in the 4th season of the television series The Tudors.
