= David Blatherwick (artist) =

Canadian artist and educator (born 1960)

- Born: David Blatherwick; 1960 (age 65–66); Toronto, Ontario, Canada
- Education: Ryerson Polytechnical Institute (BA, 1984); Université du Québec à Montréal (MFA, 1989); Skowhegan School of Painting and Sculpture (GD, 1990)
- Known for: artist, educator

David Blatherwick RCA (born 1960) is a Canadian artist and educator.

== Education ==
He received a Bachelor of Arts in design from Ryerson Polytechnical Institute in 1984, a Master of Fine Arts from Université du Québec à Montréal in 1989, and attended the Skowhegan School of Painting and Sculpture in Maine in 1990. He is currently teaches at the University of Waterloo

== Career ==
In 1986, he was part of the Hybrid Cultures exhibit at Oboro gallery that showed the affinities between the art movements of Mexico City and Montreal. His first solo exhibition was in Montréal in 1988, and he has since been included in numerous museum exhibitions, including solo at the Art Gallery of Windsor, Robert McLaughlin Gallery, Musée national des beaux-arts du Québec, Taichung in Taiwan, Cité Internationale Universitaire de Paris, and the Mattress Factory in Pittsburgh, and as part of group exhibitions at galleries including Musée des Beaux-Arts de Nantes Metamorphose et Clônage, Musée d'art contemporain de Montréal, Power Plant in Toronto, Museo de Arte Moderno, and the Musée du Québec. His paintings and video installations brought him national attention in the late 1990s, and in 2002 his work was included in the Biennale de Montreal. In 2002, he became a member of Arte y Desarrollo, a group of development and experimental artists whose activities are centralized in rural Dominican Republic. Blatherwick has been the subject of numerous reviews and publications.

He has been guest speaker at Mattress Factory, University of Lethbridge, Concordia University, National Taiwan University of Arts, Taipei National University of the Arts, University of Western Ontario, Musée national du beaux-arts du Québec, and Guelph University.

His work, through private sales or charity auctions, is held in numerous public and private collections, including Art Bank of Canada, Banque Nationale du Canada, Musée d'art contemporain de Montréal, and the Musée national des beaux-arts du Québec. He has been the recipient of numerous awards and fellowships, including from the Skowhegan School of Painting and Sculpture, the Conseil des arts et des lettres du Québec, the Canada Council, the Pollock-Krasner Foundation, and the University of Windsor, and has published and contributed to several critical essays, and publications.

== Work ==
His solo exhibition Cheese, Worms and the Holes in Everything, was presented at the Art Gallery of Windsor in 2007, Art Mûr gallery, in Montreal, and the Robert McLaughlin Gallery of Oshawa in 2008. Its production was also included in many exhibitions and was immortalized in a catalog of the same name. Initially interested in the potential for interconnectivity suggested by new media and the internet, Blatherwick evoked the immense complexity of these center-less networks in his paintings. Later in his career, his interest shifted to the more perilous biological activity found in our own bodies. "Fusing the technological and the biological in a single frame of reference, David Blatherwick has evolved his painting language while offering ample high-tech and organic eye candy to the viewer's hungry eye". Consistent throughout his entire oeuvre is a fascination with all forms of seething, rampant life, with organic shapes that bring to mind intestines, stomachs, molecules and viruses.
