= Rocksavage =

Coordinates: 53.3153°N 2.7135°W

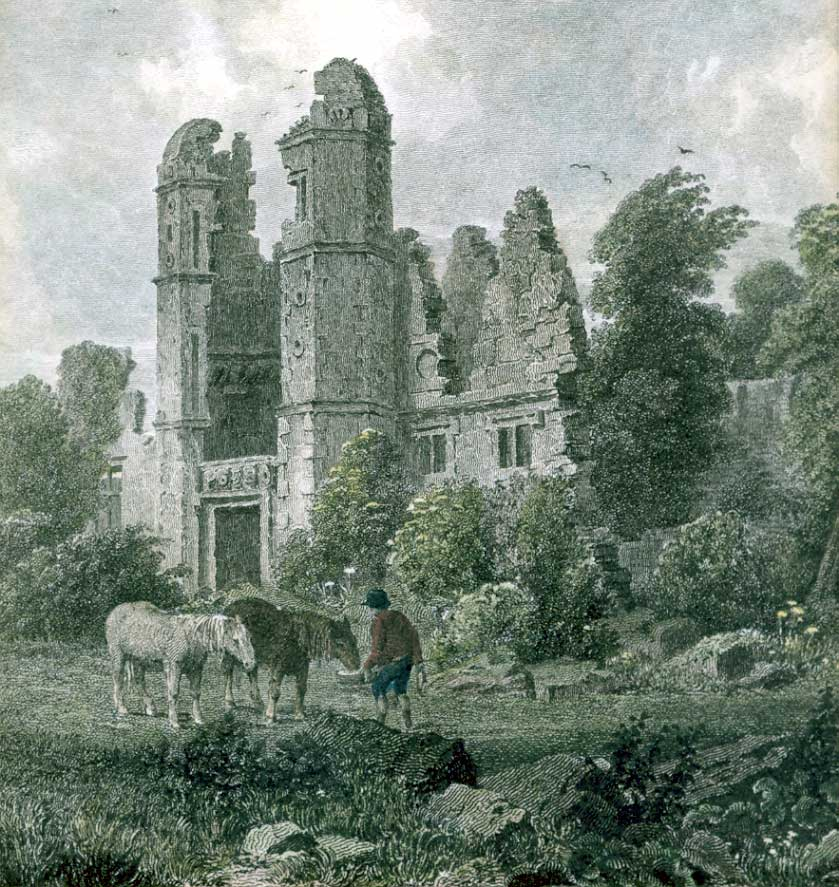
- Ruins of Rocksavage c. 1818; the octagonal towers flanked the gateway
- Interactive map of the Rocksavage area

General information
- Status: Ruined (limited fragments remain)
- Architectural style: Elizabethan, prodigy house
- Location: Clifton, Runcorn, Cheshire, England
- Construction started: 1565
- Completed: 1568
- Demolished: Ruined by 1782

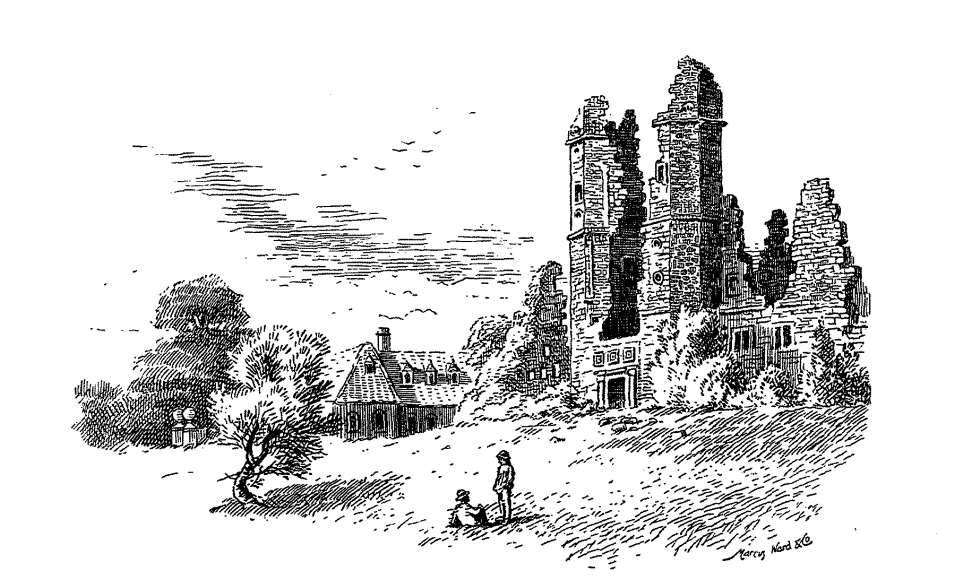
A sketch of Rocksavage and Clifton Hall

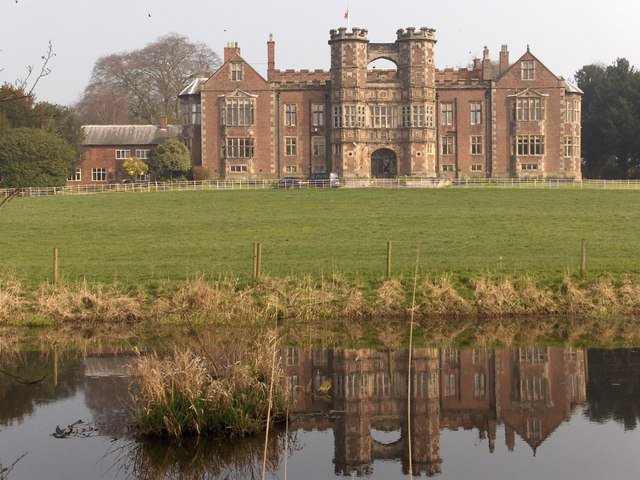
Brereton Hall, a later house which was modelled on Rocksavage, and offers a representation of how the house once looked

Rocksavage or Rock Savage was an Elizabethan mansion in Cheshire, England, which served as the primary seat of the Savage family. The house lies in ruins, at SJ526799 in Clifton (now a district of Runcorn). Built in the 1560s for Sir John Savage, Rocksavage was one of the great Elizabethan houses of the county, a leading example of the Elizabethan prodigy house; in 1674, it was the second largest house in Cheshire. James I visited in 1617. The house was abandoned after it passed into the Cholmondeley family early in the 18th century, and by 1782 only ruins remained.

Rocksavage comprised a sandstone quadrangle around a central courtyard, with paired octagonal towers flanking the main entrance. Only fragments of its garden and orchard walls are still standing; they are listed as Grade II.

== History ==
The Savage family were important Cheshire landowners from the late 1370s, when the family acquired lands at Clifton by the marriage of John Savage (d. 1386) to Margaret Danyers. Sir John Savage (d. 1597) built a new house at Clifton, which came to be known as Rock Savage, on a hillside overlooking the River Weaver. Started in around 1565, the sandstone house was completed in 1568 and was one of the great Elizabethan prodigy houses of Cheshire. Hearth-tax assessments of 1674 show that it was the second largest house in the county, its fifty hearths being surpassed only by Cholmondeley House. An early 17th-century description praised the mansion's "magnificent fabric". The medieval family seat of Clifton Hall stood nearby, and was retained as farm and service buildings.

John Savage's son, also named John (1554–1615) was the Seneschal of Halton Castle, and also served at various times as a Member of Parliament for Cheshire, Mayor of Chester and High Sheriff of Cheshire.

James I dined at Rocksavage with his retinue on 21 August 1617 on his way to Vale Royal Abbey and Chester. John Savage, 2nd Earl Rivers (1603–1654), declared for the royalist side during the Civil War; Rocksavage was ransacked by parliamentarian forces, and the roof and part of the walls were destroyed. The first Duke of Monmouth stayed at Rocksavage on 13 September 1682 as a guest of Thomas Savage, 3rd Earl Rivers, while touring Cheshire to assess support for a faction opposed to Charles II.

The estate passed by marriage to James Barry, Earl of Barrymore in the early 18th century. Further buildings were constructed higher up the hill by Lord Barrymore, possibly by the architect Henry Sephton. Now known as Clifton Hall, these might have been intended as a replacement for Rocksavage or as service buildings for the main mansion. A few years after these buildings were erected, Rocksavage was abandoned after the 4th earl's daughter and heiress, Lady Penelope Barry, married into the Cholmondeley family and the principal seat of the combined estate became Cholmondeley House; the empty house soon decayed and was already in ruins by 1782.

The Marquesses of Cholmondeley use the courtesy title Earl of Rocksavage, one of their subsidiary titles, for heirs apparent to the marquessate.

== Description ==
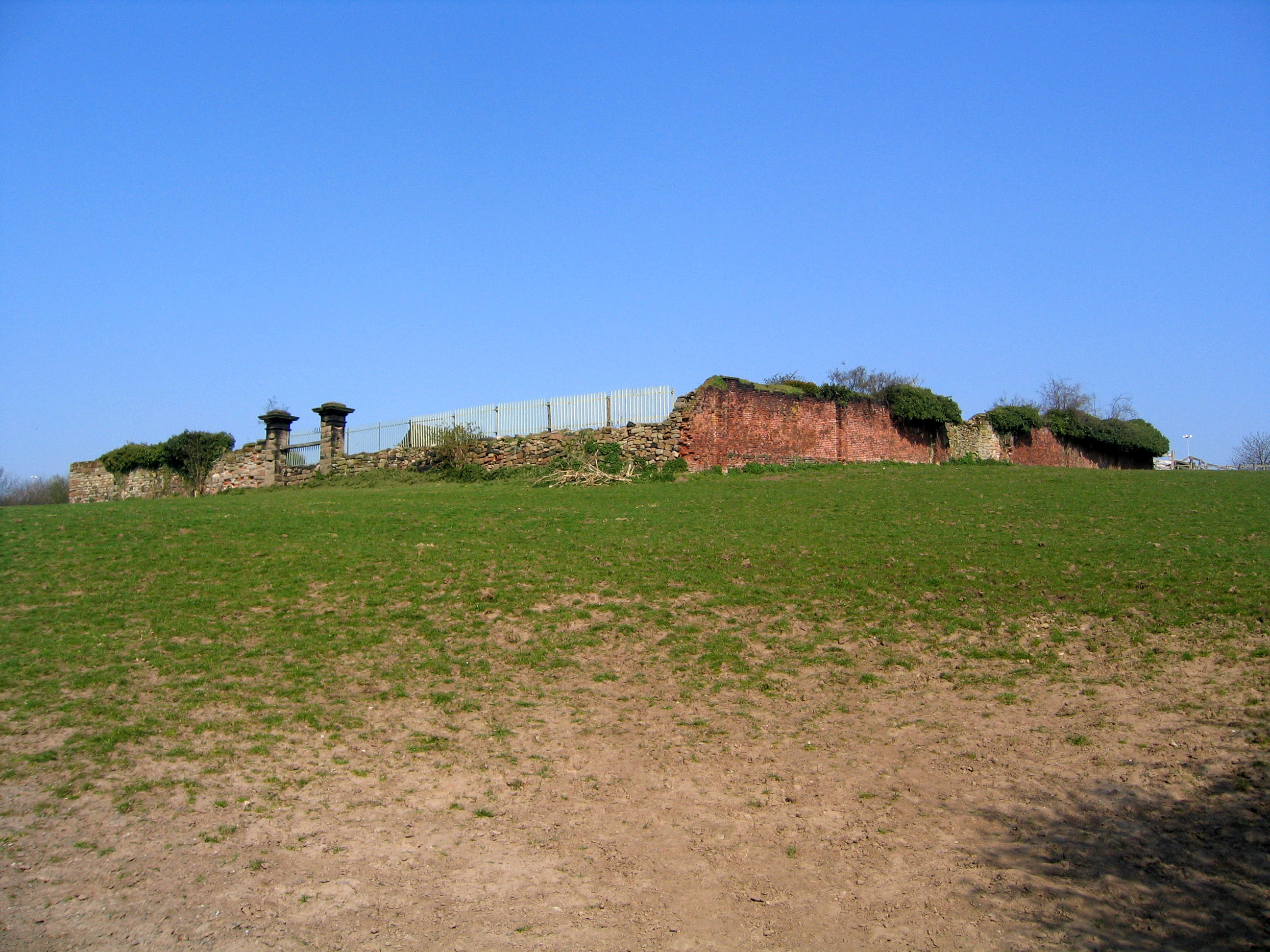
Ruins of Rocksavage in 2007

The design of the Elizabethan mansion was a quadrangle of four bays in the local red sandstone, built around a central courtyard, and was symmetrical but not classical. The main entrance was a gateway flanked by octagonal towers with domed tops and bridged by a crenellated wall. The towers are prominent in an engraving of the ruins, after Peter de Wint, which dates from around 1818 and appears in George Ormerod's The History of the County Palatine and City of Chester. Brereton Hall, built some twenty years later by Sir John Savage's ward and son-in-law Sir William Brereton, was modelled on Rocksavage and copied its paired octagonal towers. Unlike Brereton Hall, the string courses of the Rocksavage towers extended around the adjoining walls.

The last major remnant of the house fell in around 1980. Only the orchard gateposts and fragments of garden and orchard walls now remain near the Weaver Viaduct over the M56 in Runcorn; they are designated by Historic England as Grade II-listed.

The 18th-century Clifton Hall was originally a U-shaped brick building with prominent stone pilasters. One arm of the has been demolished and the remnants are now surrounded by farm buildings.

== Legacy ==
The house gave its name to a riverside area downstream of Clifton, now within the Weston area of Runcorn. In this area are Rocksavage Power Station and Rocksavage Works, a chemical plant built by ICI and now owned by Ineos, which in its heyday employed 6,000.

== See also ==
- Listed buildings in Runcorn (rural area)
