= Siege of Boulogne (1492) =

1492 siege of Boulogne by Henry VII

The siege of Boulogne took place during the autumn of 1492. Henry VII of England had led an expeditionary force of 12,000 troops across the Channel to Calais and began to besiege the French port of Boulogne on 18 October. After several weeks the siege was broken off when Henry and the French monarch Charles VIII agreed to the Peace of Étaples. The siege had proved to be a successful show of force and Henry was offered very favourable terms by Charles, including the end of French support to the pretender to the English throne Perkin Warbeck, Warbeck was also expelled from the country. The terms of the treaty also included the English accepting French control of Brittany, and the French paying Henry an indemnity of 742,000 crowns, payable at 50,000 crowns per annum, equivalent to 5% of the crown's annual income. Henry had been in negotiations even before the campaign, and the move against Boulogne may have been intended to put further pressure on Charles.

== Events of the siege ==
The siege itself was largely unremarkable, save the fact that the knight Sir John Savage who had helped put Henry on the throne (commanding the left flank of his army at the Battle of Bosworth Field) was killed during its course. Savage was sent to conduct reconnoitring (reconnaissance of the defences in preparation for the military offensive). Savage left his tent and rode around the walls of the city with another knight and Bosworth veteran Sir John Riseley, in order to assess the strength of the walls and other fortifications. The two knights were intercepted by the enemy and captured. Despite being heavily outnumbered Sir John Savage refused to surrender to them and fought to his death. His actions created enough of a diversion to allow Sir John Riseley to escape and flee on 'a most speedy horse'.

== Return to England ==
English troops withdrew to Calais and Henry returned to England. Fifty years later further English attempts against Boulogne were led by Henry's son Henry VIII. Henry VIII's forces took the city in September 1544 and then defended the city against French attempts to reclaim it later that year.

== Bibliography ==
- Roger Lockyer & Andrew Thrush. Henry VII. Routledge, 19 Sep 2014.
- Thomas Penn. Winter King: Henry VII and the Dawn of Tudor England. Simon and Schuster, 2013.
