= St Luke's Church, Redcliffe Gardens =

Church in Chelsea, London, England

Coordinates: 51.487737°N 0.189387°W

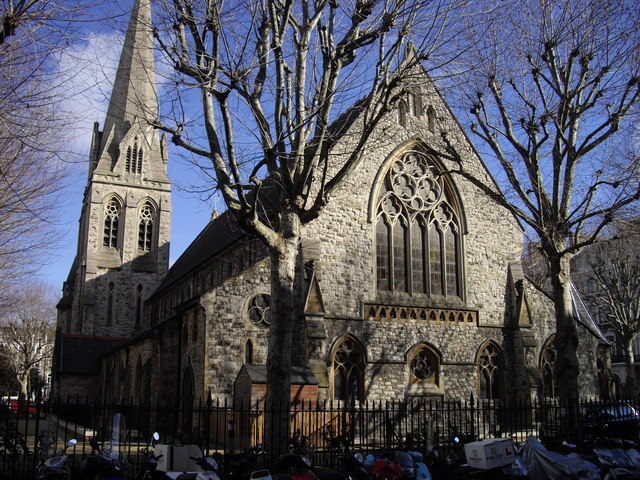
St Luke's Church, Redcliffe Gardens

St Luke's, Redcliffe Gardens, is an Anglican church in Redcliffe Gardens, bordering on Redcliffe Square, London. It was built in 1872–73 to designs by George and Henry Godwin. It has been Grade II listed since 2003.

Pevsner describes it as "the last and the grandest of the three Kensington churches by the Godwins". The other two are St Mary, The Boltons (1849–50) and St Jude's, Courtfield Gardens (1870). It's chiefly remarkable for the quantity of sculptural embellishment, he says, including the celebration of Psalm 150 in the sanctuary.

During the early 1950s composer Francis Routh began holding new music concerts in the church that led to the Redcliffe Festival between 1957 and 1961, and to the formation of the Redcliffe Concerts of British Music series (1963-1989).
