= James Gunter =

English confectioner, market gardener and property developer (1731–1819)

James Gunter (25 July 1731 – 19 September 1819) was an English confectioner, market gardener and property developer who laid the foundations for what became one of the great residential estates in West London, developed by his descendants, the "Redcliffe Estate" and The Boltons in Little Chelsea and West Brompton.

== Career ==
Gunter was taken into partnership in 1777 by Domenico Negri who had opened a confectioner's shop in Berkeley Square, Mayfair, in 1757 under the sign of the Pot and Pine Apple. In 1797 Gunter was living in New Bond Street, Mayfair, when an incident occurred which showed his nature. A servant of his had stolen and pawned a silver ladle and other goods and was found guilty at the Old Bailey. Her defence was "Mr. Gunter has been a worthy master to me, I hope he will be favourable; he always behaved well to me" resulted in her receiving a fine of one shilling and six months in the House of Correction, while others convicted of similar crimes were sentenced to seven years transportation.

By the early 1800s Gunter's confectioner's business in Berkeley Square was flourishing. The royal dukes frequented his shop. He had served them when they were children. Gunter was ordered in 1805 to organise the catering and confectionary for a magnificent five day visit when the Marquess of Buckingham entertained the Prince of Wales and the Duke of Clarence at Stowe.

Gunter's shop was mentioned in the Epicure's Almanack (1815) in terms, Elizabeth David describes as 'reserved':

'We could not, if we would, leave Berkeley Square without paying a tribute to the merit of Mr Gunter, as a cook, confectioner, and fruiterer, if not the first, as Goldsmith says of somebody else, in the very first line. Mr Gunger has had for many years the high honour of supplying the Royal Family with articles from his shop. Some of the Royal Dukes condescend occasionally to give Mr Gunter a call for the purpose of tasting his pines, as if in gratitude for the many sweet repasts furnished to them from Mr Gunter's shop during their juvenile days'.

Gunter decided to develop his own farms and market gardens to grow fruit which supplied his shop with the materials needed for his confectioners and cooks. Strawberries, raspberries, red currants and apricots were grown in enormous quantities. The fruit was used fresh in ices and creams during the summer and preserved in jellies, syrups and jams for use in the winter.

He first became involved in the Earl's Court area - then a prime market garden area in the parish of St Mary Abbots, Kensington - when he took a sub-lease of part of Home Field and Great Court Field from a local farmer in 1797. He bought the freehold of these properties in 1799. He also bought Earls Court Lodge which became the Gunters’ family home for 60 years. By 1799 he had also become sole proprietor of Gunter's Tea Shop which became one of the most fashionable Mayfair meeting places. Earls Court Lodge, Gunter's family house in Earl's Court, where fruit jellies were a highlight of their ball suppers, was known by children at a neighbouring mansion as 'currant jelly hall'.

In 1805 Gunter purchased some land where Coleherne Road and Redcliffe Square are now situated. By 1807 Gunter had also bought from speculative builder Thomas Smith some land in Great Court Field and the Home Field land. He also bought a large plot from William Boulton where in 1850 his son Robert I Gunter commenced the building of The Boltons, an exclusive residential area still in existence. He was unsuccessful in his bid to buy some land that would have connected his other plots to The Boltons area but carried on acquiring land on a piecemeal basis with more land at Redcliffe Square and the Boltons and in 1812 bought land between the Boltons and Fulham Road. He started building villas on his property between 1808 and 1810 around Earls Court Road and Old Brompton Road, although these were subsequently demolished in later developments.

== Marriage and children ==
Gunter had four daughters (Anne, Caroline, Elizabeth Negri, and Charlotte) and a son:

- Robert I Gunter (d.1852), to whom he bequeathed his estate in tail male. Robert purchased further land and in 1850 began building the exclusive residential area now known as "The Boltons". He married Fanny Thompson, by whom he had two sons, who further developed the "Redcliffe Estate", including Redcliffe Gardens (east side), Redcliffe Square, Tregunter Road (apparently suggesting a Cornish or Welsh origin to the family name) etc.:
  - Sir Robert Gunter, 1st Baronet (1831–1905), eldest son and heir to his grandfather under the entail. He was an officer in the Dragoon Guards and fought in the Crimean War, and was later a Member of Parliament. He voluntarily shared his inherited lands with his younger brother and developed the property extensively particularly after the arrival of the District Railway at West Brompton. Having resided at Earl's Court Place, an old mansion on his estate (since demolished) he moved to Wetherby Grange in Yorkshire in 1857.
  - James II Gunter (born 1833), Dragoon Guards, fought in the Crimean War, inherited further land from his father, which together with his brother he developed as the Redcliffe Estate .

== Death and burial ==
Gunter died at Worthing, Sussex in 1819, following a fit of apoplexy, and was buried in the churchyard of St Mary Abbots, Kensington.

== See also ==
- Pettiward Estate, adjoining the Redcliffe Estate to the west.
