= St Jude's Church, Kensington =

Coordinates: 51.4937°N 0.1880°W

St Jude's Church, Courtfield Gardens
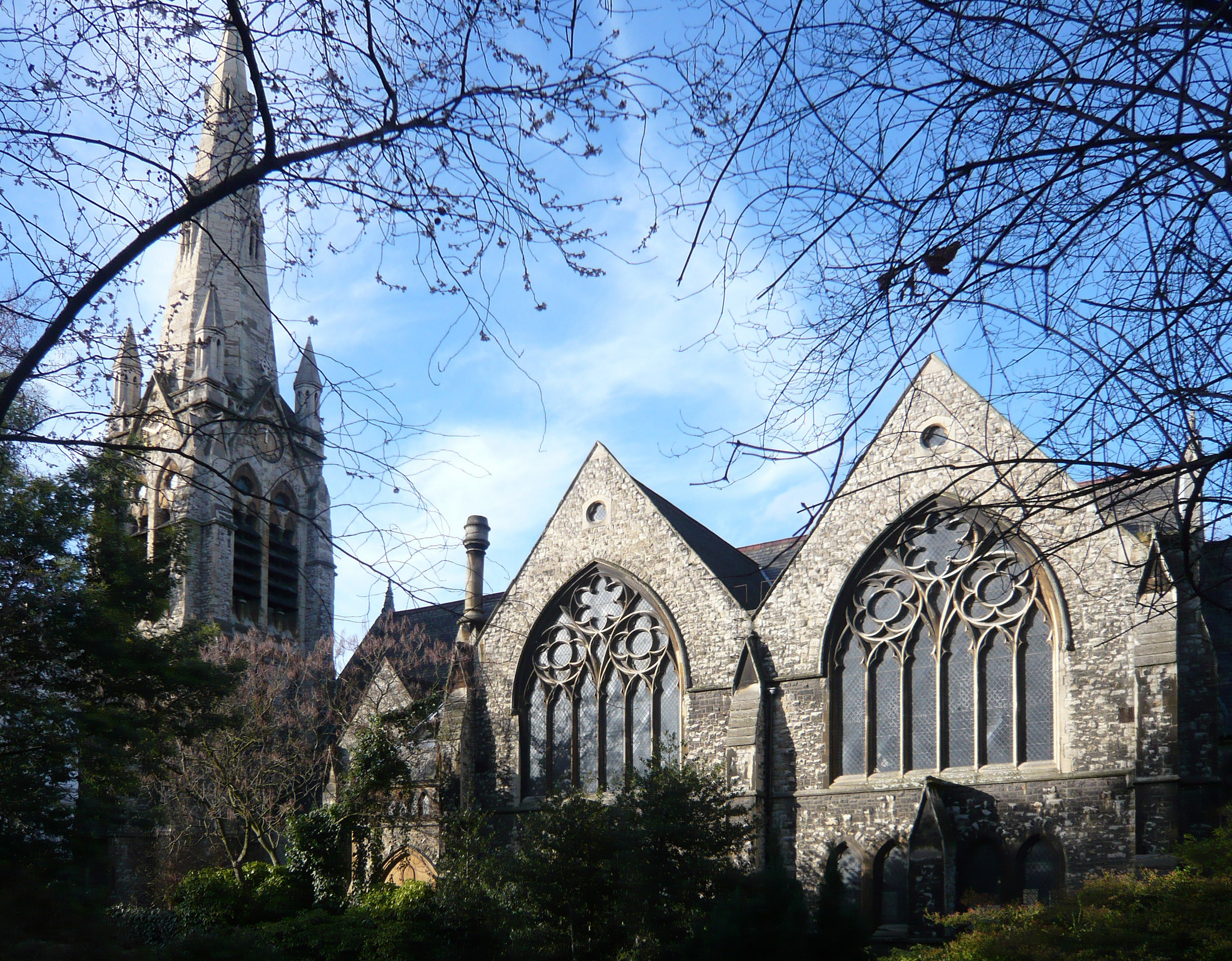
- South elevation of St Jude's Church
- Location: 24 Collingham Road, Kensington, London SW5 0LX

History
- Dedication: Saint Jude

Architecture
- Architect(s): George Godwin & Henry Godwin, HMDW Architects

St Jude's Church, Courtfield Gardens, Kensington, London, was designed by architects George Godwin and Henry Godwin, and built between 1867 and 1870; the tower and spire were constructed in 1879. It was built on the northern portion of Captain Robert Gunter's estate. The project was overseen by Reverend John Astbury Aston, and financed by John Derby Allcroft, a wealthy glove manufacturer. The construction, not including the tower, pulpit, font and organ cost £11,300, and was undertaken by Myers & Sons.

The building is now occupied by St Mellitus College, led by the Dean, Russell Winfield. The college runs ordination and theology courses. On Sundays the building is one of five sites where the church of Holy Trinity Brompton meets.

== Original exterior ==
St Jude's Church is surrounded by Courtfield Gardens, Collingham Road, and Courtfield Road. Adjacent to the north is the Vicarage (built in 1874), also designed by George and Henry Godwin.

The building was realised in a Gothic Revival style. It was built of Kentish ragstone, with ashlar stone dressings and has steeply pitched gabled roofs, of more than forty roof slopes. The roof is slate, in varying coloured bands of pale and dark grey tiles.

== Original interior ==
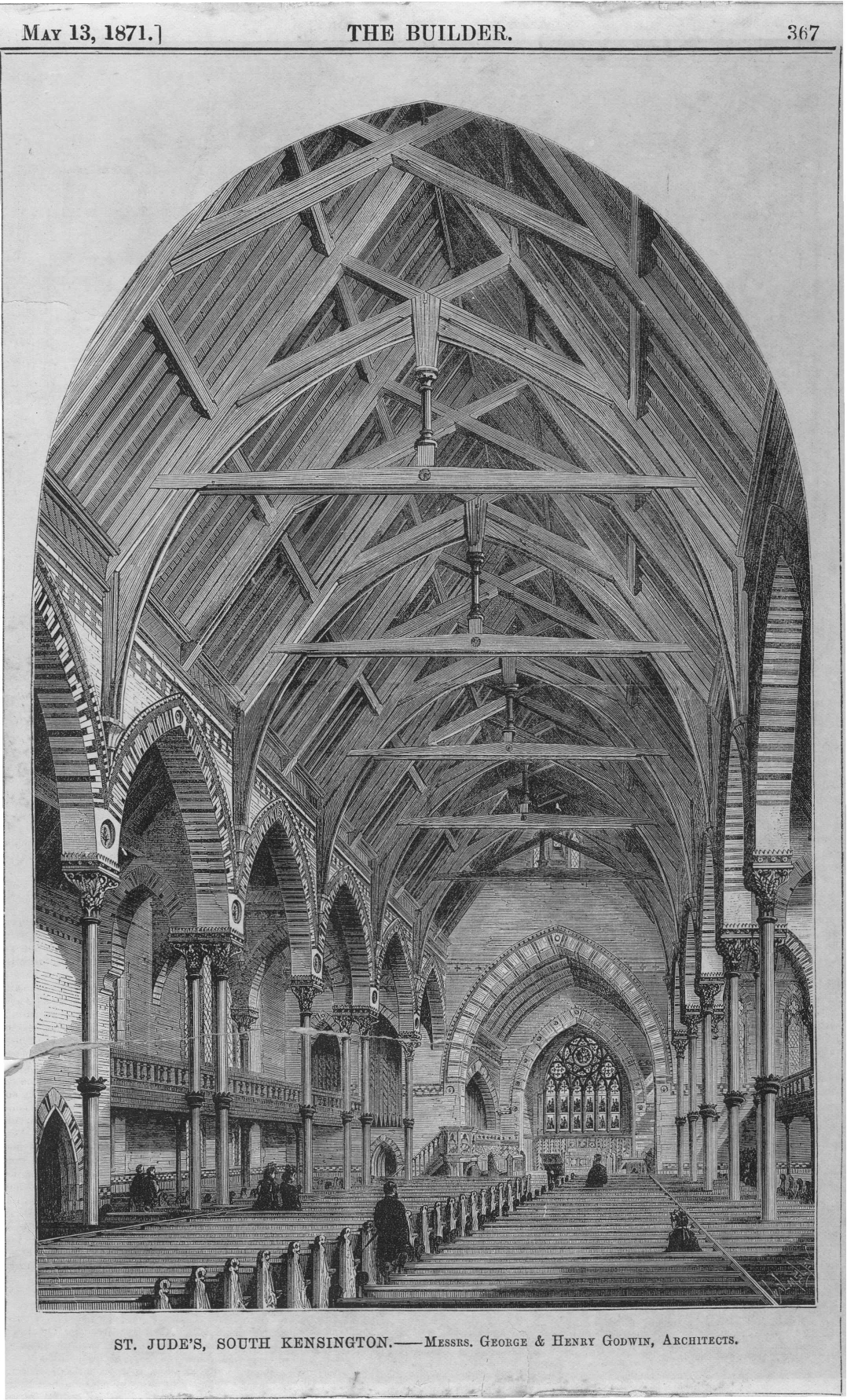
Nave, as built, 1871, featured in The Builder

The nave has galleries at a first floor level, on the north, west and south sides. It is unusually wide for its length, and has banded iron columns with sheet copper crafted capitals. The brickwork contains elaborate patterns of buff, red and black bricks, and murals in roundels above the column capitals, and in the reveal of the chancel arch, painted by Edward Frampton. The nave has diagonally-set quarry tiles, and the chancel is Minton tiles.

The chancel has several interesting features: the reredos is alabaster, with mosaics by Antonio Salviati, and sculpted figures of St Jude, St Peter, and St Augustine. The pulpit is marble and alabaster, and the lectern is brass. These were designed by Thomas Earp and crafted by Edward Frampton.

== Use of the building ==
The Reverend Robert William Forest D.D. was the first incumbent of the church, and later was Dean of Worcester. The building was designed for a capacity of up to 1600 during services by utilising the nave, narthex, and galleries.

The building was listed Grade II* on 7 November 1984.

In 2006, the parishioners of St Jude's Church were absorbed into St Mary the Boltons, doubling the latter's congregation. Meanwhile, the building was taken over by Holy Trinity Brompton Church (HTB).

== Building project ==
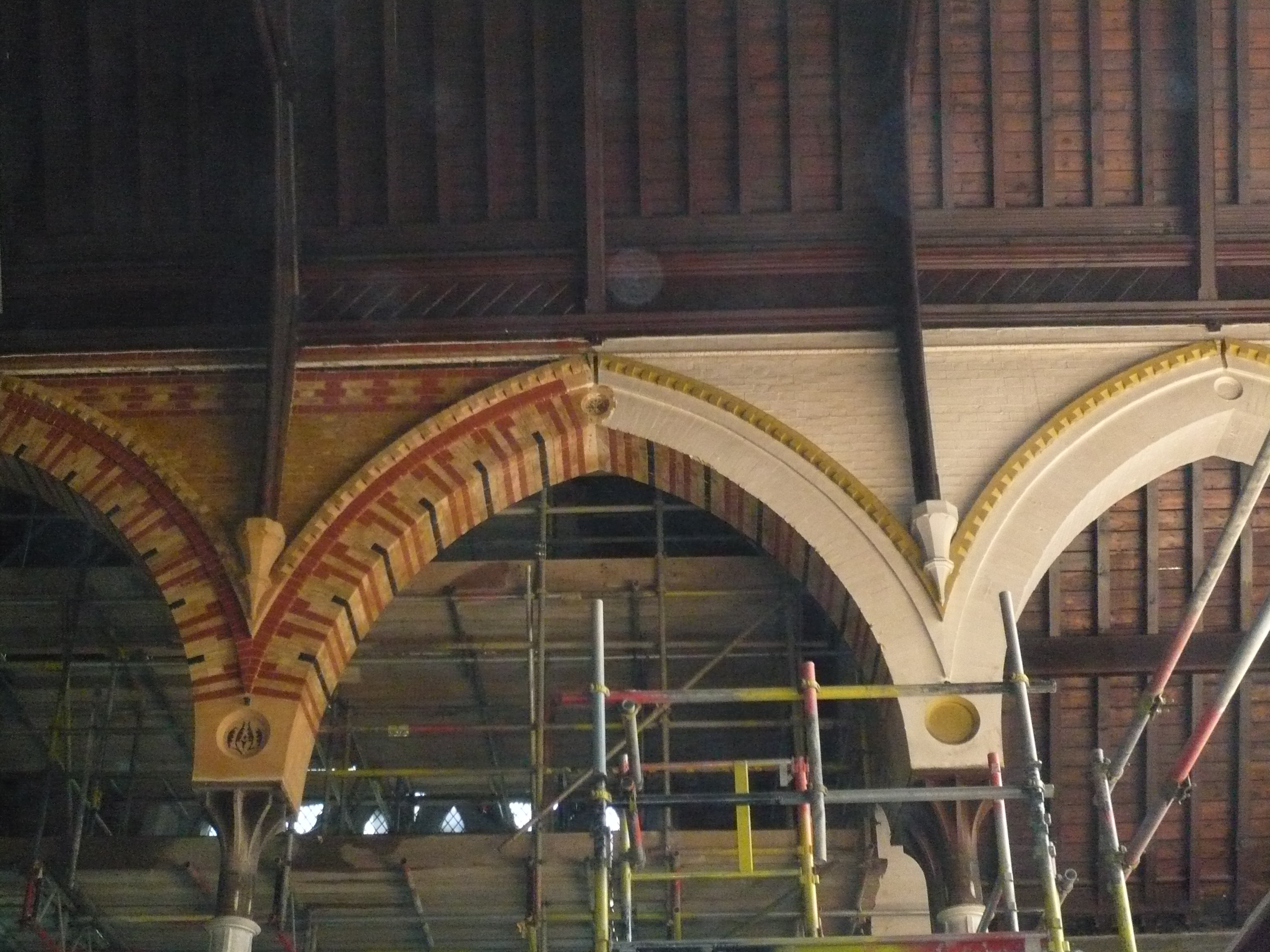
Paintwork being removed during building project

Under the leadership of HTB, and designed by HMDW Architects, work began in 2010 to transform the building into a theological college – St Mellitus College. The roof was entirely replaced, with like-for-like slates. The newly excavated undercroft houses two lecture rooms, offices and amenities. On the ground floor, the nave has been divided with intrusive glass screens, reducing its width significantly, and reducing its length by a full bay. A café has been installed in the greatly enlarged narthex. It has all been floored with a typical office-style carpet, which complements the modern commercial building ceiling of the new narthex. A new first floor, at the same level of the galleries, provides a library above the Narthex Café for students of the college. The western exterior entrance stonework has been cleaned, and the interior white paint, applied to cover the brickwork, has been removed. Archived memorials have been reinstated. The appearance of the nave has been greatly altered, the sides of which have been lined with vertical blinds, which hang in front of the new glass partitions.

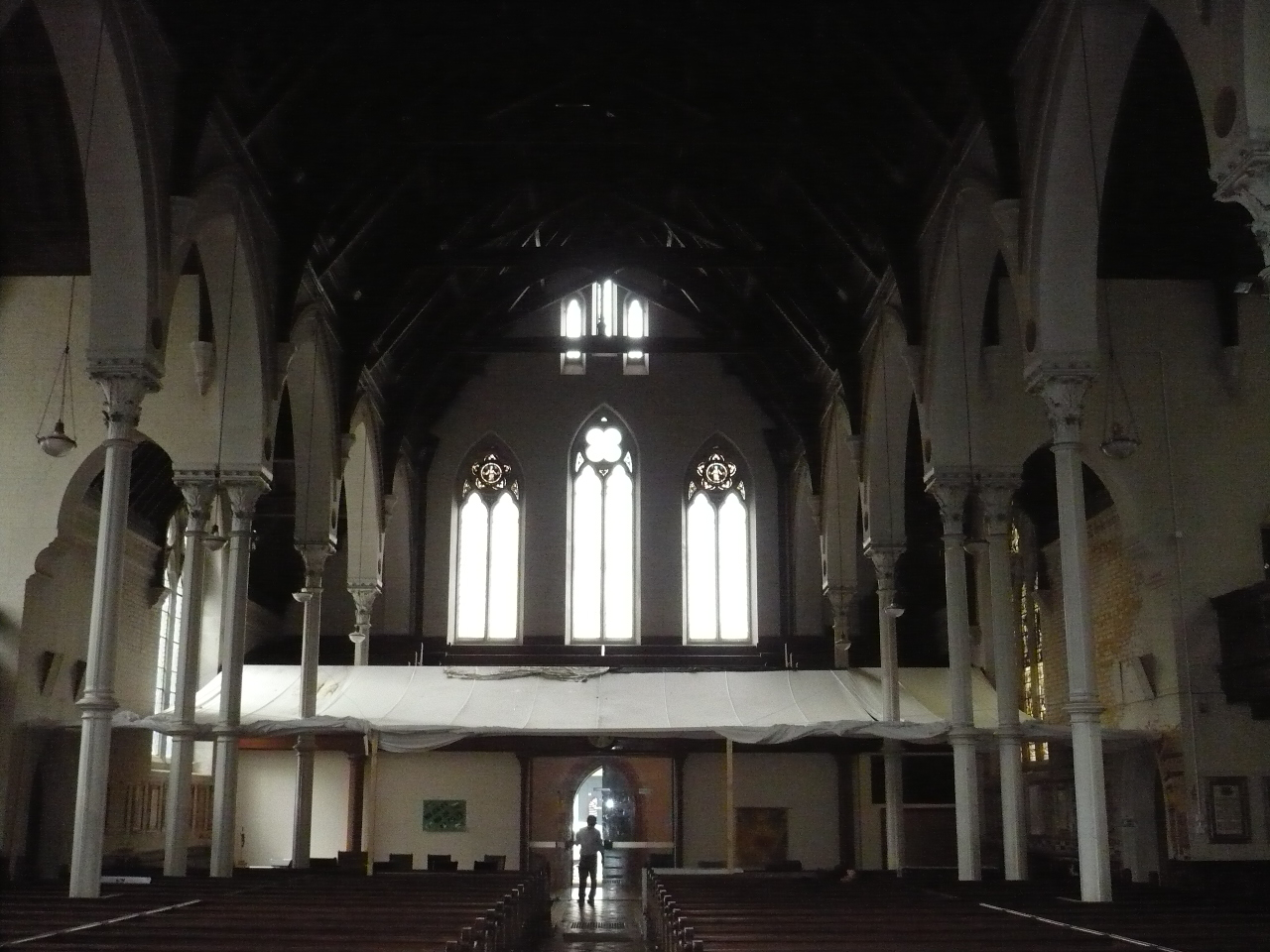
Nave, looking west, before building work began, 2009

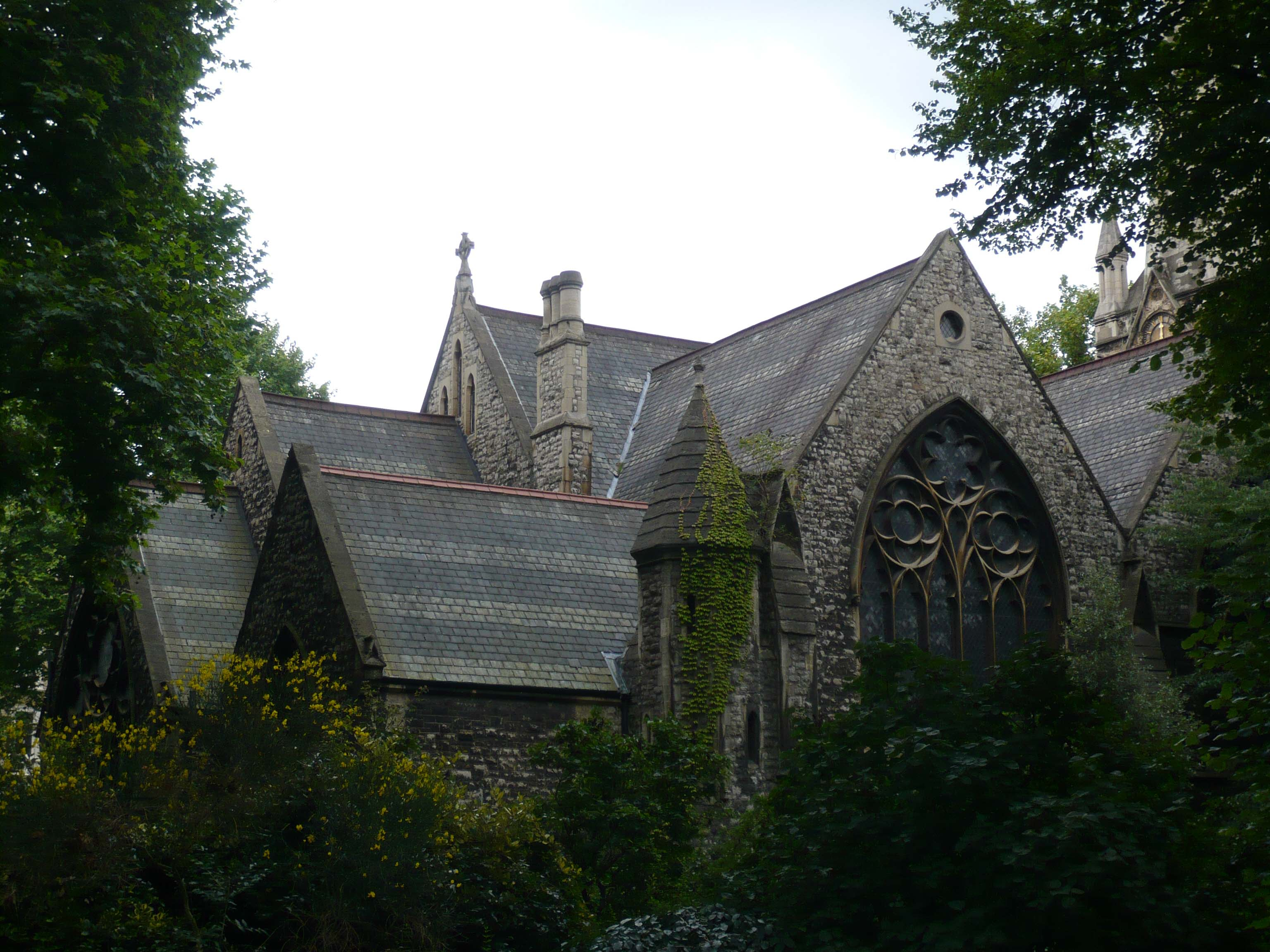
North East exterior, before building work began, note the slate banding

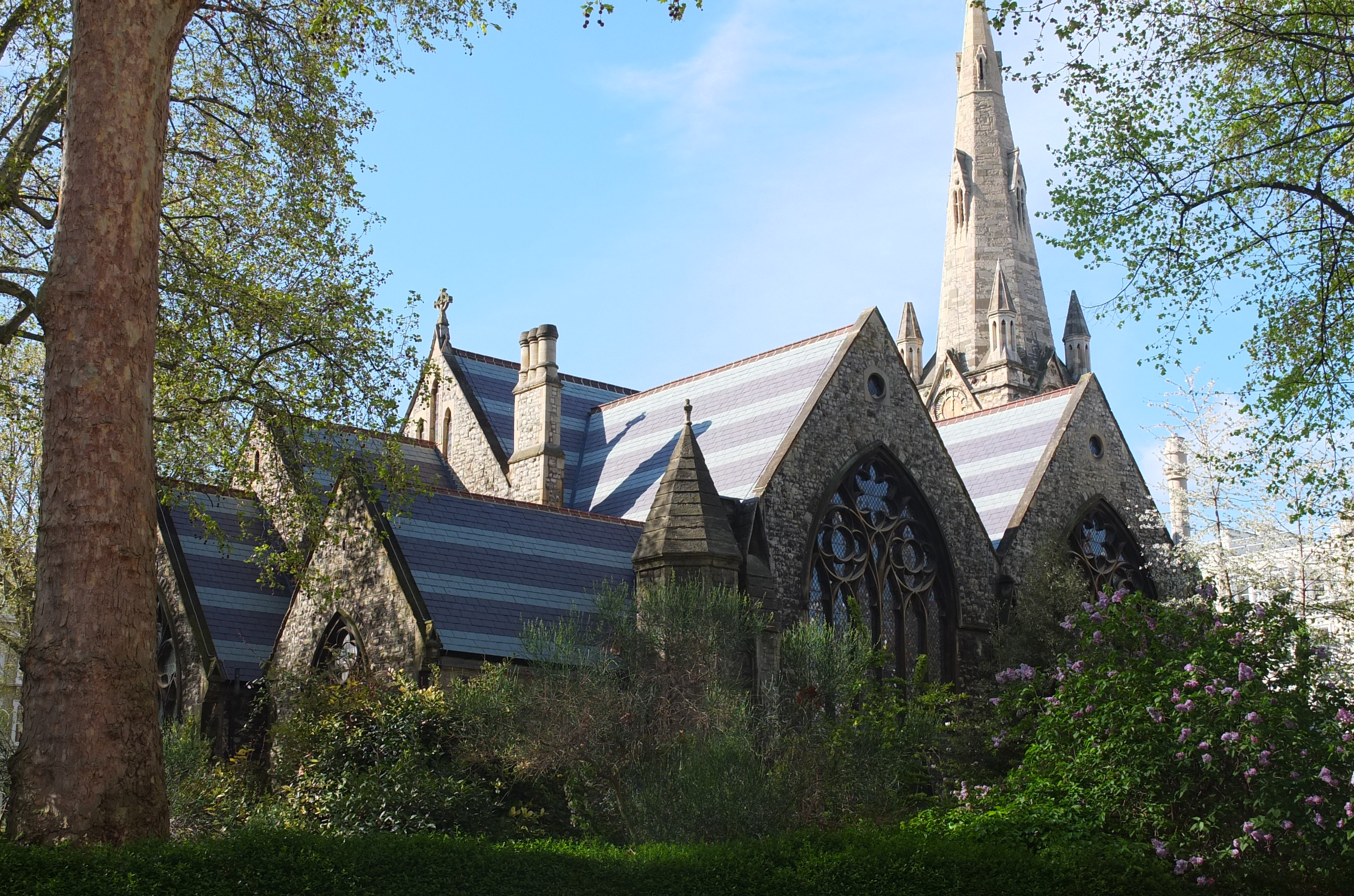
After redevelopment by HMDW Architects. External view from the garden of the new roof

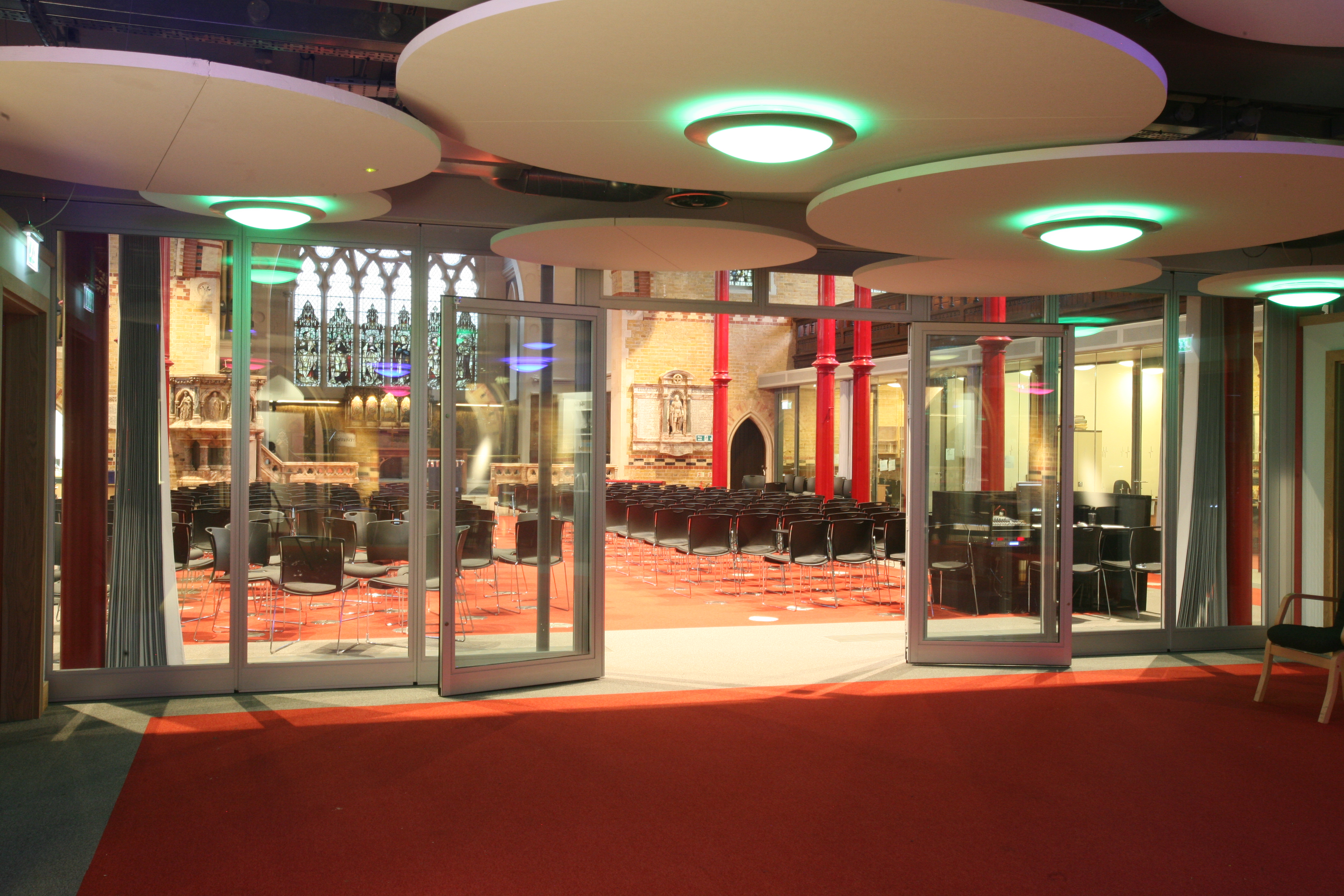
Cafe view east

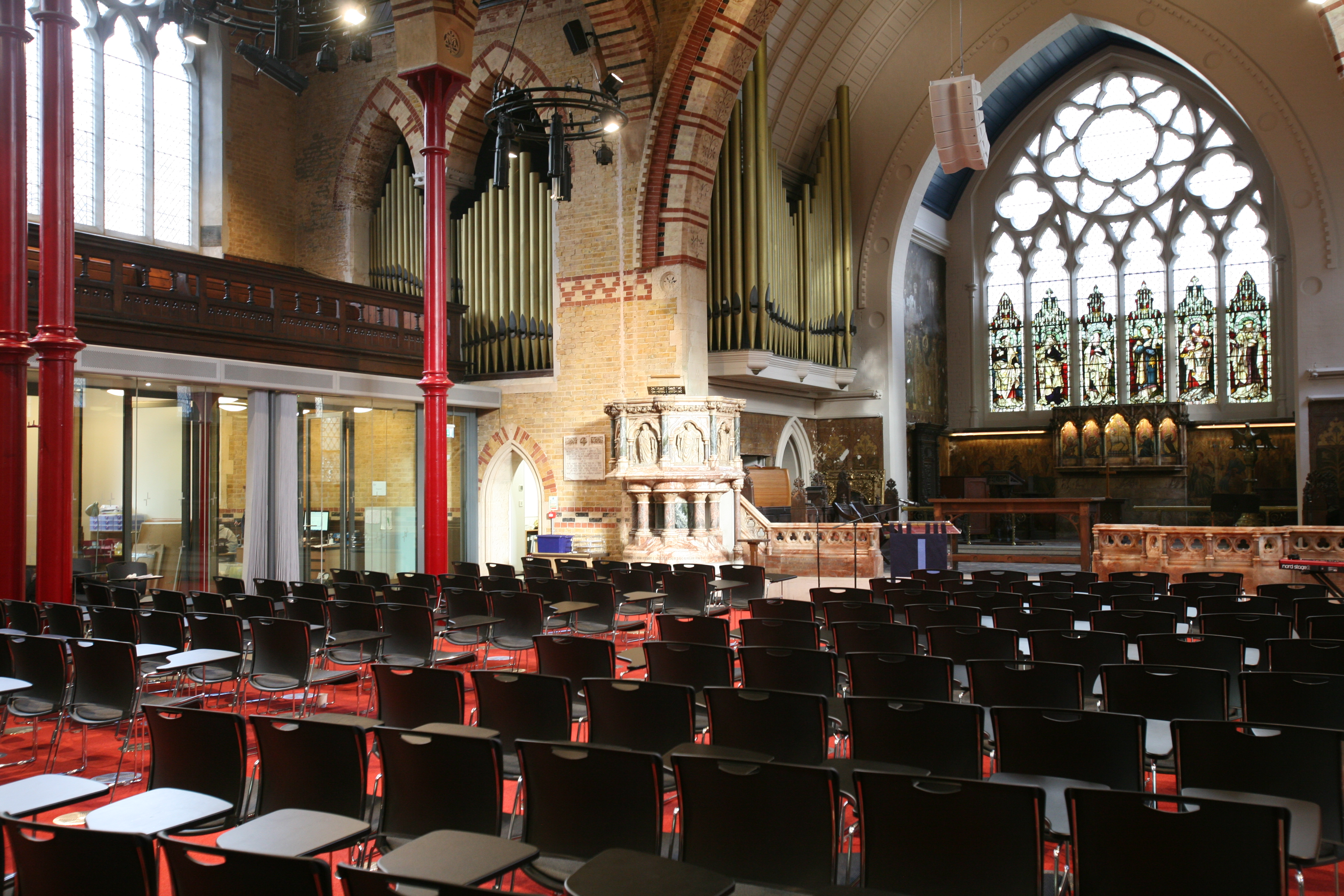
Nave view east, towards the Pulpit, the North Gallery and Offices under the Gallery

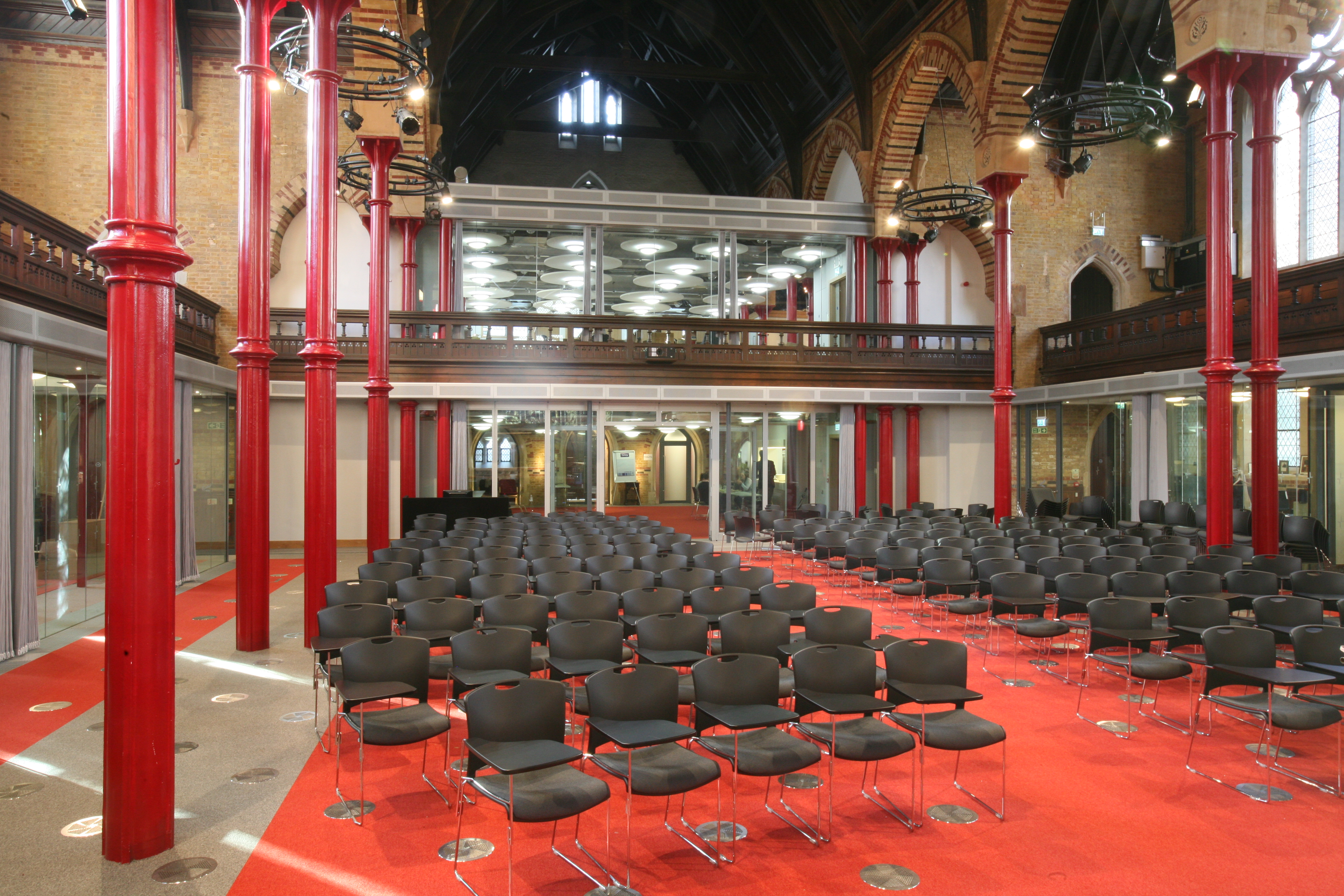
Nave view west, towards the Cafe, with Library at first floor level. The Timber Gallery balustrade surrounds the nave at first floor level
