= Barkston Ash (constituency) =

Parliamentary constituency in the United Kingdom, 1885–1983

- Former county constituency for the House of Commons

1885–1983
- Seats: one
- Created from: Eastern West Riding of Yorkshire
- Replaced by: Elmet, Selby and Harrogate

Barkston Ash was a parliamentary constituency centred on the village of Barkston Ash in the West Riding of Yorkshire (now part of West Yorkshire and North Yorkshire). It was represented in the House of Commons of the Parliament of the United Kingdom from 1885 until 1983. It elected one Member of Parliament (MP) by the first past the post system of election.

== History ==
The constituency was created under the Redistribution of Seats Act 1885, and in the main returned Conservative MPs at every general election until its abolition. However, it was briefly represented by the Liberal Joseph Andrews, who won the seat at a by-election in October 1905 after the death of its first MP, Sir Robert Gunter. The Conservatives regained the seat at the 1906 general election.

At the 1983 general election, Barkston Ash was replaced by the Selby constituency. As of the 2010 general election, the modern equivalent of Barkston Ash is Selby and Ainsty.

== Boundaries ==
The Redistribution of Seats Act 1885 provided that the constituency was to consist of-

- the Sessional Divisions of-
  - Lower Barkston Ash
  - Skyrack (except so much as is comprised in the Osgoldcross and Pudsey Divisions)
  - Upper Barkston Ash (except so much as is comprised in the Osgoldcross Division)
  - Wetherby (except the Parishes (which are in the Wapentake of the Ainsty of York) of Tockwith, Bickerton, Thorpe Arch, Bilton, and Walton), and
- the Parishes of Grimston, Kirkby Wharf with North Milford, Newton Kyme with Toulston, Stutton with Hazlewood, Tadcaster West, Towton and Ulleskelf.

1918–1950: The Urban Districts of Garforth and Selby, the Rural Districts of Bishopthorpe, Selby, Tadcaster, and Wetherby, and in the Rural District of Great Ouseburn the parishes of Acomb, Hessay, Knapton, Moor Monkton, Nether Poppleton, Rufforth, and Upper Poppleton.

1950–1983: The Urban Districts of Garforth and Selby, the Rural Districts of Selby and Wetherby, the Rural District of Tadcaster except the parishes of Great and Little Preston, and Swillington, and in the Rural District of Nidderdale the parishes of Hessay, Knapton, Moor Monkton, Nether Poppleton, Rufforth, and Upper Poppleton.

== Members of Parliament ==
Election	Member	Party
1885	Robert Gunter	Conservative
1905	Joseph Andrews	Liberal
1906	George Lane-Fox	Conservative
1931	Sir Leonard Ropner	Conservative
1964	Michael Alison	Conservative
1983	constituency abolished: see Selby	

== Elections ==
=== Elections in the 1880s ===
Thomas Bayley

General election 1885: Barkston Ash
Party	Candidate	Votes	%	±%
Conservative	Robert Gunter	4,600	63.1	
Liberal	Thomas Bayley	2,694	36.9	
Majority		1,906	26.2	
Turnout		7,294	86.7	
Registered electors		8,411		
Conservative win (new seat)				

Robert Gunter

General election 1886: Barkston Ash
Party	Candidate	Votes	%	±%
Conservative	Robert Gunter	Unopposed		
Conservative hold				

=== Elections in the 1890s ===
General election 1892: Barkston Ash
Party	Candidate	Votes	%	±%
Conservative	Robert Gunter	4,161	58.8	N/A
Liberal	Archibald Witham Scarr	2,920	41.2	New
Majority		1,241	17.6	N/A
Turnout		7,081	76.0	N/A
Registered electors		9,322		
Conservative hold		Swing	N/A	

General election 1895: Barkston Ash
Party	Candidate	Votes	%	±%
Conservative	Robert Gunter	Unopposed		
Conservative hold				

=== Elections in the 1900s ===
General election 1900: Barkston Ash
Party	Candidate	Votes	%	±%
Conservative	Robert Gunter	Unopposed		
Conservative hold				

1905 Barkston Ash by-election
Party	Candidate	Votes	%	±%
Liberal	Joseph Andrews	4,376	51.3	New
Conservative	George Lane-Fox	4,148	48.7	N/A
Majority		228	2.6	N/A
Turnout		8,524	83.5	N/A
Registered electors		10,212		
Liberal gain from Conservative		Swing	N/A	

General election 1906: Barkston Ash
Party	Candidate	Votes	%	±%
Conservative	George Lane-Fox	4,894	53.5	N/A
Liberal	Joseph Andrews	4,246	46.5	N/A
Majority		548	7.0	N/A
Turnout		9,140	88.9	N/A
Registered electors		10,286		
Conservative hold		Swing	N/A	

=== Elections in the 1910s ===
General election January 1910: Barkston Ash
Party	Candidate	Votes	%	±%
Conservative	George Lane-Fox	5,299	53.9	+0.4
Liberal	Frederic Horne	4,540	46.1	−0.4
Majority		759	7.8	+0.8
Turnout		9,839	90.5	+1.6
Conservative hold		Swing	+0.4	

General election December 1910: Barkston Ash
Party	Candidate	Votes	%	±%
Conservative	George Lane-Fox	5,066	53.7	−0.2
Liberal	Frederic Horne	4,372	46.3	+0.2
Majority		694	7.4	−0.4
Turnout		9,433	86.8	−3.7
Conservative hold		Swing	−0.2	

General Election 1914–15:

Another General Election was required to take place before the end of 1915. The political parties had been making preparations for an election to take place and by July 1914, the following candidates had been selected;

- Unionist: George Lane-Fox
- Liberal:

General election 1918: Barkston Ash
Party		Candidate	Votes	%	±%
C	Unionist	George Lane-Fox	12,365	61.2	+7.5
	Liberal	John Albert Rhodes	6,809	33.7	−12.6
	Independent Labour	Dennis Milner	1,035	5.1	New
Majority			5,556	27.5	+20.1
Turnout			20,209	61.4	−25.4
Registered electors			32,919		
	Unionist hold		Swing	+10.1	
C indicates candidate endorsed by the coalition government.

=== Elections in the 1920s ===
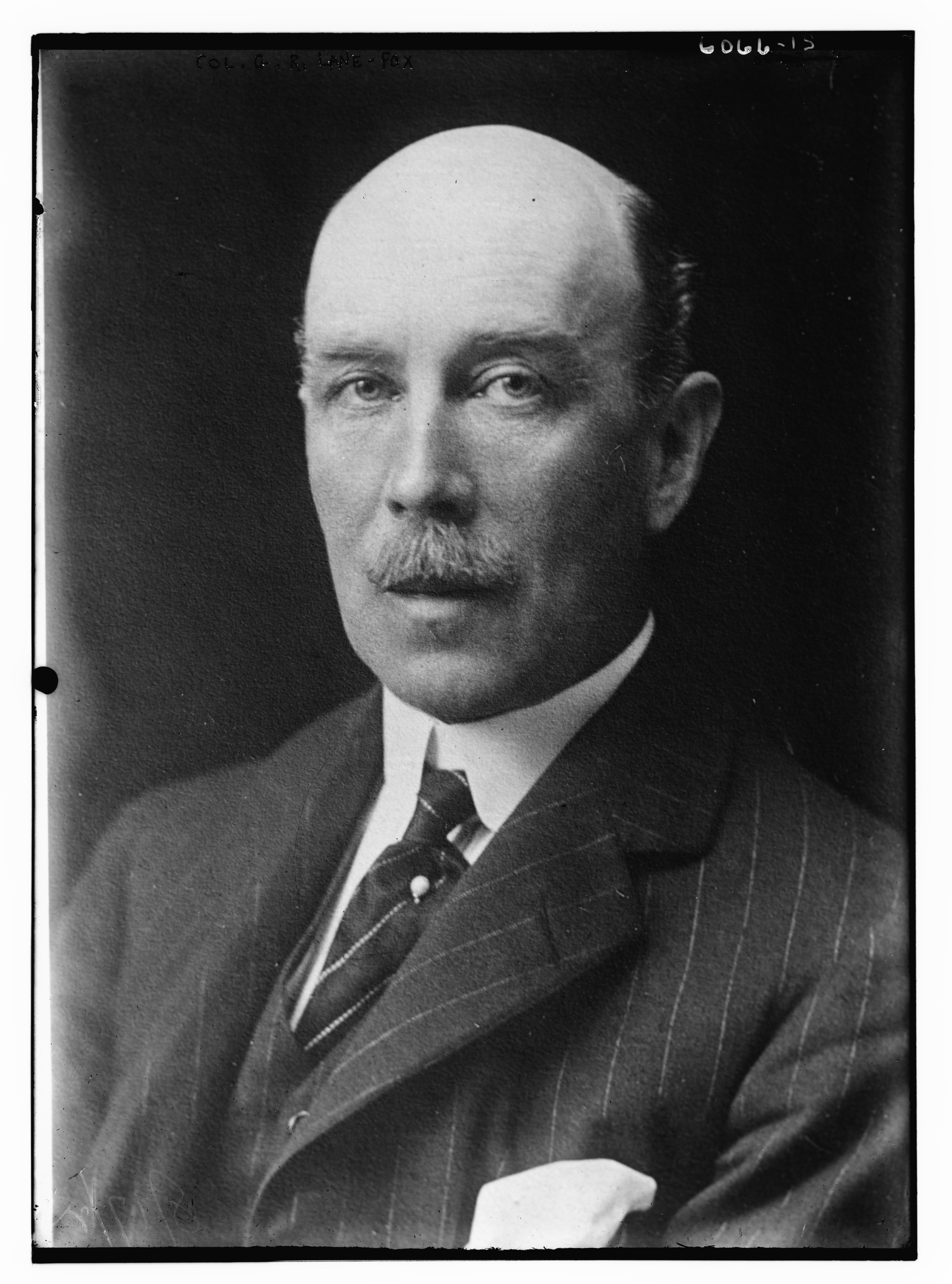
George Lane-Fox

General election 1922: Barkston Ash
Party	Candidate	Votes	%	±%
Unionist	George Lane-Fox	Unopposed		
Unionist hold				

General election 1923: Barkston Ash
Party	Candidate	Votes	%	±%
Unionist	George Lane-Fox	12,932	49.1	N/A
Labour	George Lewis Ward	7,964	30.3	New
Liberal	John Lambert	5,425	20.6	New
Majority		4,968	18.8	N/A
Turnout		26,321	76.1	N/A
Registered electors		34,604		
Unionist hold		Swing	N/A	

General election 1924: Barkston Ash
Party	Candidate	Votes	%	±%
Unionist	George Lane-Fox	16,817	58.6	+9.5
Labour	William Dobbie	11,894	41.4	+11.1
Majority		4,923	17.2	−1.6
Turnout		28,711	80.2	+4.1
Registered electors		35,792		
Unionist hold		Swing	−0.8	

General election 1929: Barkston Ash
Party	Candidate	Votes	%	±%
Unionist	George Lane-Fox	20,116	52.3	−6.3
Labour Co-op	George Woods	18,321	47.7	+6.3
Majority		1,795	4.6	−12.6
Turnout		38,437	80.2	0.0
Registered electors		47,940		
Unionist hold		Swing	−6.3	

=== Elections in the 1930s ===
General election 1931: Barkston Ash
Party	Candidate	Votes	%	±%
Conservative	Leonard Ropner	27,924	65.69	
Labour Co-op	George Woods	14,585	34.31	
Majority		13,339	31.38	
Turnout		42,509	84.37	
Conservative hold		Swing		

General election 1935: Barkston Ash
Party	Candidate	Votes	%	±%
Conservative	Leonard Ropner	25,714	60.88	
Labour Co-op	Frank Smithson	16,525	39.12	
Majority		9,189	21.76	
Turnout		42,239	78.54	
Conservative hold		Swing		

=== Election in the 1940s ===
General election 1945: Barkston Ash
Party	Candidate	Votes	%	±%
Conservative	Leonard Ropner	24,438	50.12	
Labour	Bertie Hazell	24,322	49.88	
Majority		116	0.24	
Turnout		48,760	75.56	
Conservative hold		Swing		

=== Elections in the 1950s ===
General election 1950: Barkston Ash
Party	Candidate	Votes	%	±%
Conservative	Leonard Ropner	25,199	57.50	
Labour	Bertie Hazell	18,626	42.50	
Majority		6,573	15.00	
Turnout		43,824	87.34	
Conservative hold		Swing		

General election 1951: Barkston Ash
Party	Candidate	Votes	%	±%
Conservative	Leonard Ropner	25,155	57.57	
Labour	Herbert Victor Wiseman	18,537	42.43	
Majority		6,618	15.14	
Turnout		43,692	85.05	
Conservative hold		Swing		

General election 1955: Barkston Ash
Party	Candidate	Votes	%	±%
Conservative	Leonard Ropner	24,194	57.30	
Labour	Geoffrey Rhodes	18,027	42.70	
Majority		6,167	14.60	
Turnout		42,221	81.09	
Conservative hold		Swing		

General election 1959: Barkston Ash
Party	Candidate	Votes	%	±%
Conservative	Leonard Ropner	26,200	58.42	
Labour	Robert W Bowes	18,647	41.58	
Majority		7,553	16.84	
Turnout		44,847	82.37	
Conservative hold		Swing		

=== Elections in the 1960s ===
General election 1964: Barkston Ash
Party	Candidate	Votes	%	±%
Conservative	Michael Alison	27,897	58.82	
Labour	Norman Holding	19,533	41.18	
Majority		8,364	17.64	
Turnout		47,430	81.43	
Conservative hold		Swing		

General election 1966: Barkston Ash
Party	Candidate	Votes	%	±%
Conservative	Michael Alison	28,183	56.34	
Labour	Stan Cohen	21,841	43.66	
Majority		6,342	12.68	
Turnout		50,024	79.85	
Conservative hold		Swing		

=== Elections in the 1970s ===
General election 1970: Barkston Ash
Party	Candidate	Votes	%	±%
Conservative	Michael Alison	35,198	59.6	+3.3
Labour	E. Keith Grime	23,861	40.4	−3.3
Majority		11,337	19.2	+6.5
Turnout		59,059	75.6	−4.2
Conservative hold		Swing	−3.3	

General election February 1974: Barkston Ash
Party	Candidate	Votes	%	±%
Conservative	Michael Alison	33,979	49.0	−10.6
Labour	John Muir	20,782	30.0	−10.4
Liberal	Duncan Paige	14,618	21.1	New
Majority		13,197	19.0	−0.2
Turnout		69,379	83.5	+7.9
Conservative hold		Swing	−0.1	

General election October 1974: Barkston Ash
Party	Candidate	Votes	%	±%
Conservative	Michael Alison	30,498	48.0	−1.0
Labour	John Muir	20,557	32.4	+2.4
Liberal	Duncan Paige	12,483	19.7	−1.4
Majority		9,941	15.6	−3.4
Turnout		63,538	75.8	−7.7
Conservative hold		Swing	−1.7	

General election 1979: Barkston Ash
Party	Candidate	Votes	%	±%
Conservative	Michael Alison	40,381	56.3	+8.3
Labour	John Muir	21,670	30.2	−2.2
Liberal	Philip Pughe-Morgan	7,909	11.0	−8.7
Ecology	David Corry	1,829	2.6	New
Majority		18,711	26.1	+10.5
Turnout		71,789	78.1	+2.3
Conservative hold		Swing	+5.3	

== See also ==
- List of parliamentary constituencies in North Yorkshire
- List of parliamentary constituencies in West Yorkshire
