= Robert Forrest (priest) =

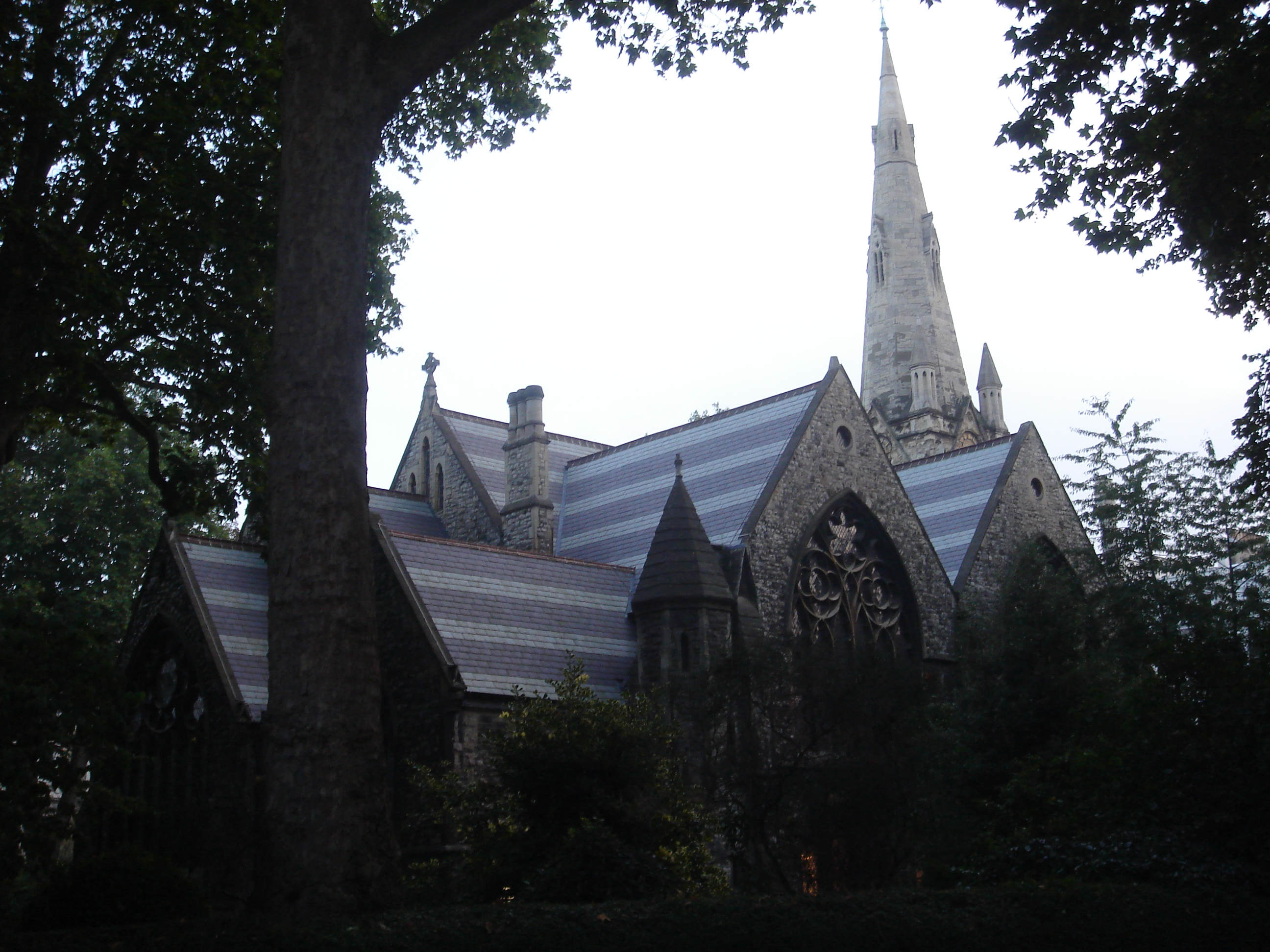
St Jude's Church, Kensington, London

Robert William Forrest (1831 – 6 July 1908) was the Dean of Worcester from 1891 until his death.

Forrest was born in Rostellan and educated at Trinity College Dublin and then began his ordained ministry as a curate at Holy Trinity, Dublin, after which he held incumbencies at Liverpool and St Jude's South Kensington. He was also a prebendary of St Paul's Cathedral and an Honorary Chaplain to Queen Victoria.

Religious titles
Preceded by John Gott	Dean of Worcester; 1891–1908	Succeeded by William Moore Ede
