= Redcliffe School =

Redcliffe Gardens School

Location
- 47 Redcliffe Gardens; London, SW10 9JH; England

Information
- Type: Private early years, pre-prep and prep day school
- Established: 1948
- Closed: 2023
- Local authority: Kensington and Chelsea
- Department for Education URN: 100507 Tables
- Gender: Mixed
- Age: 2.5 to 11
- Colours: Grey, Maroon, Cherry
- Website: www.redcliffegardens.com

Redcliffe Gardens School was a private school for girls and boys aged 2 1/2 to 11 located at two separate sites in Chelsea. The pre-prep was located in Redcliffe Square, the prep school was located in Redcliffe Gardens. From September 2020 until its closing, the school was part of the Godolphin and Latymer Foundation.

== History ==
Redcliffe School was founded in 1948 by Lady Dorothy May Edwards and from 1973 carried on by the charity Redcliffe School Trust Limited.

The school closed in July 2023.

== Alumni ==
- Daniel Radcliffe, actor.
- Actress Jemima Rooper also attended primary school here before leaving a year prior to her eleven plus examinations and then went to Godolphin Latymer School in Hammersmith.
- Actress Emerald Fennell, actress and director (Saltburn, 2023) the eldest daughter of the jewellery mogul Theo Fennell, attended primary school here.
