= Robert Gunter =

British Army officer

Gunter in 1895.

Sir Robert Gunter, 1st Baronet (2 November 1831 – 17 September 1905) was a British Army officer, property developer and Conservative Party politician who sat in the House of Commons from 1885 to 1905.

== Biography ==
Gunter was the son of Robert Gunter of Earl's Court, London and his wife Fanny Thompson, daughter of E. Thompson of Durham. His grandfather James Gunter was a confectioner of Gunter's Tea Shop whose purchases led to the development of some 60 acres of land in West London. Gunter was educated at Rugby School and joined the 4th Dragoon Guards. He served in the Crimean War and became captain. After the death of their father in 1852 Gunter and his brother James developed the Redcliffe Estate area, giving their name not just to "Gunter Grove", but to many other streets in the area. He settled in Yorkshire at Wetherby Grange in Collingham, near Knaresborough. He was a J.P. for the West Riding of Yorkshire, and Lieutenant-Colonel commanding the 3rd Battalion Princess of Wales's Own (Yorkshire Regiment).

Gunter was elected was Member of Parliament (MP) for Knaresborough in the West Riding of Yorkshire at a by-election in 1884 following the death of the sitting MP Thomas Collins. The Knaresborough constituency was abolished in the Redistribution of Seats Act 1885 . In the 1885 general election, Gunter was elected MP for the new Barkston Ash constituency. He represented the constituency until his death in 1905 at the age of 73.

He was granted the dignity of a baronet 18 April 1901, of Wetherby Grange, in the parish of Collingham, in the county of Yorkshire.

Gunter married Jane Marguerite Benyon, daughter of Thomas Benyon of Gledhow Hall, Yorkshire in 1862. A street in Chelsea called "Edith Grove" is named after their daughter, Edith, who died of scarlet fever aged eight.

== Arms ==
Coat of arms of Robert Gunter

Crest
A dexter gauntlet clenched fesswise Or surmounted by a stag's head erased Proper.

Escutcheon
Sable a chevron invected between two dexter gauntlets clenched in chief and a stag's head erased in base all Or.

Parliament of the United Kingdom
Preceded by Thomas Collins	Member of Parliament for Knaresborough; 1884–1885	Constituency abolished
New constituency	Member of Parliament for Barkston Ash; 1885–1905	Succeeded by Joseph Andrews
Baronetage of the United Kingdom
New creation	Baronet (of Wetherby Grange); 1901–1905	Succeeded by Robert Gunter
