= St Mary The Boltons =

Coordinates: 51.4892°N 0.1841°W

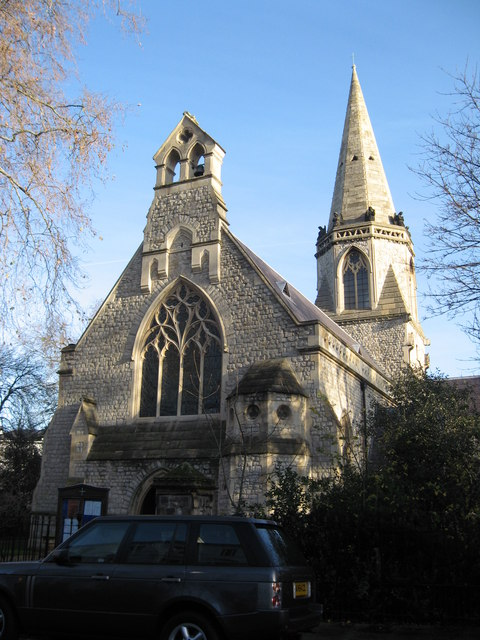
- St Mary The Boltons

- Location within London
- Location: Brompton, London
- Country: England
- Denomination: Church of England
- Churchmanship: Central
- Website: stmarytheboltons.org.uk

History
- Dedicated: 1850

Architecture
- Years built: 1849–50

Administration
- Diocese: London

Clergy
- Bishop: Bishop of Kensington
- Vicar: Revd Jenny Welsh

St Mary The Boltons is an Anglican church in The Boltons, Brompton, London. It is a Grade II listed building.

== History ==
The Boltons, a street in Brompton, was farmland until the middle of the 19th century. As part of westward expansion of London the land was developed by Robert Gunter the elder, who planned a residential estate, together with a church, to lend tone to the area. The church, built to a design by George Godwin the younger (who was also responsible for St Jude's, Courtfield Gardens, and St Luke's Church, Redcliffe Gardens) on land given by Gunter in the centre of the proposed development, was erected before the estate was built and was the first parish to be made out of the larger parish of Holy Trinity, Brompton, which since 1829 had covered much of Brompton. The cost of the church was £6,000 (equivalent to £700,000 in 2025), and the Church Building Commission gave a grant of £85 towards its construction. It was consecrated on 22 October 1850. The church's first incumbent, Rev. Hogarth J. Swale, met most of the building costs of the church. In July 2006 St Mary's Parish absorbed the parish of St Jude's, Courtfield Gardens, doubling its size.

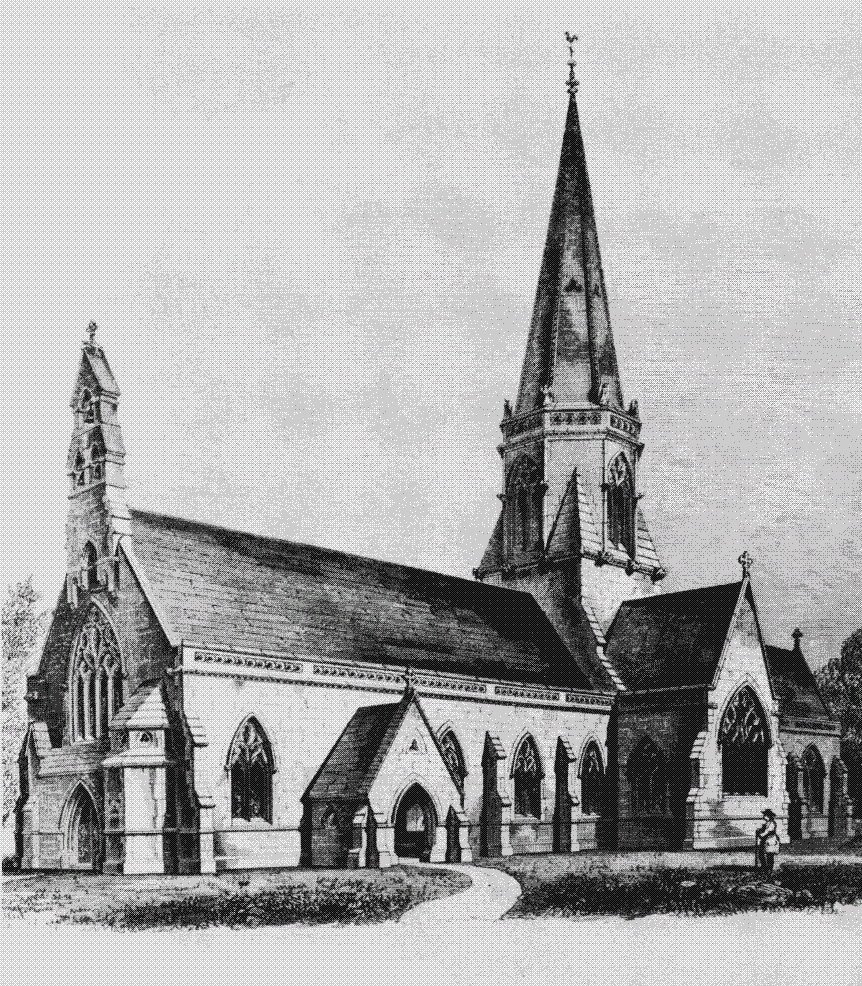
St Mary The Boltons as originally proposed before its construction in 1849–50

== Architecture ==
The church is stonebuilt, with Kentish rag capped with Bath stone externally and Hassock internally. The walls are now bare, but were once stencilled with designs of fruit and flowers. There were stained glass windows, but the windows are now plain. In 1854 the spire was erected and in 1902 the oak pews and floor tiling were installed. The roof and organ were damaged by German bombs during World War II, which shattered many windows. After the war the church was restored; the altar was moved to below the crossing and a new Lady Chapel was made from what was previously the sanctuary. The east window was made to a design by Margaret Kaye and installed in 1955. In 1960 the organ was moved to St Nicholas’s Church, Great Yarmouth. A new two-manual Compton organ was installed in the west end, and the west window was installed to diffuse the sunlight, ensuring that the organ stayed in tune.

== Graveyard ==
- Farnham Maxwell-Lyte (1828–1906), chemist and photographer

== Notable clergy ==
- W. Montgomery Watt, served his curacy here from 1939 to 1941; later became Professor of Arabic and Islamic Studies at the University of Edinburgh
- Geoff Davies, served his curacy here; later became a bishop in the Anglican Church of Southern Africa

== See also ==
- List of Commissioners' churches in London

== Bibliography ==
- Arthur Tait, (2004). St. Mary The Boltons: The Country Church in Kensington and Chelsea, Parochial Church Council of St Mary with St Peter, West Brompton. ISBN 0-9549173-0-8
