= Joseph Andrews (British politician) =

British politician (1873-1909)

Joseph Ormond Andrews (1873 – 26 January 1909) was a Liberal Party politician in the United Kingdom.

Andrews was educated at the Ripon Cathedral Choir School.

A barrister by profession, Andrews was called to the Bar at the Inner Temple in 1898 and practised on the North Eastern circuit. A Freemason, he was a member of the Zetland Lodge in Leeds. A keen sportsman, he was a follower of the Bramham Moor Hounds, and ran horses at the Wetherby Steeplechase.

Andrews was elected as member of parliament (MP) for Barkston Ash at a by-election in October 1905 following the death of Sir Robert Gunter, defeating the Conservative candidate George Lane-Fox by 228 votes. The seat had never been won by the Liberals before.

However, as Parliament was not sitting at the time, Andrews was unable to take his seat.

Andrews lost the seat only three months later at the 1906 general election to the Conservative Party candidate, again George Lane-Fox (later 1st Baron Bingley), losing by 548 votes. His defeat was one of the few Liberal losses at an election which saw the party win a landslide majority in the House of Commons. Andrews thus became one of the shortest-serving Members of Parliament, and one of only a handful never to take their seats.

Andrews died in 1909 at Boston Spa, Leeds, after two operations for appendicitis. He was 36 years old and left a widow and two children.

== See also ==
- List of United Kingdom MPs with the shortest service

Parliament of the United Kingdom
Preceded by Sir Robert Gunter	Member of Parliament for Barkston Ash; 1905–1906	Succeeded by George Lane-Fox
