= William Moore Ede =

Portrait by Walter Stoneman, c. 1916

William Moore Ede (31 August 1849 – 2 June 1935) was a Church of England priest.

Ede was educated at Marlborough Royal Free Grammar School and St John's College, Cambridge and ordained in 1873.

After an early appointment as superintendent lecturer for the Midland Counties he held incumbencies at Gateshead and, from September 1901, Whitburn. He became Dean of Worcester Cathedral in 1908, a post he held for 26 years. He died on 2 June 1935.

Ede wrote The attitude of the Church to some of the social problems of town life in 1896, which he dedicated to Professor Alfred Marshall, professor of economics at the University of Cambridge and the husband of the economist, Cambridge social reformer and Newnham College academic Mary Paley Marshall.

Church of England titles
Preceded by Robert Forrest	Dean of Worcester; 1908–1934	Succeeded by Arthur Davies
