= 1905 Barkston Ash by-election =

UK parliamentary by-election

- 13 October 1905
Candidate	Andrews	Lane-Fox
Party	Liberal	Conservative
Popular vote	4,376	4,148
Percentage	51.3%	48.7%
MP before election
Sir Robert Gunter
Conservative
Subsequent MP
Joseph Andrews
Liberal

The 1905 Barkston Ash by-election was a Parliamentary by-election held on 13 October 1905. The constituency returned one Member of Parliament (MP) to the House of Commons of the United Kingdom, elected by the first past the post voting system.

== Vacancy ==
The by-election was caused by the death, on 18 September 1905, of the sitting Conservative MP Sir Robert Gunter. Gunter had been seriously ill with neuritis and phlebitis since June 1905 and had been unconscious for several days before his death.

== Electoral history ==
Barkston Ash was a safe Tory seat. It had been represented by Gunter since it was created in 1885. Gunter had been unopposed at the 1900 general election and also in 1895. The last contest had come in 1892, with Gunter winning easily;

Robert Gunter

General election 1892: Barkston Ash
Party	Candidate	Votes	%	±%
Conservative	Robert Gunter	4,161	58.8	N/A
Liberal	Archibald William Scarr	2,920	41.2	New
Majority		1,241	17.6	N/A
Turnout		7.081	76.0	N/A
Conservative hold		Swing	N/A	

== Candidates ==
=== Conservatives ===
Because of ill health, Gunter had told his local party in 1903, that he would be standing down as MP. They had then selected 35 year old George Lane-Fox, an Eton and Oxford educated barrister and a member of the West Riding County Council to be their candidate.

=== Liberals ===
The Liberals had already selected 32 year old Joseph Andrews, a barrister from Leeds to fight the next general election. They adopted Andrews as their by-election candidate.

=== Other ===
There was speculation that an independent candidate, Henry Liversidge, would also stand. Earlier in 1905 he announced an intention to contest the next election as a Lib-Lab candidate, but on the platform of tariff reform. It was subsequently reported that no Tariff Reform League or other candidate would be standing specifically on that issue.

== Campaign ==
The political tide seemed to be flowing against the Tory government of Arthur Balfour. In 1903 they had lost five seats in by-elections, in 1904 another seven and six seats had been gained by the Liberals in by-elections so far in 1905.

=== Tariff Reform ===
Although no tariff candidate entered the field, the issue of protectionism was one of the great issues of the day. Whereas the question of Irish Home Rule had dominated political debate in earlier elections, the ‘dumping’ of foreign goods on British markets and the struggle between tariff reformers and free traders was now seen as a prime election battleground. The Free Trade Union, founded in 1903 to safeguard the free import of food and raw materials and oppose the policy of protection as a barrier to good relations within the British Empire had acquired a reputation for intelligent and effective electioneering on behalf of Liberal candidates and had moved some key organisers into the Barkston Ash constituency to offer support to Andrews and to campaign and produce literature and posters for him. The Liberals played the Free Trade card for all it was worth.

=== Agricultural labour ===
There was a strong mining community in the south of the constituency which traditionally supported the Liberals and a substantial suburban house-holder vote spreading out from Leeds, which together with the farmers and landowners could usually be relied upon to vote Conservative. This meant the agricultural labourers held the key to the result. Both candidates courted the votes of the rural worker, Andrews emphasising the value of Free Trade in keeping food prices cheap whereas Lane-Fox appealed to the traditional conservatism of rural people.

=== Religion ===
Both candidates also, despite denials were keen to attract votes from the sizeable Roman Catholic minority in the area. The Liberals denounced the Education Act 1902 and hoped for Catholic voters to be sympathetic to Irish Home Rule in support of their co-religionists in Ireland although as the campaign wore on they became vulnerable to attack on the administration of the Education Act by the Liberal controlled West Riding County Council. The Tories looked to the well-established local Catholic community to remain true to their family traditions and support the Conservative establishment.

=== Foreign affairs ===
Government policy abroad gave the Liberals little to campaign on. There was a distinct strain of English patriotism in the Yorkshire character and the area had provided strong support over the fighting of the Boer War. The only area left to exploit was the introduction of Chinese labour into South Africa gold mining operations and the allegation that so-called coolies were being forced to work under conditions no better than those of slaves.

== Result ==
The result of the by-election was announced the following day in front of the Selby Museum. The Liberals gained Barkston Ash from the Conservatives by a majority of 228 votes.

Barkston Ash by-election, 1905
Party	Candidate	Votes	%	±%
Liberal	Joseph Andrews	4,376	51.3	New
Conservative	George Lane-Fox	4,148	48.7	N/A
Majority		228	2.6	N/A
Turnout		8,524	83.5	N/A
Liberal gain from Conservative		Swing	N/A	

Irish Nationalist MP T. P. O'Connor called the election "a victory for Ireland" because "of the firmness with which (voters) refused to Abandon Ireland" and "have buried the infamous attempt to weaken Ireland by a Redistribution Bill." It was another indication of how the electorate across the country, even in such a traditional Tory constituency, had grown tired of the Conservative government which had been in office for ten years. It was this swing of the pendulum, rather than the specific policy issues or personalities of the candidates, which was responsible for the Liberal victory – although the question of tariff reform was clearly an influential element in the result and the campaigning efforts of the Free Trade Union played their part in stimulating the electorate and getting them to the polls in greater numbers than their opponents.

== Aftermath ==
Despite the 1906 Liberal landslide Lane-Fox was returned to parliament three months later and the constituency remained in Tory hands thereafter.

General election 1906: Barkston Ash
Party	Candidate	Votes	%	±%
Conservative	George Lane-Fox	4,894	53.5	+4.8
Liberal	Joseph Andrews	4,246	46.5	−4.8
Majority		548	7.0	N/A
Turnout		9,140	88.9	+5.4
Conservative gain from Liberal		Swing	+4.8	

As the Commons were not sitting at the time of the by-election, Andrews was one of the few people in history to be elected to parliament but never to take their seat.

== See also ==
- List of United Kingdom by-elections
- United Kingdom by-election records
