= Francis Routh =

English composer and author (1927–2021)

Francis John Routh (5 January 1927 – 27 November 2021) was an English composer and author.

== Education ==
Born in Kidderminster, Routh attended Malvern College and Harrow School before serving in the Royal Naval Volunteer Reserve (1945–48). He read Classics at King's College, Cambridge (where he also learned the organ) and from 1951 studied at the Royal Academy of Music for two years with William Alwyn (for piano) and Wesley Roberts (organ). After that he took private composition lessons with Mátyás Seiber.

== Composer, teacher, author ==
Routh first came to notice as a composer in the early 1960s with the song cycles A Woman Young and Old (Yeats, 1962) and Four Shakespeare Songs (1963), using a chromatic, but still tonal style. Instrumental (especially organ music) and orchestral works followed, including the massive Sacred Tetralogy for organ, composed between 1959 and 1974, as well as numerous concertos, such as the Violin Concerto (1965), Double Concerto (1970) and Cello Concerto (1973).

In all there are some 85 published works spanning 60 years, including three symphonies, chamber music, large scale solo piano and organ works and several song cycles. Late works included The Well Tempered Pianist, 24 preludes for piano (2009), performed and recorded by Charles Matthews, and the Symphony No 3 (2010–12), which incorporates and develops material from some of his previous compositions. It remains unperformed.

Routh taught music at Morley College from 1971. He was editor of the magazine Composer (1980–87). As an author he has published Playing the Organ (1958), Contemporary Music: an Introduction (1968), Contemporary British Music (1945–1970) (1972), and Stravinsky (1975).

Routh died aged 94, on 27 November 2021. A funeral service at St Peter's Church, Hammersmith, was followed by committal at Mortlake Crematorium.

== Redcliffe Concerts ==
With some colleagues from the Royal Academy, Routh began organising informal performances of new music during the 1950s. These took place in St Luke’s Church, Redcliffe Square, and (between 1957 and 1961) they evolved into the Redcliffe Festival. Out of this activity came the Redcliffe Concerts of British Music series, founded in 1963, with concerts held at the Arts Council, 4 St James's Square, moving to the Queen Elizabeth Hall and Purcell Room in 1967. The series, supported by the Greater London Council, continued for 22 years until 1989.

A notable example was one of the earliest concerts of electronic music by British composers to be held in Britain, featuring the music of Tristram Cary, Delia Derbyshire, George Newson, Daphne Oram and Peter Zinovieff, at the Queen Elizabeth Hall on 15 January 1968. The 21st Anniversary Series in the Autumn of 1985 included four concerts surveying The Tippett Generation - Constant Lambert, Alan Rawsthorne and Michael Tippett.

In 1989 Redcliffe Records was formed for recordings, and Redcliffe Publishing for scores. Routh promoted composers such as Alan Bush, Alan Rawsthorne, Priaulx Rainier, Graham Whettam and Samuel Wesley, as well as his own music. He revised and edited the works of Wesley for performance.

== Selected works ==
=== Orchestral and concertante ===
- Violin Concerto, Op. 7 (1965)
- Double Concerto, Op. 19 (1970)
- Symphony No 1, Op. 26 (1973)
- Cello Concerto, Op. 27 (1973)
- Piano Concerto, Op. 32 (1976)
- Scenes for Orchestra No 1, Op. 36 (1982)
- Oboe Concerto, Op. 46 (1984)
- Poème fantastique, Op. 48 for piano and orchestra (1988)
- Scenes for Orchestra No 2, Op. 65 (1996)
- Symphony No 2 (2003)
- Symphony No 3 (2010–12)

=== Chamber and instrumental ===
- Dance Suite, Op. 13, for string quartet (1967, also orchestrated)
- Piano Quartet, Op. 22 (1971)
- Cello Sonata No 1, Op. 31 (1972)
- Mosaics, Op. 31, for two violins (1976)
- Oboe Quartet, Op. 34 (1977)
- Concerto for Ensemble 1, Op. 41 (1981)
- Concerto for Ensemble 2, Op. 44 (1983)
- Dance Interludes, Op. 46 for flute and guitar (1985)
- Concerto for Ensemble III, Op. 55 (1991)
- Violin Sonata, Op. 58 (1992)
- Clarinet Quintet, Op. 61 (1994)
- Cello Sonata No 2 (1999)
- Symphonic Variations for clarinet and piano (2003_

=== Organ ===
- Fantasia 1, Op. 2 (1956)
- The Manger Throne, Op. 3 (1960) – A Sacred Tetralogy 1
- Sonatina, Op. 9 (1965)
- Fantasia 2, Op. 14 (1965)
- Lumen Christi, Op. 15 (1968) – A Sacred Tetralogy 2
- Aeterne Rex Altissime, Op. 20 (1970) – A Sacred Tetralogy 3
- An English Organ Book (1972)
- Gloria tibi Trinitas, Op. 29 (1974) – A Sacred Tetralogy 4
- Four Marian Antiphons, Op. 50 (1989)
- Exultet coelum laudibus, Op. 63 (1994)

=== Solo piano ===
- Little Suite, Op. 28 (1974)
- Scenes 1 (1979)
- Ballade, Op. 42 (1982)
- Elegy (1986)
- Scenes 2 ‘Touraine’, Op. 56 (1996)
- Scenes 3, Op. 64 (1996)
- Scenes 4, ‘Bretagne’, Op. 68 (1998)
- Scenes 5, 'Sonata Festiva' (2000)
- Rondo Capriccio (2003)
- The Well-Tempered Pianist, 24 Preludes Op. 77 (2009)

=== Vocal and choral ===
- Balulalow, Op. 1 (1955), SATB choir
- A Woman Young and Old (Yeats), Op. 4 (1962)
- Four Shakespeare Songs, Op. 5 (1963)
- Songs of Farewell, Op. 8 (1965)
- Songs of Lawrence Durrell, Op. 10 (1966)
- Spring Night, concert aria, Op. 23 (1971)
- The Death of Iphigenia (Aeschylus, from Gilbert Murray's translation of the Oresteia), Op. 25 (1972)
- At the round earth’s imagined corners, SATB choir (1970s)
- Vocalise, Op. 38 (1979)
- Songs of Dachine Rainer, Op. 40 (1979)
- Cantate Domino, Op. 60 (1993)
- Shakespeare Songs, Op. 57 (1993)
