= Redcliffe Square =

Square in Kensington, London, England

Coordinates: 51°29′18″N 0°11′19″W

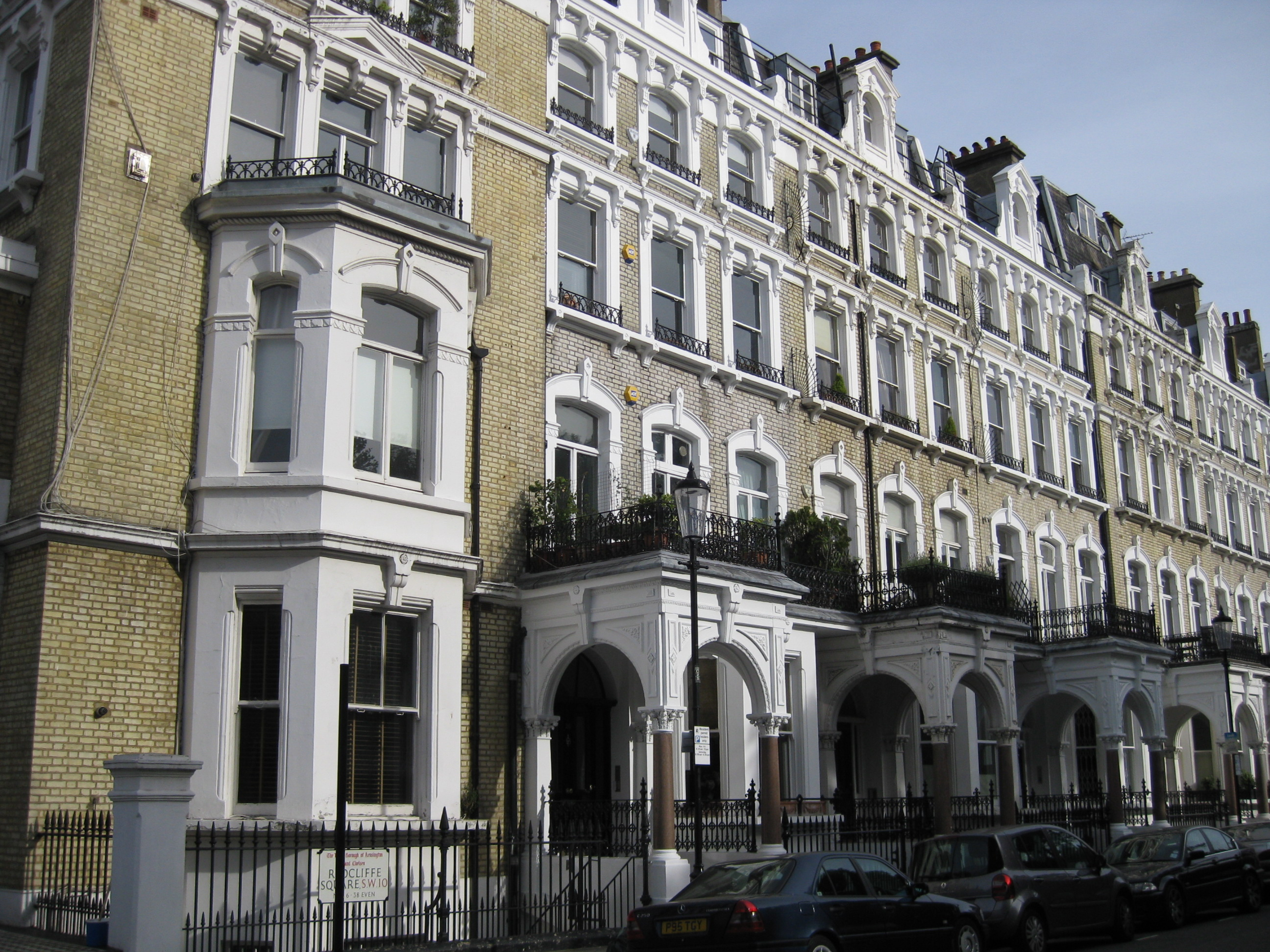
Houses on Redcliffe Square

Redcliffe Square is a town square located in the Brompton area of the Royal Borough of Kensington and Chelsea, southwest of central London, (postcode SW10). Redcliffe Square Gardens are located in the square. The development was part of the vast Gunter estate, during 1864–1878.

Redcliffe Gardens runs northwest–southeast through the square. To the east is The Boltons. To the southwest is Brompton Cemetery.

The square is home to St Luke's Church, Redcliffe Gardens and Redcliffe School's early years and pre-prep school.

== History ==
A map showing the Redcliffe ward of Kensington Metropolitan Borough as it appeared in 1916.

Redcliffe Square was built as part of the Gunter estate in the 1860s. The area was dominated by farmland prior to building development and Redcliffe Gardens used to be one of the old routes through the area, called Walnut Tree Walk, until the estate was laid out. Robert Gunter initiated most of the development of the estate, and much of the design was by his surveyor George Godwin working with his brother Henry. The name Redcliffe was chosen due to Godwin's connections with St Mary Redcliffe in Bristol.

This square was given to the Borough for free in 1949, providing its character was maintained.

On 18 December 1966, the socialite and Guinness heir Tara Browne crashed his car at the junction of Redcliffe Square and Redcliffe Gardens after driving through a red traffic light. The incident was later immortalised in The Beatles' song A Day in the Life.
