= The Boltons =

Garden square in London's Brompton district

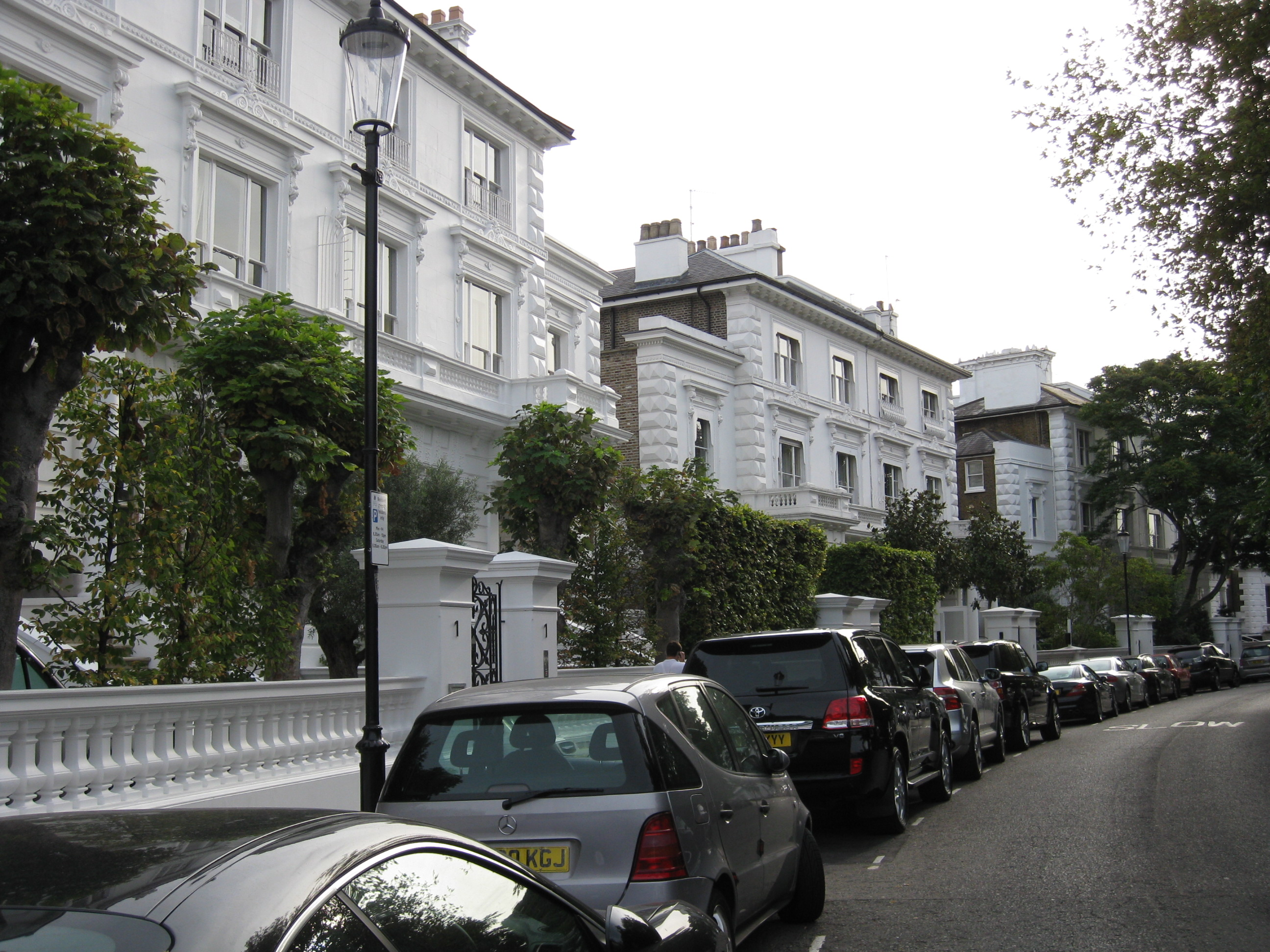
- Houses on the west crescent
- Interactive map of The Boltons
- Namesake: William Bolton
- Location: Brompton, Kensington, London, England
- Postal code: SW10
- Coordinates: 51°29′21″N 0°11′03″W
- From: Boltons Place
- To: Gilston Road
- North: Old Brompton Road
- East: Drayton Gardens
- South: Fulham Road
- West: The Little Boltons; Redcliffe Square; Redcliffe Gardens

Construction
- Completed: Mid-19th century

Other
- Designer: George Godwin

The Boltons is a street and garden square of lens shape in the Brompton district of the Royal Borough of Kensington and Chelsea, London, England (postcode SW10). The opposing sides of the street face the communal gardens (as two non-semicircular crescents) with large expansive houses and gardens, in what is considered the second most expensive street in the country with an average house price of £23.1m. The elliptical central gardens of the Boltons are Grade II listed on the Register of Historic Parks and Gardens.

== History ==
The Boltons was built in the middle of the 19th century by architect and journalist George Godwin on land which was originally market gardens.

The area is believed to have been named after William Bolton (or Boulton) who bought land in the area in 1795. Twelve years later Bolton sold the land between the Old Brompton Road and the Fulham Road to the confectioner James Gunter. Gunter died in 1819 and his son Robert inherited the estate. He added lands and began to lease parcels for housebuilding. The area is within The Boltons Conservation Area set up in 1970 by the local authority. Additionally, much of the appeal comes from the fact it is located in the area colloquially known as The Beach.

== Layout ==
To the northwest via Boltons Place is Old Brompton Road and to the southeast via Gilston Road is Fulham Road. To the west are (The) Little Boltons, Redcliffe Square and Redcliffe Gardens.

St Mary The Boltons church interrupts the garden, consecrated on 22 October 1850, the spire of which was added in 1854. The interior was rearranged in 1872 and in 1952. Its modest two-storey hall was attached in 1965–6.

Some of the houses were converted to flats; others were adapted for institutional use. For much of the 20th century, numbers 20 and 21 served as Our Lady's convent, which was run by the Franciscan Missionaries of Mary, together with a girls' hostel next door.

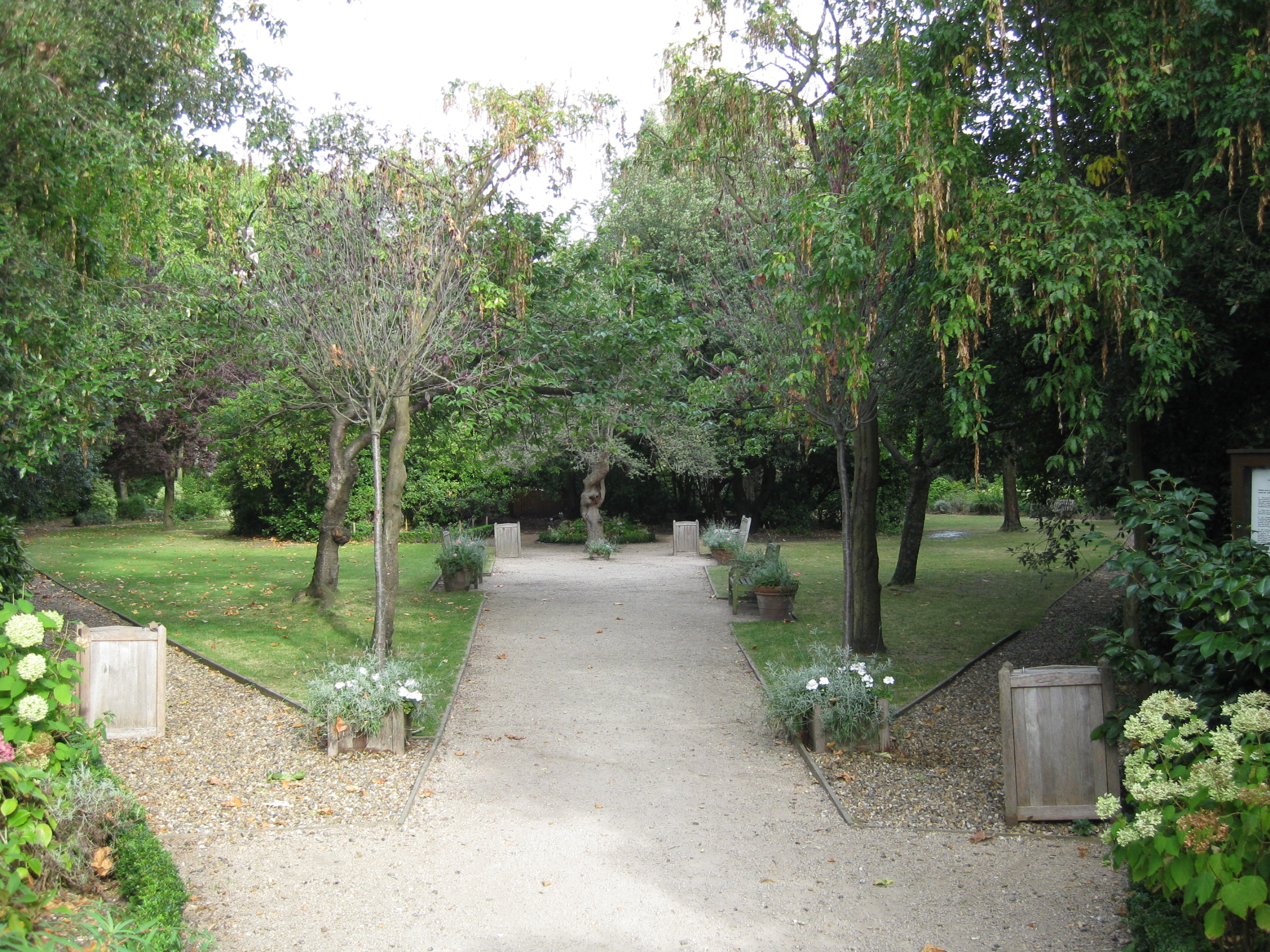
The private communal gardens at the centre of the Boltons

For 15 years after World War II, "going to the Boltons" meant to locals going to school. On either side of Boltons Place were two schools: Virgo Fidelis RC Junior Girls School and state primary Bousfield School, which remains. 29 The Boltons, on the junction of Tregunter and Gilston Roads, housed the infants' reception and two primary classes with a garden play area, as part of the nearby Lycée Français de Londres. As the main school in South Kensington expanded in the late 1950s, its location consolidated and name changed to Lycée Français Charles de Gaulle. Many properties have retained, or been returned to, their original purpose as single family houses.

== Notable residents ==
American actor Douglas Fairbanks Jr lived at 28 The Boltons in the 1950s. Novelist and disgraced former politician Jeffrey Archer lived at number 24a in the 1970s. Sir Julian Ridsdale (politician) and Dame Paddy Ridsdale (ex-secretary to Ian Fleming and reportedly his inspiration for Miss Moneypenny in the James Bond novels) lived in The Boltons, with their family still residing there. The lyricist W. S. Gilbert (of Gilbert and Sullivan fame) lived in The Boltons in the 1870s and 1880s.

Between 1999 and 2006 the singer Madonna owned a house in The Boltons. The actor-manager Otho Stuart lived at No. 14. The Swedish opera singer Jenny Lind lived in Boltons Place in the 19th century. Benjamin Golding lived at 28 The Boltons.
