= Redcliffe Gardens =

Street in Chelsea, London

Coordinates: 51°29′11″N 0°11′15″W

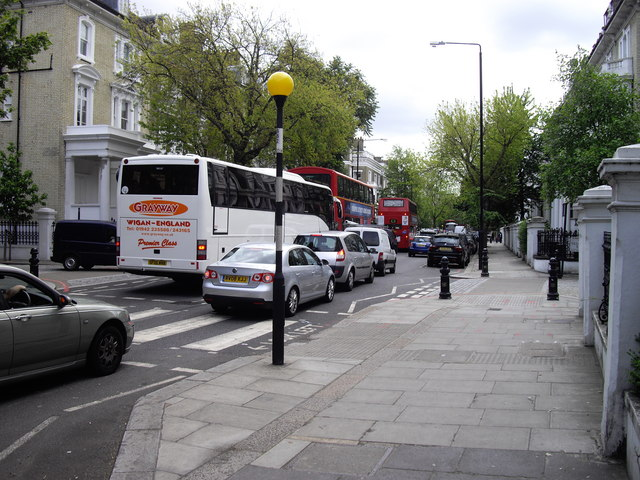
Redcliffe Gardens

Redcliffe Gardens is a primary road, the A3220 located in the Chelsea area of southwest central London, England (postcode SW10). It was a development dated from 1864 to 1878.

Redcliffe Gardens runs southeast through Redcliffe Square as part of a one-way traffic system centred on Earl's Court. To the east is The Boltons. It runs parallel to the Finborough Road taking traffic north through a junction with Lillie Road (left), and Old Brompton Road (right), where it continues into Warwick Road, Earl's Court. At its southeast end, Redcliffe Gardens meets Fulham Road, with Edith Grove directly ahead. To the southwest is Brompton Cemetery.

The street was previously home to Redcliffe School's prep school.

Tara Browne, the man "who blew his mind out in a car" in The Beatles lyrics of "A Day in the Life", died in a car accident on 18 December 1966 in Redcliffe Gardens.

== Notable residents ==
This is a list of notable residents and former residents of Redcliffe Gardens:

- Sydney Monckton Copeman (1862–1947), at 57 Redcliffe Gardens, Chelsea.
