= Gunter's Tea Shop =

Tea shop in London, United Kingdom

Coordinates: 51.509502°N 0.144457°E

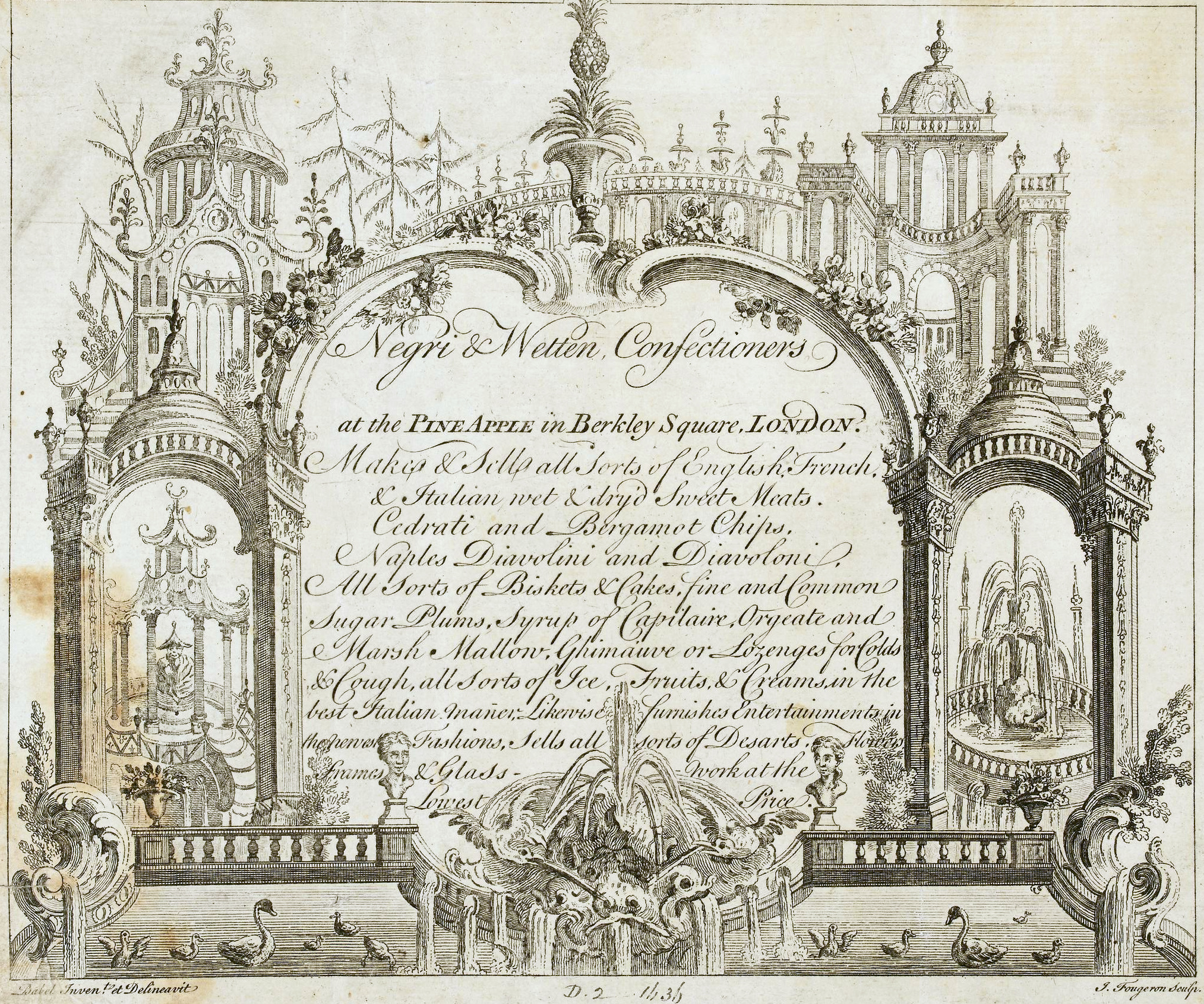
Trade card for the Pot and Pine Apple, 1760

Gunter's Tea Shop was an establishment in London's Berkeley Square. It had its origins in a food business named "Pot and Pine Apple" started in 1757 by Italian Domenico Negri. Various English, French and Italian wet and dry sweetmeats were made and sold from the business. In 1777, James Gunter became Negri's business partner, and by 1799 he was the sole proprietor.

In the nineteenth and twentieth centuries Gunter's became a fashionable light eatery in Mayfair, notable for its ices and sorbets. In 1815, James sent his son Robert (1783–1852) to study the confectionery trade in Paris. Robert assumed sole control of the business following his father's death in 1819, and took on his cousin John as a partner in 1837.

Along with Bolland's of Chester and W G Buszard, Gunter's was considered to be the wedding cake makers du jour and in 1889, made the bride cake for the marriage of Queen Victoria's granddaughter, Princess Louise of Wales.

The policewoman Barbara Bell describes Gunter's in the 1930s as a place where she could pick up wealthy lesbian women for affairs, saying, "I never did, but I had plenty of opportunity. The little waitress would come over and say, 'The lady over there— would you like to join her for tea at her table?'"

Gunter's was located at Nos. 7–8 Berkeley Square. When the east side of the square was demolished in 1936–7, it moved to Curzon Street. The tea shop closed in 1956, although the catering business continued for another twenty years.

== In popular culture ==
In Georgette Heyer's Regency Romance novels, Gunter's were mentioned frequently as the suppliers of refreshments and wines to the main characters' households.

Mary Elizabeth Braddon eulogised Gunter's in chapter III of her 1863 novel Aurora Floyd.

In Mary Seacole's autobiography she states that even Gunter would have envied her reputation for the sponge cakes that she provided for the British army besieging Sebastopol in the Crimean War.

Gunter's is the eponymous meeting place in Pamela Haines' 1974 novel 'Tea at Gunter's'.

The shop is also the setting for a brief scene in Bernard Cornwell's novel Gallows Thief, taking place in 1817.

The cafe appears to be referenced in Graham Greene’s novel The End of the Affair, in the 2-shilling expense line item that the private eye Parkis submits to Bendrix. “The coffee place was more expensive than I cared for,” Parkis explains, “but it was the least I could take without drawing attention.”

In Patrick O'Brian's The Letter of Marque, Gunter's staff were hired for a private dinner party by Sir Joseph Blaine, head of British intelligence, who was particularly keen to impress his guests.

In the first episode of the television series The House of Eliott, the protagonists -- two sisters who, in 1920, have lost their seemingly affluent father and whose solicitor has told them that they'll be comfortably off -- have tea at Gunter's.
