= George Godwin =

British architect, journalist and editor

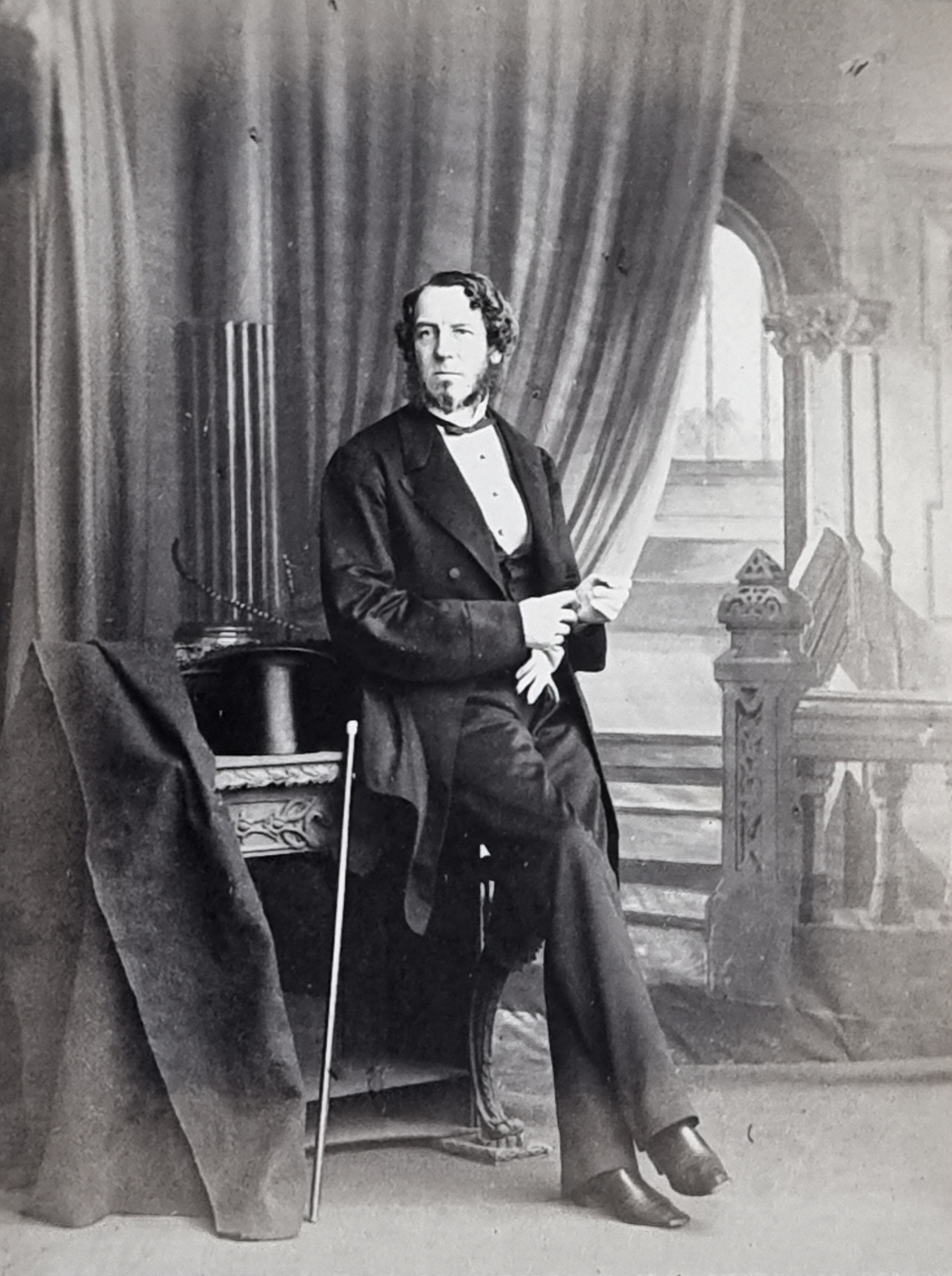
- George Godwin, c. 1863
- Born: 28 January 1813; Kensington, London, England
- Died: 27 January 1888 (aged 74); Kensington, London, England
- Occupations: architect, journalist, and editor
- Known for: architect, journalist, and editor of The Builder
- Title: FRS

George Godwin FRS (28 January 1813 – 27 January 1888) was a British architect, journalist, and editor of The Builder magazine.

== Life ==
He was one of nine children of the architect George Godwin senior (1780–1863) and trained at his father's architectural practice in Kensington, where he set up in business with his brother Henry (1831–1917).

Encouraged by his friend the antiquary John Britton, he pursued an interest in architectural history and wrote several volumes on The Churches of London (1839), mason's marks and Gothic Revival style. He was also interested in new materials, and wrote on the use of concrete (1836). He soon joined the Institute of British Architects and the Society of Antiquaries, and became a Fellow of the Royal Society. He was a co-founder of the Royal Architectural Museum in 1851.

== The Builder ==
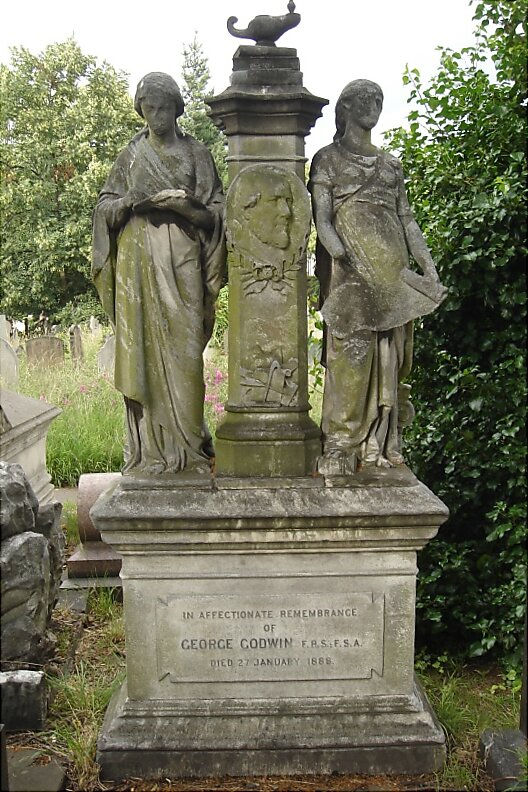
Godwins's funerary monument, Brompton Cemetery, London

The Builder was first published as a weekly magazine in 1842 by Joseph Hansom, inventor of the Hansom cab. In 1844 Godwin became its third editor and immediately expanded its scope and coverage beyond new works and architectural issues to include history, archaeology, arts, sanitation and social issues. It described itself as 'An illustrated weekly magazine for the architect, engineer, constructor, sanitary reformer, and art lover'.

This broadened its appeal beyond the construction trade, and he took a campaigning stance to improve the circumstances of the working classes. Godwin wrote on slums and republished edited collections of his articles as reforming books. In addition to self-improvement, he promoted the use of public baths, wash-houses, charitable housing trusts, and pavilion-styled hospitals.

In 1881, he set up the Godwin Bursary which was administered by the Royal Institute of British Architects. This yearly competitive prize was to enable young British architects to study modern techniques of construction outside of Great Britain. Winners were encouraged to spend at least five weeks within a country of their choice, and then to submit reports on what they learnt. The first five winners all went to the United States.

He edited the magazine until 1883. It was renamed Building in 1966, and is still published.

== Other works ==
Throughout his editorship he worked in the family architectural practice. His works included churches, housing and public buildings, amongst them Redcliffe Square, Kensington; The Boltons, Kensington; St Mary's, The Boltons; Elm Park Gardens, Chelsea; St Luke's, Kensington; and the restorations of St Mary Redcliffe, Bristol, and St Mary's, Ware. He was largely responsible for the design of large areas of South Kensington and Earl's Court, including five public houses—among them the Finborough Arms, now the Finborough Theatre.

Godwin was retained as district surveyor for south Islington between 1853 and 1874.

In 1884, he reported to the Royal Commission that was producing recommendations for improving working-class housing.

He also wrote plays, and co-founded the Art Union of London.

== Death ==
Godwin died on 27 January 1888 at Kensington, and is buried in Brompton Cemetery. He lies to the east side of the main path, between the north entrance and the colonnades. Although set back behind other monuments, his memorial is easily spotted due to its unique design; containing a portrait medallion, and being topped by the mourning figures of Faith and Charity, it is Grade II listed. His extensive art collection was sold at Christie's, London, on 12 April 1888; it numbered 98 lots.

== Sources ==
- G. B. Smith Godwin, George (1813–1888) Oxford Dictionary of National Biography
- City of London Information Leaflet No 22 George Godwin & The Builder
