= List of prehistoric structures in Great Britain =

There are many prehistoric sites and structures of interest remaining from prehistoric Britain, spanning the Stone Age, Bronze Age and Iron Age. Among the most important are the Wiltshire sites around Stonehenge and Avebury, which are designated as a World Heritage Site.

== Structures and sites ==
=== Agricultural structures, mines and roads ===
- Bathampton Down, Iron Age earth enclosure with Bronze Age round barrows in the area.
- Bindon Hill, Iron Age earth enclosure.
- Great Orme, Bronze Age copper mines and an Iron Age hill fort.
- Grime's Graves, Neolithic flint mining complex.
- The Ridgeway, ancient trackway.
- Sweet Track, ancient causeway.
- Tarr Steps, late Bronze Age clapper bridge.

=== Burial structures ===
- Arthur's Stone, Herefordshire, Neolithic chambered tomb.
- Barclodiad y Gawres, Neolithic cruciform passage grave.
- Belas Knap, Neolithic long barrow.
- Bryn Celli Ddu, Bronze Age passage grave on the site of a Neolithic stone circle and henge.
- Clava cairn, Bronze Age circular chamber tomb cairn.
- Devil's Lapful, Neolithic long cairn in Northumberland.
- Duggleby Howe, round barrow.
- Dartmoor kistvaens, burial tombs or cists found in Dartmoor in Devon.
- Fairy Toot, oval barrow.
- Five Marys, group of round barrows in Dorset.
- Julliberrie's Grave, unchambered earthen Neolithic long barrow.
- King's Quoit, Neolithic burial chamber in Pembrokeshire.
- Lanyon Quoit, dolmen.
- Lugbury Long Barrow, Neolithic burial mound in Wiltshire.
- Maeshowe, Neolithic chambered cairn and passage grave.
- Oakley Down Barrow Cemetery, group of round barrows in Dorset.
- Pentre Ifan, Neolithic dolmen.
- The Poind and his Man, burial mound and standing stone in Northumberland.
- Poor Lot Barrow Cemetery, group of round barrows in Dorset.
- Seven Barrows, site of bowl barrows, bell barrows, saucer barrows and disc barrows.
- Spinsters' Rock, Neolithic dolmen.
- St Lythans, Neolithic dolmen.
- Stoney Littleton Long Barrow, Neolithic chambered tomb.
- Thickthorn Down Long Barrows, Neolithic long barrows in Dorset.
- Three Brothers of Grugith, Neolithic dolmen in Cornwall.
- Tinkinswood, Neolithic dolmen.
- Trethevy Quoit, Neolithic burial chamber.
- Wayland's Smithy, Neolithic long barrow and chamber tomb.
- West Kennet Long Barrow, Neolithic chambered long barrow.
- Wor Barrow, Neolithic long barrow in Dorset.

=== Causewayed enclosures ===
- Barkhale Camp, West Sussex
- Coombe Hill
- Flagstones Enclosure, Dorset
- Hembury
- Robin Hood's Ball
- Stonehenge
- Windmill Hill
- Whitesheet Hill, Wiltshire

=== Fortifications ===
==== Hill forts ====
- Badbury Rings, Iron Age hill fort.
- Barbury Castle, Iron Age hill fort.
- Bat's Castle, Iron Age hill fort.
- Beacon Hill, late Bronze Age hill fort.
- Berry Castle, Iron Age hill fort
- Black Ball Camp, Iron Age hill fort
- Blackbury Camp, Iron Age hill fort.
- Blacker's Hill, Iron Age hill fort.
- Brean Down, Iron Age hill fort.
- Brent Knoll, Iron Age hill fort.
- Burledge Hill, Iron Age hill fort.
- Bury Castle, Iron Age hill fort.
- Cadbury Camp, Iron Age hill fort.
- Cadbury Castle, Iron Age hill fort.
- Cadbury Hill, Iron Age hill fort.
- Cannington Camp, Bronze and Iron Age hill fort
- Castell Dinas Brân, Iron Age hill fort.
- Castell Henllys, Iron Age hill fort.
- Castle an Dinas, Iron Age hill fort.
- Castle Hill, Iron Age hill fort.
- Castle Old Fort, Stonnall, Iron Age hill fort.
- Clatworthy Camp, Iron Age hill fort.
- Coney's Castle, Iron Age hill fort.
- Cow Castle, Iron Age hill fort.
- Danebury, Iron Age hill fort.
- Daw's Castle, Iron Age hill fort.
- Devil's Dyke, Iron Age defensive ditch.
- Dinas Dinlle, Iron Age hill fort.
- Dolebury Warren, Iron Age hill fort.
- Dowsborough, Iron Age hill fort.
- Dumbarton Castle, Iron Age stronghold.
- Dunadd, Iron Age hill fort.
- Dundon Hill (or Dundon Camp), Compton Dundon, Iron Age hill fort.
- Durnovaria, Iron Age hill fort.
- Eildon Hill, Late Bronze Age hill fort.
- Eggardon Hill, Iron Age hill fort.
- Ham Hill, Bronze and Iron Age hill fort
- Hambledon Hill, Iron Age hill fort and Neolithic causewayed enclosures.
- Hod Hill, Iron Age hill fort.
- Kenwalch's Castle, Iron Age hill fort.
- Kingsdown Camp, Iron Age hill fort.
- Lambert's Castle, Iron Age hill fort.
- Maes Knoll, Iron Age hill fort.
- Maesbury Castle, Iron Age hill fort.
- Maiden Castle, Iron Age hill fort.
- Norton Camp, Bronze Age hill fort
- Old Sarum, Iron Age hill fort and Neolithic settlement.
- Old Winchester Hill, Iron Age hill fort and Bronze Age barrows.
- Oram's Arbour, Iron Age hill fort.
- Pen Dinas, Iron Age hill fort.
- Pilsdon Pen, Iron Age hill fort.
- Plainsfield Camp, Iron Age hill fort.
- Poundbury Hill, Iron Age hill fort and Middle Bronze Age settlement.
- Ruborough Camp, Iron Age hill fort.
- Segsbury Camp, Iron Age hill fort.
- Sharpenhoe Clappers, Iron Age hill fort.
- Small Down Knoll, Bronze Age hill fort
- Solsbury Hill, Iron Age hill fort.
- Stantonbury Camp, Iron Age hill fort.
- Stanwick Iron Age Fortifications, Iron Age hill fort.
- Sweetworthy, Iron Age hill fort.
- Traprain Law, Iron Age hill fort.
- Trendle Ring, Iron Age hill fort.
- Tre'r Ceiri, Iron Age hill fort.
- Uffington Castle, Iron Age hill fort.
- White Castle, Iron Age hill fort.
- Wincobank, Iron Age hill fort.
- Worlebury Camp, Worlebury Hill, Iron Age hill fort.

==== Other defensive structures ====
- Broch of Mousa, broch.
- Dun Carloway, broch.
- Edin's Hall Broch, broch.
- Eilean Dòmhnuill, crannog.
- Wansdyke

=== Henges ===
- Arbor Low, late Neolithic Class II henge.
- Avebury, Neolithic henge and stone circles.
- Ballymeanoch, Neolithic henge with a small burial cairn as well as standing stones and stone circles.
- The Bull Ring, Neolithic Class II henge.
- Catholme ceremonial complex, Neolithic henge enclosure, timber circle and pit alignments
- Castle Dykes Henge, Neolithic Class I henge.
- Drove Cottage Henge, Heavily damaged Neolithic henge
- Durrington Walls, Neolithic Class II henge.
- King Arthur's Round Table, Neolithic Class II henge.
- Maumbury Rings, Neolithic henge later used as a Roman amphitheatre.
- Mayburgh Henge, Neolithic henge with standing stones.
- Priddy Circles, four stone circles and two round barrows
- Ring of Brodgar, Neolithic henge and stone circle.
- Thornborough Henges, three aligned Neolithic henges.
- Waulud's Bank, a possible Neolithic henge.
- Woodhenge, Neolithic Class I henge and timber circle.

=== Hill figures ===
- Long Man of Wilmington, hill figure of uncertain age, but probably not prehistoric.
- Uffington White Horse, Bronze Age hill figure.

=== Settlement sites ===
- Carn Brea, Cornwall
- Cheddar Gorge and its caves, forming part of the Cheddar Complex
- Chysauster Ancient Village, Cornwall
- Din Lligwy, Anglesey
- Flag Fen, Cambridgeshire
- Glastonbury Lake Village
- Harrow Hill, West Sussex
- Huckhoe Settlement, Northumberland
- Lismore Fields, Derbyshire
- Little Woodbury, Wiltshire
- Martin Down Enclosure, Hampshire
- Morgan's Hill Enclosure, Wiltshire
- Rotherley Down Settlement, Wiltshire
- The Sanctuary, Wiltshire
- Shaftoe Crags Settlement, Northumberland
- Skara Brae, Orkney
- Shearplace Hill Enclosure, Dorset
- Shipton Hill Settlement, Dorset
- Slate Hill Settlement, Northumberland
- Smedmore Hill Settlement, Dorset
- South Lodge Camp, Wiltshire
- Thundersbarrow Hill, West Sussex
- Woodcutts Settlement, Dorset

=== Stone monuments ===
- Achavanich
- Beckhampton Avenue
- Bennachie
- Birkrigg stone circle
- Boscawen-Un
- Boskednan stone circle
- The Bridestones
- Callanish Stones
- Castlerigg stone circle
- Doll Tor
- Drizzlecombe
- Grey Wethers
- The Hurlers
- Long Meg and Her Daughters
- The Longstones
- Mên-an-Tol
- The Merry Maidens
- Merrivale
- Mitchell's Fold
- Nine Ladies
- Rollright Stones
- Rudston (Rudston Monolith)
- Stalldown Barrow
- Standing Stones of Stenness
- Stanton Drew
- Stones of Scotland
- Swinside
- Temple Wood
- Threestoneburn Stone Circle
- Torhouse
- Tregeseal East stone circle
- Yellowmead stone circle

=== Structures of unknown purpose ===
- Grim's Ditch, bank and ditch earthworks.
- Seahenge, Bronze Age timber monument.
- Silbury Hill, the tallest prehistoric man-made mound in Europe.
- The Gop, Neolithic mound in Wales.
- Stonehenge, large area of stone circles

== See also ==
- Prehistoric Scotland
- Prehistoric Wales
