= Winkelbury Camp =

Archaeological site in Berwick St John, Wiltshire, England

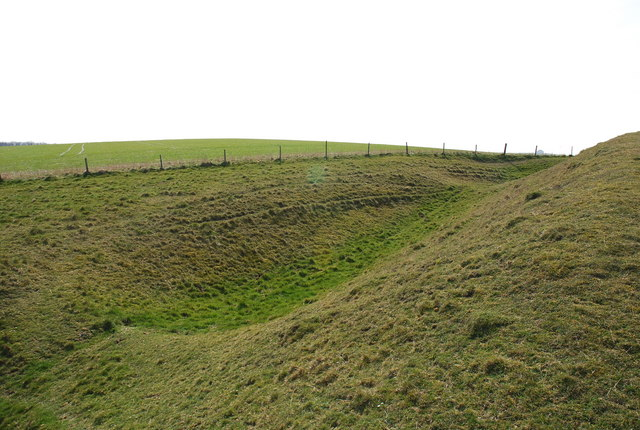
- Bank and ditch of the hillfort

- Location within Wiltshire
- 50°59′40″N 2°4′10″W
- Type: Hillfort
- Periods: Iron Age; Romano-British
- Location: Near Berwick St John, Wiltshire, England
- OS grid reference: ST 952 217

Scheduled monument
- Designated: 9 August 1923
- Reference no.: 1005702

Winkelbury Camp is an Iron Age hillfort, a short distance south-east of the village of Berwick St John, in Wiltshire, England. It is a scheduled monument.

== Description ==
The fort is on the northern spur of Winkelbury Hill. A single rampart bank forming a rough oval, 382 by 160 metres (1,253 by 525 ft), encloses an area of about 7.5 hectares (19 acres). The bank is up to 2.5 metres (8 ft 2 in) high, with an outer ditch up to 2 metres (6 ft 7 in) deep and 4 metres (13 ft) wide. There are various hollows within the fort, which are interpreted as indications of buildings and pits for storage or refuse.

Augustus Pitt Rivers, inheritor of the Rushmore Estate at Tollard Royal, where he was resident from 1880, investigated many prehistoric monuments on Cranborne Chase. He made a partial excavation of Winkelbury Camp from 1881 to 1882, finding the remains of a timber hut with wattle-and-daub walls; there were flint tools, and pottery from the Romano-British period. It was established that there were at least two occupation periods, probably in the early and late Iron Age.

The banks of the fort and the accompanying ditches appear to have been built as a series of separate lengths. Field work by R Feachem in 1971 led to a supposition that there were three phases of building, all incomplete, the irregular construction perhaps being the result of gang work. The earliest part was two unaligned banks in the south with a central gap; the banks on the west and east were constructed later; and the last phase was the building of a curved bank across the interior to create a small oval area of about 3 hectares (7.4 acres) at the north end. It has been suggested that the purpose of the camp was not just military: it was constructed according to the changing circumstances around the site over time.

== Excavations by Pitt Rivers ==
Other archaeological sites on Cranborne Chase excavated by Pitt Rivers include the Martin Down Enclosure, Rotherley Down Settlement, South Lodge Camp, Woodcutts Settlement and Wor Barrow.

== See also ==
- Hillforts in Britain
