= Berwick St John =

Village in Wiltshire, England

Coordinates: 51.000°N 2.077°W

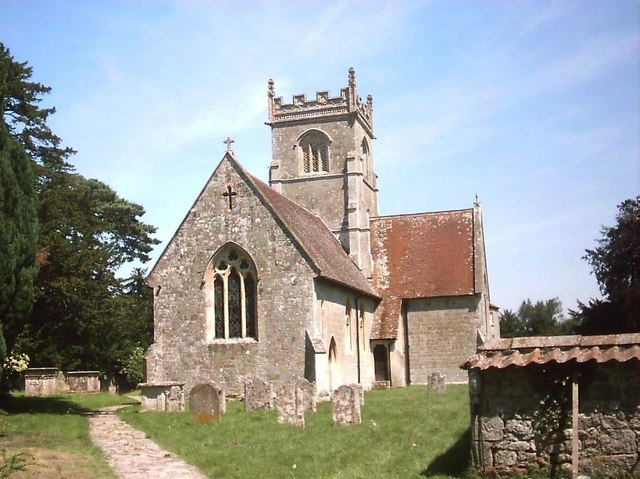
- St John the Baptist parish church

- Location within Wiltshire
- Population: 426 (in 2021)
- OS grid reference: ST947223
- Civil parish: Berwick St John
- Unitary authority: Wiltshire
- Ceremonial county: Wiltshire
- Region: South West
- Country: England
- Sovereign state: United Kingdom
- Post town: Shaftesbury
- Postcode district: SP7
- Dialling code: 01747
- Police: Wiltshire
- Fire: Dorset and Wiltshire
- Ambulance: South Western
- UK Parliament: Salisbury
- Website: Parish Council

Berwick St John is a village and civil parish in southwest Wiltshire, England, about 5 miles (8 km) east of Shaftesbury in Dorset. The parish includes the Ashcombe Park estate, part of the Ferne Park estate, and most of Rushmore Park (since 1939 the home of Sandroyd School).

== Geography ==
The parish is at the head of the Ebble valley, in the Cranborne Chase Area of Outstanding Natural Beauty. The village lies on a minor road between Donhead St Mary and Alvediston. The Ox Drove, a medieval drovers' road from Dorset to Salisbury, crosses the parish from west to east about a mile south of the village; most of its route survives as a track.

Winklebury Hill overlooks the village. In the extreme west of the parish, Win Green hill, at 277 metres (909 ft), is the highest point of Cranborne Chase. The southern part of the parish is forested and includes a golf course.

== Demography ==
The parish population at the 2021 census was 426. In 1861 residents numbered a maximal 499 but this had fallen to a low of 258 at the 1971 census.

== History ==
The area has several prehistoric sites. Winklebury (or Winkelbury) Camp, on a spur of the hill south-east of the village, is a hillfort some 6 hectares (15 acres) in area, protected by a bank and ditch, with evidence of occupation in the Bronze Age, Iron Age and the Romano-British period. In the south of the parish are a Bronze Age settlement known as South Lodge Camp, and a late Iron Age and Romano-British settlement at Rotherley Down.

The name Berwick derives from the Old English berewīc meaning 'barley farm'.

Part of Wilton Abbey's Chalke estate from the 10th century, the parish was established by the 13th century. Soon after the Dissolution, Berwick St John manor was bought by Sir William Herbert (from 1551 earl of Pembroke). His grandson sold it in 1608 to Robert Cecil, 1st Earl of Salisbury, and in turn his grandson sold it in 1671 to Baron Ashley (from 1672 earl of Shaftesbury), whose descendant the 5th Earl sold the manor in two parts in 1792. The lordship and land including 750 acres of woodland in the south-east around Rushmore House were bought by George Pitt, 1st Baron Rivers; the estate was held by the Barons Rivers until 1880, when it was inherited from the 6th Baron by his cousin Augustus Henry Lane-Fox who took the additional surname Pitt-Rivers. He was a noted ethnologist and archaeologist, who excavated many local sites. In 1984 the estate remained in Pitt-Rivers ownership.

A farm in the second part of the 1792 sale was bought by a tenant, then from c.1842 became part of the Ferne House estate. The Wiltshire Victoria County History traces the ownership of other estates at Bridmore, Upton Lucy and Ashcombe.

The Old Rectory, close to the church, dates from 1798 with additions in the next century.

== Religious sites ==
There was a church at Berwick St John by the early 13th century, linked to Wilton Abbey and (for part of the next century) Shaftesbury Abbey. The rectors acquired farmland and woodland, partly in exchange for tithes; in 1783 there were 50 acres of arable and meadow, and after relinquishing 19 acres of woodland in 1829 the rector held 55 acres. These landholdings were sold in 1930.

The Church of England parish church of St John the Baptist is cruciform with a tower over the crossing. It was built in the 14th century but heavily restored in 1861 under the direction of the Gothic Revival architect Henry Woodyer; the nave was lengthened and the tower re-erected. Stained glass windows from the same period are by Hardman & Co. The building is Grade II listed.

The tower has a ring of six bells. Robert I Wells of Aldbourne cast the second, third and tenor bells in 1767. Robert II Wells cast the fifth bell in 1788. John Warner & Sons of Cripplegate, London cast the treble and fourth bells in 1885. Some 220 graves in the churchyard have been catalogued.

St John's parish is a member of the Chalke Valley benefice.

Ebenezer Baptist Chapel was built in 1828 and closed in 1984. A Wesleyan Methodist chapel was built in 1875 and closed sometime before 1964.

== Amenities ==
The village has a pub, the Talbot Inn, which dates from the mid-17th century.

There is no primary school. A school which was built in 1835 took children of all ages until 1935; it was closed in 1963. Sandroyd School, at Rushmore House, is an independent preparatory and pre-preparatory school for children aged 2–13.

Land at Win Green was bought by the National Trust in 1937; they provide a small car-park and describe the site as a "prominent landmark with fine views".

Winklebury Hill is a Site of Special Scientific Interest; other sites lie partly within the parish at Pincombe Down, Rotherley Downs and Win Green Down. The Cranborne Chase SSSI includes Chase Woods, in the southeast of the parish.

== Notable residents ==
John Priaulx, rector in the 17th century, went on to become Archdeacon of Sarum. Other notable rectors include Peregrine Bingham from 1817, biographer and poet.

Charlotte Grove (1773–1860), known for the diary she kept for much of her adult life, was the daughter of Thomas Grove of Ferne House and became the wife of the rector.

Lieutenant General Sir Robert Jeremy "Robin" Ross, Commandant General Royal Marines from 1994 to 1996, has lived in the village since at least 2007, and in 2011 was a churchwarden.
