= Charlotte Grove =

British diarist

Charlotte Grove (later Downes, c. 1773–1860) was an English diarist. Her diaries describe daily life of a rector's wife in the mid nineteenth century, poverty in the era, and local issues in Berwick St John, Wiltshire.

== Biography ==
Grove was born in 1773 and was the first child and eldest daughter of Thomas Grove, a landowner of Ferne House, Donhead St Andrew, Wiltshire, by his marriage to Charlotte Grove (née Pilfold). She had ten siblings and the family was raised at Ferne House. Her sister Harriet Grove became known as the "first love" of their cousin, the poet Percy Bysshe Shelley.

In 1827, at the age of 44, Grove married the new rector of Berwick St John, Richard Downes. She had been expected to remain single, as her sisters all married young.

== Diary ==
Grove kept a diary from 1811 until her death, although some years have not survived. The surviving original diaries are held at the Wiltshire and Swindon History Centre in Chippenham. The diaries share her daily life as a rector's wife in the mid nineteenth-century (including the books she read, charity work, her expenses, letter writing, parlour games, walks, and visits to friends and the church), her views on Catholicism, and a list of sermons which she attended.

Her diaries also describe the poverty in her era. They record penny clubs, which were "a community effort to accumulate funds for bulk purchasing of coal and cloth for distribution amongst the locals." Her 10 February 1837 entry reads:

"Slight rain. We went to see some of our parishioners. The new poor law acts badly with labourers in sickness, they have no wages, nor any remedy in lieu of it. William Crowther very ill with 4 young children."

Grove's diaries cover local issues such as opposition to the railway, and the West Country riots.

Edited diary entries are included in The Grove Diaries, which also features the diaries of three other members of the Grove family, including her sister Harriet (years 1809–1810) and much later, Agnes Geraldine Grove, daughter of Augustus Henry Lane-Fox Pitt Rivers and a friend of Thomas Hardy. Two volumes of transcriptions of the diaries were published in 2007 and 2013.
