= Tollard Royal =

Village in Wiltshire, England

Coordinates: 50.960°N 2.081°W

- St Peter ad Vincula parish church

- Location within Wiltshire
- Population: 115 (2011)
- OS grid reference: ST9417
- Civil parish: Tollard Royal
- Unitary authority: Wiltshire
- Ceremonial county: Wiltshire
- Region: South West
- Country: England
- Sovereign state: United Kingdom
- Post town: Salisbury
- Postcode district: SP5
- Dialling code: 01725
- Police: Wiltshire
- Fire: Dorset and Wiltshire
- Ambulance: South Western
- UK Parliament: Salisbury
- Website: tollardroyal.org

Tollard Royal is a village and civil parish on Cranborne Chase, Wiltshire, England. The parish is on Wiltshire's southern boundary with Dorset and the village is 6 miles (10 km) southeast of the Dorset town of Shaftesbury, on the B3081 road between Shaftesbury and Sixpenny Handley.

== History ==
Evidence of prehistoric occupation in the area includes a bowl barrow, reduced by ploughing, in the west of the parish on Woodley Down. Nearby is a linear earthwork straddling the county border, which is truncated by the Roman road from Badbury to Bath; a separate 480m section of the road survives as earthworks, with the flint road surface visible in places. On Berwick Down in the north of the parish a late Iron Age farmstead was replaced by a Romano-British settlement.

Domesday Book in 1086 recorded 31 households at Tollard. Much of the land was owned by Aiulf, whose other estates included Farnham in Dorset, immediately to the south. This was later reflected in the shape of the ancient parish, with land on both sides of the Wiltshire/Dorset border. The land in Dorset – including the hamlet of Tollard Farnham, and much of Farnham village but not its church – was merged in 1885 into Farnham civil parish.

The 'Royal' suffix came into use in the 16th century, possibly because King John was overlord of part of the manor. The parish population peaked in the later 19th century, with 384 recorded at the 1871 census. Numbers fell to 280 by 1881, then declined for most of the 20th century, reaching a low of 92 at the 1981 census.

=== Landowners ===
Landowners included Sir Edward Bayntun (d. 1544), Sir James Stumpe (d. 1563) and Sir Matthew Arundell (d. 1598), whose son Thomas was created Baron Arundell of Wardour in 1605. The Tollard estate continued in the Arundell family until circa 1819, when the 10th Baron sold most of the Wiltshire land to George Pitt, 2nd Baron Rivers (d. 1828). It passed to his nephew, the notorious gambler Horace Beckford, who then took the surname Pitt-Rivers. On the death in 1880 of his son, also Horace, the 27,000-acre (11,000 ha) estate was inherited by a cousin, Augustus Lane-Fox, who also adopted the Pitt Rivers name.

Augustus Pitt Rivers had a long military career, retiring in 1882 with the rank of Lt General. By then he was already known as an ethnologist and antiquarian, and among the first scientific archaeologists; from the mid-1880s he investigated sites around the estate, including those at Rotherley Down, South Lodge and Woodcutts. His ethnological collections form the basis of Oxford's Pitt Rivers Museum, and The Salisbury Museum has a collection of his archaeological material.

The estate descended in the Pitt-Rivers family until the death in 1999 of Michael Pitt-Rivers, then passed to his partner William Gronow-Davis (d. 2015).

== Religious sites ==
=== Parish church ===
The earliest known record of the Church of England parish church of St. Peter ad Vincula dates from 1291. Early English style features that survive from this time include the tower arch, a doorway and several windows, including two in the nave. The bell tower was built after a gift of £10 for the purpose in 1412.

The earliest record of the church's dedication to St. Peter ad Vincula ("St Peter in Chains") dates from 1469. It is one of only 15 churches in England with this dedication, which is after the Basilica of San Pietro in Vincoli in Rome.

Late in the 15th and early in the 16th centuries extensive Perpendicular Gothic alterations were made to the church. The tower was rebuilt and the south porch and three-bay north aisle were added and the nave was increased in height.

A west gallery was added in 1714 and later removed, probably during rebuilding work in the 1850s. The works included rebuilding the north aisle, removing the chancel arch and blocking up the east window, causing Pevsner to describe the church as "much renewed". In 1966 the church was designated as Grade II* listed. Today the parish is part of the Chase Benefice, a group of nine on both sides of the Dorset/Wiltshire border.

In 1553 the church had three bells and a sanctus bell. One was recast by William Tosier of Salisbury in 1728 and another by Mears and Stainbank in 1882, but the third mediaeval bell still hung in the tower in 1927. Two more bells were cast by Mears and Stainbank and added to the tower in 1889. In 1999 the three Mears and Stainbank bells and the mediaeval bell were replaced with a ring of six bells cast by the Whitechapel Bell Foundry. The 1728 bell has not been recast but it is no longer rung. The sanctus bell has also been retained; it was cast in Salisbury in about 1400.

=== Methodists ===
The parish had a Methodist congregation by 1773, and for several decades the Methodists worshipped in private homes licensed for the purpose. In 1879 a Primitive Methodist chapel was built of brick; it was closed in 1957.

== King John's House ==
The large house known as King John's House, just south of the church, which is a former manor house and later a farmhouse, has at its core a 13th-century hall house. Remodelling in the 16th and 17th centuries added wings, in part timber-framed. Augustus Pitt Rivers restored and extended the house, and opened it to the public around 1890 as a museum, but by 1907 it was again a residence. Pevsner describes the house as "memorable".

The house was designated as Grade II* listed in 1966, and is operated by the Rushmore Estate as a holiday let and a base for events such as weddings.

== Amenities ==
Tollard Royal has a public house, the King John Inn.

Sandroyd School, an independent junior school, is near the village at Rushmore House. The nearest state schools are at Ludwell and Shaftesbury, the village's 19th-century National School having closed in 1962.

Rotherley Downs, a biological Site of Special Scientific Interest, is partly within the parish.

== Larmer Tree Gardens ==
Augustus Pitt Rivers, army officer and founder of modern archaeology, created a pleasure garden in 1880 within part of his Rushmore Estate to the south of Tollard Royal; the first private garden to be opened for public enjoyment in the United Kingdom. Following restoration in the 1990s, the Grade II* listed gardens are open to the public and are used for weddings and other events. The annual Larmer Tree Festival of music and arts has been held there since 1990, and the End of the Road music festival since 2006.

== Ashcombe Estate ==
Ashcombe House and its 1,134 acres (459 ha) estate lies between Tollard Royal and Berwick St John, in Berwick parish. Photographer and designer Cecil Beaton lived there between 1930 and 1945; it was bought by entertainer Madonna and her then husband Guy Ritchie in 2002, and transferred to Ritchie in 2009 as part of their divorce settlement.

== Notable people ==
William Thorne (d. 1630), Regius Professor of Hebrew at Oxford, was rector from 1601.

Vere Temple (1898–1980), wildlife artist and entomologist, lived at Tollard Royal for some time around 1951.
