= Flowerdown =

Flowerdown can refer to:

- Flowerdown Barrows, an ancient site in Hampshire, England
- RAF Flowerdown, a Royal Air Force station in Hampshire, England
