= Sandroyd School =

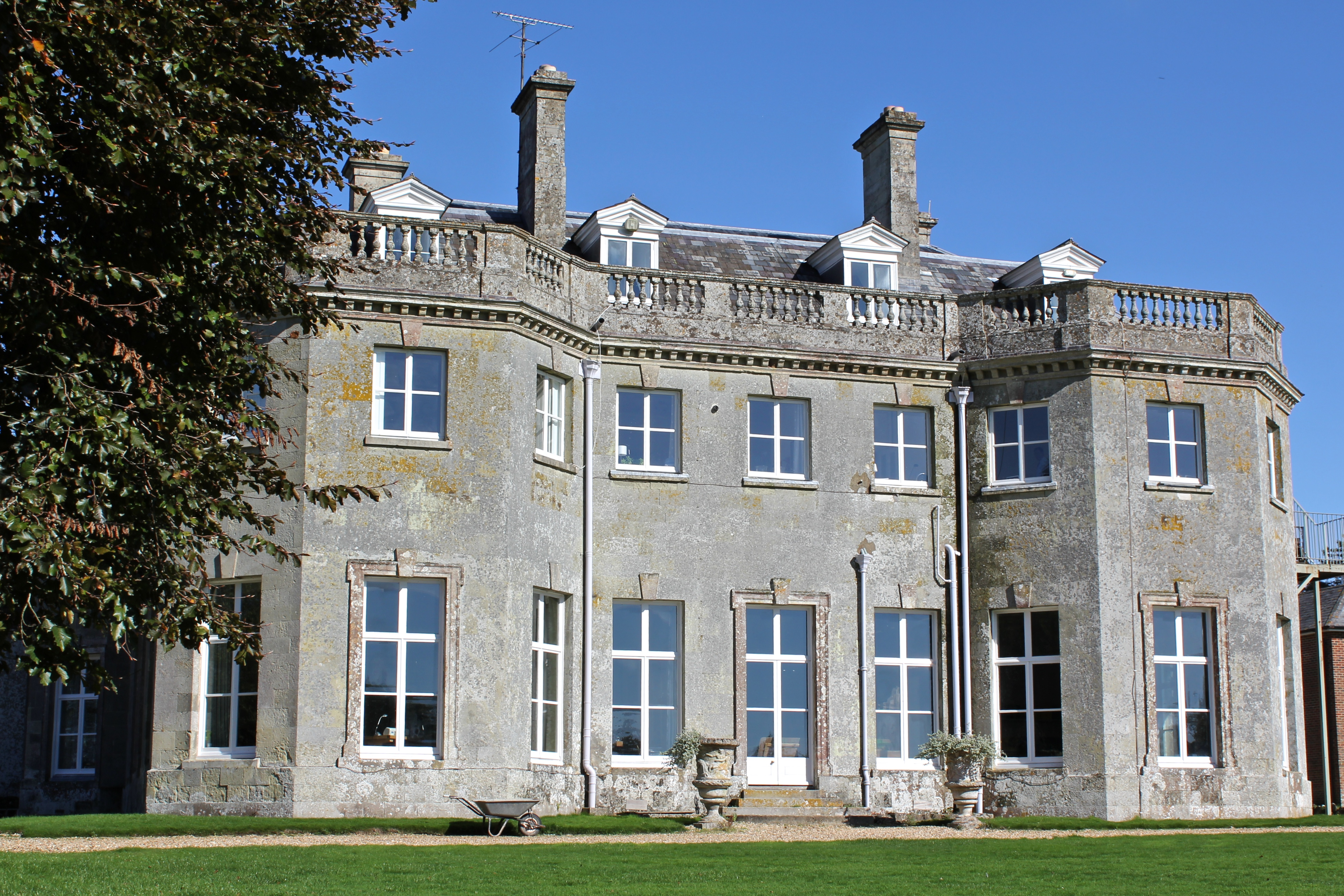
- Main building

Location
- Rushmore Park; Tollard Royal, Wiltshire, SP5 5QD; England -2.0673 type:edu_region:GB 50.9652°N 2.0675°W

Information
- Type: Independent school Co-educational; Day and boarding school
- Motto: Niti Est Nitere (Latin); To strive is to shine
- Established: 1880
- Founder: Louis Herbert Wellesley Wesley
- Department for Education URN: 126521 Tables
- Chairman of the Governors: Rhodri Thomas
- Headmaster: Alastair Speers
- Age: 2 to 13
- Enrolment: Approx. 230
- Houses: Wylye, Nadder, Ebble, Avon
- Colour
- Website: www.sandroyd.org

Sandroyd School is an independent co-educational preparatory school for day and boarding pupils aged 2 to 13 in the south of Wiltshire, England. The school's main building is Rushmore House, a 19th-century country house which is surrounded by the Rushmore Estate, now playing fields, woods and parkland. Sandroyd School was originally established by Louis Herbert Wellesley Wesley.

In the latest Independent Schools Inspectorate report carried out in 2023, Sandroyd School was judged as 'excellent' across all areas.

== Location ==
The school is in the south of Berwick St John parish, near the village of Tollard Royal and the county border with Dorset.

== History ==
Sandroyd School was founded as a school for boys by L. H. Wellesley Wesley at Sandroyd House, Fairmile, in Cobham, Surrey in 1880. He was a great-grandson of Charles Wesley.

In 1939, in anticipation of the Second World War, the school moved to Rushmore House, home of the Pitt-Rivers family. The house lies in the centre of Cranborne Chase on the borders of Wiltshire and Dorset. A link between the two sites is that Sandroyd House was built in 1860 for the pre-Raphaelite painter John Roddam Spencer Stanhope by the architect Philip Webb (1831–1915), the friend of William Morris, and it was Webb who remodelled the interior of Rushmore for General Pitt Rivers twenty years later.

In the 1960s the school purchased the freehold of the school site. In 1995 the school started to accept day pupils, and in 2004 it became coeducational.

== Nursery and pre-prep school ==
Sandroyd School has a pre-prep and nursery which was opened in 2004, for children aged two to seven. This was described as 'excellent' in an ISI inspection report of 2023.

== List of headmasters ==
- 1880–1898: L. H. Wellesley Wesley
- 1898–1920: C. P. Wilson
- 1920–1931: W. M. Hornby
- 1931–1955: H. ff. Ozanne
- 1955–1963: K. B. Buckland
- 1963–1981: D. C. Howes
- 1981–1982: T. R. Reynolds (acting)
- 1982–1994: D. J. Cann
- 1994–1995: T. R. Reynolds (acting)
- 1995–2003: M. J. Hatch
- 2003–2016: M. J. S. Harris
- 2016–2025: A. B. Speers
- 2025-: S. L. Segrave

== Old Sandroydians ==
See also People educated at Sandroyd School

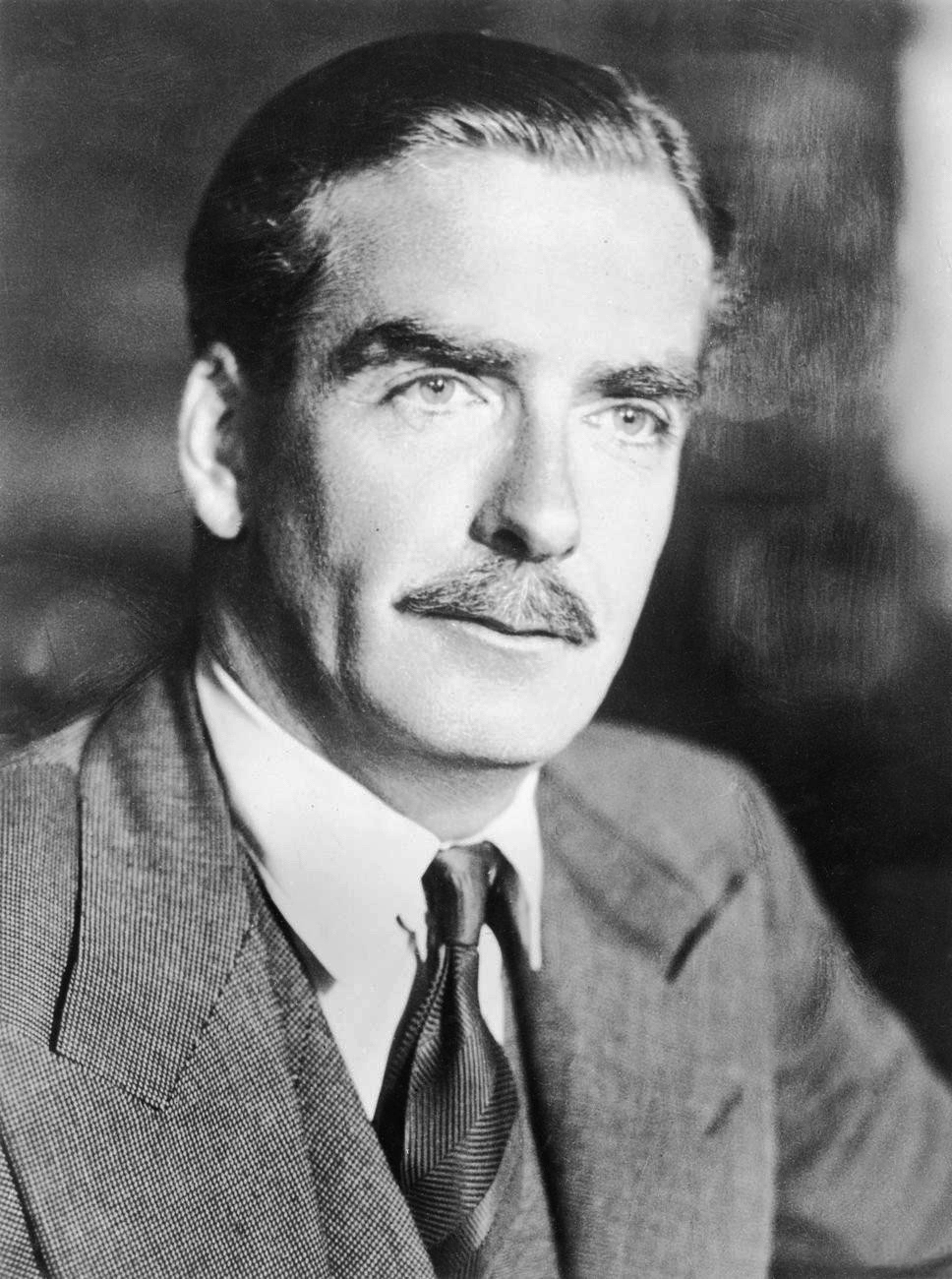
Anthony Eden, Prime Minister

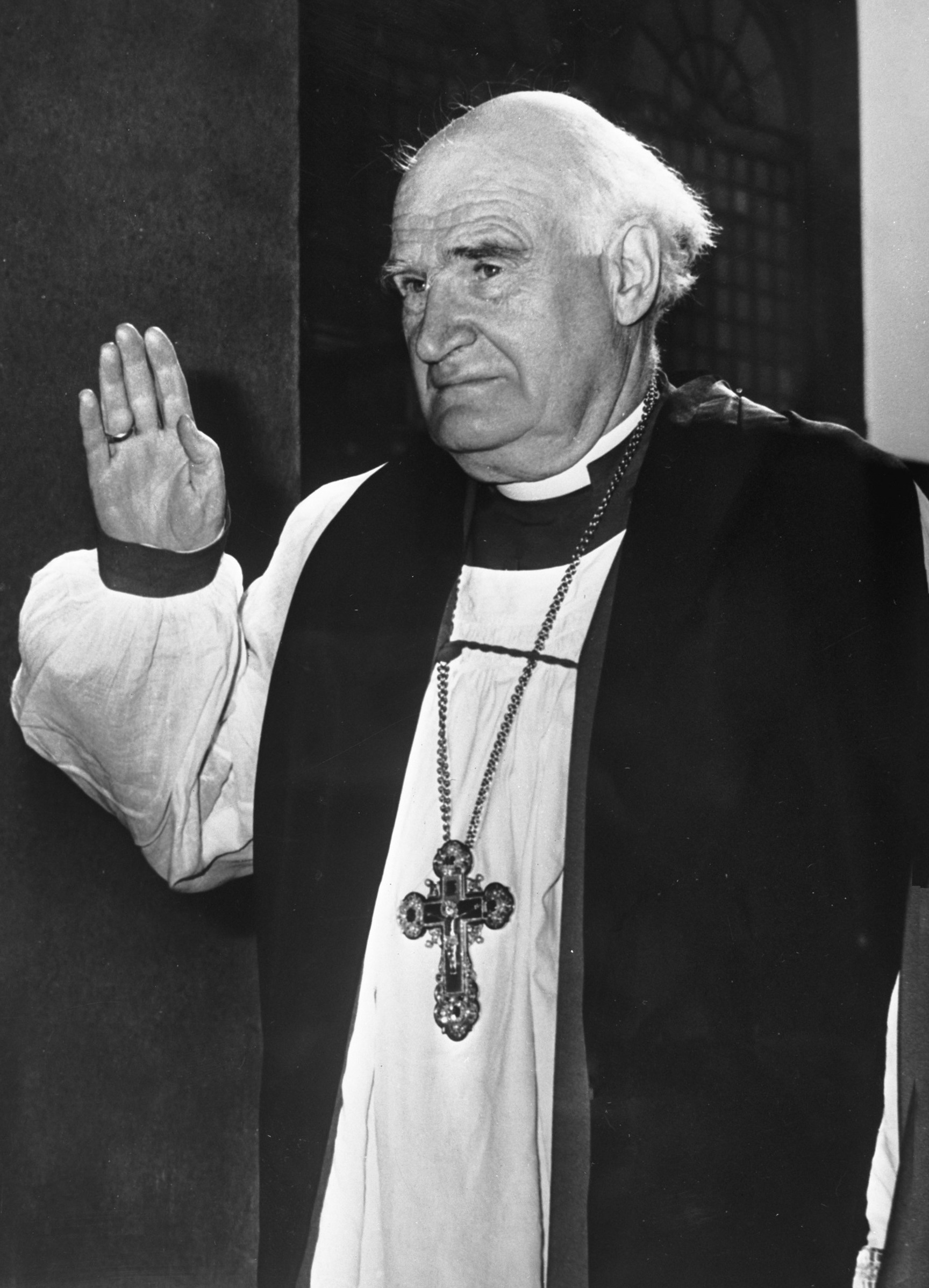
Michael Ramsey, Archbishop of Canterbury

Former pupils, known as Old Sandroydians, include:

- Anthony Eden, Prime Minister
- Michael Ramsey, Archbishop of Canterbury
- Peter II, King of Yugoslavia
- Faisal II, King of Iraq
- Peter Carington, politician
- John Whittingdale, politician
- Anthony Meyer, politician
- Ian Gow, politician
- Tim Sainsbury, politician and businessman
- John Sainsbury, businessman
- Alistair McAlpine, businessman and adviser to Margaret Thatcher
- Randolph Churchill, politician and son of Winston Churchill
- Antony Armstrong-Jones, photographer and husband of Princess Margaret
- Terence Rattigan, playwright
- Wynne Godley, economist
- Michael Dummett, philosopher
- Christopher Hawkes, archaeologist
- Gladwyn Jebb, diplomat
- Charles Madden, admiral
- Antony Read, general
- Ranulph Fiennes, explorer
- Justin Packshaw, explorer
