= Disc barrow =

Type of barrow

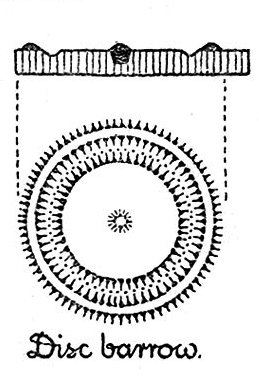
Section and plan of a generic disc barrow

A disc barrow is a type of tumulus or round barrow, a variety of fancy barrow identified in English Heritage's Monument Class Descriptions.

A disc barrow comprises a circular or oval-shaped flat platform, defined by a continuous earthen bank and inner ditch; sometimes the platform is raised above the surrounding ground level. On the platform there are one or more small mounds covering human burials deposited in cists or grave-pits. It is possible for disc barrows to be confused with a wide-bermed bell barrow; the distinguishing characteristic here is the presence of a platform supporting the small barrow mound and the continuous bank around the outside of the barrow ditch.

Disc barrows are a relatively rare kind of Bronze Age burial mound, generally located in the Wessex area of southern England. In common with other contemporary round barrows they are regarded as being the burial monuments of important people; it has been suggested that the Wessex disc barrows were the burial places of important females, although this is based on the analysis of a very small number of cremation deposits and assumptions about the ownership of the main kinds of grave goods recovered.

The 18th century antiquarian William Stukeley referred to this type of barrow as a druid barrow, a practice that was continued by Richard Colt Hoare in the early 19th century, even though he did not subscribe to the idea that their creation had any connection with druids.

== Notable examples of disc barrows in southern England ==
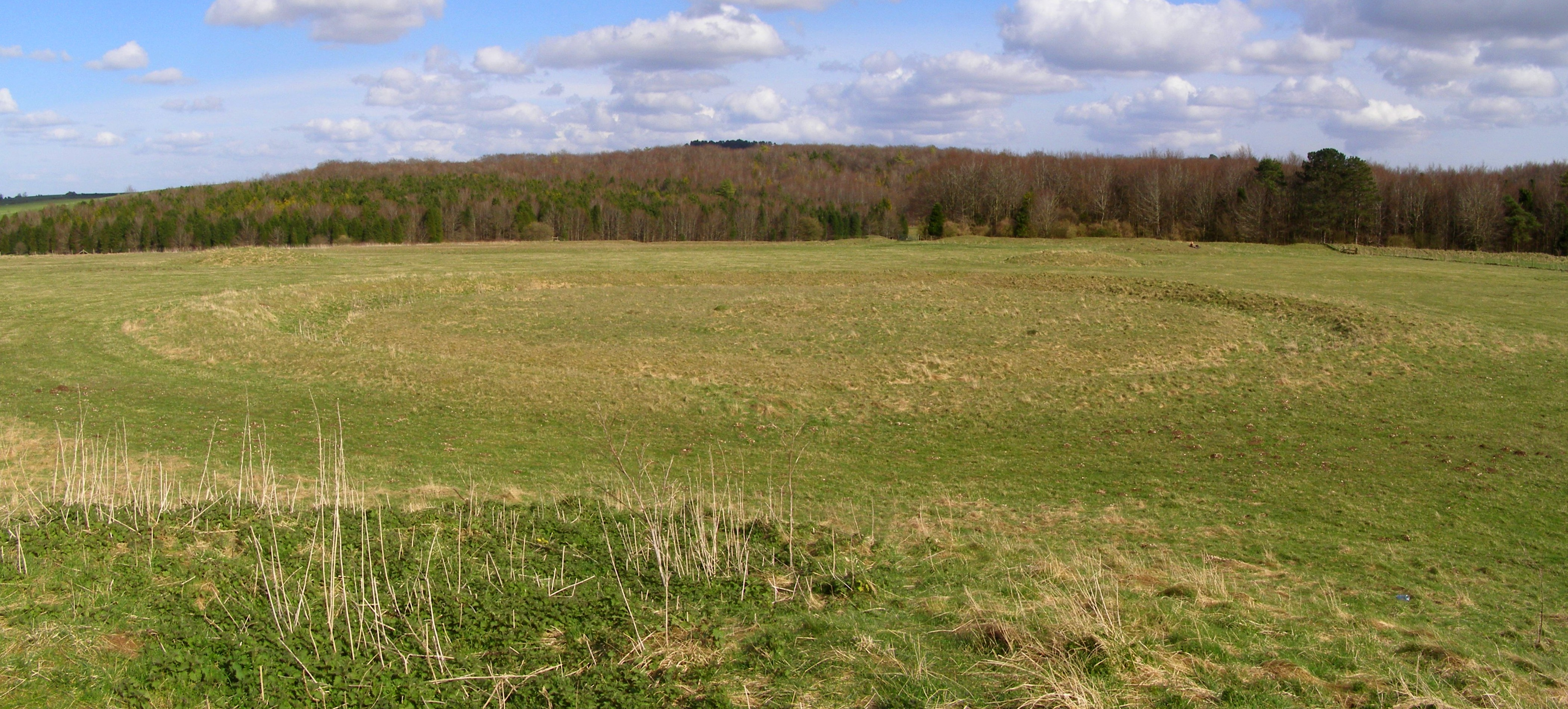
Disc barrow on Oakley Down, Dorset

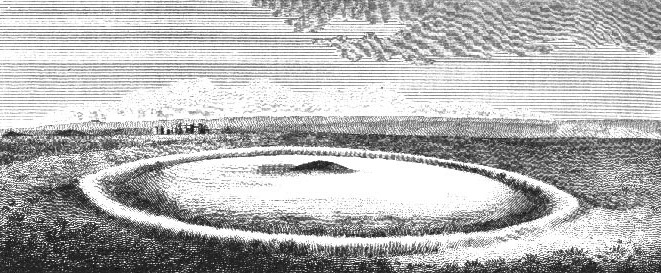
Engraving of a 'druid barrow' by Sir Richard Colt Hoare

- The Flowerdown disc barrow at Littleton, near Winchester in Hampshire, is described as an "exceptionally fine example" of this type of ancient monument.
- On Setley Plain, near Brockenhurst in Hampshire, there are a pair of overlapping disc barrows which survive in particularly fine condition, and are one of only two known pairs of overlapping barrows of this type in England.
- There are at least five disc barrows in Oakley Down Barrow Cemetery, near Sixpenny Handley in Dorset. One of these disc barrows is cut on the south-east side by the Ackling Dyke Roman road, which led early antiquarians such as William Stukeley to conclude that the barrows were a pre-Roman feature.
- The Upwey disc barrow at map reference SY 663866 located on the Ridgeway above the district of Upwey, Weymouth, Dorset; is a very fine and large example of this type of barrow. It has an exceptionally big centre mound.

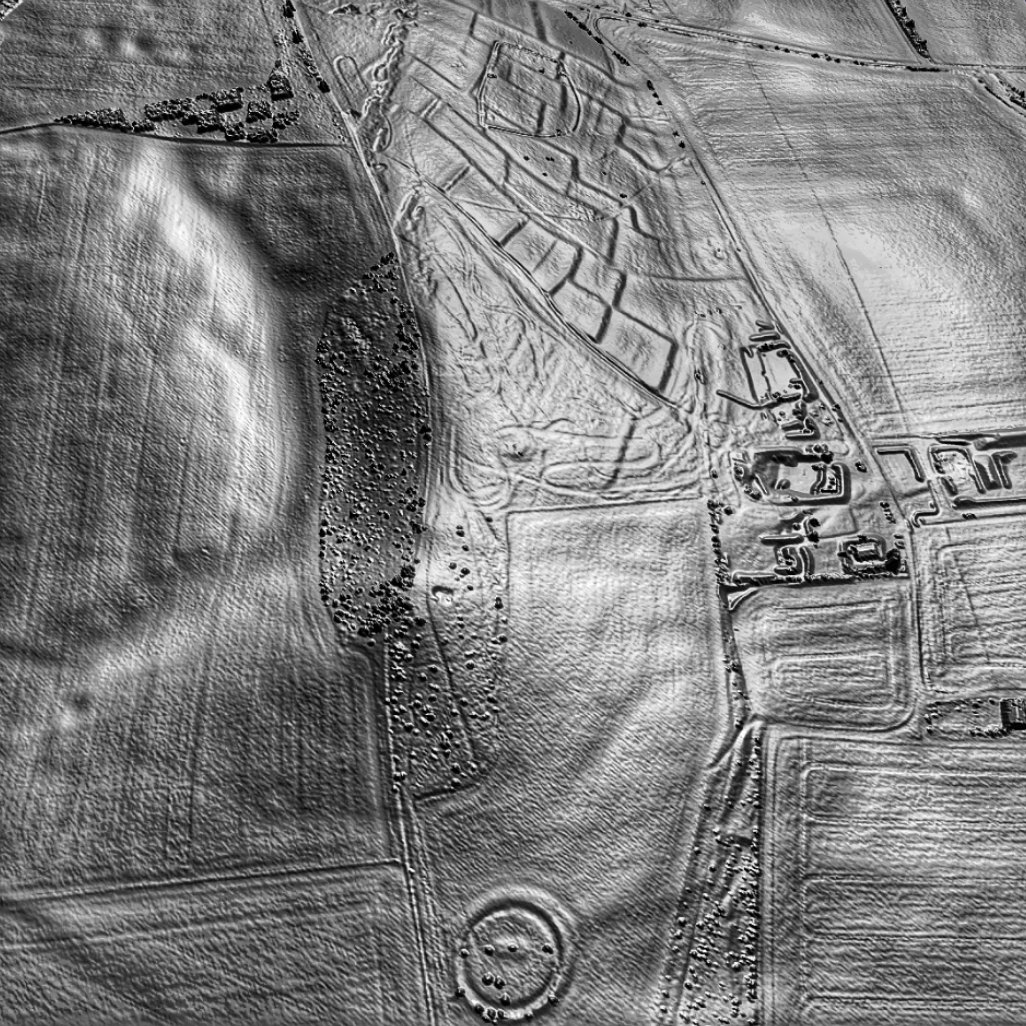
A lidar view of Burderop Down Disc Barrow, Iron Age Settlement and Celtic Field Systems in Wiltshire.
