= Woodcutts =

Hamlet in Dorset, England

Coordinates: 50.9518°N 2.0449°W

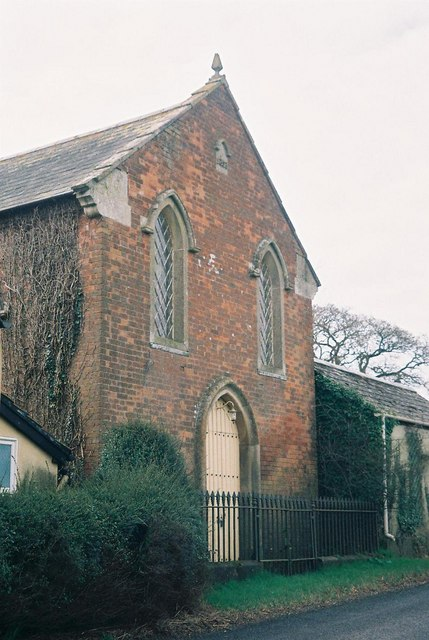
- The former chapel in Woodcutts

- Location within Dorset
- OS grid reference: ST969167
- Unitary authority: Dorset
- Ceremonial county: Dorset
- Region: South West
- Country: England
- Sovereign state: United Kingdom
- Post town: SALISBURY
- Postcode district: SP5
- Dialling code: 01725
- Police: Dorset
- Fire: Dorset and Wiltshire
- Ambulance: South Western
- UK Parliament: North Dorset

Woodcutts is a hamlet within the parish of Sixpenny Handley and is located in the north of Dorset, near to the Wiltshire border. Originally named "Woodcotes", in its present form the 18th century country estate still consists of the Manor House, the Manor Farm, a number of cottages, a school house and a chapel.

It lies within the Cranborne Chase an Area of Outstanding Natural Beauty. The estate and much of the land and several of the properties were bought and amalgamated with the neighbouring Rushmore Estate by its owner Augustus Pitt Rivers, a noted archaeologist of the 19th century, for the purpose of doing archeological research. Woodcutts includes the site of a Romano-British settlement excavated in 1884–5 by Pitt Rivers.

The 1st Woodcutts Scouts group was founded in 1957 and provides activities for the young people of the area with Beavers, Cubs, Scouts and Explorer sections.
