= John Priaulx =

Anglican priest in 17th century England

The Venerable John Priaulx, D.D. was an Anglican priest in England during the 17th century.

Priaulx was educated at Merton College, Oxford. He held the livings at Fovant, Long Newnton and Berwick St John, all (at that time) in Wiltshire. He was Archdeacon of Sarum from 1671 until his death on 2 June 1674.
