= Flowerdown Barrows =

Barrow in England

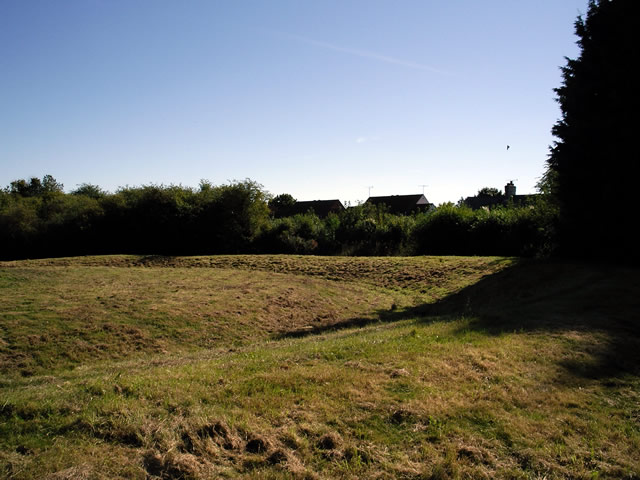

- Location within Hampshire
- 51°05′07″N 1°20′46″W
- Type: Tumuli
- Location: Kennel Lane, Littleton
- OS grid reference: SU 45879 31984

Site notes
- Area: Hampshire
- Owner: English Heritage

Scheduled monument
- Official name: Three round barrows 500m WNW of Flowerdown House
- Designated: 29 Mar 1949
- Reference no.: 1012690

Flowerdown Barrows is a Bronze Age Barrow site near Littleton, Winchester, Hampshire, England. It is a scheduled monument looked after by English Heritage.

== Description of site ==
The site has three Bronze Age burial mounds in a much larger cemetery, two bowl barrows and a well-preserved disc barrow which has been described as "the finest in Hampshire". The disc barrow is 28 metres (92 ft) in diameter and contains two circular mounds of 7 metres (23 ft) and 6 metres (20 ft) diameter respectively. The larger mound is centrally positioned and has a central hollow. The larger of the two bowl barrows is 20 metres (66 ft) in diameter and 1 metre (3.3 ft) high. The other, situated close to the edge of the disc barrow, is 8 metres (26 ft) in diameter and only 0.3 metres (0.98 ft) high.

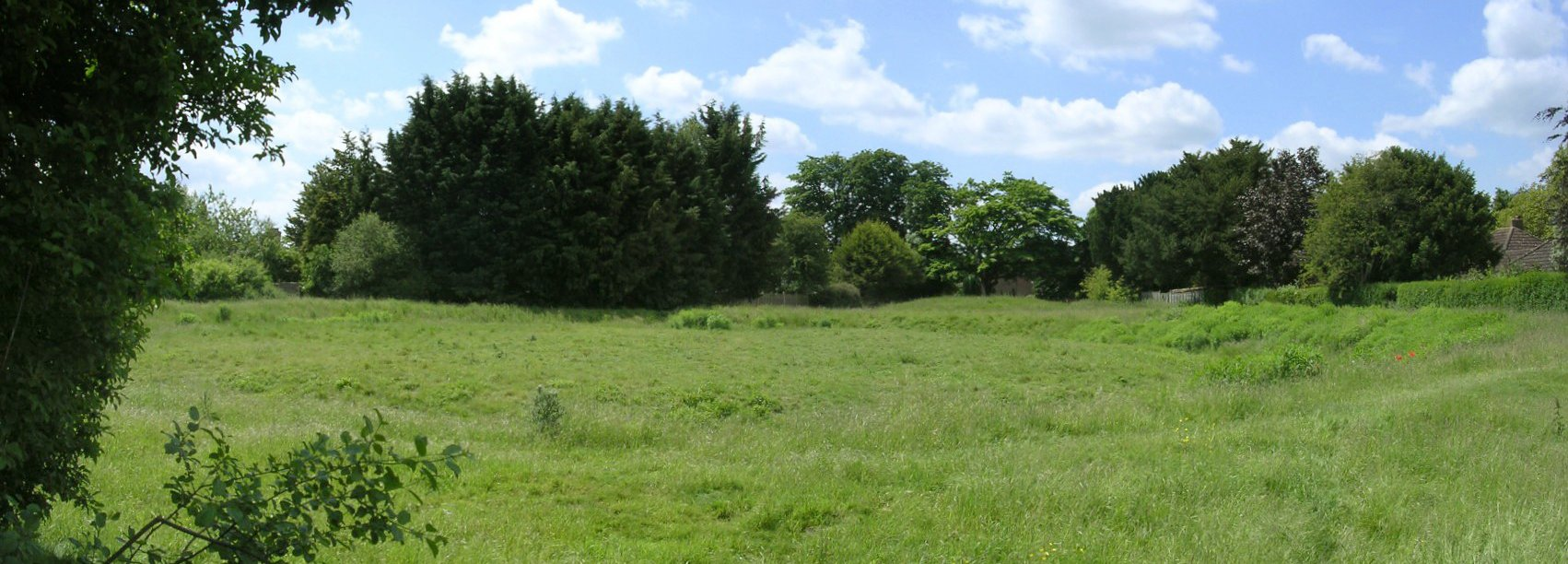
Panorama of the disc barrow at Flowerdown, with the bowl barrow in the background.
