= Shipton Gorge =

Village and civil parish in Dorset, England

Coordinates: 50.7211°N 2.7136°W

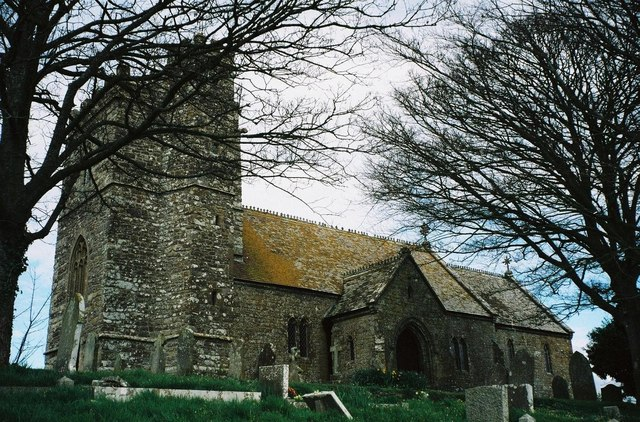
- Parish church of St Martin

- Location within Dorset
- Population: 350
- OS grid reference: SY497915
- Civil parish: Shipton Gorge
- Unitary authority: Dorset
- Ceremonial county: Dorset
- Region: South West
- Country: England
- Sovereign state: United Kingdom
- Post town: Bridport
- Postcode district: DT6
- Dialling code: 01308
- Police: Dorset
- Fire: Dorset and Wiltshire
- Ambulance: South Western
- UK Parliament: West Dorset
- Website: Village website

Shipton Gorge is a village and civil parish in southwest Dorset, England, 3 miles (4.8 km) east of Bridport. Dorset County Council's 2013 mid-year estimate of the population of Shipton Gorge parish is 350. In the 2011 national census, results have been published for the parish of Shipton Gorge combined with the small neighbouring parish of Chilcombe to the east; the population of these areas was 381.

In 1086 in the Domesday Book Shipton Gorge was recorded as Sepetone. The village is named after the de Gorges family who owned the land hundreds of years ago. The parish church of St Martin—which used to be a chapel of Burton Bradstock—was rebuilt in 1862, except for its west tower which dates from around 1400.

The terrain surrounding the village is hilly. Northeast of the village is Shipton Hill, which offers good views of the surrounding countryside from its 170 metres (560 ft) summit. On the hill is evidence of a prehistoric settlement.

Squadron Leader Ted Flavell, who in 1956 had carried out the first British air drop of an atomic bomb during Operation Buffalo, lived in Shipton Gorge during his retirement.
