= Morgan's Hill Enclosure =

Archaeological site in Wiltshire, England

- Location within Wiltshire
- 51°24′8.6″N 1°56′37.8″W
- Periods: Romano-British or earlier
- Location: near Calne, Wiltshire
- OS grid reference: SU 040 670

Scheduled monument
- Designated: 10 November 1964
- Reference no.: 1014032

Morgan's Hill Enclosure is an archaeological site in Wiltshire, England, on Morgan's Hill south-east of Calne, about 130 metres (430 ft) north of the Wansdyke. It is a scheduled monument.

== Description ==
The earthwork is a square, aligned west–east, with sides of length 180 metres (590 ft) enclosing an area of about 3.25 hectares (8.0 acres)), with a bank of height up to 0.6 metres (2 ft 0 in) and width about 3 metres (9.8 ft). Outside the bank is a ditch of width about 4 metres (13 ft) and depth up to 1 metre (3 ft 3 in). There are three entrances around the rectangle, but it is not known if these are original.

There was some excavation in 1909: some medieval pottery was found at the surface, but nothing was found that could clearly relate to its original construction.

=== Purpose ===
Enclosures like this are considered to show evidence of agricultural practices, from the Neolithic period to the Romano-British period; they were stock pens or protected areas for crops. Several comparable enclosures are known in the area of the Avebury prehistoric complex, about 4 miles (6.4 km) to the east, which was in use in the Neolithic period and early Bronze Age.

== See also ==
- List of prehistoric structures in Great Britain
