= Rotherley Downs =

Protected area in Wiltshire, England

Coordinates: 50.97579°N 2.07829°W

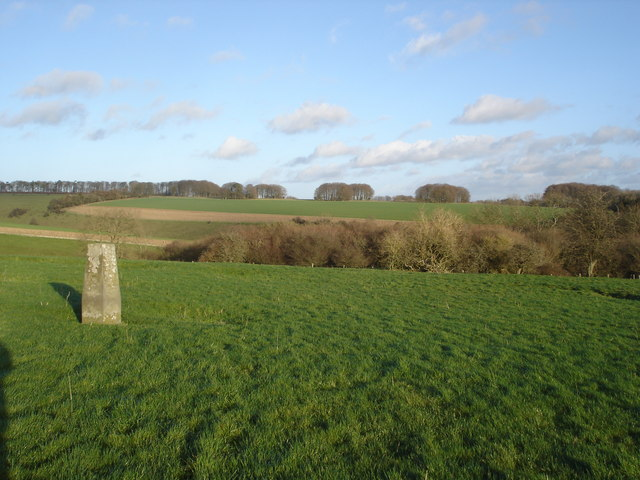
Rotherley Down

Rotherley Downs (grid reference ST946196) is a 120.05 hectare biological Site of Special Scientific Interest in Wiltshire, England, notified in 1989.

The site consists of two north–south aligned combes – Rotherley Bottom and Malacombe Bottom. Most of the site is in Berwick St John parish, with a western portion in Tollard Royal parish.
