= Winklebury Hill =

Protected area in Wiltshire, England

Coordinates: 50.9938°N 2.0698°W

Winkelbury Hill (grid reference ST952216) is a 62.95 hectare biological Site of Special Scientific Interest in Berwick St John parish, south-west Wiltshire, England. The site is on the southern flank of the Ebble valley and was notified in 1971 for its herb-rich unimproved chalk grassland, which has some nationally scarce plants and butterflies.

View of Winkelbury from the west
