= Wattle (construction) =

Panel made by weaving branches

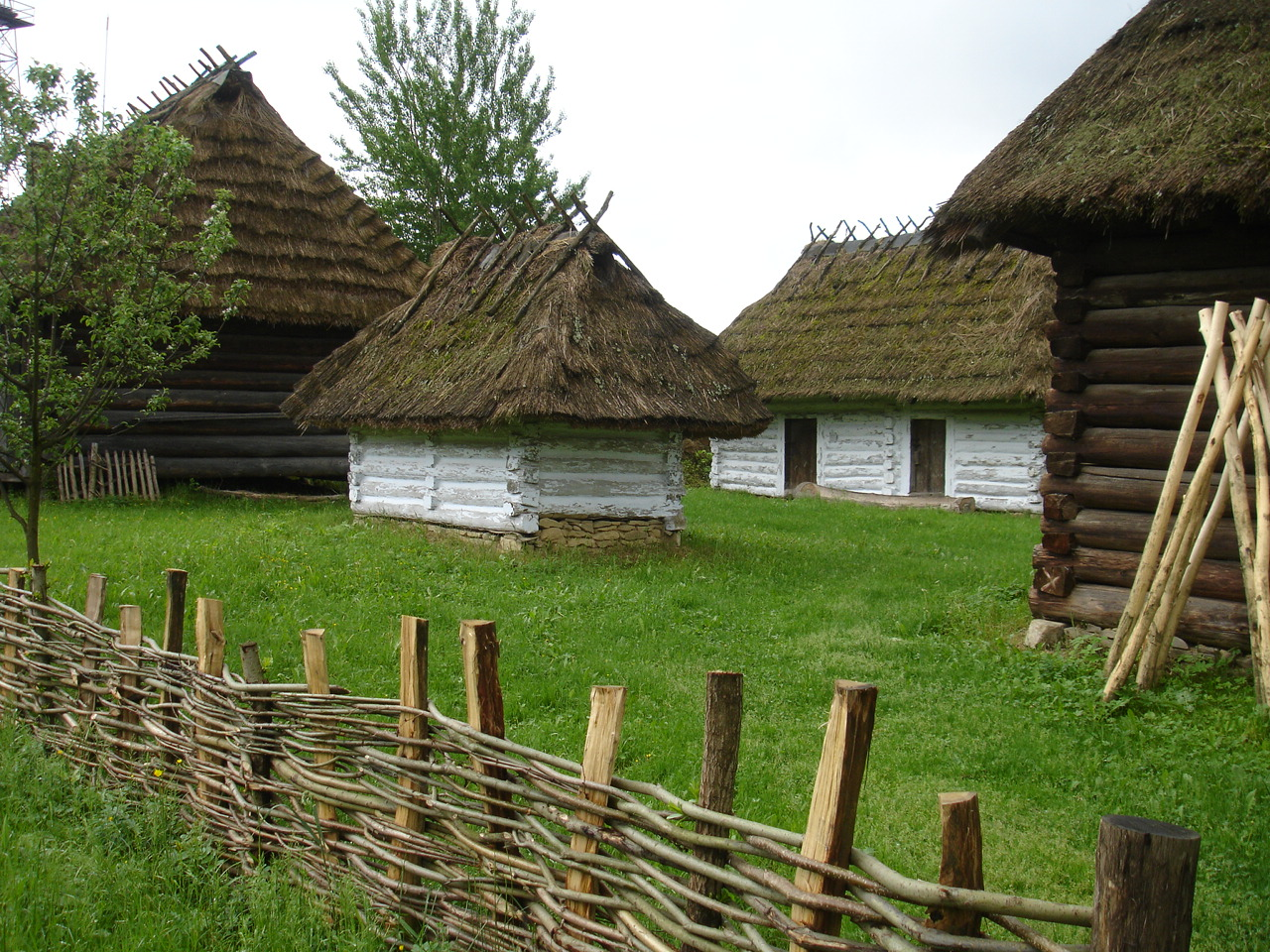
A wattle fence at an outdoor museum in Poland

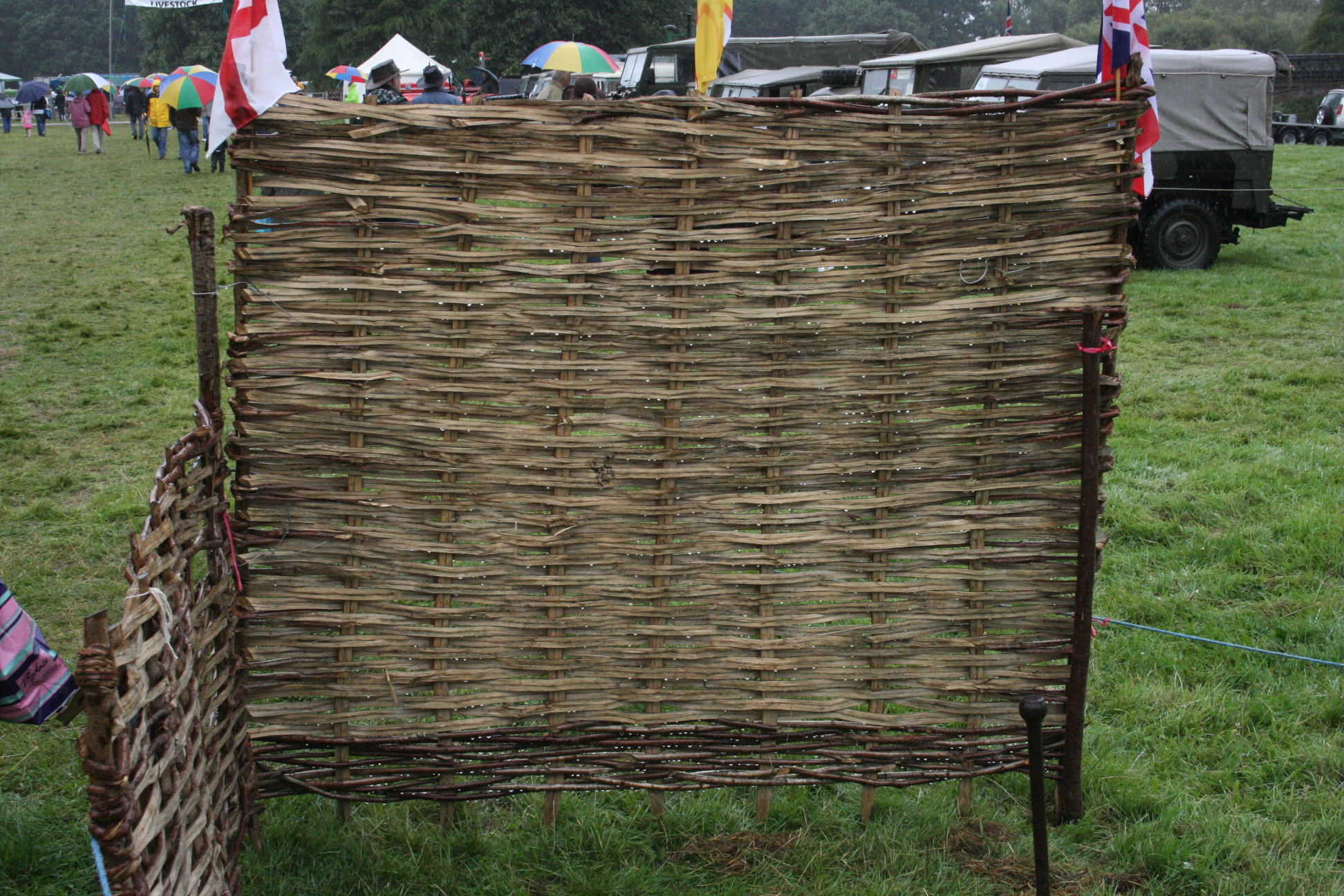
Wattle hurdle or panel

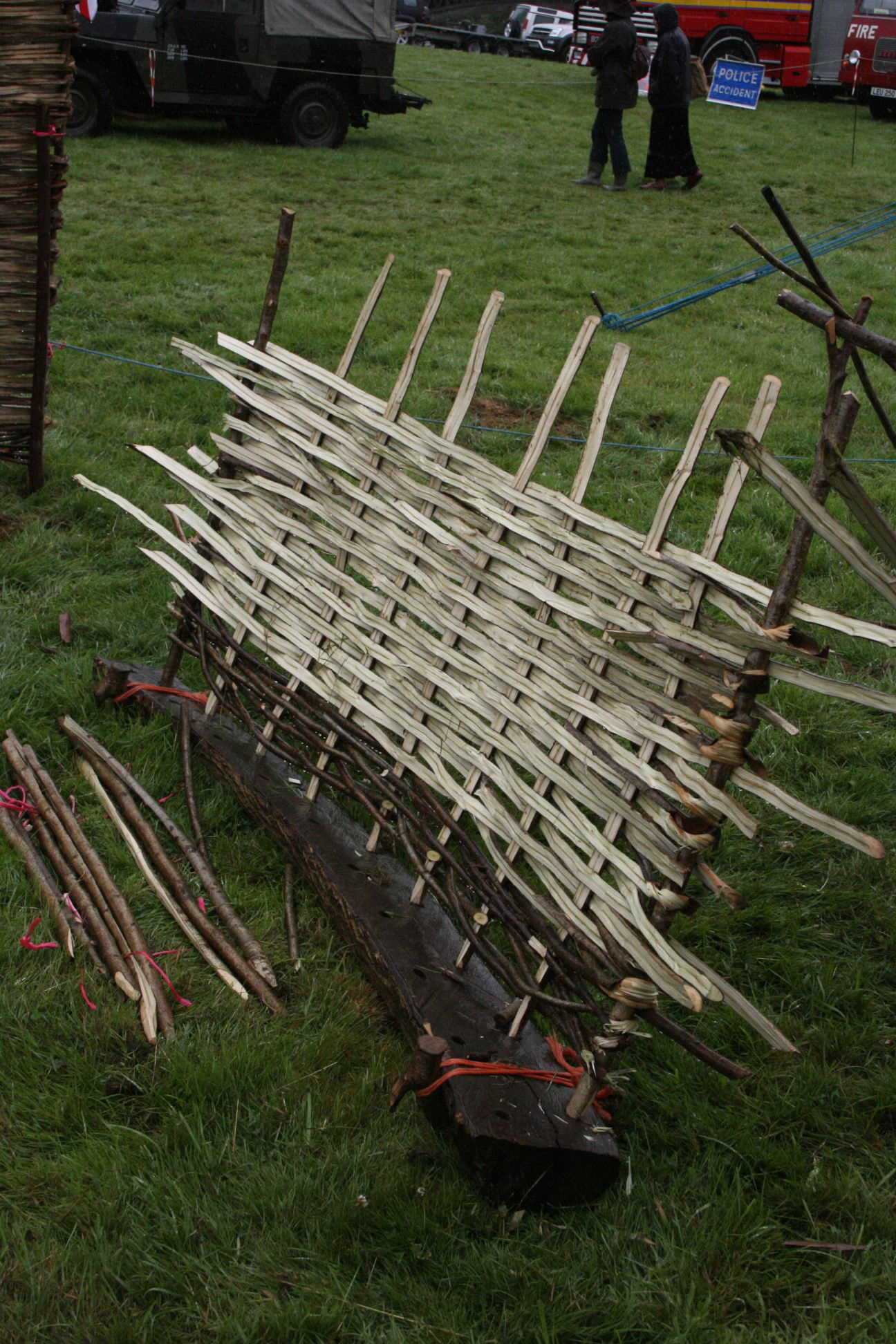
A wattle hurdle being constructed on a frame

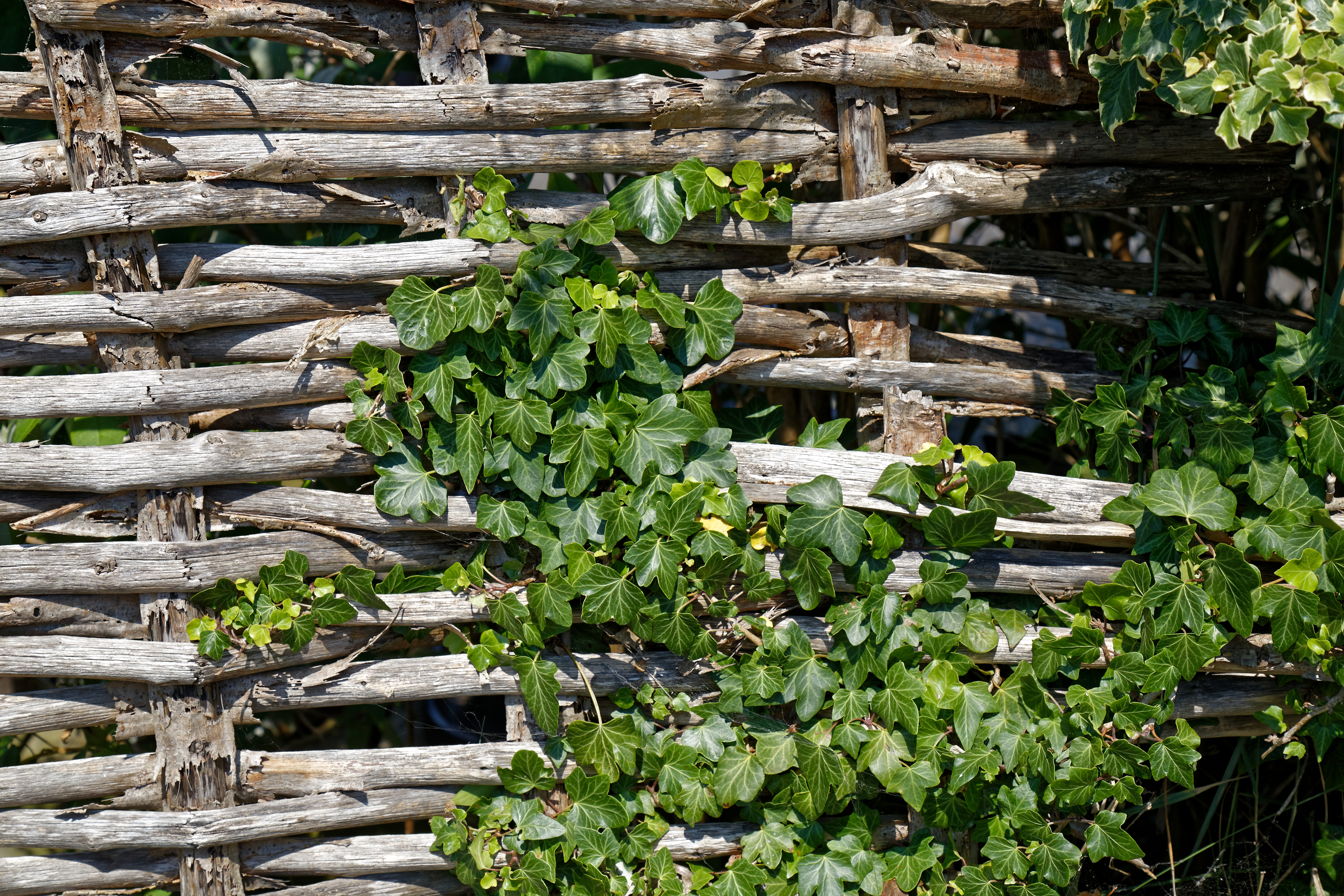
Braided wattle hurdle fence with ivy, West Sussex, England

Wattle is a lattice made by weaving flexible branches around upright stakes. The wattle may be made into an individual panel, commonly called a hurdle, or it may be formed into a continuous fence. Wattles also form the basic structure for wattle and daub wall construction, where wattling is daubed with a plaster-like substance to make a weather-resistant wall.

== History ==
Evidence of wattle construction was found at Woodcutts Settlement from the British Iron Age, and the Roman Vitruvius wrote about wattles in his book on architecture, De architectura, but the technique goes back to Neolithic times.

In England the Romans used wattlework for various purposes, as for the lining of wells, as at Caersws. ... In these Romano-British examples the wattling does not appear to have been in frames, as the rounded daubing of the ends of the wattling was found. Apparently the ends of the wattle stakes were merely driven into the ground without a sill ... Probably the ends of the Romano-British wattles were formed in the same manner as are hurdles in West Surrey to-day. The hurdle maker uses a 'hurdle frame,' a long shaped block slightly curved to hold the feet of the uprights, which are round rods; 'the man then weaves in horizontally the smaller split rods till he has filled up the hurdle. When he comes to either end he gives the rod a clever twist that opens the fibres and gives it something the character of a rope, so that it passes tough-stranded and unbroken round the end uprights.' When the twigs or wattles had been interwoven with the posts the hurdle became one homogenous whole.

== Technique ==
The construction of wattles starts with the uprights (staves), which are set into a frame or placed into the ground. Starting at the bottom, flexible saplings or branches, called withies, are woven in and out of the uprights (staves). Traditionally, willow shoots were used for wattle fence withies, as willow provides a hardy and fast-growing wood that can also be stored and then soaked to restore their flexibility. However, other woods like alder, hazel, maple, or birch, or water sprouts from pear and apple trees may also be used. Withies must be flexible, so spring wood or freshly-cut saplings work better than fallen branches or late summer wood. Withies must be long enough to be woven between at least three of the upright posts (staves) to achieve tension and retain the fence shape. After a layer of withies is woven between the staves, they are pushed down and the process is repeated, sometimes with staggering the start point of the withies.

Wattle fences typically last up to 10 years, depending on the climate and the wood used.

== Wattle and daub ==
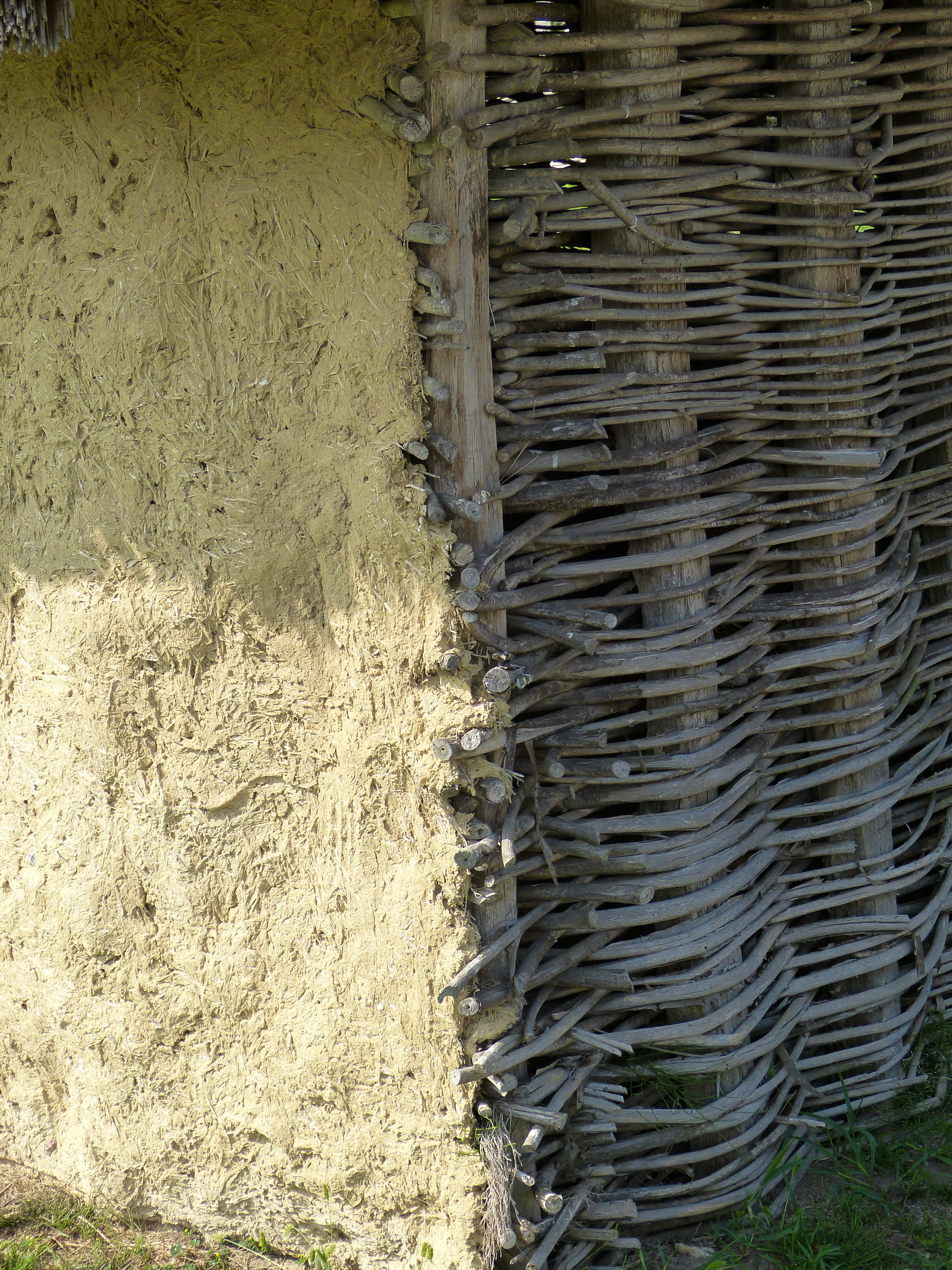
Wattle and daub walls (cutaway to show construction)

Wattles forms the basis of wattle and daub, a composite building material used for making walls, in which wattle is daubed with a sticky material usually made of some combination of wet soil, clay, sand, animal dung and straw. Wattle and daub has been used for at least 6,000 years, and is still an important construction material in many parts of the world. The technique is similar to modern lath and plaster, a common building material for wall and ceiling surfaces, in which a series of nailed wooden strips are covered with plaster smoothed into a flat surface. Many historic buildings include wattle and daub construction, mostly as infill panels in timber frame construction.

== See also ==
- Basket weaving
- Lath and plaster
- Wattle and daub
