= Martin Down Enclosure =

Archaeological feature in Hampshire, England

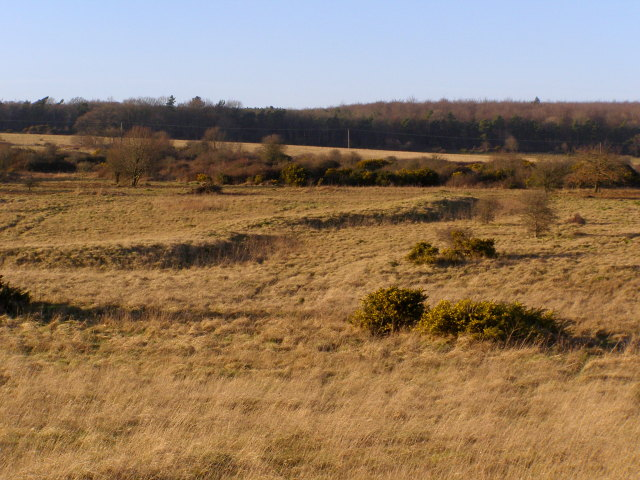
- Looking north-west across the site

- Location within Hampshire
- 50°58′47″N 1°56′24″W
- Periods: Bronze Age; Romano-British
- Location: Martin Down, Hampshire
- OS grid reference: SU 043 200

Site notes
- Excavation dates: 1895–1896
- Archaeologists: Augustus Pitt Rivers

Scheduled monument
- Designated: 20 October 1936
- Reference no.: 1010870

The Martin Down Enclosure is an archaeological site on Martin Down, near the village of Martin, in Hampshire, England. It is near the boundaries with Dorset and Wiltshire.

The site is a scheduled monument, and it is one of several archaeological features on Martin Down, such as Bokerley Dyke.

The enclosure is the original example of a type of prehistoric feature, the "Martin Down style enclosure": they are small enclosures of the Bronze Age, area often less than 0.3 hectares (0.74 acres), considered to be domestic settlements. They have mostly been found on downland of central southern England, usually situated on hillsides. Other examples are on Harrow Hill and Thundersbarrow Hill, both in West Sussex, South Lodge in Wiltshire, and on Shearplace Hill in Dorset.

== Description ==
There was excavation by Augustus Pitt Rivers from November 1895 to March 1896. He excavated all of the bank and ditch, and about half of the interior; the present earthwork is his reconstruction. It was concluded that the site is middle Bronze Age, with later Romano-British occupation. Finds from the excavation included worked flint, animal bone and pottery of the Bronze Age and Romano-British period.

The rectangular enclosure has internal dimensions of about 90 metres (300 ft) south-west to north-east by 63 metres (207 ft). It has a single bank of width up to 10 metres (33 ft) and up to 0.7 metres (2 ft 4 in) above the interior, and there is an external ditch. There is a gap (established as original during the excavation) at the eastern end of the north side, width about 40 metres (130 ft), and there are entrances on the east and south sides.

== Excavations by Pitt Rivers ==
Other sites on Cranborne Chase excavated by Pitt Rivers include the Rotherley Down Settlement, South Lodge Camp, Woodcutts Settlement, and Wor Barrow.
