= Shipton Hill Settlement =

Hillfort in Dorset, England

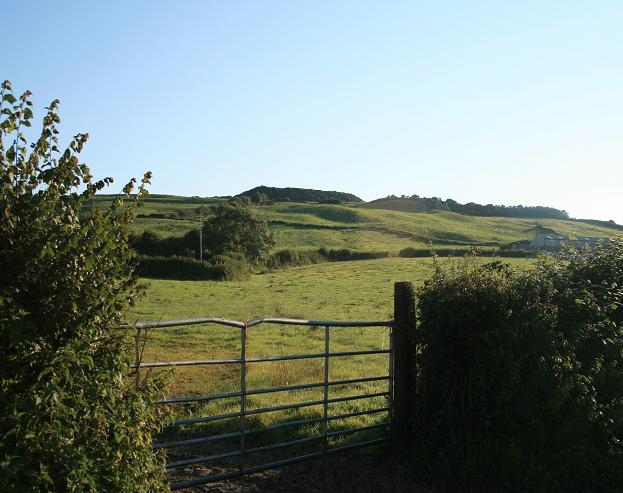
- Looking north towards Shipton Hill from Lynch Farm

- Location within Dorset
- 50°43′36″N 2°41′56″W
- Periods: Iron Age
- Location: near Shipton Gorge, Dorset
- OS grid reference: SY 507 921

Scheduled monument
- Official name: Earthwork on Shipton Hill
- Designated: 24 March 1958
- Reference no.: 1002779

The Shipton Hill Settlement is an archaeological site, a defended settlement of the Iron Age, near Shipton Gorge in Dorset, England. It is a scheduled monument.

== Description ==
The site is regarded as a defended settlement, a rare monument type; such sites are found in upland areas of south-west England, sometimes situated in prominent locations but smaller than hillforts. They were occupied by small communities, perhaps a single family group.

The 19th-century antiquarian Charles Warne described the hill: "The natural configuration of this hill renders it a very singular object from many distant points of view, giving it the resemblance of the hull of a ship inverted...."; the summit "was found to be ovate in form, and about four acres in extent, with its weakest side scarped the simplest method of fortifying such a hill; and by which a fosse and vallum were easily constructed. But so great are its natural advantages that little assistance from art was required, and that little rendered it an impregnable fortress."

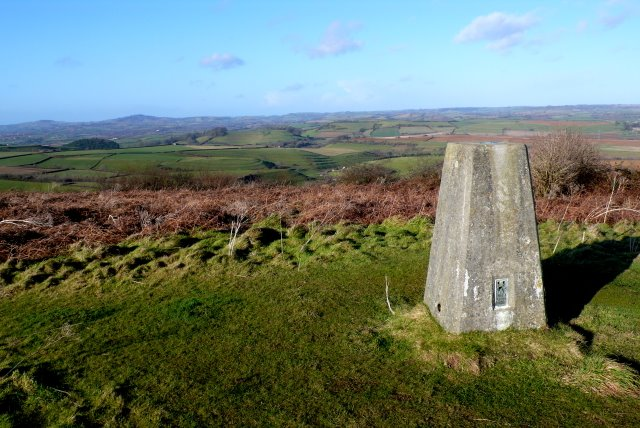
The trig point on the summit, and the view north

The oval enclosure (the longest dimension being west to east) has natural slopes to the west and east, but is steepened to the north and south. At the base of the hill there are banks with dtches: on the south, the bank has width about 10 metres (33 ft) and height 2.5 metres (8 ft 2 in), cut by a modern track, and on the north the bank has width about 10 metres (33 ft) and height 1.3 metres (4 ft 3 in). Near the centre of the enclosure is a small circular mound, diameter 10 metres (33 ft) and height 0.2 metres (7.9 in), on which is a modern trig point; the mound may possibly be a bowl barrow.

There has been partial excavation: objects found include Iron Age pottery sherds, hammer stones, flint flakes, scrapers and fragments of quern-stone.
