= Shearplace Hill Enclosure =

- Location within Dorset
- 50°47′8″N 2°30′43″W
- Periods: Bronze Age
- Location: near Cerne Abbas, Dorset
- OS grid reference: SY 640 986

Site notes
- Area: 0.5 hectares (1.2 acres)

Scheduled monument
- Designated: 30 April 1957
- Reference no.: 1002766

The Shearplace Hill Enclosure is an archaeological site of the Bronze Age, about 1.5 miles (2.4 km) south-west of Cerne Abbas in Dorset, England. It is a scheduled monument.

== Description ==
It is a Martin Down style enclosure, named after the Bronze Age enclosure on Martin Down in Hampshire. Sites of this type, interpreted as domestic settlements, have mostly been found on downland of central southern England, usually situated on hillsides.

The site, covering about 0.5 hectares (1.2 acres), is on a north facing slope of Shearplace Hill, which overlooks to the west the valley of Sydling Water. There is a series of banks, height up to 1.2 metres (3 ft 11 in), and sunken trackways up to 1.7 metres (5 ft 7 in) deep.

There was excavation in 1958 by Philip Rahtz. He established that there was a farmstead of several enclosures, the principal enclosure containing two round houses; and that it was occupied from the Middle to Late Bronze Age, when it was abandoned. Finds included pottery of the Deverel–Rimbury culture, loom weights, flint scrapers and animal bones.
