= Devil's Lapful =

Archeological site in Northumberland, England

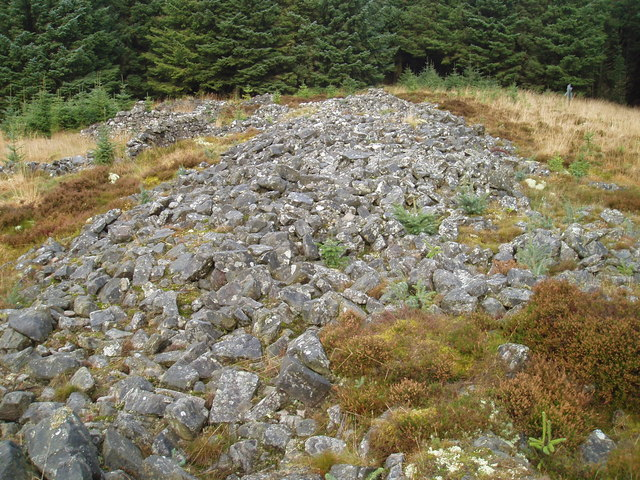

- Location within Northumberland
- 55°13′43.320″N 2°33′52.200″W
- Type: Long cairn
- Periods: Neolithic
- Location: near Kielder
- OS grid reference: NY 642 929

Scheduled monument
- Designated: 15 November 1994
- Reference no.: 1009666

Devil's Lapful is an archaeological site in Northumberland, England, in Kielder Forest about 0.8 miles (1.3 km) south-east of Kielder. The site, a Neolithic long cairn, is a scheduled monument.

== Description ==
The cairn is one of few surviving long cairns in Northumberland. It is on the south-west slope of a hill, and is orientated north-north-east to south-south-west. It is constructed of rounded boulders with some stone slabs, and with smaller stones at the edges; it measures 60 by 14 metres (197 by 46 ft), and is 2 metres (6 ft 7 in) high. There has been some later quarrying to make a sheep fold, which is next to the cairn on the north-west.

Monuments such as this are thought to date from the Early to Middle Neolithic (about 3400–2400 BC); they were probably burials sites for a local community over several generations.
