= Wor Barrow =

Archaeological site in Dorset, England

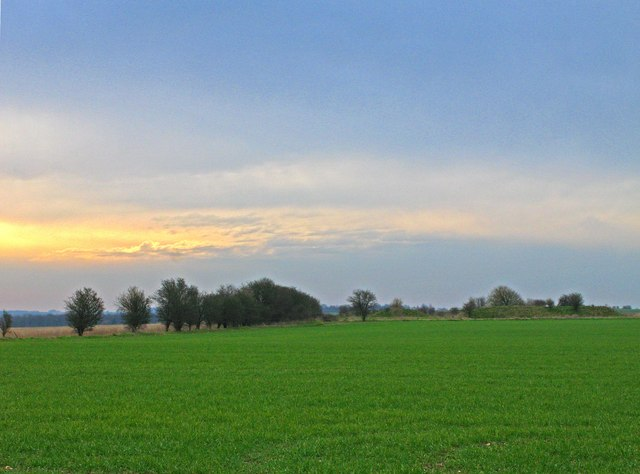
- Viewed from the north-west

- Location within Dorset
- 50°57′18.7″N 1°59′1.9″W
- Periods: Neolithic
- Location: near Sixpenny Handley, Dorset
- OS grid reference: SU 012 173

Site notes
- Excavation dates: 1893–1894
- Archaeologists: Augustus Pitt Rivers

Scheduled monument
- Official name: Wor Barrow and two bowl barrows on Handley Down
- Designated: 11 November 1954
- Reference no.: 1020066

Wor Barrow is a Neolithic long barrow on Cranborne Chase, about 1 mile (1.6 km) east of Sixpenny Handley in Dorset, England. It is a scheduled monument.

Its excavation by Augustus Pitt Rivers in 1893–1894 has been described as "an important event in the study of British archaeology".

== Description ==
There are many prehistoric remains on Cranborne Chase from the Neolithic and Early Bronze Age. There are two bowl barrows nearby, and a group of round barrows at Oakley Down to the east: the presence of Wor Barrow may have been influential in their construction.

The barrow, aligned north-west to south-east, dates from the Early to Middle Neolithic period, about 3400–2400 BC. It was originally 45 metres (148 ft) long and 23 metres (75 ft) wide; its height was about 3 metres (9.8 ft). A ditch surrounded the barrow, 3–7.5 metres (9.8–24.6 ft) wide and up to 4 metres (13 ft) deep.

=== Excavation ===
Augustus Pitt Rivers, inheritor of the Rushmore Estate, where he was resident from 1880, investigated many prehistoric monuments on his estate. Wor Barrow was totally excavated by Pitt Rivers, the ditch in 1893 and the barrow in 1894; the results were published in detail.

In the ditch were found two Early Neolithic burials, stratified pottery from Early to Late Neolithic, and several burials from the Romano-British period. The mound had Romano-British burials in the upper levels; below were the remains of a rectangular timber enclosure, about 27 by 10 metres (89 by 33 ft), with traces of a turf mound covering it. The enclosure had an entrance at the south-east, and within were six male skeletons, three of which were disarticulated.

The timber mortuary enclosure, surrounded originally by a rectangular ditch, is regarded as the first phase of construction. In the second phase, the barrow covered the mortuary enclosure, and the earlier ditch was partly destroyed by the ditch of the barrow.

The earth from the excavation was deposited in a terraced bank along the south-west side. The intention of Pitt Rivers was that the site should be an amphitheatre "for games or other amusements and exhibitions".

== Excavations by Pitt Rivers ==
Other sites on Cranborne Chase excavated by Pitt Rivers include the Martin Down Enclosure, Rotherley Down Settlement, South Lodge Camp and Woodcutts Settlement.
