= South Lodge Camp =

- Location within Wiltshire
- 50°57′22″N 2°4′1″W
- Periods: Bronze Age
- Location: near Tollard Royal
- OS grid reference: ST 954 174

Site notes
- Excavation dates: 1880–1893, 1977–1981
- Archaeologists: Augustus Pitt Rivers; John Barrett, Richard Bradley, Martin Green

Scheduled monument
- Designated: 10 April 1957
- Reference no.: 1020962

South Lodge Camp is an archaeological site of the Bronze Age, about 0.6 miles (1.0 km) south-east of the village of Tollard Royal, in Wiltshire, England. The site is on Cranborne Chase, near the boundary with Dorset. It is a scheduled monument.

== Description ==
The site is in Berwick St John parish, on a gentle west-facing slope above a dry valley. There is a Martin Down style enclosure (named after the enclosure at Martin Down, also on Cranborne Chase), and a cemetery of six round barrows nearby at Barrow Pleck.

=== Excavations ===
Augustus Pitt Rivers, inheritor of the Rushmore Estate, where he was resident from 1880, investigated many prehistoric monuments on his estate. He excavated the site at South Lodge: the barrow cemetery from 1880 to 1883, and the enclosure in 1893. He reconstructed the enclosure and barrows after excavation, and in the barrows he erected concrete plinths marking the location of cremations. The Salisbury Museum has a Bronze Age clay urn, found by Pitt Rivers in the ditch around the enclosure.

There was re-excavation from 1977 to 1981 by John Barrett, Richard Bradley and Martin Green. Two round timber buildings, and a mound of burnt flint thought to be a cooking area, were found inside the enclosure. Hollows, thought by Pitt Rivers to be natural, were identified as pits for storing grain. The enclosure itself has an area of about 0.3 hectares (0.74 acres) with an entrance on the west side.

=== Barrow cemetery and lynchets ===
The barrow cemetery originally consisted of six barrows, one of which had been destroyed before Pitt Rivers started his excavation. Their diameters were 7 to 17.2 metres (23 to 56 ft) and heights 0.4 to 2.6 metres (1 ft 4 in to 8 ft 6 in). There were at least 24 cremations, placed in pits beneath the mounds. Three barrows were partially re-excavated in 1978.

Lynchets of the original field system, up to 0.75 metres (2 ft 6 in) high, surround the enclosure and barrows; they would have once have extended further. As a result of the 1977–1981 excavation, it is thought that the field system developed after the cemetery was created; the cemetery was in use over a long period, continuing after the enclosure was built. The site was occupied, according to radiocarbon dating, from about 1250 BC to 1050 BC.

== Pitt Rivers excavations ==
Other archaeological sites on Cranborne Chase excavated by Pitt Rivers include the Martin Down Enclosure, Rotherley Down Settlement, Woodcutts Settlement and Wor Barrow.
