= Rotherley Down Settlement =

English archaeological site

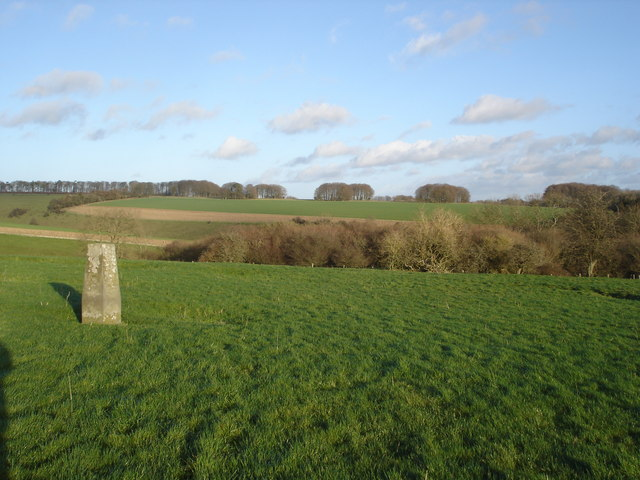
- Stone within the earthworks, recording the findings of Pitt Rivers during the excavation

- Location within Wiltshire
- 50°58′29″N 2°4′26″W
- Periods: Bronze Age; Iron Age; Romano-British
- Location: near Tollard Royal
- OS grid reference: ST 949 195

Site notes
- Area: 2 hectares (4.9 acres)
- Excavation dates: 1885–1886
- Archaeologists: Augustus Pitt Rivers

Scheduled monument
- Designated: 10 April 1957
- Reference no.: 1020963

Rotherley Down Settlement is an archaeological site of the late Iron Age and Romano-British period on Cranborne Chase, England. It is about 1.5 miles (2.4 km) south of Berwick St John, and 1 mile (1.6 km) north of Tollard Royal, in Wiltshire, near the boundary with Dorset. It is a scheduled monument.

== Description ==
The site, on the brow of a hill at Rotherley Down, has an area of about 2 hectares (4.9 acres).

Augustus Pitt Rivers, inheritor of the Rushmore Estate, where he was resident from 1880, investigated many prehistoric monuments on his estate. He excavated the site at Rotherley Down from 1885 to 1886; what is seen today is his partial reconstruction. He erected a stone monument at the centre of the site, on which his findings are described.

The site was found to be similar to Woodcutts Settlement, which he had excavated earlier. It was occupied from the first century BC to the third century AD. There is a large circular enclosure within a bank and ditch, with storage pits inside. Nearby are banks and ditches, indicating the remains of houses, storage pits and enclosures. Particular features of a later phase, in the Roman period, have been discerned, including a corn drying oven, a large rectangular building, and a stock enclosure outside the main enclosure.

A burial from the Bronze Age was found, containing a crouched skeleton and a beaker. Stone implements from the Neolithic and Bronze Age were found.

Bones from burials at the site from the main occupation period were measured, and were found to be smaller than those discovered elsewhere on Cranborne Chase; this suggested to Pitt Rivers that the inhabitants here were in "a lower condition of life". It has since been considered that the sample size was too small for the differences to be significant.

== Excavations by Pitt Rivers ==
Other archaeological sites on Cranborne Chase excavated by Pitt Rivers include the Martin Down Enclosure, South Lodge Camp, Woodcutts Settlement and Wor Barrow.
