= Oakley Down Barrow Cemetery =

Archaeological site in Dorset, UK

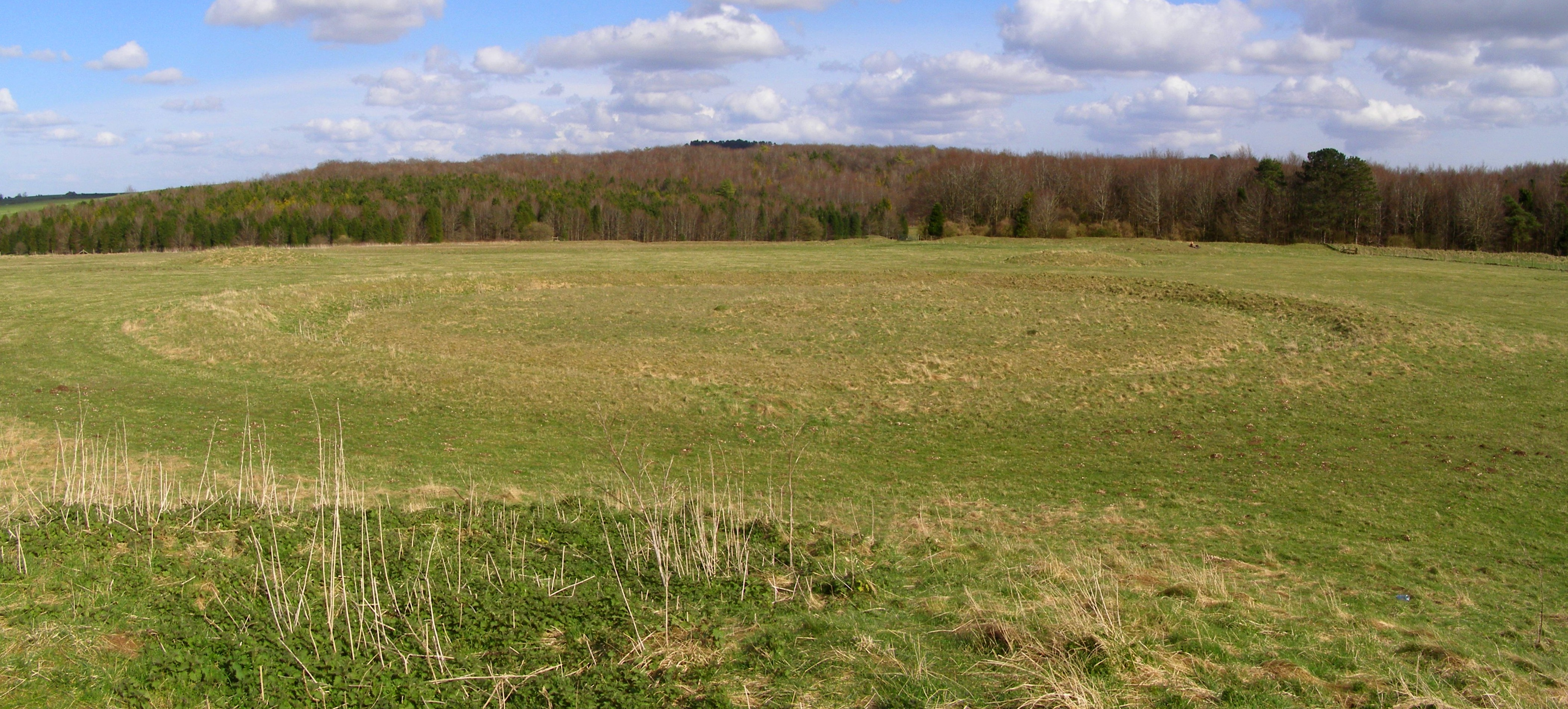
- One of the disc barrows

- Location within Dorset
- 50°57′15″N 1°58′31″W
- Periods: Bronze Age
- Location: near Sixpenny Handley, Dorset
- OS grid reference: SU 018 172

Site notes
- Excavation dates: Early 19th century
- Archaeologists: Sir Richard Colt Hoare and William Cunnington

Scheduled monument
- Designated: 15 October 1924
- Reference no.: 1002674

Oakley Down Barrow Cemetery is a group of Bronze Age round barrows on Cranborne Chase, about 1 mile (1.6 km) east of the village of Sixpenny Handley in Dorset, England. It is a scheduled monument.

== Description ==
There are many prehistoric remains on Cranborne Chase from the Neolithic and Early Bronze Age. The presence of Wor Barrow, a Neolithic long barrow nearby to the west, may have been influential in the construction of the Oakley Down cemetery.

There are about 30 barrows. Most of them are in the angle between the A354 road and the Ackling Dyke Roman road. The main group includes bowl barrows of diameter 11–26 metres (36–85 ft) and height 0.3–3.4 metres (1 ft 0 in – 11 ft 2 in); five or six disc barrows of diameter 12–29 metres (39–95 ft); also two oval barrows and a bell barrow.

There is a smaller group to the north, of four bowl barrows and a bell barrow.

=== Excavation ===
Many of the barrows were excavated in the early 19th century by Sir Richard Colt Hoare and William Cunnington; the barrows investigated can be identified from Hoare's numbered plan.

The barrows contained primary and secondary inhumations, and primary and secondary cremations in urns and cists. Grave goods included beads of amber, glass and faience, and bronze daggers. Some of the finds were later placed in Devizes Museum.

A partial excavation in 1970 of one bowl barrow revealed a posthole close to its edge, near a pit containing cremated bone and ash; this may have been a support for a cremation pyre.
