= Thundersbarrow Hill =

Hillfort in West Sussex, England

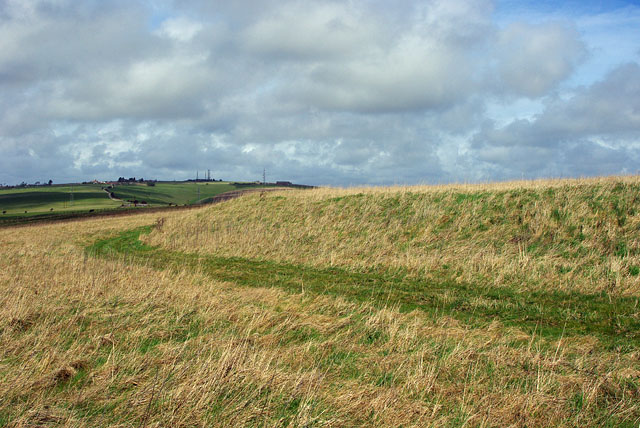
- Looking north along the west side of the hillfort

- Location within West Sussex
- 50°51′43″N 0°15′17″W
- Periods: Bronze Age; Iron Age; Romano-British
- Location: West Sussex, near Shoreham-by-Sea
- OS grid reference: TQ 228 084

Scheduled monument
- Designated: 26 March 1934
- Reference no.: 1015124

Thundersbarrow Hill is an archaeological site in West Sussex, England. It is on a chalk ridge, aligned north-west to south-east, on the South Downs north of Shoreham-by-Sea.

There is an Iron Age hillfort; also a bowl barrow and a Martin Down style enclosure of the Bronze Age; and traces of a Romano-British farming village. The site is a scheduled monument.

== Description ==
There was some excavation in 1932 by E. C. Curwen, and in 1985 by D. Rudling.

=== Hillfort ===
The univallate fort, area about 1.33 hectares (3.3 acres), is roughly circular; the east side has been much affected by ploughing, but the western side has a bank up to 1 metre (3 ft 3 in) high. There was originally an outer ditch of width about 7 metres (23 ft), now filled in. There are entrances at the north and south-east. Analysis of pottery sherds have shown that the fort was constructed in the 6th century BC and in use until the mid 3rd century BC.

=== Martin Down style enclosure ===
Inside the fort is a Martin Down style enclosure, so named after the Bronze Age enclosure on Martin Down in Hampshire, interpreted as a domestic settlement. It is roughly square, with sides of about 70 metres (230 ft) and area about 0.49 hectares (1.2 acres), almost levelled by ploughing. There are two original entrances on the west and east sides, about 6 metres (20 ft) wide. From analysis of pottery sherds from the (now infilled) ditch, it is thought that the enclosure was in use in the 10th and 9th centuries BC.

=== Barrow ===
About 10 metres (33 ft) south-east of the fort is the Bronze Age bowl barrow, known as Thunders Barrow. It was disturbed by the creation of a dew pond in 1873 and by earth-moving in 1964; a semi-circular mound remains, about 17 metres (56 ft) in diameter and height up to 2 metres (6 ft 7 in).

=== Romano-British village ===
To the east and north of the fort are the buried remains of a Romano-British village. Excavation in 1932 found rectangular houses, dimensions about 5 metres (16 ft) by 3.5 metres (11 ft); coins and sherds of pottery were found, of date AD 50 to 400. On the southern, western and eastern sides of the ridge, over an area of about 40 hectares (99 acres), a field system contemporary with the Romano-British village can be discerned from earthworks up to 0.5 metres (1 ft 8 in) high and by crop marks visible from the air. The mainly rectangular fields have an average area of about 0.35 hectares (0.86 acres).
