= Ackling Dyke =

Section of Roman road in England

Coordinates: 50.9388°N 1.9844°W

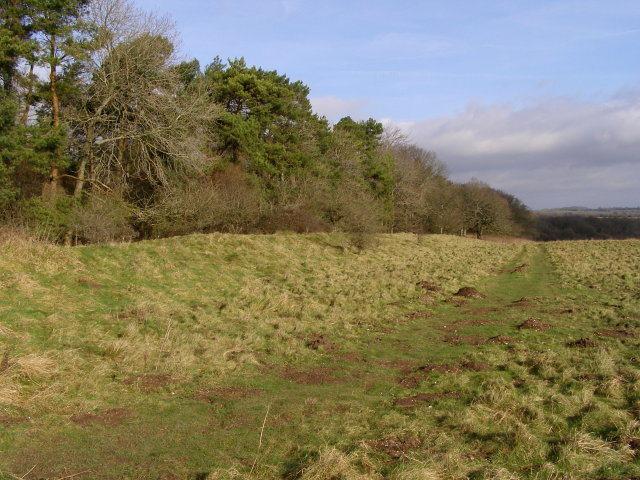
Ackling Dyke on the Hampshire/Wiltshire border

Ackling Dyke is a section of Roman road in England which runs for 22 miles (35 km) southwest from Old Sarum (Sorviodunum) to the hill fort at Badbury Rings (Vindocladia). Part of the road on Oakley Down has been scheduled as an ancient monument.

Much of the road exists as an exceptionally large embankment (agger), up to 50 ft (15 m) wide and 6 ft (1.8 m) high. This is much wider than most Roman roads. This would have been visible from a great distance and must have been intended to impress the native population, as it was unnecessary from an engineering viewpoint. It provided a rapid transit route for soldiers across Cranborne Chase.

In addition, in places the road cuts straight through prehistoric earthworks and barrows, showing the Roman attitude to the existing British social structure as well as proving to early antiquaries that barrows preceded the Roman period. At Bokerley Junction it cuts through both Bokerley Dyke and Grim's Ditch before being overlaid by a turnpike, now the A354. Three miles (5 km) further west at Wyke Down it cuts through the Dorset Cursus. A series of watchtower sites have been identified along the route.

After leaving the Salisbury suburbs, the route crosses open country throughout, and nowhere comes close to any settlement. Apart from a one-mile (1.6 km) section of the main Salisbury–Blandford road which follows its course, the road can mostly be followed along minor lanes and tracks.

At Old Sarum the road connected with the Port Way to Silchester (Calleva Atrebatum) and London; and from Badbury Rings roads led to the harbour at Hamworthy (Moriconium) and to Dorchester (Durnovaria).

Part of the road is on the Heritage at Risk Register because of the potential damage from arable ploughing.

== See also ==
- Roman roads in Britain
