= Horace Pitt-Rivers, 6th Baron Rivers =

British peer and army officer

Horace Pitt-Rivers, 6th Baron Rivers (12 April 1814 – 3 March 1880), known as Horace Beckford until 1828 and Hon. Horace Pitt from 1828 until 1867, was a British peer and army officer.

He was born on 12 April 1814 in London, the younger son of Horace Beckford and his wife Frances, and was baptised on 11 May at St George's, Hanover Square. Beckford, as he then was, was educated at Harrow School from 1824 to 1826 and then at the Royal Military College, Sandhurst. In 1828, his father inherited the Pitt estates and the title of Baron Rivers by a special remainder, and adopted the surname of Pitt for his younger son.

On 27 February 1830, Pitt (as he now was) bought a cornetcy in the Royal Horse Guards vacated by Viscount Fordwich. On 6 July 1832, he bought a lieutenancy vacated by George Weld-Forester and on 11 November 1836, a captaincy vacated by Lord Elphinstone.

On 10 April 1845, at Brighton, he married Eleanor Sutor. No children were born of the marriage. She was a courtesan of the Regency period under the name of "Nellie Holmes", and had lived with Pitt before the marriage. (See Harriette Wilson for context.) They agreed to separate in 1846.

Pitt was breveted a major in the Army on 9 November 1846, and purchased a substantive majority vacated by Weld-Forester on 2 September 1853, receiving a brevet lieutenant-colonelcy from the same date. He retired from the Army on 21 April 1854, having been forced to sell his commission due to his gambling and horse-racing debts. He then spent a number of years in hiding from his creditors, living at Soval on the Isle of Lewis and then from 1858 at Kilninver. He attempted to obtain a divorce from his wife, but without success; the House of Lords held that he had not become domiciled in Scotland, and was therefore unable to take advantage of the more liberal Scottish divorce laws.

In 1867, Pitt succeeded his sickly nephew Henry in the Pitt estates and the title of Baron Rivers, and assumed the surname of Pitt-Rivers. He was a Conservative in politics. His first wife died on 3 September 1872, at Broxbourne, and on 26 June 1873 he married Emmeline Laura, a daughter of Captain John Pownall William Bastard and a granddaughter of Captain John Bastard. There were no children from his second marriage.

He died on 3 March 1880 at 23 Wilton Crescent, London and was buried at Steepleton Iwerne. The peerage became extinct upon his death. His estates were inherited by a second cousin, Augustus Lane-Fox, who adopted the surname of Pitt Rivers/Pitt-Rivers in consequence. In 1881 his widow married Montague George Thorold (d. 1920), second son of Sir John Thorold, 11th Baronet, and died on 1 October 1918.

Peerage of the United Kingdom
Preceded by Henry Pitt-Rivers	Baron Rivers; 1867–1880	Extinct
