= Littleton and Harestock =

Civil parish in Hampshire, England

Coordinates: 51.086°N 1.349°W

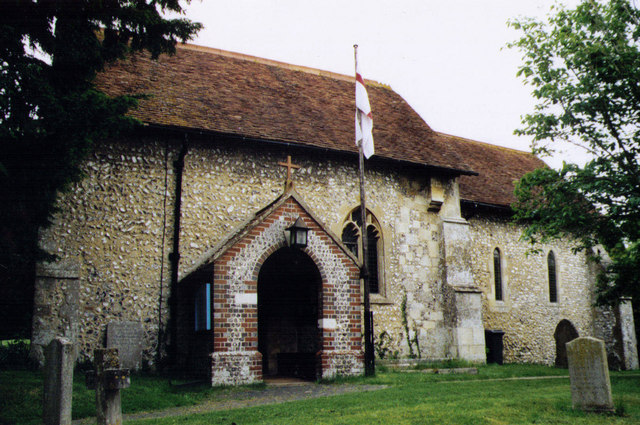
- St Catherine's church, Littleton

- Location within Hampshire
- Population: 3,577
- OS grid reference: SU4532
- Civil parish: Littleton and Harestock
- District: City of Winchester
- Shire county: Hampshire
- Region: South East
- Country: England
- Sovereign state: United Kingdom
- Post town: WINCHESTER
- Postcode district: SO22
- Dialling code: 01962
- Police: Hampshire and Isle of Wight
- Fire: Hampshire and Isle of Wight
- Ambulance: South Central
- UK Parliament: Winchester
- Website: https://lhpc.org.uk/

Littleton and Harestock is a civil parish consisting of the villages of Littleton and Harestock in the City of Winchester district of Hampshire, England. The population of the civil parish at the 2011 Census was 3,577.

Littleton is slightly north-west of Harestock, and is roughly 3 miles (4.8 km) north-west of Winchester city centre. The parish is 1,300 acres (5.3 km^{2}) in size, and has around 2,800 electors.

== Notable buildings ==
=== Old houses ===
Littleton was originally a small hamlet outside Winchester and still retains half a dozen houses dating from the fifteenth and sixteenth centuries; some of them are Hampshire Hall houses. They are clustered around St Catherine's church, and include the old parsonage beside the church. Later development of housing began chiefly in the early twentieth century.

=== Old Memorial Hall ===
It was decided after the end of the First World War to build a village hall in Littleton, which was to be dedicated to the residents of the village who had been killed during the war. The Memorial Hall was opened in October 1923 and remained the focus of the village for over 70 years. However, over this time the population of the village grew steadily, and in the 1990s it became clear that the hall could no longer meet the requirements of the residents. At a meeting in 1995 it was decided that a new hall would be built.

=== New Memorial Hall ===
The construction of the new hall began in July 1998 and the building was completed in February of the following year. The official opening took place on 15 May 1999, although the first event in the hall, a professional performance of Macbeth, occurred two months earlier.

== Governance ==
Littleton and Harestock are part of the Wonston and Micheldever Ward which elects three councillors to Winchester City Council, as well as the wider Winchester Downlands ward which elects a councillor to Hampshire County Council.
