= Woodcutts Settlement =

Archaeological site of the late Iron Age period

- The interior of the enclosure

- Location within Dorset
- 50°57′45″N 2°3′12″W
- Periods: Iron Age; Romano-British
- Location: near Sixpenny Handley, Dorset
- OS grid reference: ST 964 181

Site notes
- Area: 1.6 hectares (4.0 acres)
- Excavation dates: 1884–1885
- Archaeologists: Augustus Pitt Rivers

Scheduled monument
- Designated: 10 April 1957
- Reference no.: 1020629

Woodcutts Settlement is an archaeological site of the late Iron Age and Romano-British period on Cranborne Chase, England. It is situated about 1 mile (1.6 km) north of the hamlet of Woodcutts, and about 1.75 miles (2.8 km) north-west of the village of Sixpenny Handley, in Dorset, near the boundary with Wiltshire. It is a scheduled monument.

== Description ==
The site, on Woodcutts Common, has an area of about 1.6 hectares (4.0 acres). There was probably a single farmstead here. Before excavation, there was a roughly circular enclosure, defined by a low bank with an external ditch, about 300 feet (91 m) in diameter. Within was a mound, two rectangular depressions and two circular hollows. Outside this enclosure were three smaller enclosures, and two trackways, about 20 feet (6.1 m) wide, leading away on the north-west and south-east sides.

=== Excavations ===
There was limited excavation in 1863 by J. H. Austen, of features in the main enclosure.

Augustus Pitt Rivers, inheritor of the Rushmore Estate, where he was resident from 1880, investigated many prehistoric monuments on his estate. He excavated the site at Woodcutts in 1884 and 1885. The main enclosure, and two of the outer enclosures, were totally excavated. The site was afterwards partially reconstructed, the earth cleared from the ditch of the main enclosure being used to heighten the bank. He published his findings in 1887.

Pitt Rivers was aware that the site had changed during a long period of occupation. His results were interpreted about 50 years later by Christopher Hawkes, who established that there were three phases of development.

Originally, in the early 1st century AD, there was a roughly circular enclosure about 300 feet (91 m) in diameter, with wide entrances, and trackways leading away. There was a building within the main enclosure. In the second phase, during the late 2nd century AD, the three outer enclosures were built, one on the west and two on the east, of which one contained two corn-drying ovens. In the third phase, in the early 4th century AD, a new enclosure was constructed (seen before excavation began), partly over the sites of the earlier main and western enclosure. This enclosure contained a well and a building with painted wattle walls. The eastern enclosures were retained, one of them being enlarged. A new enclosure, containing a corn-drying oven, was constructed on the north side.

Finds from the excavation included pottery, metal objects (including pins, spoons, harness, knives and ploughshare-tips) and coins. Pottery and coins indicated occupation until about 360. Finds were later placed in the Dorset Museum and the Wiltshire Museum.

== Excavations by Pitt Rivers ==
Other sites on Cranborne Chase excavated by Pitt Rivers include the Martin Down Enclosure, Rotherley Down Settlement, South Lodge Camp and Wor Barrow.
