= Augustus Pitt Rivers =

English army officer, ethnologist and archaeologist

Lieutenant-General Augustus Pitt Rivers FRS FSA FRAI
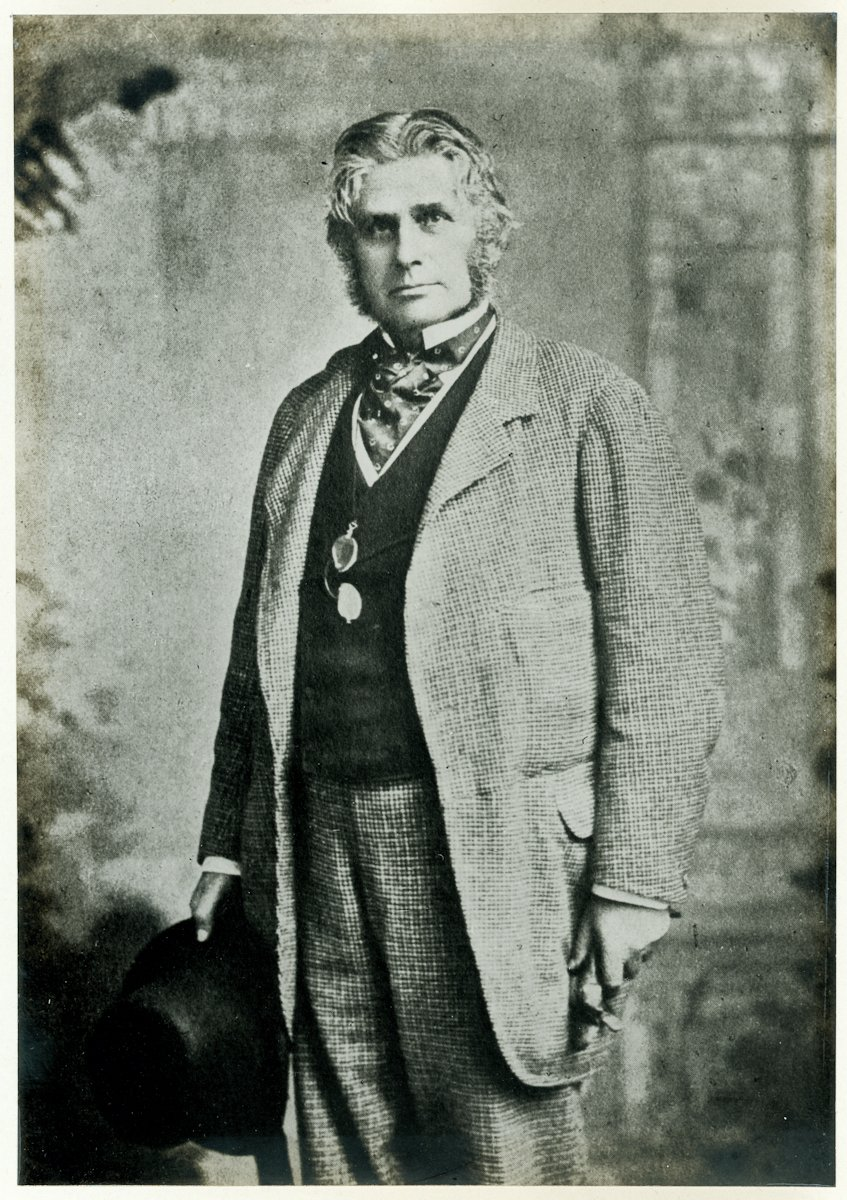
- Born: Augustus Henry Lane Fox; 14 April 1827; Bramham cum Oglethorpe, Yorkshire, England
- Died: 4 May 1900 (aged 73); Rushmore Estate, Wiltshire, England
- Scientific career
- Fields: Ethnology, archaeology
- Military career
- Allegiance: United Kingdom
- Branch: British Army
- Service years: 1845–1882
- Rank: Lieutenant-General
- Conflicts: Crimean War: Battle of Alma

Lieutenant-General Augustus Henry Lane Fox Pitt Rivers (born Augustus Henry Lane-Fox; 14 April 1827 – 4 May 1900) was an English officer in the British Army, ethnologist, and archaeologist. He was noted for innovations in archaeological methodology, and in the museum display of archaeological and ethnological collections. His international collection of about 22,000 objects was the founding collection of the Pitt Rivers Museum at the University of Oxford, while his collection of English archaeology from the area around Stonehenge forms the basis of the collection at The Salisbury Museum in Wiltshire.

Throughout most of his life he used the surname Lane Fox, under which his early archaeological reports are published. In 1880 he adopted the Pitt Rivers name on inheriting from Lord Rivers (a cousin) an estate of more than 32,000 acres in Cranborne Chase.

His family name is often spelled as "Pitt-Rivers". His middle name is sometimes spelled as "Lane-Fox". The surname he adopted following the Royal Licence was Fox-Pitt-Rivers.

== Early life and family ==
Born at Bramham cum Oglethorpe near Wetherby in Yorkshire, he was the son of William Lane-Fox and Lady Caroline Douglas, sister of George Douglas, 17th Earl of Morton. The politicians George Lane-Fox and Sackville Lane-Fox were his uncles.

On 3 February 1853, Pitt-Rivers (still under the surname Fox) married The Honourable Alice Margaret Stanley (1828–1910), daughter of the politician Edward Stanley, 2nd Baron Stanley of Alderley and of the women's education campaigner Henrietta Stanley, Baroness Stanley of Alderley. Alice had a slew of siblings active in the public issues of the day, several of whom married into prominent families. The Pitt Rivers Museum suggests that some of the founding collection, particularly some Indian items, may have come from John Constantine Stanley (1837–1878), younger brother of Alice.

In 1880, Lane Fox inherited the estates of his cousin, Horace Pitt-Rivers, 6th Baron Rivers and with it the remainder of the Richard Rigby fortune. It was "an event that transformed his life". He was required to adopt the surname Pitt-Rivers as part of the bequest 'either alone or in addition to his or their surname'.

== Descendants ==
Augustus and Alice had nine children who reached adulthood; they were born between 1855 and 1866. As they were all born before Augustus took the new surname in 1880, their births are registered under the name of Fox (or Lane-Fox).

1. Alexander Edward Lane Fox-Pitt-Rivers, 2 November 1855 – 19 August 1927, married Alice Ruth Hermione Thynne.
2. St George Lane Fox-Pitt, 14 September 1856 – 6 April 1932, electrical engineer, author, and student of psychic phenomena.
3. William Augustus Lane Fox-Pitt, 9 January 1858 – 1945?.
4. Ursula Katharine Lane Fox-Pitt, 1859? – 1942.
5. Lionel Charles Lane Fox-Pitt, 5 November 1860 – 1937?.
6. Alice Augusta Laurentia Lane Fox-Pitt, circa 1862 – 11 March 1947, married John Lubbock, 1st Baron Avebury.
7. Agnes Geraldine Fox-Pitt, 25 July 1863 – 7 December 1926.
8. Douglas Henry Lane Fox-Pitt, 17 December 1864 – 19 September 1922.
9. Arthur Algernon Lane Fox-Pitt, 12 April 1866 – 6 November 1895.

Augustus' descendants include his grandson, anthropologist, eugenicist, and anti-Semite George Pitt-Rivers, who was interned in 1940 under Defence Regulation 18B. George's children included Michael Pitt-Rivers, and his brother, anthropologist and ethnographer Julian A. Pitt-Rivers. A further generation includes Augustus's great-great-grandson, equestrian William Fox-Pitt.

Darcy–Lane–Fox–Pitt–Rivers family tree

Baron Darcy of Chiche, 1551
Thomas Darcy; 1506–1558; 1st Baron Darcy of Chiche
John Darcy c. 1532–1580/1581; 2nd Baron Darcy of Chiche
Viscount Colchester, 1621; Earl Rivers (2nd creation), 1626
Thomas Darcy; 1565–1640; 1st Earl Rivers, etc. 3rd Baron Darcy of Chiche
Earl Rivers (3rd creation) and Viscount Colchester, 1641 (for life)	Viscount Savage and Baron Darcy of Chiche, 1613
Elizabeth Savage; 1581–1650; Countess Savage, etc.	Thomas Savage d. 1635; 1st Viscount Savage, etc.
Earldom of Rivers (3rd creation) extinct, 1641
John Savage; 1603–1654; 2nd Earl Rivers, etc. 2nd Viscount Savage, etc.
Richard Lane d. 1668; 1st Baronet	George Pitt d. 1694	Jane Savage d. 1676	Thomas Savage; 1628–1694; 3rd Earl Rivers; 3rd Viscount Savage, etc.	Richard Savage
Viscount Lanesborough (1st creation), 1676
George Lane c. 1620–1683; 1st Viscount Lanesborough	George Pitt d. 1735	Richard Savage d. 1712; 4th Earl Rivers; 4th Viscount Savage, etc.	John Savage; 1665–1737; 5th Earl Rivers; 5th Viscount Savage, etc.
Baron Bingley (1st creation), 1713	Earldom of Rivers (2nd creation) and Viscount Savage and subsidiary titles extinct, 1737
Robert Benson c. 1676–1731; Baron Bingley	James Lane; 1650–1724; 2nd Viscount Lanesborough	Frances Lane d. 1674	Henry Fox; 1650-1719	George Pitt d. 1745
Barony of Bingley (1st creation) extinct, 1731	Viscountcy of Lanesborough (1st creation) extinct, 1724
Baron Bingley (2nd creation), 1763	Baron Rivers (3rd creation), 1776; Baron Rivers (4th creation), 11802
Harriet Benson d. 1771	George Fox-Lane c. 1697–1773; 1st Baron Bingley	Sackville Fox d. 1760	George Pitt; 1721–1803; 1st Baron Rivers
Robert Lane; 1732–1768; 2nd Baron Bingley	James Fox-Lane; 1756–1821	Marcia Lucy Pitt; 1756–1822	George Pitt; 1751–1828; 2nd Baron Rivers	Louisa Pitt d. 1791	Peter Beckford; 1740–1811
Barony of Bingley (2nd creation) extinct, 1768	Barony of Rivers (3rd creation) extinct but 4th creation continued, 1828
George Lane-Fox; 1793–1848	William Augustus Pitt Lane-Fox; 1796–1832	Sackville Lane-Fox; 1797–1874	William Horace Pitt-Rivers; 1777–1831; 3rd Baron Rivers
George Lane-Fox; 1816–1896	Augustus Pitt Rivers; 1827–1900	Sackville Lane-Fox; 1827–1888; 12th Baron Conyers	George Pitt-Rivers; 1810–1866; 4th Baron Rivers	Horace Pitt-Rivers; 1814–1880; 6th Baron Rivers
Barony of Rivers (4th creation) extinct, 1880
James Thomas Richard Lane-Fox; 1841–1906	Alexander Edward Lane Fox-Pitt-Rivers; 1855–1927	St George Lane Fox-Pitt; 1856–1932	William Augustus Lane Fox-Pitt b. 1858	Douglas Fox-Pitt; 1864–1922	Marcia Pelham; 1863–1926; 13th Baroness Conyers, Baroness Fauconberg	Violet Herbert; 1865–1929; Baroness Darcy de Knayth	Henry Peter Pitt-Rivers; 1849–1867; 5th Baron Rivers
Baron Bingley (3rd creation), 1933
George Lane-Fox; 1870–1947; 1st Baron Bingley	Edward Lane-Fox; 1874–1949	Emily Rachel Forster d. 1979	George Pitt-Rivers; 1890–1966	Rosalind Pitt-Rivers; 1907–1990	William Augustus Fitzgerald Lane Fox-Pitt; 1896–1988
Barony of Bingley (3rd creation) extinct, 1947
Baroness Lane-Fox, of Bramham in the County of West Yorkshire, 1981 (for life)
Marcia Agnes Mary Lane-Fox; 1904–1980	Francis Lane Fox; 1899–1989	James Henry Lane-Fox b. 1912	Felicity Lane-Fox; 1918–1988; Baroness Lane-Fox	Michael Pitt-Rivers; 1917–1999	Julian Pitt-Rivers; 1919–2001	George Anthony Lane-Fox Pitt-Rivers b. 1932	Valerie Pitt-Rivers b. 1939	William Oliver Lane Fox-Pitt; 1932–2012
Barony of Lane-Fox extinct, 1988
George Francis Lane Fox; 1931–2012	Robin Lane Fox b. 1946	William Fox-Pitt b. 1969
Baroness Lane-Fox, of Soho in the City of Westminster, 2013 (for life)
Edward Lane Fox b. 1976	Martha Lane Fox b. 1973; Baroness Lane-Fox

== Military career ==
Lane Fox had a long and successful military career as a staff officer. He was educated at the Royal Military College, Sandhurst, for six months at the age of fourteen and was commissioned into the Grenadier Guards on 16 May 1845 as an ensign. In the course of a thirty-two-year military career, albeit much interrupted by leave, he only once saw major front line action, at the Battle of Alma in 1854. Soon after the battle, he was found unfit for active service and returned to England. In 1851 he became a member of the committee to experiment and report on the respective merits of the army's smoothbore muskets. He was appointed to Woolwich to instruct in the use of the new Minié rifle in 1852. Subsequently, he was largely responsible for founding the Hythe school of Musketry in Kent and became its principal instructor, revising its Instruction of Musketry manual. The remainder of his service career revolved around musketry instruction and in 1858 he published a paper On the improvement of the rifle as a weapon for general use. He bought a promotion to captain on 2 August 1850. He was promoted to the brevet rank of lieutenant-colonel of the army "for distinguished Service in the Field" during the Crimean War. On 15 May 1857, he bought the rank of lieutenant-colonel in the Grenadier Guards. The then brevet-major Lane Fox was appointed a member of the Fifth Class of the Order of the Medjidie in 1858 for "distinguished services before the enemy during the [Crimean War]". He was promoted to colonel on 22 January 1867 and major-general in 1877. Pitt Rivers retired in 1882 and was accorded the honorary rank of lieutenant-general.

== Archaeological career ==
Pitt Rivers' interests in archaeology and ethnology began in the 1850s, during postings overseas, and he became a noted scientist while he was a serving military officer. His interest began with the evolution of the rifle, which extended to other weapons and tools, and he became a collector of artefacts illustrating the development of human invention. His collection became famous, and, after being exhibited in 1874–1875 at the Bethnal Green Museum, London, was presented in 1885 to the University of Oxford. He was elected, in the space of five years, to the Ethnological Society of London (1861), the Society of Antiquaries of London (1864) and the Anthropological Society of London (1865).

In 1867, Pitt Rivers left full-time military service and went on half pay. The same year, he visited an archaeological excavation being carried out in the Yorkshire Wolds by Canon William Greenwell, librarian of Durham Cathedral and an established archaeologist, to whom he may have been introduced by mutual friends George Rolleston or Albert Way. Pitt Rivers received his first instruction in excavation from Greenwell, and later described himself as Greenwell's pupil. Greenwell viewed archaeology as a serious scholarly process of assembling evidence on periods which lacked written records, contrasted to the "ignorant and greedy spirit of mere curiosity-hunting"; views that would influence Pitt Rivers' own approach.

By the time he retired, he had amassed ethnographic collections numbering tens of thousands of items from all over the world. Influenced by the evolutionary writings of Charles Darwin and Herbert Spencer, he arranged them typologically and (within types) chronologically. He viewed archaeology as an extension of anthropology and, as consequence, built up matching collections of archaeological and ethnographic objects to show longer developmental sequences to support his views on cultural evolution. This style of arrangement, designed to highlight evolutionary trends in human artefacts, was a revolutionary innovation in museum design.

Pitt Rivers' ethnological collections form the basis of the Pitt Rivers Museum which is still one of Oxford's attractions. His researches and collections cover periods from the Lower Paleolithic to Roman and medieval times, and extend all over the world. The Pitt Rivers Museum curates more than half a million ethnographic and archaeological artefacts, photographic and manuscript collections from all parts of the world. The museum was founded in 1884 when the university accepted the gift of more than 20,000 artefacts from Pitt Rivers. The university awarded him the Doctorate of Civil Law in 1886, and he was later named a Fellow of the Royal Society. The collections continue to grow, and the museum has been described as one of the "six great ethnological museums of the world".

Pitt Rivers' Wessex Collection is housed in The Salisbury Museum, not far from Stonehenge. The Wessex Gallery of archaeology opened in 2014, funded by the Heritage Lottery Fund and other sources. Pitt Rivers and other early archaeologists such as William Stukeley who first investigated the prehistory of Wiltshire, Cranborne Chase, Avebury and Stonehenge, are celebrated in the gallery.

The estates Pitt Rivers inherited in 1880 contained a wealth of archaeological material from the Roman and Saxon periods. He excavated these over seventeen seasons, from the mid-1880s until his death. His approach was highly methodical by the standards of the time, and he is widely regarded as the first scientific archaeologist to work in Britain. His most important methodological innovation was his insistence that all artefacts, not just beautiful or unique ones, be collected and catalogued. This focus on everyday objects as the key to understanding the past broke decisively with earlier archaeological practice, which verged on treasure hunting. It is Pitt Rivers' most important, and most lasting, scientific legacy. His work inspired Mortimer Wheeler, among others, to add to the scientific approach of archaeological excavation techniques.

Following the passage of the Ancient Monuments Protection Act 1882, Pitt Rivers became the first Inspector of Ancient Monuments: a post created by anthropologist and parliamentarian John Lubbock who married Pitt Rivers' daughter, Alice. Charged with cataloguing archaeological sites and protecting them from destruction, he worked with his customary methodical zeal but was hampered by the limitations of the law, which gave him little real power over the landowners on whose property the sites stood. On the advice of Pitt-Rivers, Kit's Coty House and Little Kit's Coty House, Kent, were among the first ancient British remains to be protected by the state. Railings were erected around the stones there to prevent vandalism.

Pitt Rivers was a leading member of the Wiltshire Archaeological and Natural History Society, and was president of the society from 1890 to 1893.

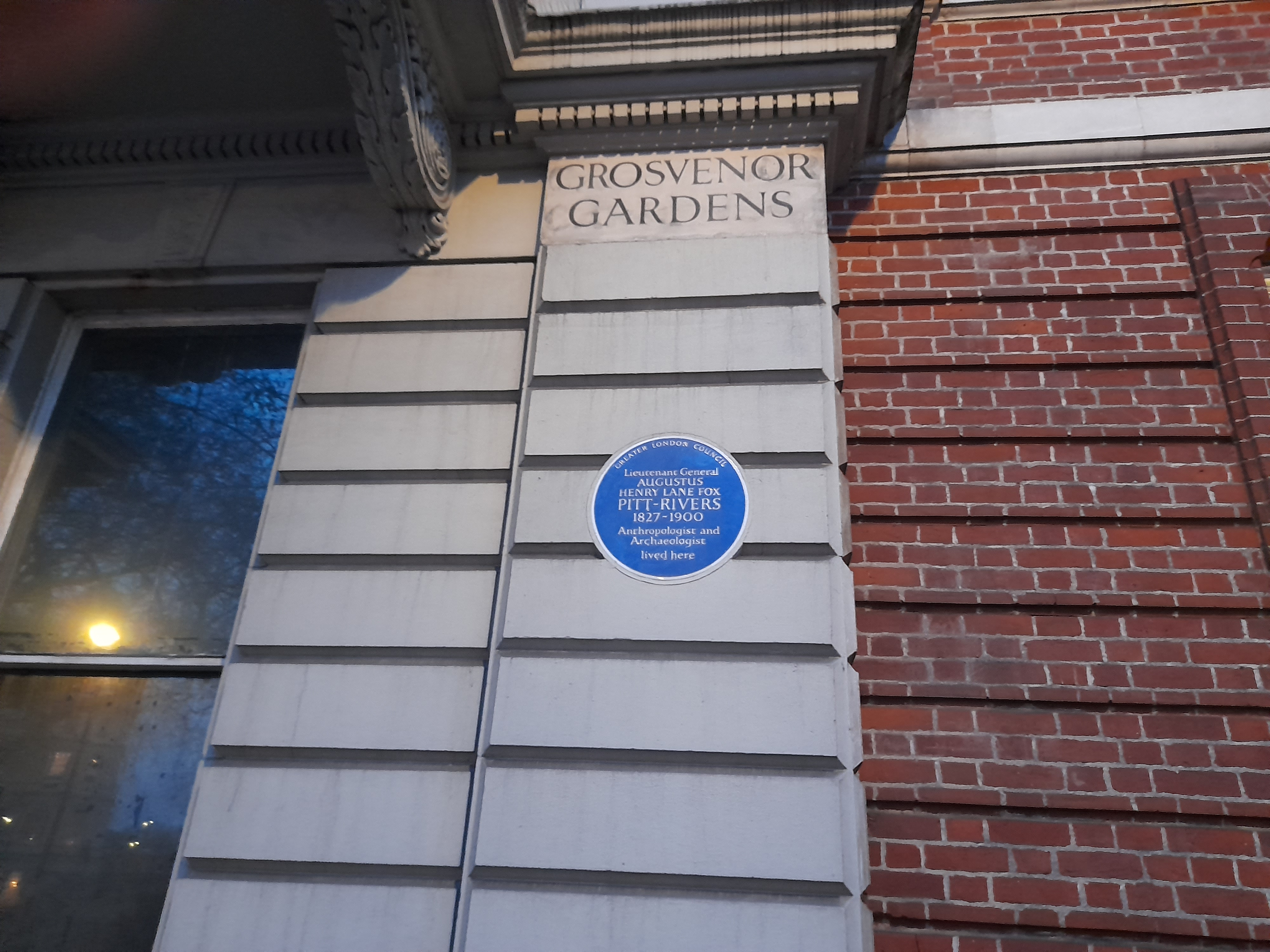
His Blue Plaque, Grosvenor Gardens, London, SW1.

== Other interests ==
The Rushmore estate near Tollard Royal in Wiltshire was part of his 1880 inheritance, and there he created the Larmer Tree Gardens, a pleasure garden which was opened to the public in 1885.

In 1884 he served as High Sheriff of Dorset.

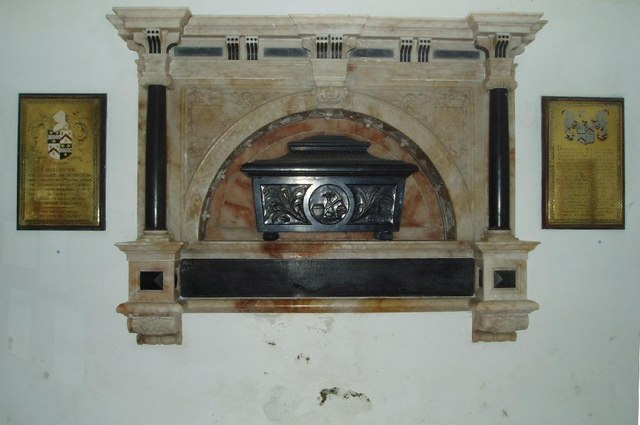
Memorial to Augustus Pitt Rivers in St Peter's Church at Tollard Royal

Pitt Rivers was an advocate for cremation. Even though many people believed that it was immoral to destroy a corpse, the cremation movement favoured a practical way to dispose of bodies. Pitt Rivers was cremated after his death in 1900.

== Bibliography ==
Among the publications of August Pitt Rivers are:

- Fox, Lane (1858). On the improvement of the rifle, as a weapon for general use. London: W. Clowes and Sons. OCLC 85009924 (all editions).
- Excavations on Cranborne Chase (4 volumes)
- Excavations on Bokerly and Wansdyke
