= Leslie Grinsell =

English archaeologist and museum curator

Leslie Valentine Grinsell
- Grinsell at the Museu Regional d'Arta, Mallorca in December 1979
- Born: 14 February 1907; London
- Died: 28 February 1995 (aged 88)
- Citizenship: United Kingdom
- Scientific career
- Fields: Archaeology

Leslie Valentine Grinsell OBE FSA (14 February 1907 – 28 February 1995) was an English archaeologist and museum curator. Publishing over twenty books on archaeology during his lifetime, he was renowned as a specialist on the prehistoric barrows of southern England.

Born in London and raised largely in Brighton, Grinsell developed an early interest in archaeology through visits to Brighton Museum. Later working as a bank clerk in London, he embarked on archaeological research in an amateur capacity, visiting prehistoric barrows during his weekends and holidays to record their shape, dimensions, and location. On the basis of his research, he published a range of academic articles and books on barrows during the 1930s, gaining recognition as Britain's foremost expert on the subject. In 1933, he carried out his only archaeological excavation, at the Devil's Humps in Sussex.

During the Second World War he joined the Royal Air Force and served in Egypt, where he acquainted himself with the archaeological remains of Ancient Egyptian society; after the war he published a book on the Egyptian pyramids. On his return to Britain, Grinsell became the treasurer of the Prehistoric Society, a position that he held from 1947 till 1970. Moving to Devizes, in 1949 he entered the archaeological profession as an assistant to Christopher Hawkes and Stuart Piggott at the Victoria County History project. From 1952 to 1972, Grinsell worked as Keeper of Anthropology and Archaeology at Bristol City Museum, during which time he continued his examination of barrows, focusing on those in south-west England. On retirement, he was appointed to the Order of the British Empire and a festschrift was published in his honour.

Over the course of his lifetime, Grinsell examined and catalogued around 10,000 barrows and advanced the archaeological understanding of such monuments. His use of non-excavatory fieldwork influenced much British archaeology in the latter part of his 20th century, while his willingness to pay attention to other sources of information, such as folklore and place-names, has been deemed ahead of its time.

== Biography ==
=== Early life: 1907–1945 ===
Grinsell was born at Hornsey, London on 14 February 1907, the younger son of Arthur John Grinsell, a silversmith's manager, and Janet Christine (née Tabor). His family moved to Brighton early in 1918, when Zeppelin raids during the First World War were increasing; there, his interest in archaeology was encouraged by H. S. Toms, the curator of Brighton Museum who had formerly been an assistant to the archaeologist Augustus Pitt Rivers. Grinsell was educated at St John's College, Hurstpierpoint until July 1919, in September returning with his family to London, where they lived at Crouch End, and attending the private Oakfield School there until January 1921, when he entered Highgate School, where he studied until July 1923. Grinsell attended the Pitman School at Southampton Row, then matriculated at the University of London before in 1925 becoming a clerk for Barclays Bank, where he would work until 1949. Although he had developed his interest in prehistory through an examination of stone tools, he came to focus his attention on barrows, recognising that these were among the least well understood prehistoric monuments in the British landscape and one of the few that could be studied from the position of an amateur. At the time, a number of antiquarians were still active in southern England, with Grinsell being encouraged in his interests by prominent figures in this milieu such as Eliot Curwen and Hadrian Allcroft.

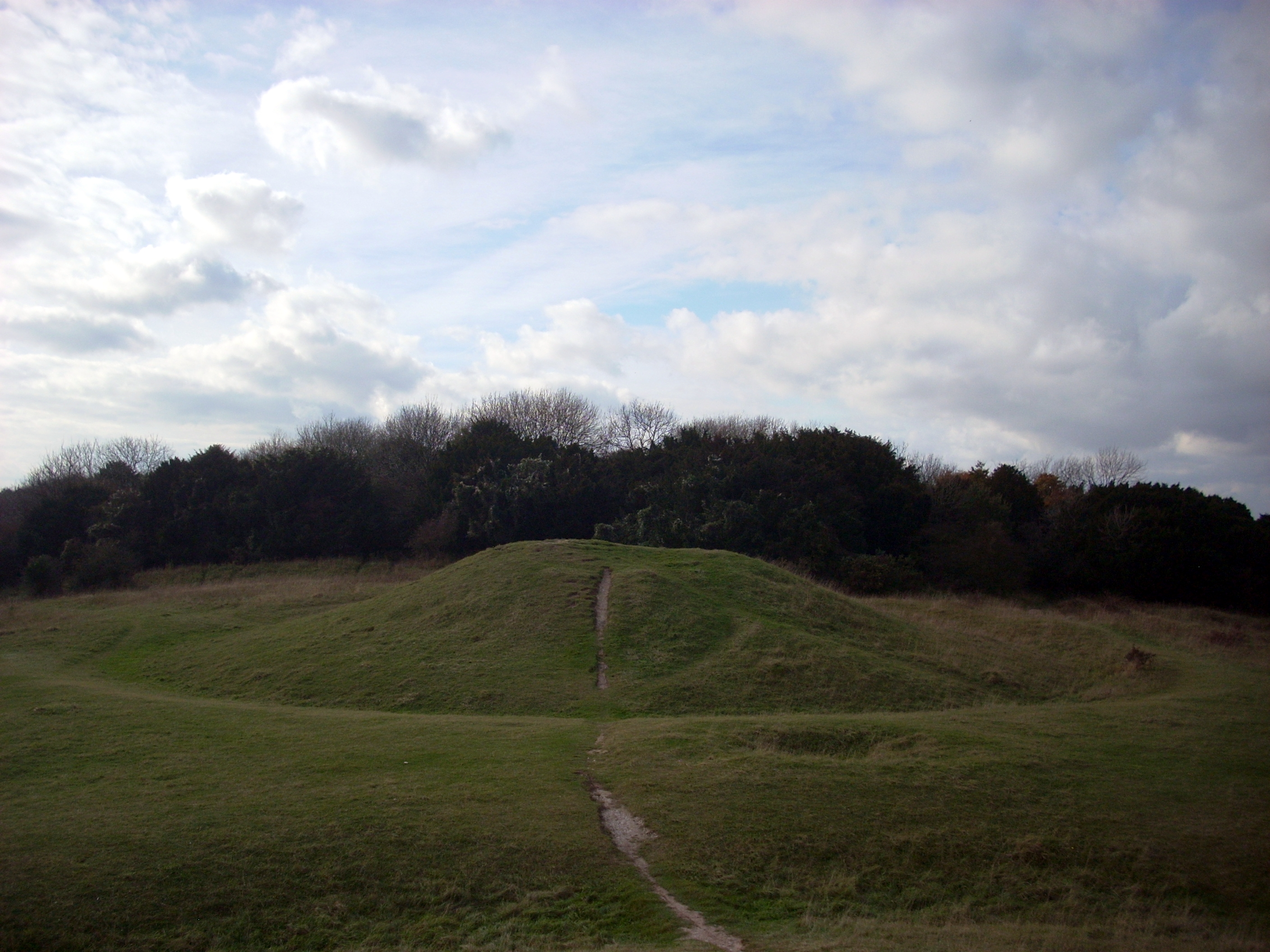
Grinsell's only excavation was of one of the Devil's Humps (pictured) in Sussex

Grinsell's techniques of conducting archaeological fieldwork were entirely self-taught, and from the start of his investigations he was very interested in understanding both the distribution and the chronology of the barrows. During the 1930s, Grinsell personally visited and catalogued all of the extant barrows in the counties of Surrey, Sussex, Berkshire, Hampshire, and the Isle of Wight, establishing himself as the "pre-eminent" figure in the study of British barrows. The archaeologist Nicholas Thomas later noted that despite Grinsell's status as an amateur, by 1932 he had established himself as being "without parallel" in British archaeology, with his accomplishments surpassing even the work of professionals like O. G. S. Crawford. Never having learned to drive, Grinsell conducted all his visits through the use of buses, trains, and on foot.

In 1932 Grinsell attended the First International Prehistoric Congress, held in London; it was here that he was introduced to Crawford, with the two becoming close acquaintances, both sharing an interest in the use of maps as part of their archaeological fieldwork. It was also here that he met the Dutch archaeologist Albert Egges van Giffen; they discussed whether the bell barrows of Sussex were related to the palisade barrows of the Netherlands which van Giffen had been investigating. Seeking an answer to this question, Grinsell conducted his only excavation, an examination of one of several bell barrows – collectively known as the known as the Devil's Humps – atop Bow Hill in Sussex. Conducted in April 1933 with the help of two members of the Brighton and Hove Archaeological Society, publication of the results was delayed until 1942. In 1936 he published The Ancient Burial Mounds of England, and then followed this with The Bronze Age Round Barrows of Wessex in 1941.

Around 1937 he met the painter and amateur archaeologist Heywood Sumner while conducting an exploration of the barrows of Hampshire, with his own hand-drawn plans of barrows becoming influenced by Sumner's illustrative style. With the archaeologist R. F. Jessup he began conducting a survey of the barrows in Kent, although their notes for this were later destroyed in an air raid during the Second World War before they could be published. With the archaeologist R. Rainbird Clarke he then conducted a survey of the barrows of Norfolk; their findings were stored in an archive although never published.

After the outbreak of the Second World War, Grinsell became a Pilot Officer in the Air Photographic Branch of the Royal Air Force (RAF) in 1941. During the conflict, he was stationed in Egypt, where he spent time studying the archaeological remains of Ancient Egypt and visiting all of the pyramids near to Cairo. Based on these experiences, at his own expense he published Egyptian Pyramids in 1947. Designed as a guide to the sites, it was (as Grinsell acknowledged) heavily reliant on the earlier plans of Egyptologists but with additional aerial photographs that Grinsell had obtained through his involvement with the RAF. The book was largely ignored by Britain's Egyptological establishment.

=== Life as a professional archaeologist: 1945–1995 ===
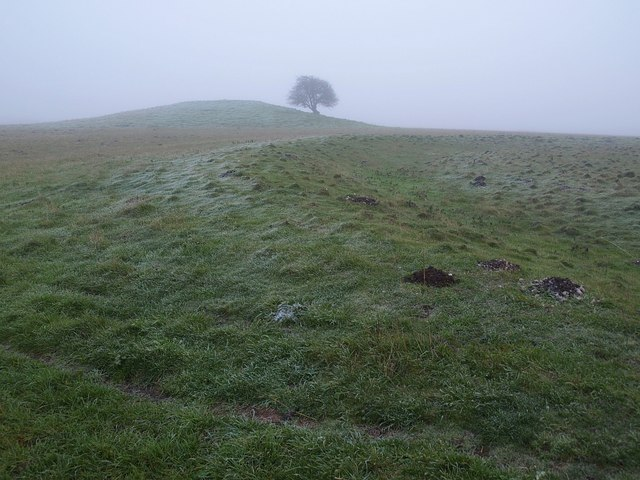
In the 1950s, Grinsell focused on the barrows of Wiltshire, such as Bush Barrow (pictured)

On returning to Britain, Grinsell went back to his job at Barclays Bank. In 1947 he was a Postgraduate Diploma of Prehistoric Archaeology student at the Institute of Archaeology (now part of UCL) at the University of London, in the same cohort as Sinclair Hood and Leslie R. H. Willis; senior by a year were Nancy Sandars, Grace Simpson, and Edward Pyddoke. That year he also became the treasurer of the Prehistoric Society, a position that he retained until 1970, during which he helped to secure the organisation's post-war reconstruction. In 1949 the archaeologist Christopher Hawkes invited Grinsell to join him and Stuart Piggott as a project assistant at Victoria County History in order to compile the Victoria County History of Wiltshire. Grinsell accepted, leaving his bank job and moving to the Wiltshire town of Devizes, thus becoming a professional archaeologist. Thomas later stated that the Victoria County History of Wiltshire "represents the high point in [Grinsell's] combined powers of fieldwork, grasp of secondary sources and handling of a great deal of detailed information." Grinsell later published the book The Archaeology of Wessex, which was based on his experience during this period.

Leaving Devizes, in 1952 Grinsell became Keeper of Anthropology and Archaeology at Bristol City Museum, remaining there until his retirement in 1972. He also published a number of academic articles and book reviews. During his holidays he often visited the Mediterranean, where he examined various prehistoric tombs. He also continued pursuing his interest in barrows, and by the 1970s had also catalogued those examples in Dorset, Gloucestershire, Somerset, and Devon.

Bristol University awarded him an honorary degree on the basis of his work, while he was appointed to the Order of the British Empire (OBE) in 1972. That same year a festschrift was issued in his honour, edited by Nichols Fowler. In 1989, Grinsell published an autobiography; reviewing it for the Folklore journal, the historian Hilda Ellis Davidson praised it but noted that it does not "tell us very much about the inner life of the author". According to the archaeologist Paul Ashbee, Grinsell's "directness, whimsical humour and sound common sense were legendary, as were his walking, youth-hostelling and penchant for traditional afternoon teas of the cream variety." A bachelor, he never married.

== Legacy ==
"Taking into account the large number of sites which have been visited on more than one occasion, [Grinsell] has probably carried out between 10,000 and 12,000 detailed barrow visits. The magnitude of this achievement becomes the more astounding when it is remembered that only for Wiltshire was he acting in a full-time professional capacity... The other work has been carried out at weekends and on holiday."

— Nicholas Thomas, 1972

Over the course of his career, Grinsell had examined and recorded around 10,000 barrows. Thomas stated that Grinsell's "astonishing volume of published fieldwork... assured for him a place without equal in the history of British archaeological studies". This recording was particularly valuable for archaeologists because it occurred before large numbers of British barrows were heavily damaged as a result of deep ploughing and land development. It also demonstrated the spread of barrows within particular regions and confirmed the older assumption that these barrows were heavily concentrated on areas of chalk geology. Many of the barrows that Grinsell discovered – such as Lambourn long barrow in Berkshire – were previously unrecorded, while he was also responsible for the discovery of rock art on the face of an Early Bronze Age grave slab at Pool Farm in West Harptree, Somerset.

According to Thomas, Grinsell's career illustrated the validity of amateur archaeologists, the importance of publishing one's research, and the significance of archaeological fieldwork other than excavation. The archaeologist Paul Ashbee expressed the view that "to a great extent [he] determined the direction of field archaeology in the second half" of the 20th century.

Interested in using sources other than archaeology, Grinsell made use of documents, place-names, folklore, and the accounts of antiquarians as part of his research. According to later archaeologists Amy Gazin-Schwartz and Cornelius Holtfdorf, Grinsell was one of the few archaeologists of his generation who was interested in the relationship between folklore and archaeology, comparing him in this way to continental European scholars Paul Saintyves, Horst Ohlhaver, and Karel C. Peeters.

== Bibliography ==
A bibliography of Grinsell's publications from 1929 through to 1971, including his books and articles, was assembled by Nicholas Thomas and Peter Fowler and published in Fowler's edited festschrift for him.

Year of publication	Title	Co-author	Publisher
1936	Ancient Burial-Mounds of England	-	Methuen
1939	The Blowing Stone	-	St. Catherine's Press
1939	White Horse Hill and Surrounding Country	-	St. Catherine's Press
1950	Studies in the History of Swindon	H. B. Wells, H. S. Tallamy, and Sir John Betjeman	Swindon Borough Council
1953	Ancient Burial-Mounds of England (second edition)	-	Methuen
1956	Stanton Drew Stone Circles, Somerset	-	HMSO
1957	A History of the County of Wiltshire Volume 1	-	Oxford University Press
1958	The Archaeology of Wessex	-	Methuen
1959	Dorset Barrows	-	Dorset Natural History and Archaeological Society
1961	The Breaking of Objects as a Funerary Rite	-	Folklore
1963	Stoney Littleton Long Barrow, Somerset	-	HMSO
1966	Belas Knap Long Barrow, Gloucestershire	-	HMSO
1966	Prehistoric Sites in the Mendip, South Cotswold and Bristol Region	-	Bristol Archaeology Rescue Group
1968	Guide Catalogue to the South Western British Prehistoric Collections	-	Bristol City Museum
1969	Prehistoric Bristol	-	Bristol Branch Historical Association
1969	The Cheddar Caves Museum: A Brief Guide, Summary Catalogue and Bibliography	-	Cheddar Caves Museum
1970	The Archaeology of Exmoor: Bideford Bay to Bridgwater	-	David & Charles
1970	South Western England	-	Shire Publications
1970	The Mendip Hills in Prehistoric and Roman Times	John Campbell, David Elkington, Peter Fowler	Bristol Archaeological Rescue Group
1972	The Bristol Mint: An Historical Outline		Bristol Historical Association
1975	Barrow, Pyramid and Tomb: Ancient Burial Customs in Egypt, the Mediterranean and the British Isles	-	Thames and Hudson
1976	Folklore of Prehistoric Sites in Britain	-	David & Charles
1978	Dartmoor Barrows		Devon Archaeological Society (Proceedings No 36)
1989	An Archaeological Autobiography	-	Sutton
1990	Barrows in England and Wales	-	Shire Publications
