= Stratigraphy (archaeology) =

Study of archaeological sedimentation for dating purposes

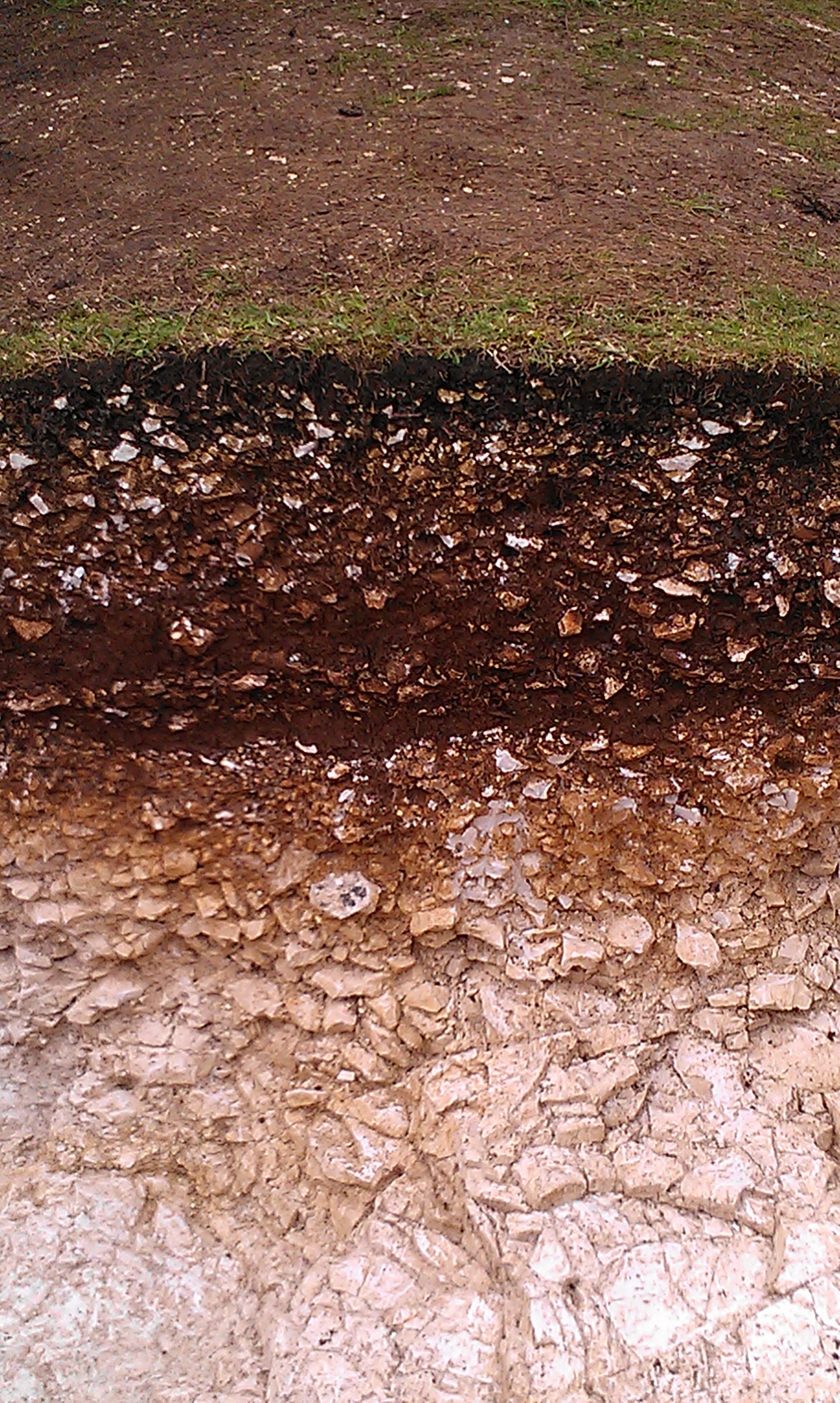
Archaeological stratigraphy at the Iron Age site of Goosehill Camp on Bow Hill, West Sussex in Southern England.

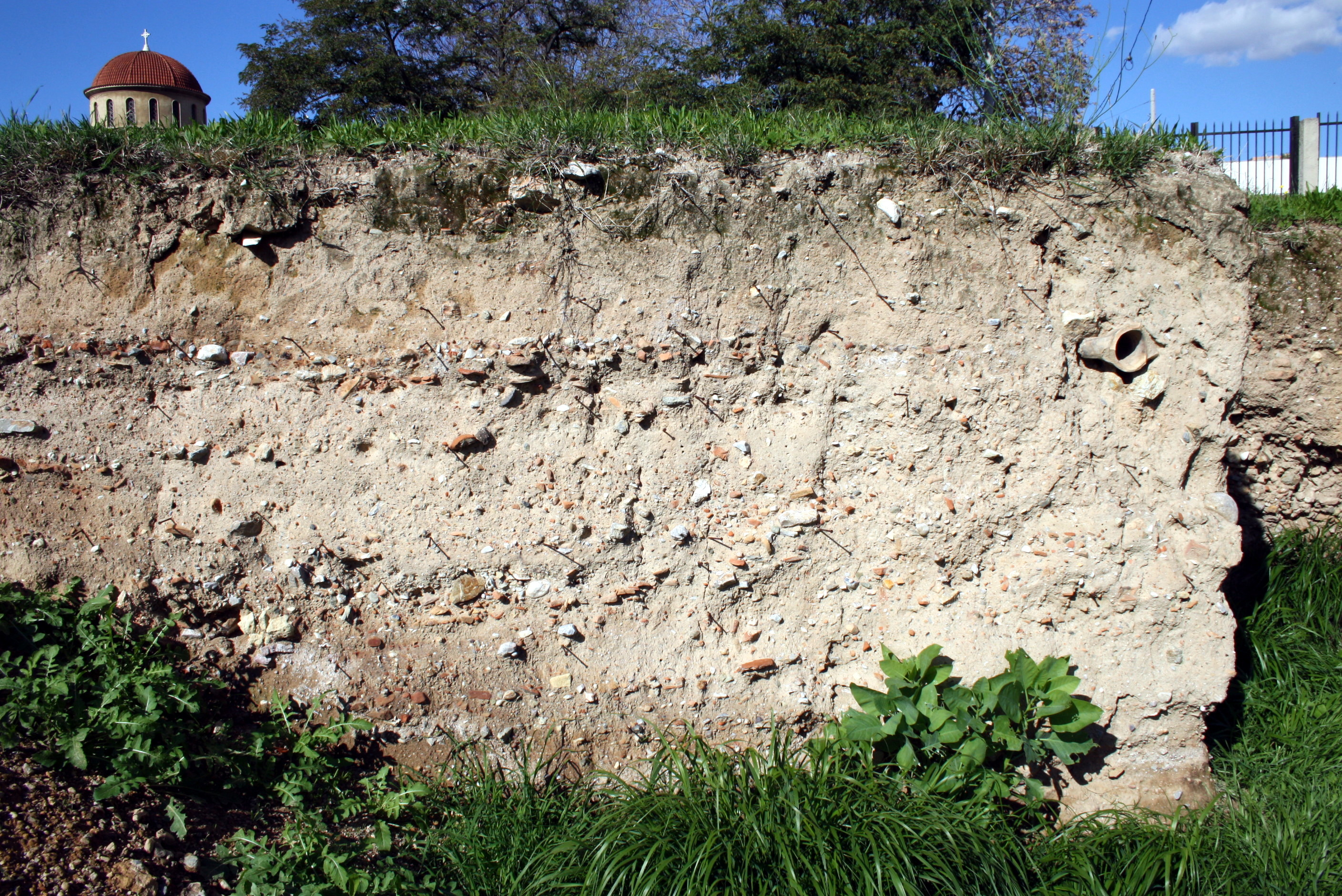
Neat stratification in Athens (Ceramicus Cemetery).

Stratigraphy is a key concept to modern archaeological theory and practice. Modern excavation techniques are based on stratigraphic principles. The concept derives from the geological use of the idea that sedimentation takes place according to uniform principles. When archaeological finds are below the surface of the ground (as is most commonly the case), the identification of the context of each find is vital in enabling the archaeologist to draw conclusions about the site and about the nature and date of its occupation. It is the archaeologist's role to attempt to discover what contexts exist and how they came to be created. Archaeological stratification or sequence is the dynamic superimposition of single units of stratigraphy, or contexts.

Contexts are single events or actions that leave discrete, detectable traces in the archaeological sequence or stratigraphy. They can be deposits (such as the back-fill of a ditch), structures (such as walls), or "zero thickness surfaces", better known as "cuts". Cuts represent actions that remove other solid contexts such as fills, deposits, and walls. An example would be a ditch "cut" through earlier deposits. Stratigraphic relationships are the relationships created between contexts in time, representing the chronological order in which they were created. One example would be a ditch and the back-fill of said ditch. The temporal relationship of "the fill" context to the ditch "cut" context is such that "the fill" occurred later in the sequence; you have to dig a ditch before you can back-fill it. A relationship that is later in the sequence is sometimes referred to as "higher" in the sequence, and a relationship that is earlier, "lower", though this does not refer necessarily to the physical location of the context. It is more useful to think of "higher" as it relates to the context's position in a Harris matrix, a two-dimensional representation of a site's formation in space and time.

== Principles or laws ==
Archaeological stratigraphy is based on a series of axiomatic principles or "laws". They are derived from the principles of stratigraphy in geology but have been adapted to reflect the different nature of archaeological deposits. E.C. Harris notes two principles that were widely recognised by archaeologists by the 1970s:

- The principle of superposition establishes that within a series of layers and interfacial features, as originally created, the upper units of stratification are younger and the lower are older, for each must have been deposited on, or created by the removal of, a pre-existing mass of archaeological stratification.
- The principle that layers can be no older than the age of the most recent artefact discovered within them. This is the basis for the relative dating of layers using artefact typologies. It is analogous to the geological principle of faunal succession, although Harris argued that it was not strictly applicable to archaeology.

He also proposed three additional principles:

- The principle of original horizontality states that any archaeological layer deposited in an unconsolidated form will tend towards a horizontal deposition. Strata which are found with tilted surfaces were so originally deposited, or lie in conformity with the contours of a pre-existing basin of deposition.
- The principle of lateral continuity states that any archaeological deposit, as originally laid down, will be bounded by the edge of the basin of deposition, or will thin down to a feather edge. Therefore, if any edge of the deposit is exposed in a vertical plane view, a part of its original extent must have been removed by excavation or erosion: its continuity must be sought, or its absence explained.
- The principle of stratigraphic succession states that any given unit of archaeological stratification exists within the stratigraphic sequence from its position between the undermost of all higher units and the uppermost of all lower units and with which it has a physical contact.

== Combining stratigraphic contexts for interpretation ==
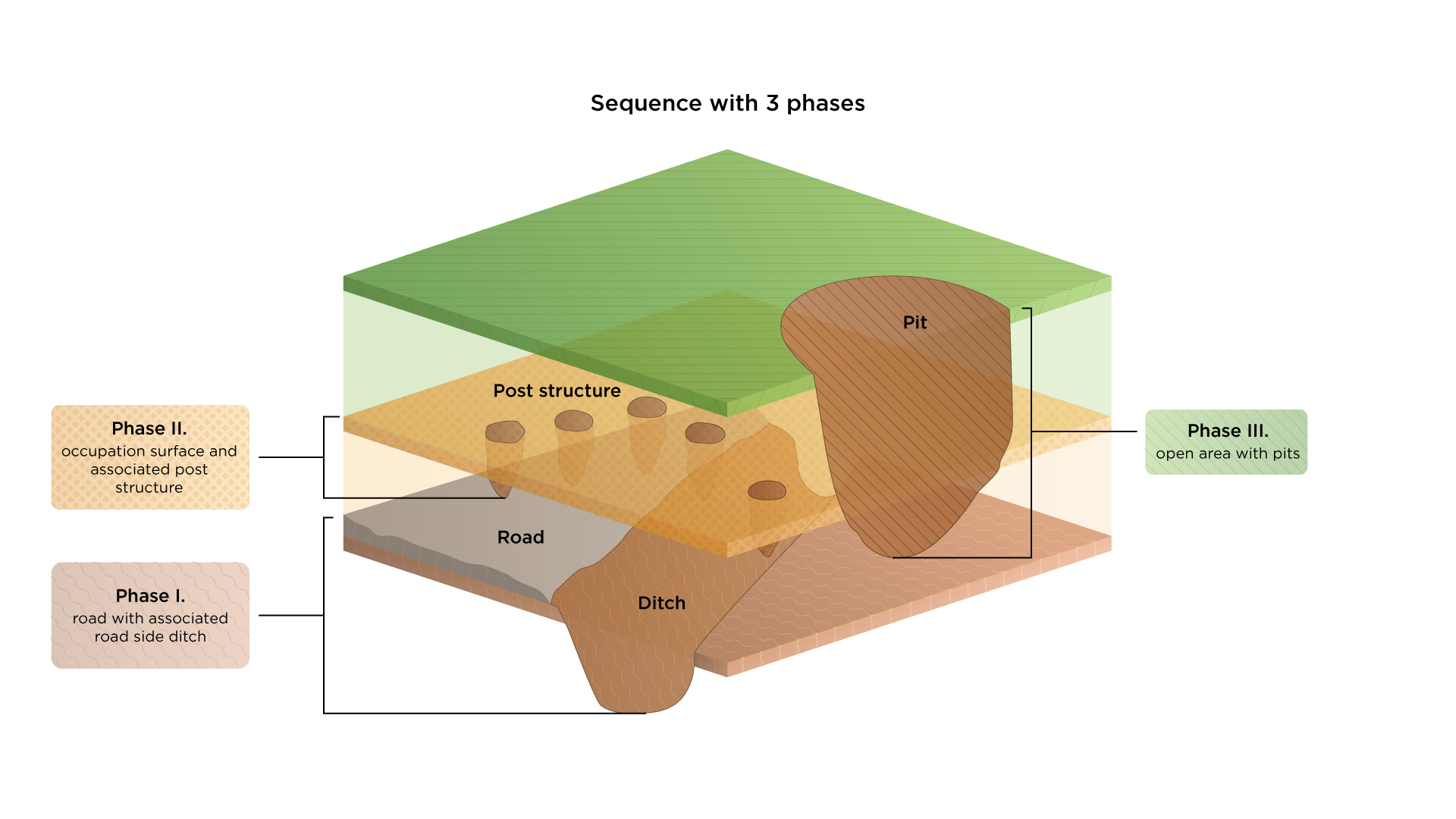
Illustration of the principles of archaeological stratigraphy

Understanding a site in modern archaeology is a process of grouping single contexts together in ever larger groups by virtue of their relationships. The terminology of these larger clusters varies depending on the practitioner, but the terms interface, sub-group, and group are common. An example of a sub-group could be the three contexts that make up a burial; the grave cut, the body, and the back-filled earth on top of the body. Sub-groups can then be clustered together with other sub-groups by virtue of their stratigraphic relationship to form groups, which in turn form "phases." A sub-group burial could cluster with other sub-group burials to form a cemetery, which in turn could be grouped with a building, such as a church, to produce a "phase". Phase implies a nearly contemporaneous archaeological horizon, representing "what you would see if you went back to time X". The production of phase interpretations is the first goal of stratigraphic interpretation and excavation.

== Stratigraphic dating ==
Archaeologists investigating a site may wish to date the activity rather than artifacts on site by dating the individual contexts which represents events. Some degree of dating objects by their position in the sequence can be made with known datable elements of the archaeological record or other assumed datable contexts deduced by a regressive form of relative dating which in turn can fix events represented by contexts to some range in time. For example, the date of formation of a context which is totally sealed between two datable layers will fall between the dates of the two layers sealing it. However the date of contexts often fall in a range of possibilities so using them to date others is not a straightforward process.

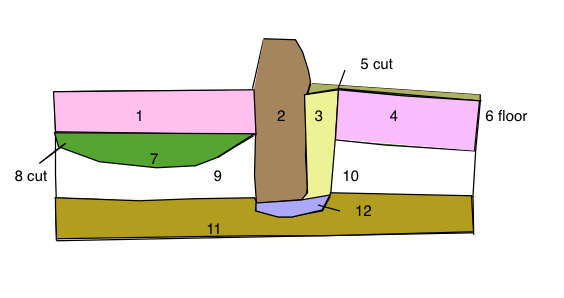
Figure A

Figure B

Take the hypothetical section figure A. Here we can see 12 contexts, each numbered with a unique context number and whose sequence is represented in the Harris matrix in figure B.

1. A horizontal layer
2. Masonry wall remnant
3. Backfill of the wall construction trench (sometimes called construction cut)
4. A horizontal layer, probably the same as 1
5. Construction cut for wall 2
6. A clay floor abutting wall 2
7. Fill of shallow cut 8
8. Shallow pit cut
9. A horizontal layer
10. A horizontal layer, probably the same as 9
11. Natural sterile ground formed before human occupation of the site
12. Trample in the base of cut 5 formed by workmen's boots constructing the structure wall 2 and floor 6 is associated with.

If we know the date of context 1 and context 9 we can deduce that context 7, the backfilling of pit 8, occurred sometime after the date for 9 but before the date for 1, and if we recover an assemblage of artifacts from context 7 that occur nowhere else in the sequence, we have isolated them with a reasonable degree of certainty to a discrete range of time. In this instance we can now use the date we have for finds in context 7 to date other sites and sequences. In practice a huge amount of cross referencing with other recorded sequences is required to produce dating series from stratigraphic relationships such as the work in seriation.

=== Residual and intrusive finds ===
One issue in using stratigraphic relationships is that the date of artifacts in a context does not represent the date of the context, but just the earliest date the context could be. If one looks at the sequence in figure A, one may find that the cut for the construction of wall 2, context 5, has cut through layers 9 and 10, and in doing so has introduced the possibility that artifacts from layers 9 and 10 may be redeposited higher up the sequence in the context representing the backfill of the construction cut, context 3. These artifacts are referred to as "residual" or "residual finds". It is crucial that dating a context is based on the latest dating evidence drawn from the context. We can also see that if the fill of cut 5 – the wall 2, backfill 3 and trample 12 — are not removed entirely during excavation because of "undercutting", non-residual artifacts from these later "higher" contexts 2, 3 and 12 could contaminate the excavation of earlier contexts such as 9 and 10 and give false dating information. These artifacts may be termed intrusive finds.

=== Archiving Stratigraphic Data ===
Stratigraphic data is a required component in archaeological archives, but there is a growing problem for digital data archives, where stratigraphic data are often only held on paper or as scanned image copies (PDFs) of matrix diagrams. This means that they cannot be easily re-used in further analysis. Some recommendations are being made to address this problem.

== Trivia ==
In contemporary archaeology, stratigraphical layers may even be formed by nesting birds, breeding on plastic litter. As plastic does not decompose, layers are formed year after year, documenting our throw-away society. These plastic stratigraphies can go multiple decades back in time. A nest from a Eurasian coot found in Amsterdam, the Netherlands, collected in 2021, could be traced back all the way to the early 1990s by checking the expiration dates of all the food packaging in the nest layers. The oldest nest layer included the packaging of a Mars bar advertising the 1994 FIFA World Cup.

== See also ==
- Archaeological culture – Group of artifact types and structure layouts that often occur together
- Christian Maclagan – British antiquary and archaeologist (1811–1901) – Scottish antiquarian and archaeologist
- Relative dating – Determination of the relative order of archaeological layers and artifacts
- Reverse stratigraphy or inverted stratigraphy
- Sequence (archaeology) – Stratigraphy of the archaeological record, used as part of the 'seriation' method of relative dating
- Sequence dating – Archaeological relative dating method based on linking pottery styles to time periods
