= Marast =

- Commune
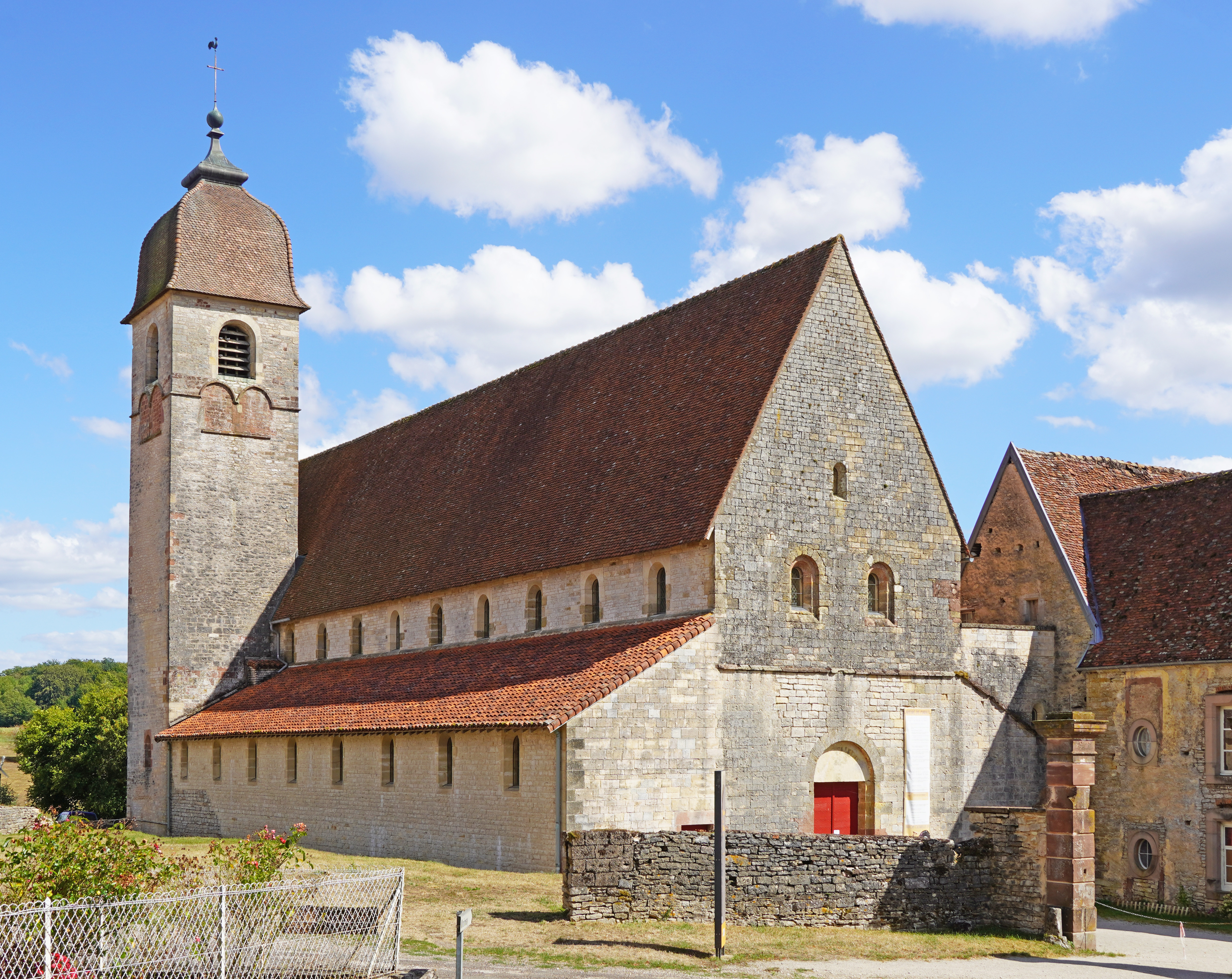
- The church in Marast

- Coat of arms
- Location of Marast
- Location within France Location within Bourgogne-Franche-Comté
- Coordinates: 47°33′29″N 6°22′59″E
- Country: France
- Region: Bourgogne-Franche-Comté
- Department: Haute-Saône
- Arrondissement: Lure
- Canton: Villersexel
- Area^{1}: 3.06 km^{2} (1.18 sq mi)
- Highest elevation: 346 m (1,135 ft)
- Lowest elevation: 264 m (866 ft)
- Population (2023): 44
  - Density: 14/km^{2} (37/sq mi)
- Time zone: UTC+01:00 (CET)
  - Summer (DST): UTC+02:00 (CEST)
- INSEE/Postal code: 70332 /70110
- ^{1} French Land Register data, which excludes lakes, ponds, glaciers > 1 km^{2} (0.386 sq mi or 247 acres) and river estuaries.

Marast is a commune in the Haute-Saône department in the region of Bourgogne-Franche-Comté in eastern France.

== Priory of Marast ==
In the quiet village of Marast, stands the historic Priory of Marast. One of its notable former owners was Humbert of Villersexel, Count of La Roche-en-Montagne, who, along with his wife Marguerite de Charny, is buried in Marast. This couple is historically significant as they were known to have possessed the Shroud of Turin.

The priory, rich in history, features 20 rooms, two spacious attics, and a 12th-century vaulted cellar, all situated on a 3,630 square meter property. While the priory currently serves as a holiday home, it requires renovation. As a designated “monument classé” (protected historical monument), investments made toward its restoration are fully deductible from French taxes, providing a unique opportunity for prospective owners to convert tax obligations into property improvements and potential capital gains.

Adjacent to the priory is a state-owned church that attracts visitors as a tourist site. Both the priory and the church are situated along the Route of Santiago de Compostela, a renowned pilgrimage route.

== See also ==
- Communes of the Haute-Saône department
