= Monument Class Description =

A Monument Class Description provides a synthesis and summary of the archaeological evidence for a particular type of British ancient monument. The Monument Class Descriptions were created by English Heritage as part of the Monuments Protection Programme.

Because archaeological remains are seldom good subjects for rigorous classification, these monument classes are regarded as provisional. However, they provide a good basis for beginning to understand the variability of the archaeological record in England.

== Prehistoric Monuments ==
=== Early Prehistoric Monuments ===
- Avenues (multi-period)
- Bank Barrows (multi-period)
- Bowl Barrows (multi-period)
- Causewayed Enclosures
- Concentric Stone Circles
- Cup and Ring Marked Stones (multi-period)
- Cursus
- D-Shaped Barrows
- Enclosed Cremation Cemeteries (multi-period)
- Entrance Graves (multi-period)
- Flint Mines
- Four Poster Stone Circles (multi-period)
- Henge Enclosures
- Henges
- Hengiform Monuments
- Inhumation Cemeteries (Prehistoric) (multi-period)
- Large Irregular Stone Circles (multi-period)
- Large Regular Stone Circles (multi-period)
- Long Barrows
- Long Mortuary Enclosures
- Long Mounds
- Monumental Mounds
- Oval Barrows
- Pit Circles
- Pond Barrows
- Round Barrow Cemeteries (multi-period)
- Simple Passage Graves
- Standing Stones (multi-period)
- Stone Alignments (multi-period)
- Stone Axe Factories (multi-period)
- Timber Circles
- Tor Cairns

=== Bronze Age ===
- Avenues (multi-period)
- Bank Barrows (multi-period)
- Bell Barrows
- Bowl Barrows (multi-period)
- Burnt Mounds
- Cairnfields
- Clothes Line Enclosures (multi-period)
- Coaxial Field Systems (multi-period) - see field systems
- Cross Dykes (multi-period)
- Cup and Ring Marked Stones (multi-period)
- Enclosed Cremation Cemeteries (multi-period)
- Entrance Graves (multi-period)
- Fancy Barrows
- Four Poster Stone Circles (multi-period)
- Hill Figures (multi-period)
- Hilltop Enclosures (multi-period)
- Inhumation Cemeteries (multi-period)
- Irregular Aggregate Field Systems (multi-period)
- Itford Hill Style Settlements
- Large Irregular Stone Circles (multi-period)
- Large Regular Stone Circles (multi-period)
- Linear Earthworks (multi-period)
- Martin Down Style Enclosures
- Multiple Enclosure Forts (multi-period)
- Rams Hill Style Enclosures
- Regular Aggregate Field Systems (multi-period)
- Ring Cairns
- Round Barrow Cemeteries (multi-period)
- Springfield Style Enclosures (multi-period)
- Standing Stones (multi-period)
- Stone Alignments (multi-period)
- Stone Circles---Small
- Stone Hut Circles
- Unenclosed Bronze Age Urnfields

=== Iron Age ===
- Banjo Enclosures
- Cliff Castles
- Clothes Line Enclosures (multi-period)
- Coaxial Field Systems (multi-period) - see field systems
- Cross Dykes (multi-period)
- Enclosed Oppida
- Gussage Style Settlements
- Hill Figures (multi-period)
- Hilltop Enclosures (multi-period)
- Inhumation Cemeteries (multi-period)
- Irregular Aggregate Field Systems (multi-period)
- Irregular Open Field Systems (multi-period)
- Large Multivallate Hillforts
- Large Univallate Hillforts
- Later Prehistoric Ports
- Linear Earthworks (multi-period)
- Multiple Ditch Systems
- Multiple Enclosure Forts (multi-period)
- Regular Aggregate Field Systems (multi-period)
- Romano-Celtic Temples (multi-period)
- Rounds (multi-period)
- Springfield Style Enclosures (multi-period)
- Standing Stones (multi-period)
- Slight Univallate Hillforts
- Small Multivallate Hillforts
- Square Barrows
- Unenclosed iron Age Urnfields
- Viereckschanzen (multi-period)
- Wooton Hill Style Enclosures

== Roman Monuments ==
- Aggregate Villages (Romano-British)
- Amphitheatres (Romano-British)
- Basilican Temples (Romano-British)
- Bridges (Romano-British)
- Canals (Romano-British)
- Cemeteries (Romano-British)
- Classical Temples
- Courtyard Houses
- Cross Dykes (multi-period)
- Curtain Frontier Works (Romano-British)
- Extraction Pits
- Farmsteads (Romano-British)
- Fort-Vici (Romano-British)
- Harbours (Romano-British)
- Ironworks
- Irregular Aggregate Field Systems (multi-period)
- Irregular Enclosed Field Systems (multi-period)
- Irregular Open Field Systems (multi-period)
- Major Villas
- Mausolea (Romano-British)
- Mines
- Pharoi
- Potteries
- Quarries (Romano-British)
- Regular Aggregate Field Systems
- Roads (Romano-British)
- Romano-Celtic Temples (multi-period)
- Roman Fishponds
- Roman Fortlets
- Roman Fortresses
- Roman Forts
- Rounds (multi-period)
- Romano-British Lime Kilns
- Romano-British Mansiones
- Romano-British Salterns
- Saxon Shore forts
- Signal Stations
- Vineyards (multi-period)
- Viereckschanzen (multi-period)
- Watermills (Romano-British)

== Early Medieval Monuments ==
- Animal Pounds
- Aristocratic Residences (Saxon)
- Barrow Fields
- Coaxial Field Systems (multi-period) - see field systems
- Colleges (multi-period)
- Cremation Cemeteries (Anglo-Saxon)
- Cross Dykes (multi-period)
- Double Houses (Pre-Conquest)
- Gate Bridge and Causeway Chapels (multi-period)
- Hermitages (multi-period)
- High Crosses
- Hlaews
- Inhumation Cemeteries (Anglo-Saxon)
- Irregular Enclosed Field Systems (multi-period)
- Irregular Open Field Systems (multi-period)
- Monastic Granges (multi-period)
- Moots (multi-period)
- Nuneries (multi-period)
- Palaces (Anglo-Saxon)
- Parish Churches (multi-period)
- Shrines (Post-Roman) (multi-period)
- Vineyards (multi-period)

== Medieval Monuments ==
- Almshouses (multi-period)
- Aqueducts (Medieval)
- Archery Butts (multi-period)
- Artillery Castles (multi-period)
- Bastles (multi-period)
- Beacons (multi-period)
- Blockhouses (multi-period)
- Brickworks (Medieval)
- Camerae
- Chain Towers (multi-period)
- Charterhouses
- Clapper Bridges (multi-period)
- Cockpits (multi-period)
- Coastal Fish Weirs (multi-period)
- Colleges (multi-period)
- Cottages (multi-period)
- Coureries
- Cross Dykes (multi-period)
- Decoy Ponds (multi-period)
- Deerparks (multi-period)
- Double Houses (Post-Conquest)
- Dovecotes (multi-period)
- Earthen Artillery Defences (multi-period)
- Enclosure Castles
- Field Barns (multi-period)
- Field Works (multi-period)
- Fishponds (multi-period)
- Friaries
- Frontier Works
- Glassworks
- Hermitages (multi-period)
- Hospitals (multi-period)
- Ironworks
- Irregular Enclosed Field Systems (multi-period)
- Limekilns
- Magnates Residences
- Moats
- Motte and Bailey Castles
- Motte Castles
- Monasteries- male (Post-Conquest)
- Monastic Granges (multi-period)
- Moots (multi-period)
- Multi-Span Bridges
- Nuneries (multi-period)
- Potteries (Medieval)
- Parish Churches (multi-period)
- Quadrangular Castles
- Regular Enclosed Field Systems (multi-period)
- Regular Open Field Systems
- Ringworks
- River Fisheries (multi-period)
- Roads
- Secular Cathedrals
- Shell Keeps
- Shielings
- Single Span Bridges
- Stockaded Enclosures
- Shrines (Post-Roman) (multi-period)
- Tower Keep Castles (multi-period)
- Trackways
- Vills
- Vineyards (multi-period)
- Warrens
- Water Meadows
- Watermills
- Woods (multi-period)

== Post Medieval Monuments ==
- Almshouses (multi-period)
- Animal Pounds
- Archery Butts (multi-period)
- Artillery Castles (multi-period)
- Bastles (multi-period)
- Beacons (multi-period)
- Blockhouses (multi-period)
- Cathedrals (Post-Reformation)
- Chain Towers (multi-period)
- Clapper Bridges (multi-period)
- Cockpits (multi-period)
- Coastal Fish Weirs (multi-period)
- Cottages (multi-period)
- Decoy Ponds (multi-period)
- Deerparks (multi-period)
- Dovecotes (multi-period)
- Earthen Artillery Defences (multi-period)
- Field Barns (multi-period)
- Field Works (multi-period)
- Fishponds (multi-period)
- Hospitals (multi-period)
- Ice Houses
- Irregular Enclosed Field Systems (multi-period)
- Martello Towers
- Mausolea
- Monastic Granges (multi-period)
- Non-Conformist Chapels
- Parish Churches (multi-period)
- Regular Enclosed Field Systems (multi-period)
- River Fisheries (multi-period)
- Tower Houses (multi-period)
- Tower Keep Castles (multi-period)
- Woods (multi-period)
