= Kingley Vale National Nature Reserve =

Nature reserve in the United Kingdom

Coordinates: 50.894°N 0.833°W

Kingley Vale
- Site of Special Scientific Interest
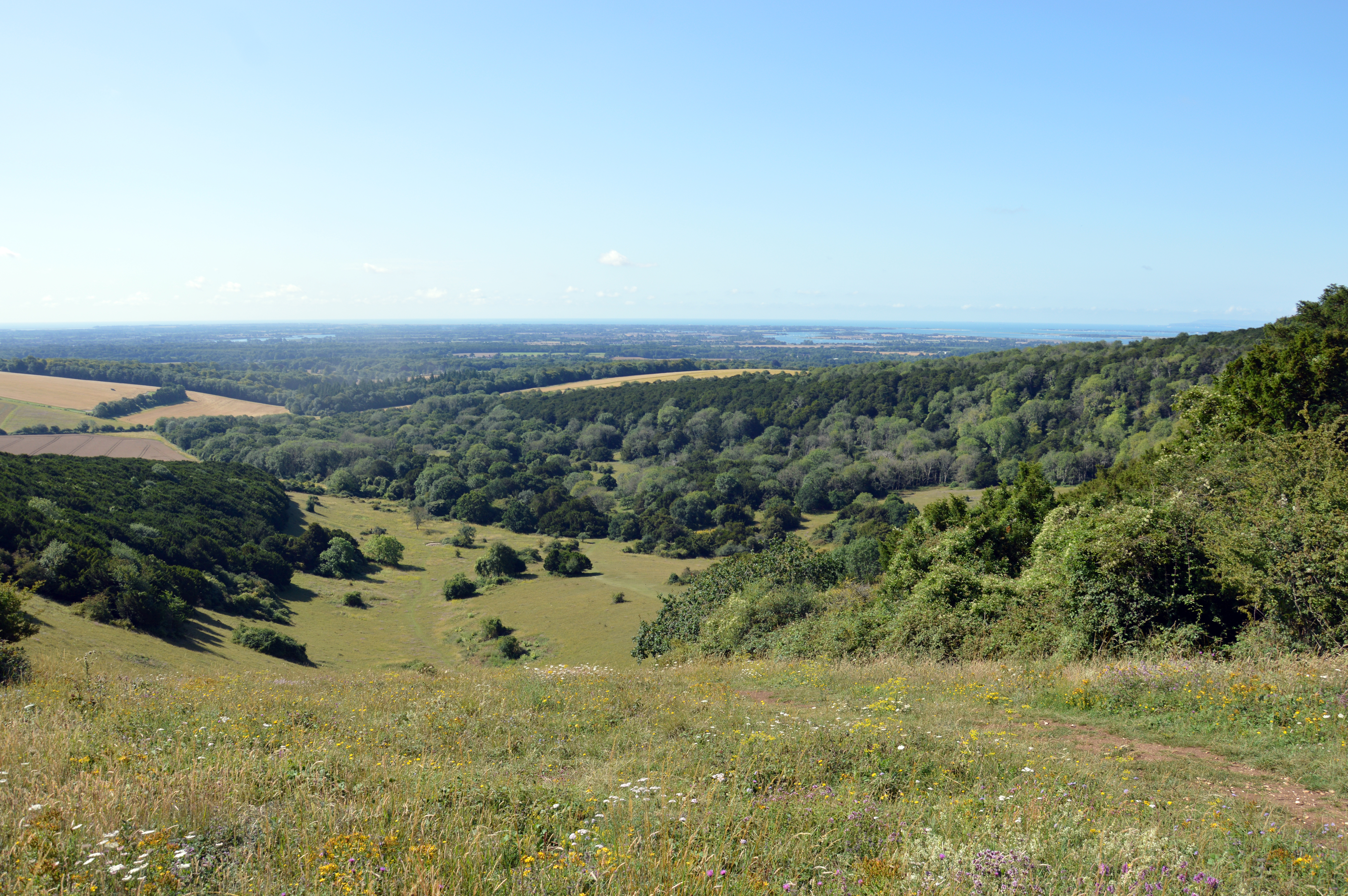
- Location of Kingley Vale.
- Area of search: West Sussex
- Grid reference: SU 822 112
- Interest: Biological
- Area: 204.4 hectares (505 acres)
- Notification date: 1986
- Location map: Magic Map

Kingley Vale is a 204.4-hectare (505-acre) biological Site of Special Scientific Interest north of Chichester in West Sussex. It is also a Special Area of Conservation and a Nature Conservation Review site, Grade I. An area of 147.9 hectares (365 acres) is a national nature reserve. Part of the land area designated as Kingley Vale SSSI is owned by the Forestry Commission

The site is managed by Natural England. It has an information centre and a nature trail. There is a large area of grass downland and shrubland with a number of old yew trees. From the top there are views over Sussex and the south coast. There are a number of walks and bridleways around the NNR.The main walk (known as the "Hidden Landscape Trail") focuses on the Devil's Humps, Goosehill Camp and Auxiliary units of World War II, as well as highlighting other hidden ancient features.

The reserve car park is at West Stoke about five miles northwest of Chichester, and there are footpaths leading up from the village of Stoughton.

== Natural features ==
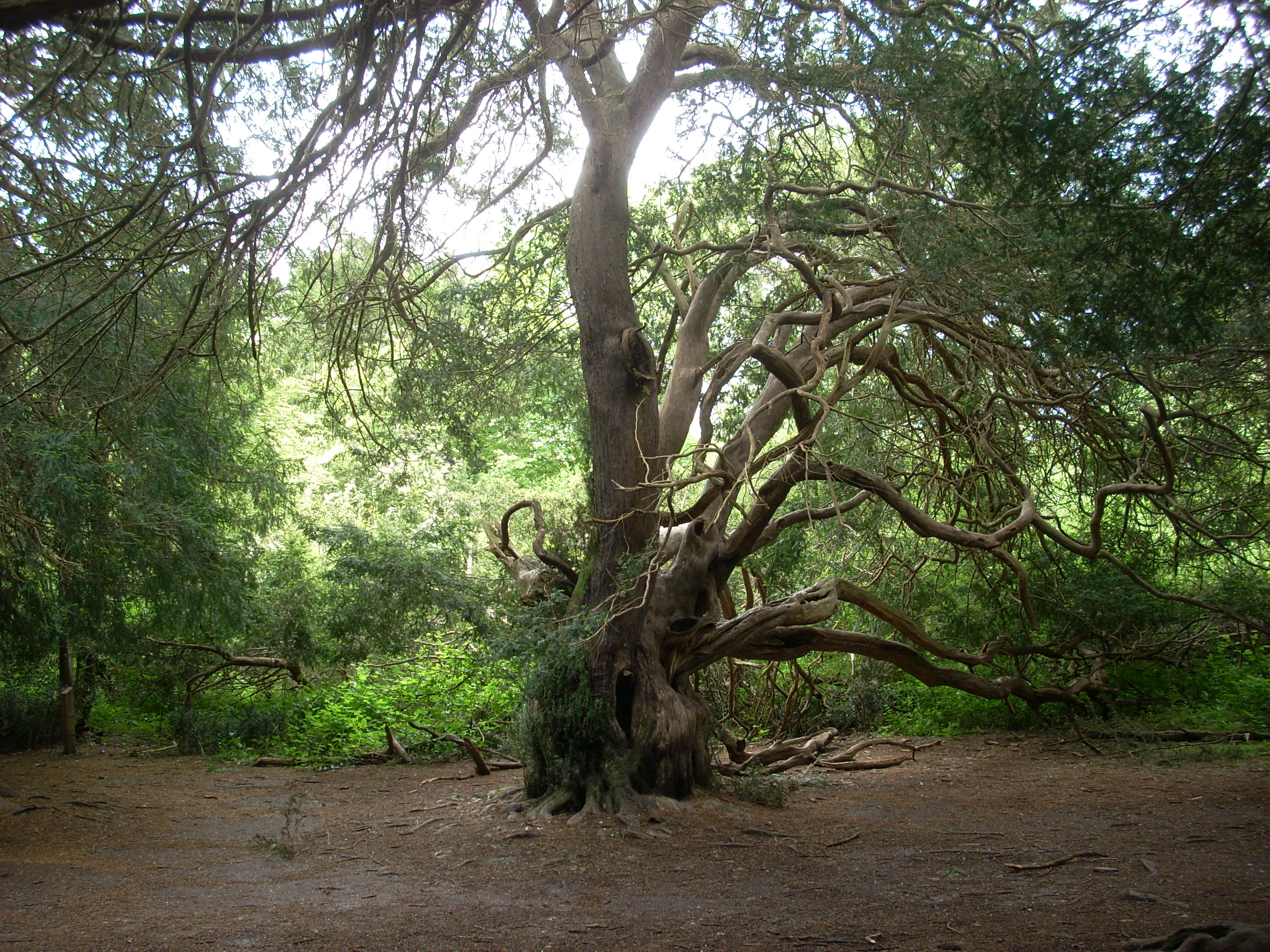
An ancient yew

Kingley Vale has one of Europe's most impressive yew forests. The forest contains yews as much as 2,000 years old, which are some of the oldest living organisms in Great Britain. Their survival is remarkable because most ancient yew trees across Europe were felled after the 14th century, being the preferred material for the staves of English longbows.

In 1472, with the increasing popularity of the longbow, the English government enacted a "yew tax" of four "bowestaffs" for every cask of wine unloaded at an English harbour. This sparked a rush for ancient yew trees across Europe, decimating the forests. Kingley Vale is one of the few major stands remaining; most yews elsewhere are solitary trees or small stands.

Other tree species in Kingley Vale include oak, ash, holly and hawthorn. Numerous ash trees were felled because of Ash dieback fungal infection that affected much of the South Downs in the 2010s. This has created new clearings in the woods for other plants to grow. The chalk grassland is home to many flowers and herbs that form a diverse mosaic of species. Over 50 species of birds are found, although only six species breed in the yew woodland. Mammals include deer, yellow-necked mouse, water shrew and dormouse. The 39 species of butterfly at Kingley Vale are mainly found in the grassland.

== Heritage sites ==
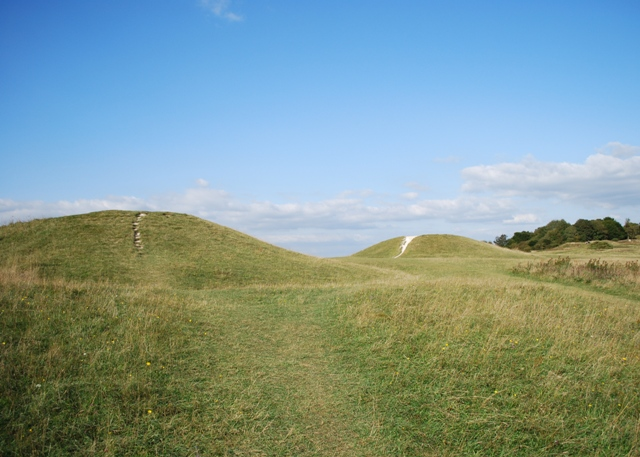
The Devil's Humps

Kingley Vale has a rich and diverse heritage with remains of a Romano-Celtic temple at Bow Hill, an Iron Age settlement site known as Goosehill Camp, the Devil's Humps Bronze Age round barrows, and prehistoric flint mines. There are also a number of unidentified archaeological remains in the form of linear earthworks, a rectangular enclosure known as Bow Hill Camp, and evidence of settlement at the base of the hill.
