= Devil's Humps, Stoughton =

Bronze Age barrows

Coordinates: 50°53′35″N 0°50′11″W

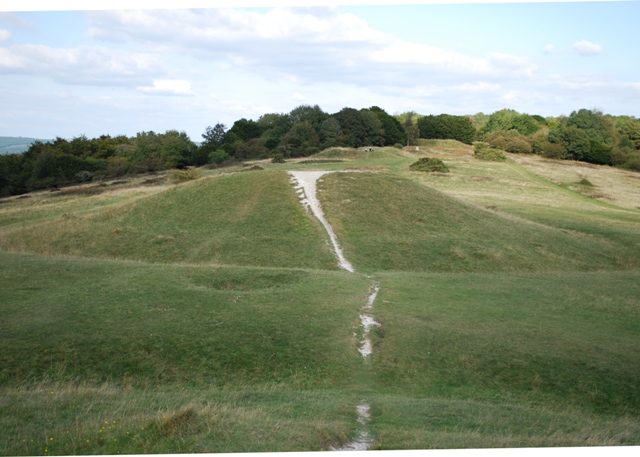
View across the Devil's Humps from the summit of Barrow A at the southwestern end. Barrows B, C and D are all visible, together with a possible pond barrow in front of Barrow B.

The Devil's Humps (also known as the Kings' Graves) are four Bronze Age barrows situated on Bow Hill on the South Downs near Stoughton, West Sussex. They are situated on a downland ridgeway crossed by an ancient trackway, above Kingley Vale. The Devil's Humps are counted among the most impressive round barrows surviving on the South Downs. The Devil's Humps are within the Kingley Vale National Nature Reserve. The two bell barrows together with two pond barrows and a cross dyke are listed as Scheduled Ancient Monument 1008371, while the two bowl barrows are listed as Scheduled Ancient Monument 1008372.

== The barrows ==
The four mounds form a small cemetery group running in a line southwest to northeast. The two southwestern mounds are located close together; they are bell barrows with a banked depression separating them. The two northeastern mounds are bowl barrows.

The four barrows forming the Devil's Humps are all aligned and stand 3 to 4 metres (9.8 to 13.1 ft) high in spite of damage caused by early explorations. No records survive from these early excavations, so the precise date for the construction of the barrows is unknown. However, they are believed to date from the Late Neolithic or the Early Bronze Age. It is possible that they were reused in the Roman and Anglo-Saxon periods.

The barrows are designated from A through to D, in order from the southwest to the northeast.

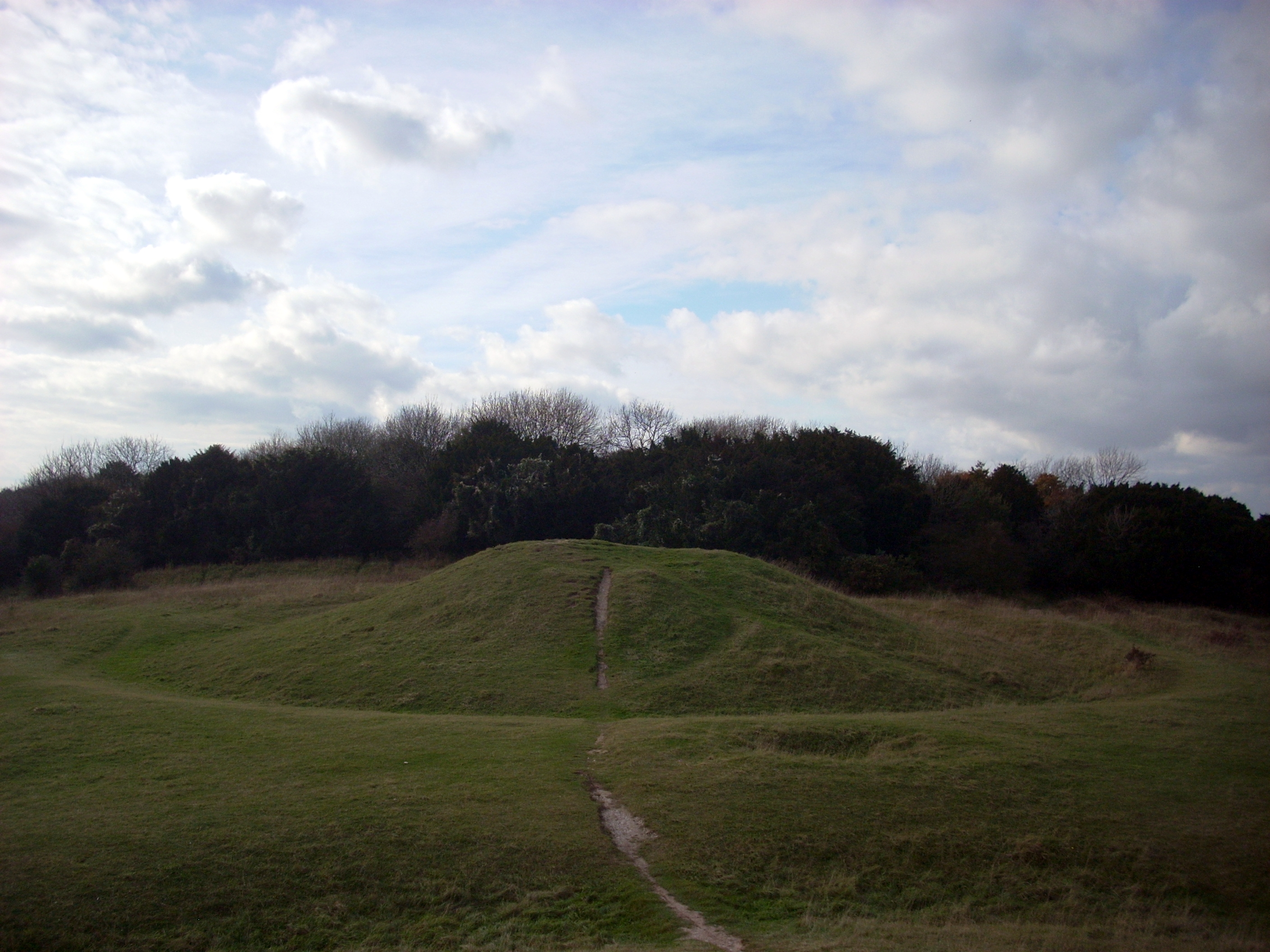
Barrow A from the northeast, with visible berm and ditch. The outline of a possible pond barrow is vaguely discernable in the foreground.

Barrow A is a bell barrow. It measures 22 metres (72 ft) across, and is bordered by a 3.7-metre (12 ft) wide berm enclosed by a 3.7-metre (12 ft) wide ditch. The ditch is 0.46 metres (1.5 ft) deep, and the barrow stands 3.7 metres (12 ft) high.

Barrow B is also a bell barrow. It is 24 metres (78 ft) across, and encircled by a 4.6-metre (15 ft) wide berm. The mound stands 3.7 metres (12 ft) high. A ditch runs around the berm; it is 3.7 metres (12 ft) wide and 0.46 metres (1.5 ft) deep.

Barrow C is a ditched bowl barrow standing 3.0 metres (10 ft) high. It measures 28 by 26 metres (92 by 85 ft) (NS/EW), with the ditch having been filled in on the northwest side by the construction of a boundary bank. The centre of the barrow has been excavated.

Barrow D is another ditched bowl barrow. It also stands 3.0 metres (10 ft) high and measures 24 metres (79 ft) across, with damage to the centre from previous excavation. It is partially covered by bramble and scrub.

Two further possible barrows have been identified, one between Barrows A and B, and one to the northeast of Barrow B. They are small depressions measuring approximately 8 metres (26 ft) across and 0.8 metres (31 in) deep. They resemble pond barrows, but are considered to be small in size.

== Excavations ==
The two bowl barrows, C and D, were inspected in 1853, and Barrow C was opened. Upon opening it was evident that it had been disturbed previously, although a number of artefacts were recovered. These included burnt bones situated on top of an area of burnt soil, a whetstone, the tooth of a horse, antlers and a few fragments of Iron Age pottery. The artefacts from Barrow C are now in the collection of the British Museum. Barrow B was excavated in 1933. Surface finds from Barrow B included a Bronze Age flint scraper and fragments of Bronze Age or Iron Age pottery. The finds are now held by Lewes Museum.

== Other archaeological remains ==
There are a number of other ancient remains around Bow Hill and in neighbouring Kingley Vale, including a number of cross dykes and other earthworks, settlement sites in the Vale itself, two Iron Age hill forts, one of which is Goosehill Camp, and several long barrows on Stoughton Down to the north.

== Folklore ==
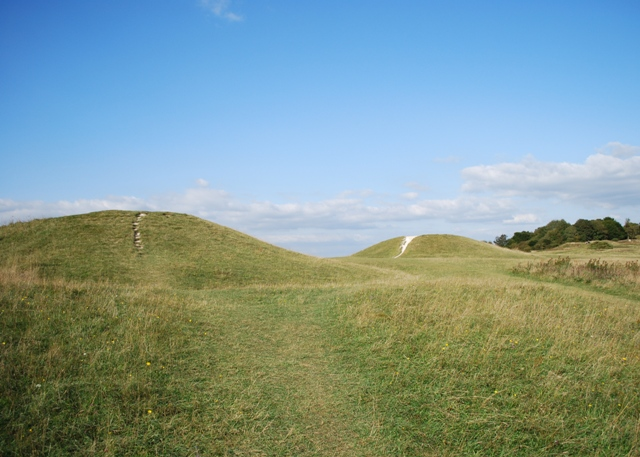
View of the Devil's Humps

The Devil's Humps are linked to a body of folklore encompassing Kingley Vale on the southern approach to Bow Hill. This folklore records how the men of Chichester defeated a Viking war party in the Vale, and the Viking leaders were buried in the Devil's Humps, giving them their alternative name of the Kings' Graves, while many of the Viking dead lie where they fell, under the yew trees on the slopes of the hill. Their ghosts are said to haunt the yew groves, and the trees themselves are said to come alive and move at night. This folklore may have had its origin in a battle between the men of Chichester and the marauding Danes that is recorded in the Anglo-Saxon Chronicle as having taken place in AD 894:

And then when the raiding-army which had besieged Exeter turned back homewards, they raided up in Sussex near Chichester, and the garrison put them to flight and killed many hundred of them, and took some of their ships.

— Michael Swanton (ed. and trans.), The Anglo-Saxon Chronicle (1996), p. 88.

== See also ==
- Devil's Jumps, Treyford
