= Itford Hill Style Settlements =

Type of English Bronze Age settlement

An Itford Hill Style Settlement is a form of later Bronze Age settlement found in Southern England and named after the site of Itford Hill in East Sussex. It is a Monument Class Description defined by English Heritage as part of their Monuments Protection Programme.

According to English Heritage's general description, these sites are formed of a number of enclosures which "generally take the form of a single low bank, which marks the perimeter of each enclosure". Associations have been made between Itford Hill style sites and burial monuments located nearby.

A number of examples occur on the South Downs of Sussex, the most notable being Itford Hill and Black Patch, both of which have been extensively excavated.

== See also ==
- Deverel-Rimbury culture
