= Bow Hill, West Sussex =

Hill in West Sussex

Bow Hill
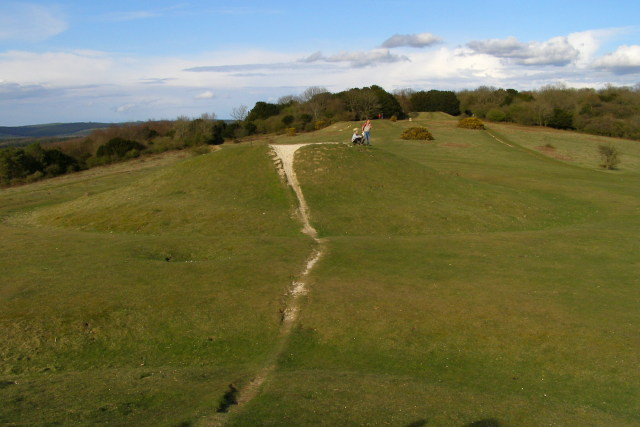
- The Devil's Humps barrows on Bow Hill.

Highest point
- Elevation: 206 m (676 ft)
- Prominence: 74 m (243 ft)
- Listing: Tump
- Coordinates: 50°53′40″N 0°49′45″W

Geography
- Location: South Downs
- Parent range: Butser Hill
- OS grid: SU 8244 1121
- Topo map: OS Landranger 197, Explorer OL8, 120

Bow Hill is an elongated hill ridge, 206 metres (676 ft) high, and running roughly from north to south in the South Downs, in the county of West Sussex, England. It has a prominence of 74 metres.

== Location ==
Bow Hill is the highest point of Stoughton Down which lies to the east of the village of Stoughton in West Sussex. The summit itself is 2 kilometres due east of Stoughton and about 7 kilometres northwest of the nearest large town, Chichester. To the south are Stoke Down and the village of West Stoke; to the east and southeast are the villages of West Dean and Mid Lavant in the valley of the River Lavant, to the north are East Marden and Chilgrove.

== Description ==
Bow Hill is the highest point on a north-to-south running and steep-sided ridge and there is a trig point at the top. Its crest and upper slopes are densely wooded, but the lower slopes are open downland. Various tracks and bridleways run pass close to the summit and there is a ridgeway that divides just northeast of the summit heading to Stoughton in one direction and West Stoke in the other.

== Points of interest ==
Much of Bow Hill lies with a nature reserve, although the summit itself is not. The ridge has much evidence of ancient settlement, including a cross dyke, tumuli, earthworks and long barrows. Of particular note are Goosehill Camp, an Iron Age hillfort about 1,500 metres north-northeast of Bow Hill on the east side of the ridge, and the Devil's Humps, a cluster of four Bronze Age barrows.
