= Devil's Jumps, Treyford =

Group of barrows in England

Coordinates: 50°56′57″N 0°49′37″W

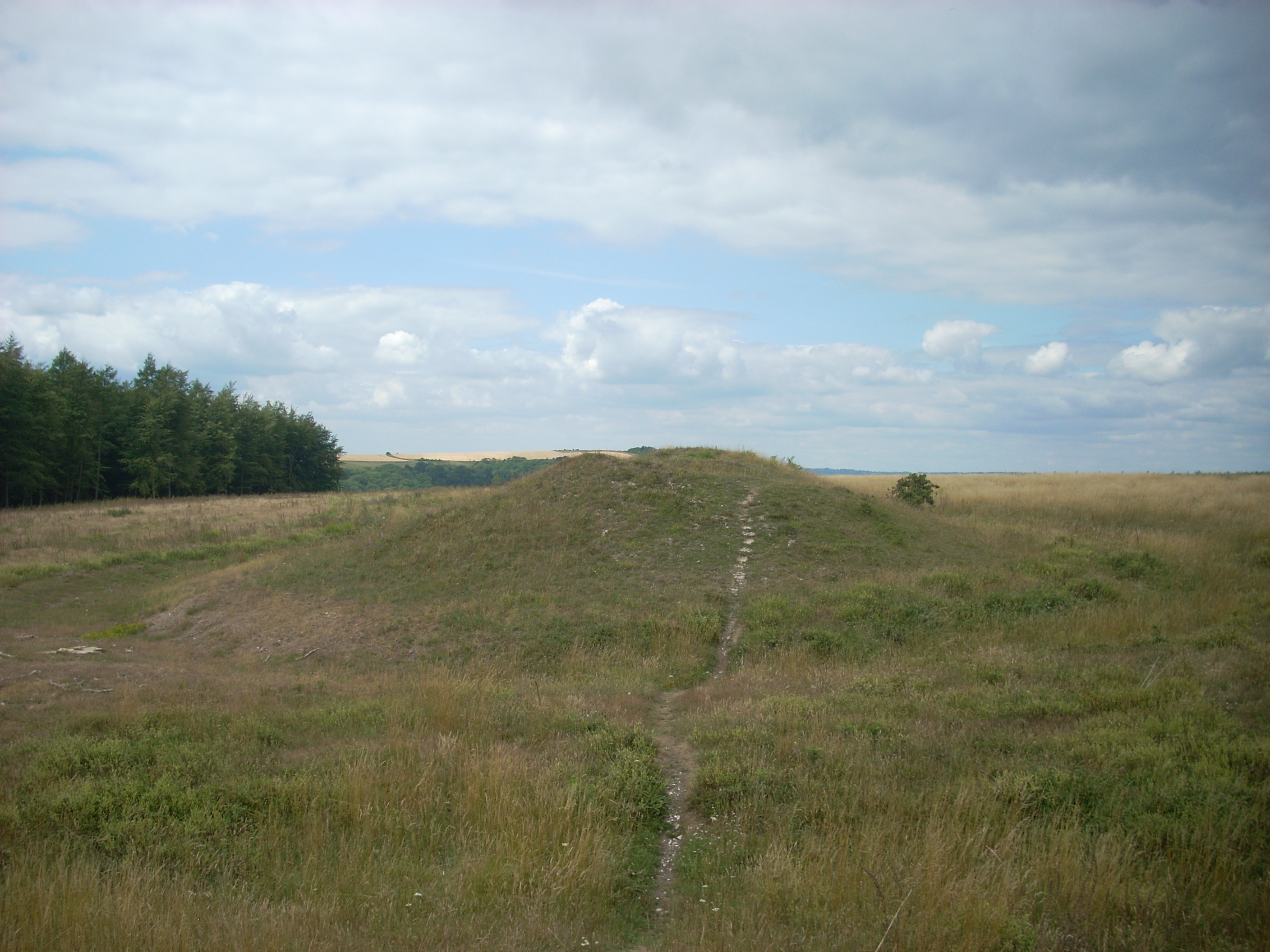
One of the bell barrows with a visible circular ditch

The Devil's Jumps are a group of five large bell barrows situated on the South Downs 1.2 kilometres (0.75 mi) south-east of Treyford in the county of West Sussex in southern England. The Devil's Jumps site is listed as a Scheduled Ancient Monument and as a Local Nature Reserve. Most barrows along the South Downs have been damaged by agriculture and treasure hunters but the Devil's Jumps are considered to be the best preserved Bronze Age barrow group in Sussex. The barrows are laid out in a line running approximately south-east to north-west. The five barrows vary in diameter from 26 to 34 metres (85 to 112 ft) and stand up to 4.8 metres (16 ft) high. Two smaller barrows were situated close to the five main mounds. Traces remain of a sixth barrow. The Devil's Jumps have been dated to the Bronze Age and they are believed to be between three and four thousand years old. The Devil's Jumps were explored in the 19th century, when bones were found in two of the mounds, although some of the barrows contained no cremated remains at all. The main line of five barrows is aligned with sunset on Midsummer Day.

The site is managed by the Murray Downland Trust and is cleared of overgrowth. The land is currently grazed by sheep and cattle as a part of this management. In 2009 permission was given by the landowners to clear trees from the site and return it to chalk downland.

== Folklore ==
The Devil's Jumps are the focus of local folklore, apparently transferred from the Devil's Jumps near Churt in the neighbouring county of Surrey. According to the story, the god Thor used to sit on Treyford Hill. One day the Devil saw the five barrows and started to jump from one to the next in order to amuse himself. This enraged Thor, who threw a stone at the Devil, causing him to flee.

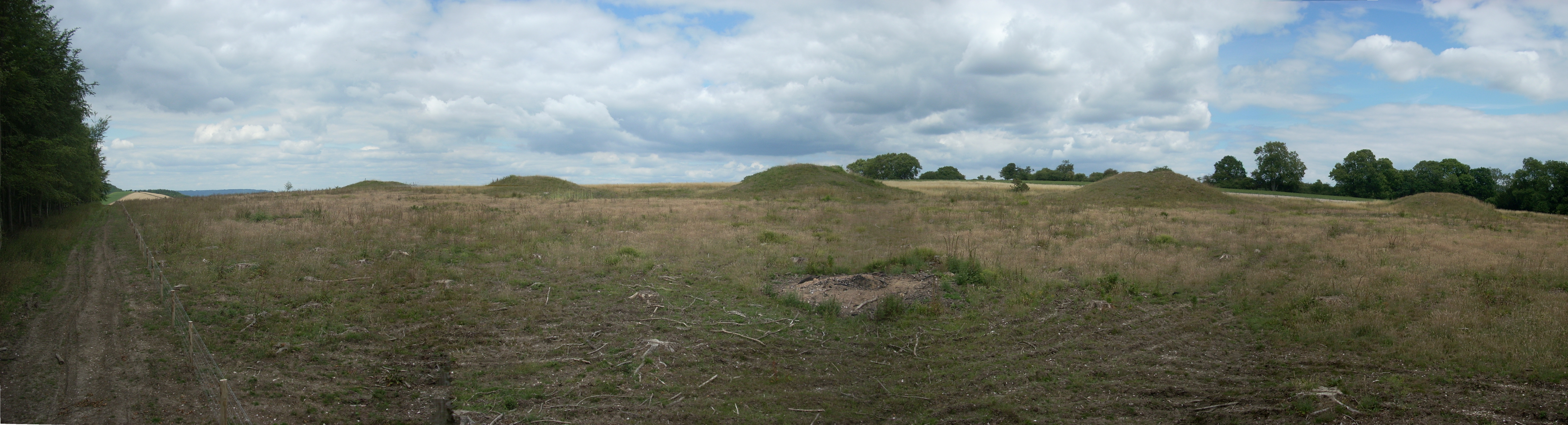
A panorama of the Devil's Jumps, viewed from the southwest and showing all five principal mounds.

== See also ==
- Devil's Humps, Stoughton
