= Funtington =

Village and parish in West Sussex, England

Coordinates: 50.86908°N 0.8634°W

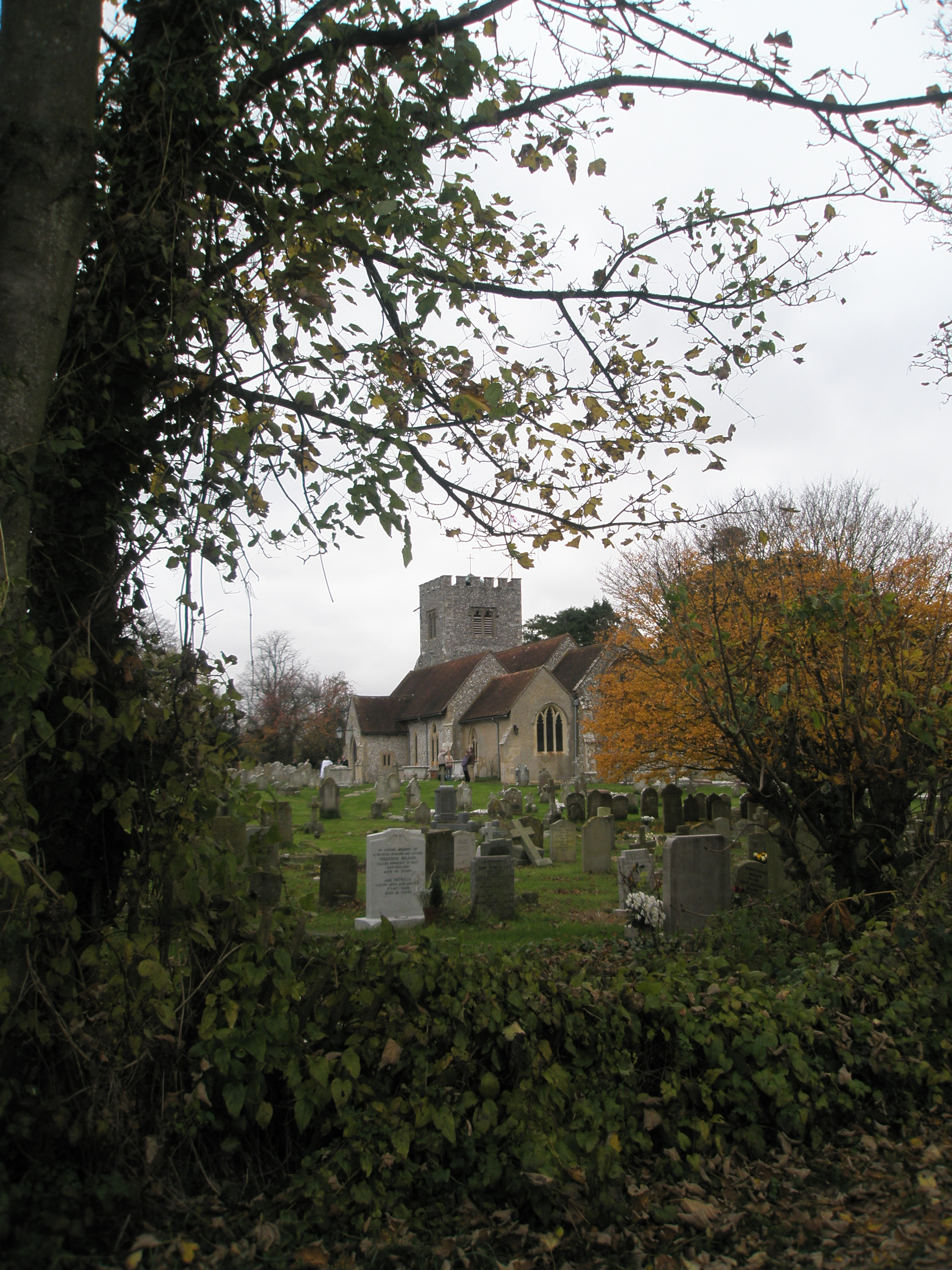
- Funtington Church

- Location within West Sussex
- Area: 20.02 km^{2} (7.73 sq mi)
- Population: 1,549. 2011 Census
  - Density: 72/km^{2} (190/sq mi)
- OS grid reference: SU800083
  - London: 54 miles (87 km) NE
- Civil parish: Funtington
- District: Chichester
- Shire county: West Sussex
- Region: South East
- Country: England
- Sovereign state: United Kingdom
- Post town: CHICHESTER
- Postcode district: PO18
- Dialling code: 01243
- Police: Sussex
- Fire: West Sussex
- Ambulance: South East Coast
- UK Parliament: Chichester
- Website: Parish Council

Funtington is a village and civil parish in the Chichester district of West Sussex, England. It lies on the B2146 Road 4.5 miles (7.2 km) west of Chichester. The parish also contains the villages of East and West Ashling, West Stoke and the Kingley Vale National Nature Reserve lies at its northern tip. There is a farm produce shop and a pub at the centre of the village. Funtington Primary School is in the village of West Ashling.

== Governance ==
An electoral ward in the same name exists. This ward stretches north to Compton with a total population taken at the 2011 census of 2,671.

== Religious sites ==
St Mary's Anglican church, dating from the 12th Century, is the principal church in the parish of Funtington. (Note: The church of St Mary's was founded in 13th century. There was a restoration in 1859, which Nairn and Pevsner were very critical of describing it as "senseless".) (Note: According to the St Mary's parish website, the church has become busier, particularly amongst the young with a local school holding special choir services. The building has been extended to provide a church room, funded by local benefactors and parish money-raising events.)

St Andrew's (Note: St Andrew's has a plastered flint exterior. The nave walls are 11th century.) church at West Stoke is of Saxon origin. The chapel of St Mary's at Sennicotts (Note: Sennicotts is a house and country estate in the Parish of Funtington.) lies about two miles (3 km) to the east, off the Chichester road.

=== The Old Congregational Chapel ===
The old Congregational Chapel, is a Grade II listed building, situated on the road between East Ashling and Funtington, opposite the turning to West Ashling. The foundation stone of the chapel was laid on 18 September 1863. Most of the building material used was stone recovered from the fallen tower of Chichester Cathedral; the tower having collapsed during a storm in 1861. The chapel closed, as place of worship, between 1934 and 1938. It became a scout headquarters for a while and then a clock museum run by the Clock Trust. (Note: The Clock Trust was dissolved in 2018)

== Landmarks ==
Kingley Vale lies on the border of the parish which is a Site of Special Scientific Interest and a national nature reserve. It is noted for its yew woodlands. The site is also known for its archaeological interest including Bronze Age and Roman earthworks, cross dykes, a camp and a field system.

Marshal of the Royal Air Force Charles Portal, 1st Viscount Portal of Hungerford (1893–1971), lived at West Ashling and is buried in Funtington churchyard.

Pat Porteous (1918-2000), a Victoria Cross recipient who took part in the raid on Dieppe in August 1942 is buried in St Mary's churchyard.

== Gallery ==
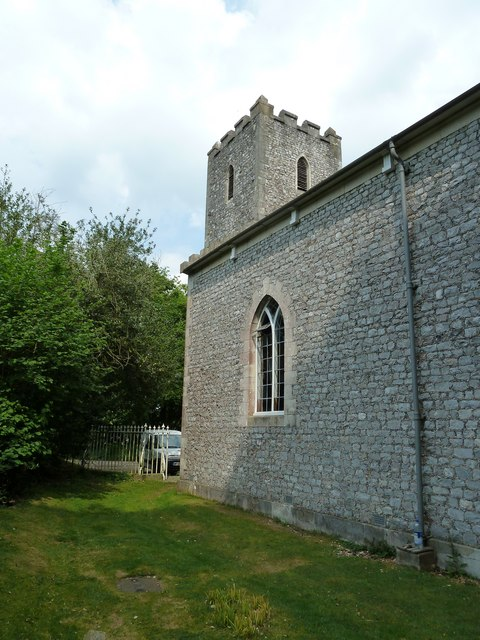
St Mary's, Sennicotts

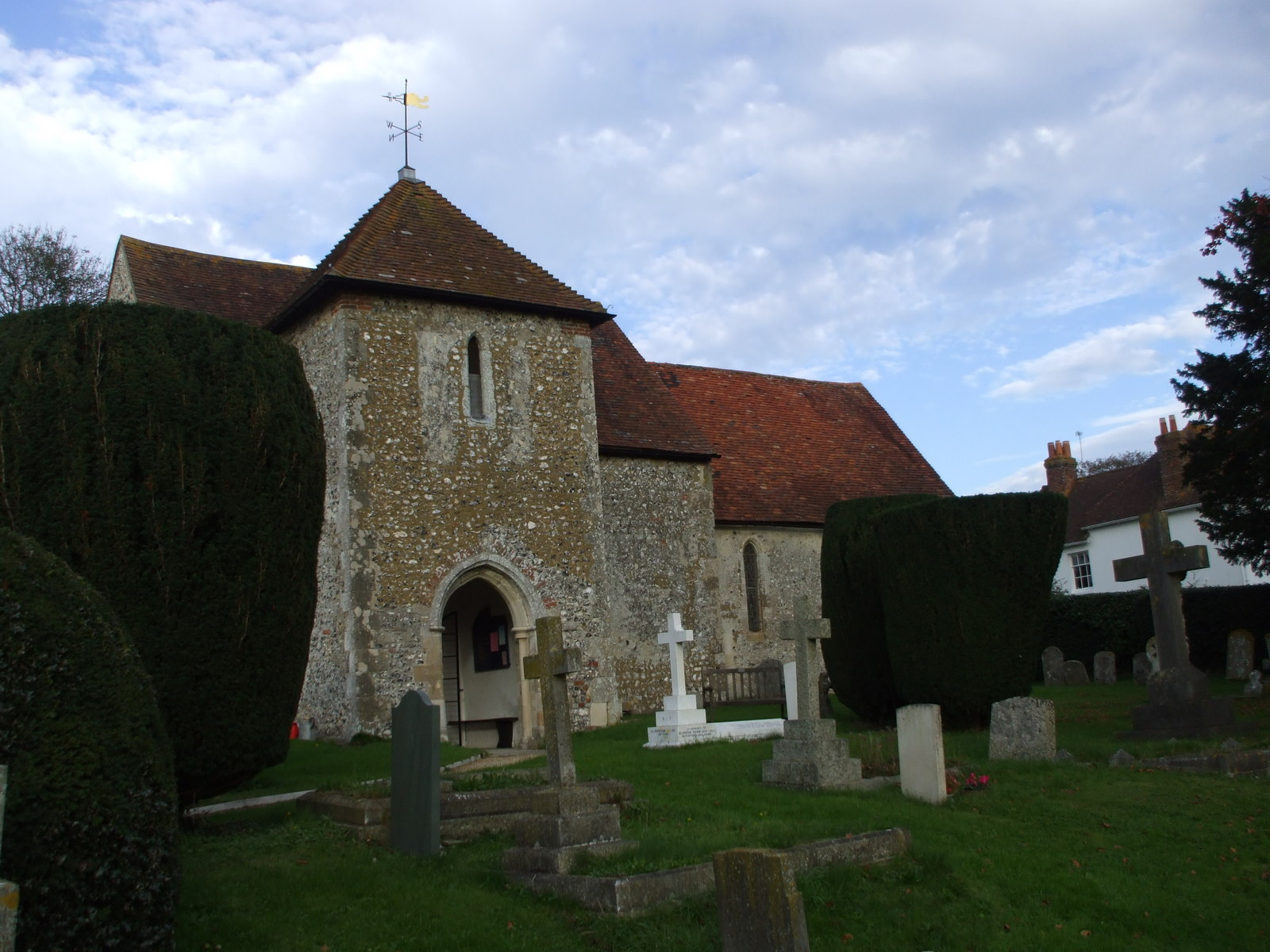
St Andrew's, West Stoke

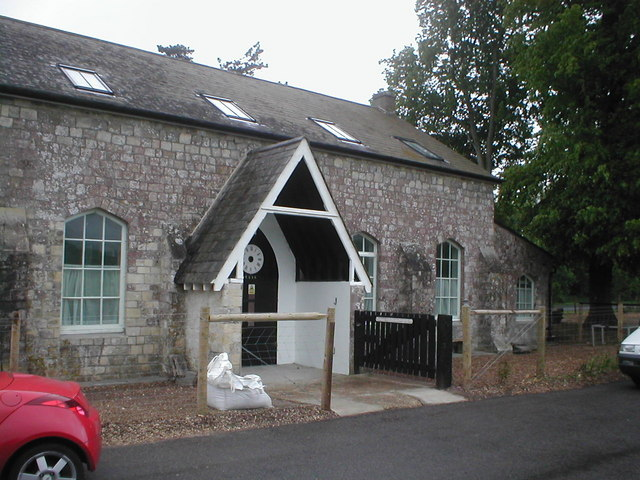
Old Congregational Chapel

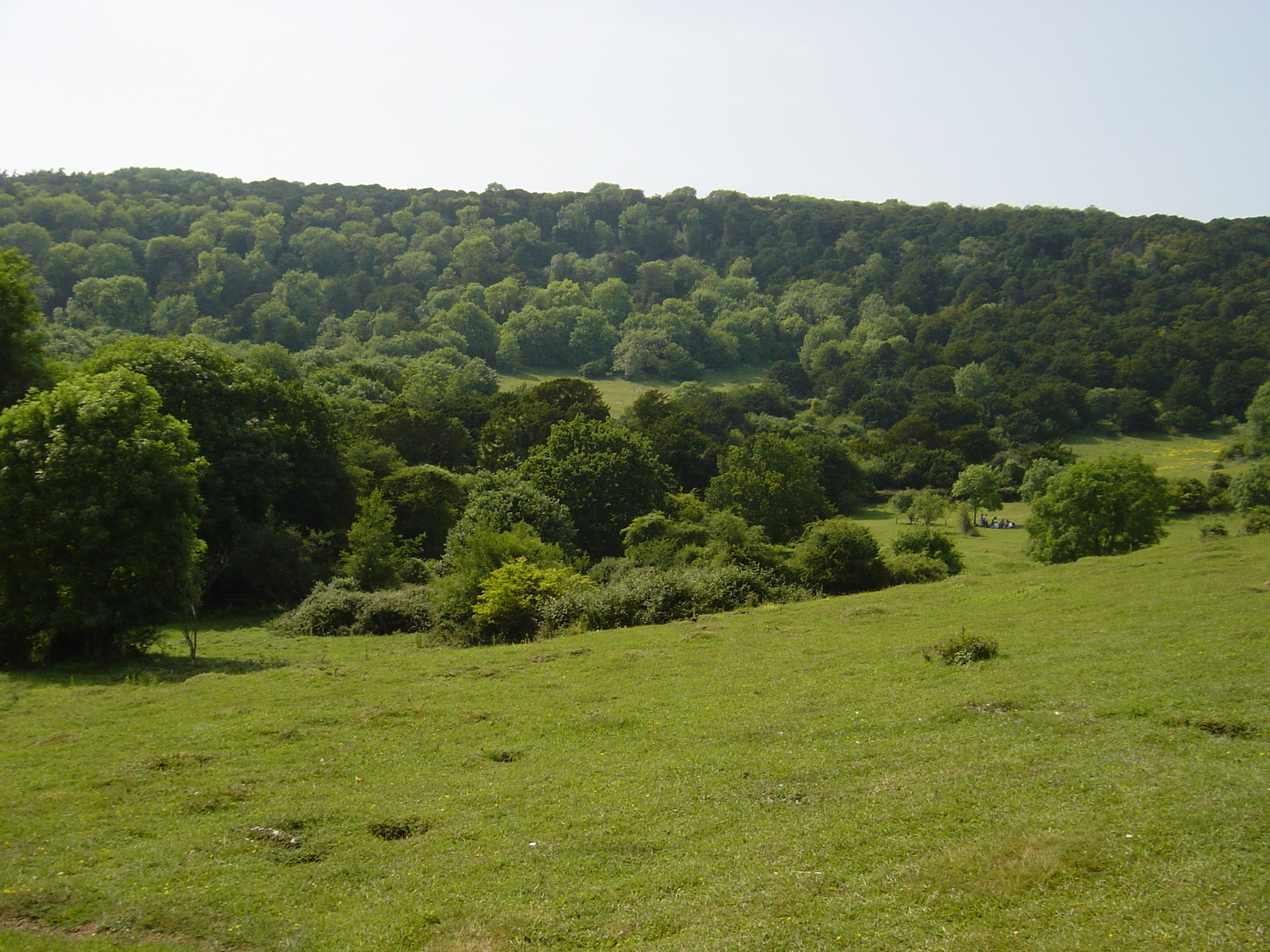
Kingley Vale National Nature Reserve
