= Stoughton, West Sussex =

Village and parish in West Sussex, England

Coordinates: 50.89697°N 0.8608°W

Stoughton
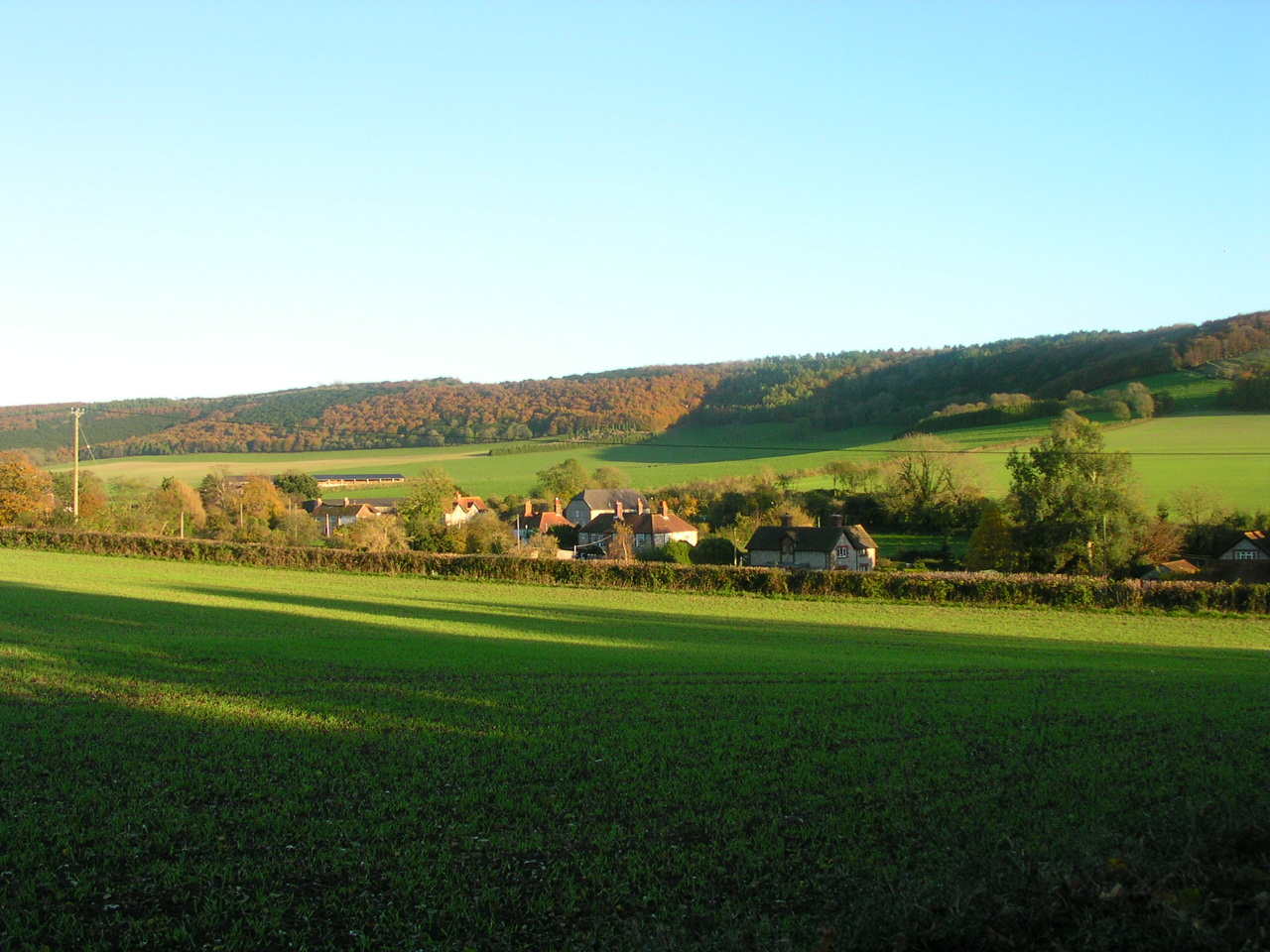
- Stoughton seen from the churchyard

- Location within West Sussex
- Area: 28.97 km^{2} (11.19 sq mi)
- Population: 659. 2011 Census
  - Density: 22/km^{2} (57/sq mi)
- OS grid reference: SU802114
  - London: 53 miles (85 km) NE
- Civil parish: Stoughton
- District: Chichester
- Shire county: West Sussex
- Region: South East
- Country: England
- Sovereign state: United Kingdom
- Post town: Chichester
- Postcode district: PO18 9
- Dialling code: 023
- Police: Sussex
- Fire: West Sussex
- Ambulance: South East Coast
- UK Parliament: Chichester

Stoughton is a village and civil parish in the District of Chichester in West Sussex, England located nine kilometres (5.6 miles) north west of Chichester east of the B2146 road, on a lane leading to East Marden. The parish has a land area of 2,987 hectares (7,380 acres). In the 2001 census 631 people lived in 255 households, of whom 286 were economically active. At the 2011 Census the population including Walderton had increased to 659. The parish is crossed from west to east by the Monarch's Way long-distance footpath, which passes through the villages of Stoughton and Walderton. There is one pub, The Hare and Hounds.

Famous 19th-century cricketer George Brown was born in the village.

== The parish church ==
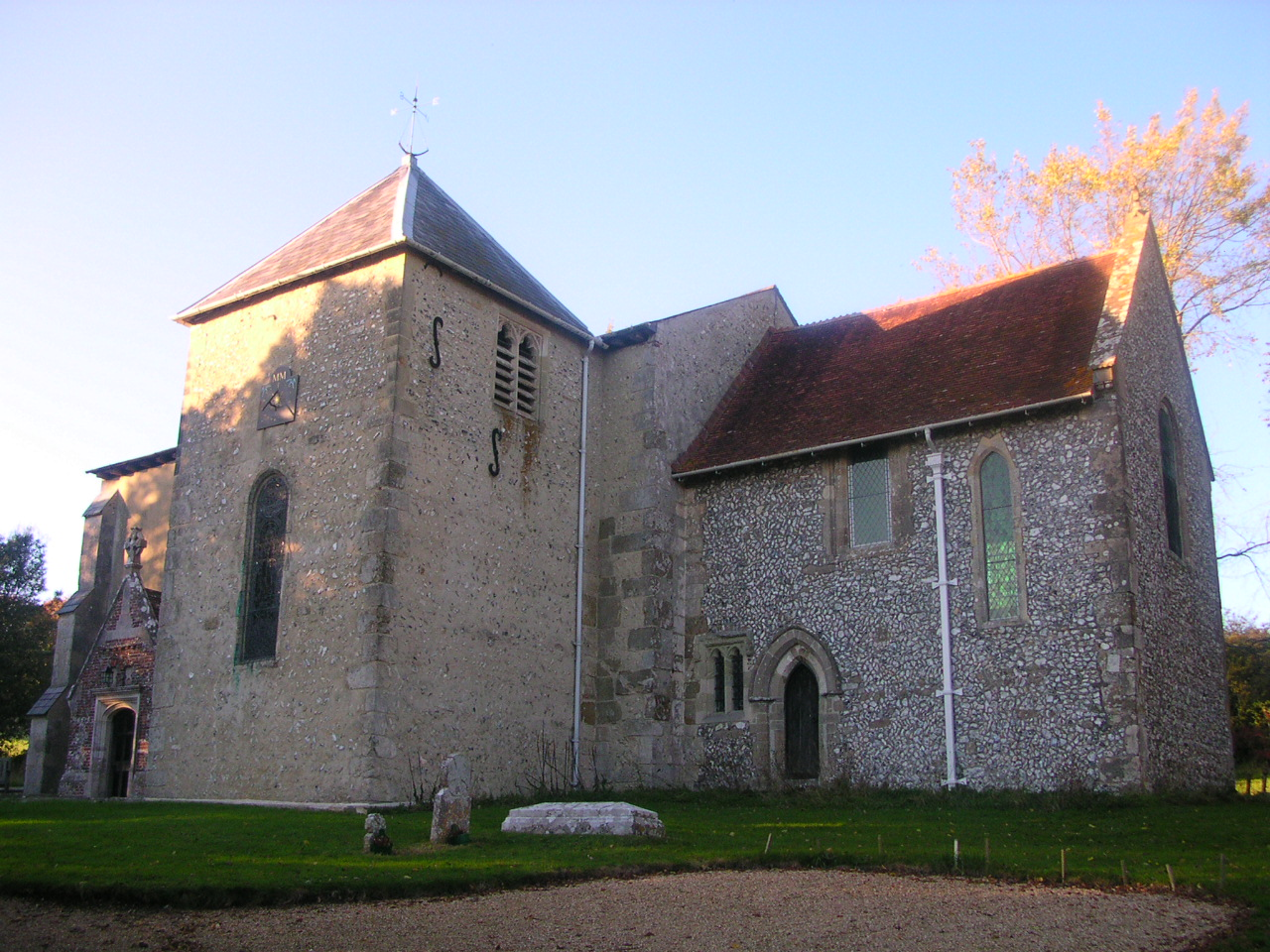
St. Mary's church

The church, standing on a hillside overlooking the village, is of late Saxon or early Norman origin. Built around 1050, the church was restored around 1850. The Trinity Episcopal Church of Stoughton, Massachusetts, USA received a stone from the ribbing in the old church's chancel area as a gift in 1935, presented to then Rector Marshall. It was placed in the floor of the pulpit. The restoration of some of its outer walls was at the behest of Elizabeth Killick, a naval engineer who was the first woman to become a fellow of the Royal Academy of Engineering. One interesting former incumbent was the Revd Philip Harwood Francis (1901-1987), who was vicar from 1957 to 1977 and is described on his memorial in the church as an “athlete, teacher, mathematician, author, eccentric and master of the short sermon”. His publications include a book on the Balbis.

== Landmarks ==
Kingley Vale, which lies on the border of the parish, is a Site of Special Scientific Interest and a national nature reserve. It is noted for its Yew woodlands. The site is also known for its archaeological interest including the Bronze Age barrow cemetery known as the Devil's Humps, Bronze Age and Roman earthworks, cross dykes, a camp and a field system.

== War memorial ==
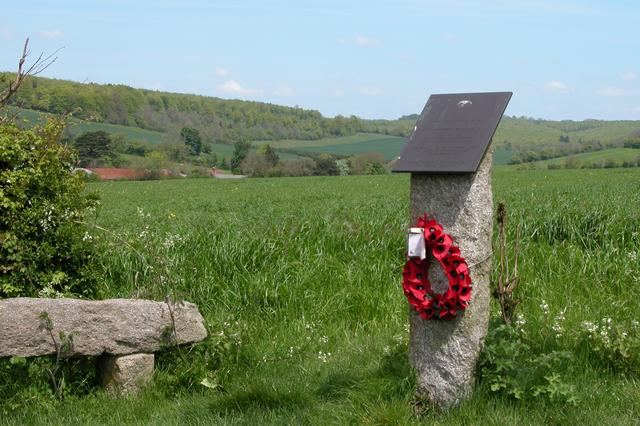
Memorial to Bolesiaw Wiasnowolski V.M., K.W.

In addition to the list of names in the church, there is a memorial to Pilot Officer Bolesław Własnowolski V.M., K.W., by the side of the path to Kingley Vale, next to the field where his Hurricane crashed in November 1940.
