= Goosehill Camp =

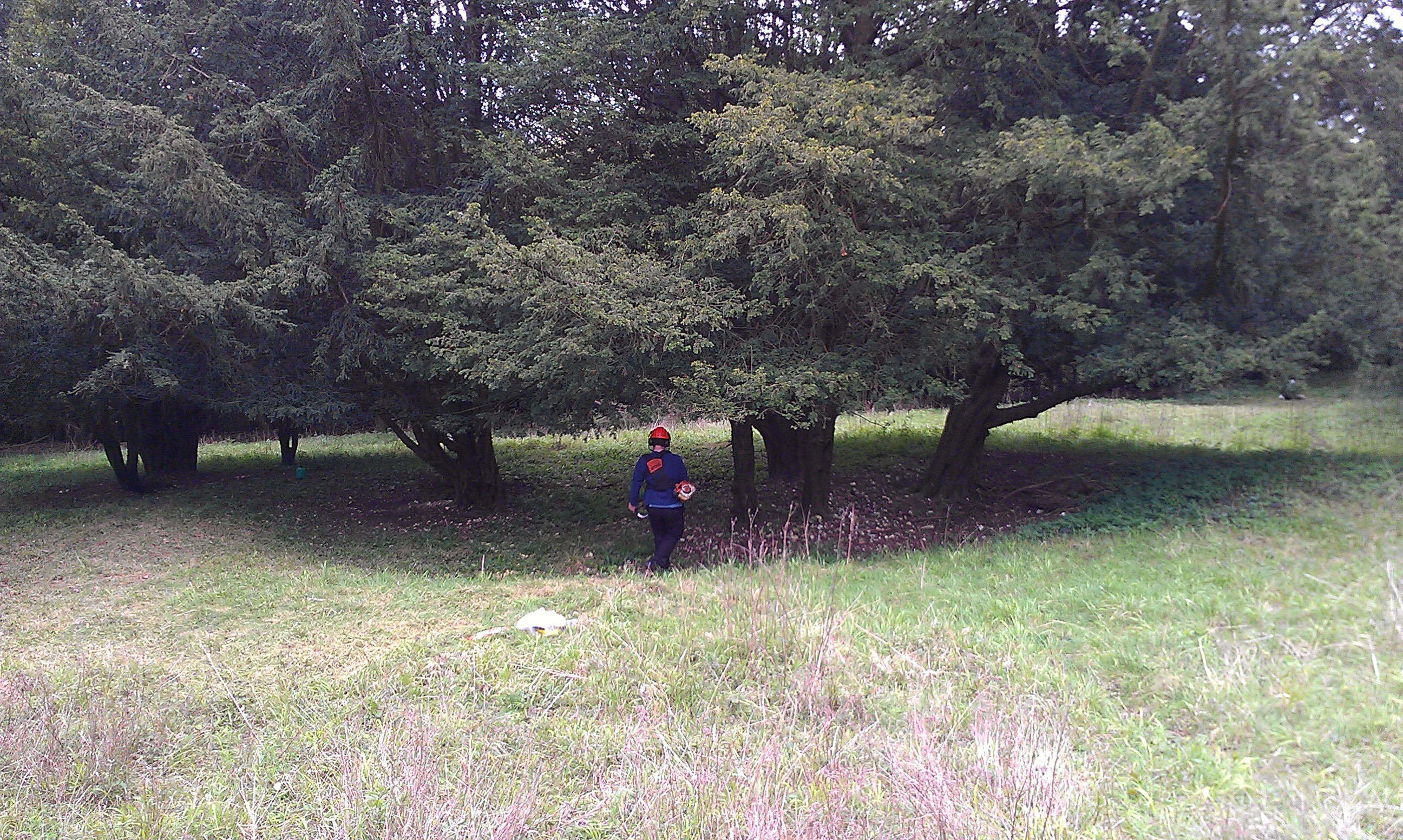

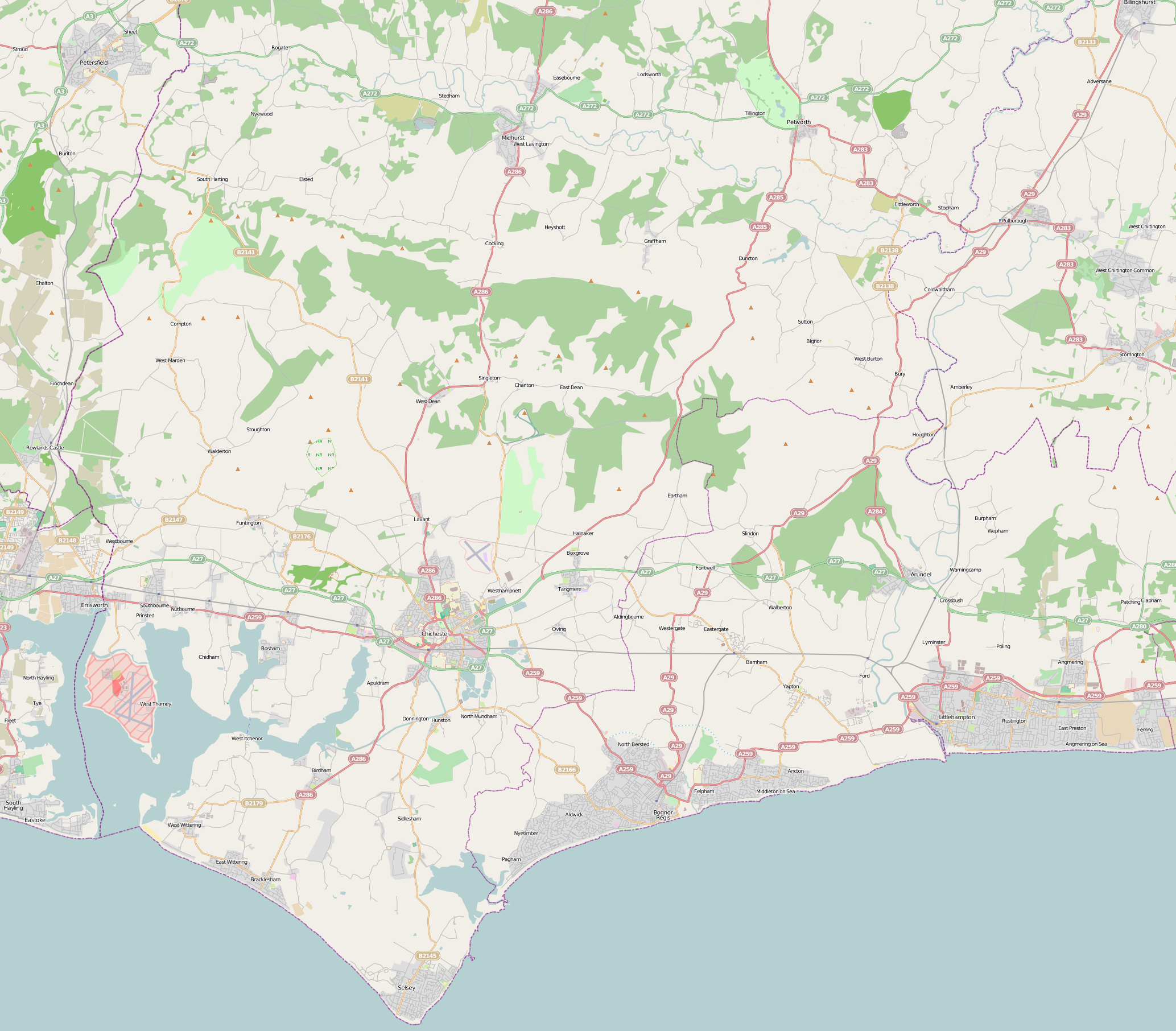
- Location of Goosehill Camp
- 50.906957°N 0.821947°W
- Location: Bow Hill, West Sussex in West Sussex, England

History
- Built: Iron Age

Site notes
- Area: 1.665 hectares (4.11 acres)

Scheduled monument
- Reference no.: 246477

Goosehill Camp is a prehistoric earthwork that dates back to the Iron Age. It consists of two concentric banks and ditches. The inner enclosure has one entrance and surround two levelled hut sites. Goosehill Camp is within the Kingley Vale National Nature Reserve, on the South Downs.

== Excavations ==
Goosehill Camp's first recorded excavation was carried out by J. R. Boyden. This excavation was carried out between 1953 and 1955.

1950s Excavation team
Post	Name
Site Director	J. R. Boyden
Site Supervisor	Peter Tennant
Site Supervisor	Frank Hawtin
Site Assistants	Pupils from Bedales School
Site Assistant	John Kenchenton
Site Assistant	Mrs. Kenchenton
Illustrator	C. H. Byrne
Illustrator	F. Hawtin
Illustrator	A. E. Sewell
Advisor	Stuart Piggott C.B.E.
Advisor	Dr. A. E. Wilson
Advisor	A. H. Collins
Advisor	G. P. Burstow F.S.A.
Advisor	M. A. Burstow

An excavation took place between 2008-2009 and was carried out by the University College London's Institute of Archaeology, under Mark Roberts. These excavations were complemented by a topographical survey and a magnetometry survey.

More recently, between 2014 and 2016 a field survey was conducted around Kingley Vale, with a programme of volunteer-based fieldwork, led under the guidance and support of professional archaeologists. (Note: The survey was part of the “Secrets of the High Woods” project that investigated the “Wooded Estates” of West Sussex and a part of Hampshire using airborne laser scanning, field survey and archival research.)Goosehill Camp was included in the survey.

== See also ==
- Devil's Humps, Stoughton
