= Decherney =

Decherney or DeCherney is a surname. Notable people with the surname include:

- Alan DeCherney, American obstetrician and gynecologist
- Peter Decherney, American historian
