= Bell barrow =

Type of burial mound

A bell barrow, sometimes referred to as a Wessex type barrow, campanulate form barrow, or a bermed barrow, is a type of tumulus identified as such by both John Aubrey and William Stukeley.

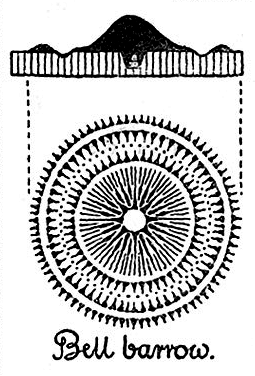
Section and plan of a bell barrow with a narrow berm

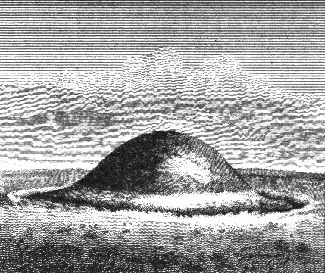
A bell barrow from Colt Hoare's introduction to The Ancient History of Wiltshire

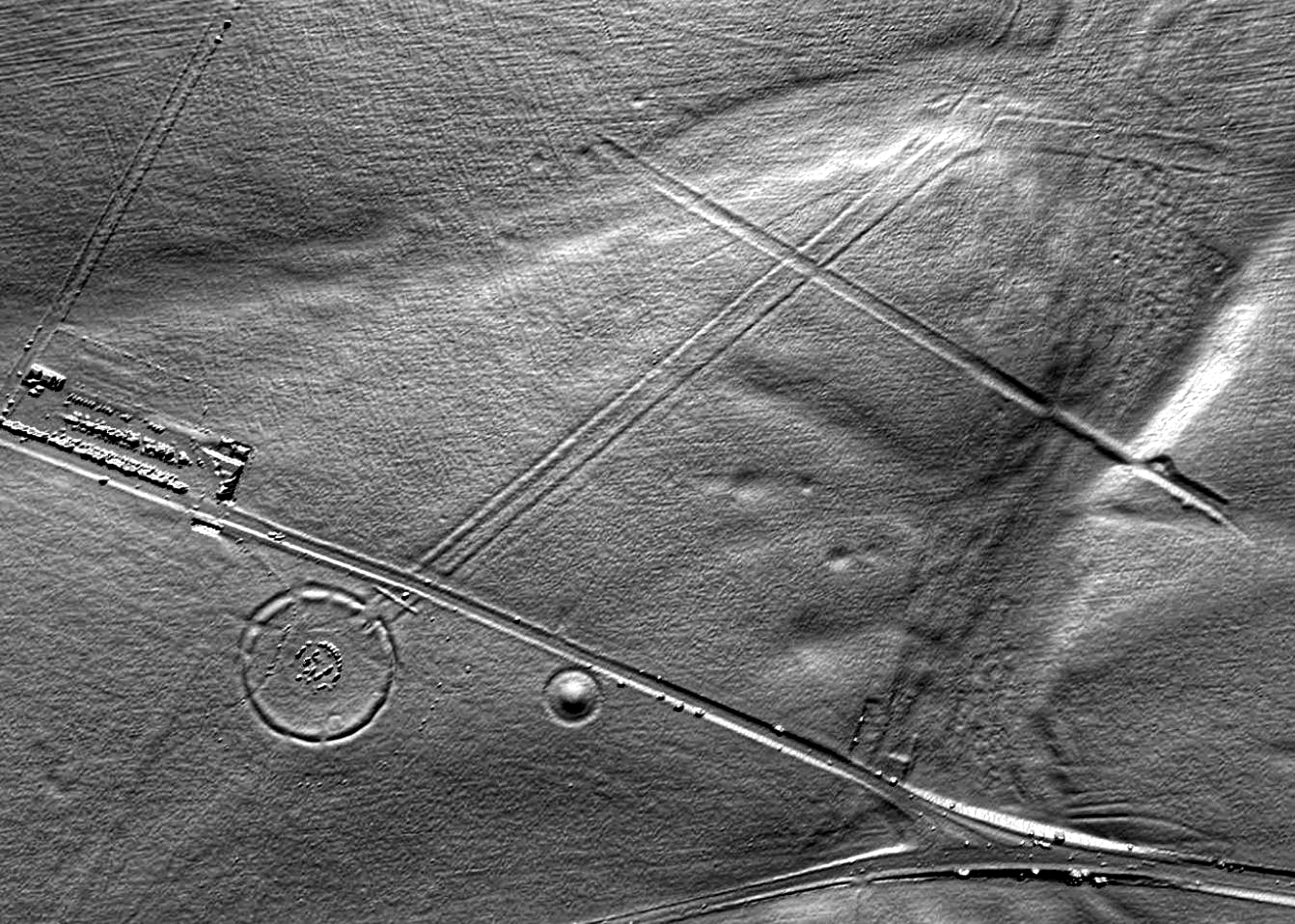
A lidar view of the bell barrow east of Stonehenge

In the United Kingdom, they take the form of a circular mound or mounds within a circular ditch, the mounds being separated from the ditch and each other by a berm. There is sometimes present an additional bank, external to the ditch. The ditch is typically the source of the material used to create the mound and is therefore described as a "quarry-ditch". A burial pit beneath the mound usually contains human remains, sometimes cremated, sometimes simply interred. Grave goods such as daggers or pottery vessels are commonly found within the burial pit also. An example at Sutton Veny included a bronze-age wooden coffin. The bell barrow in Milton Lilbourne in Wiltshire has no burial associated with it. Most bell barrows in the United Kingdom date to the early Bronze Age.

Leslie Grinsell constructed a typology for bell barrows:

- Type Ia: A single mound with a narrow berm
- Type Ib: A single mound with a normal berm
- Type Ic: A single mound with a wide berm
- Type II: Two mounds
- Type III: Three mounds
- Type IV: Four mounds

== See also ==
- Devil's Humps, Stoughton
- Devil's Jumps, Treyford
