= Pond barrow =

Type of burial mound

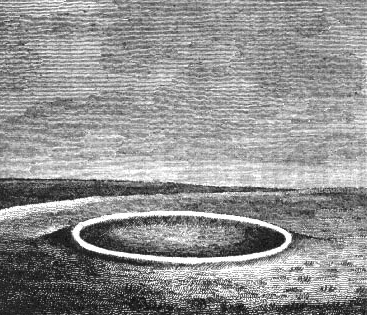
Engraving of a pond barrow by Richard Colt Hoare

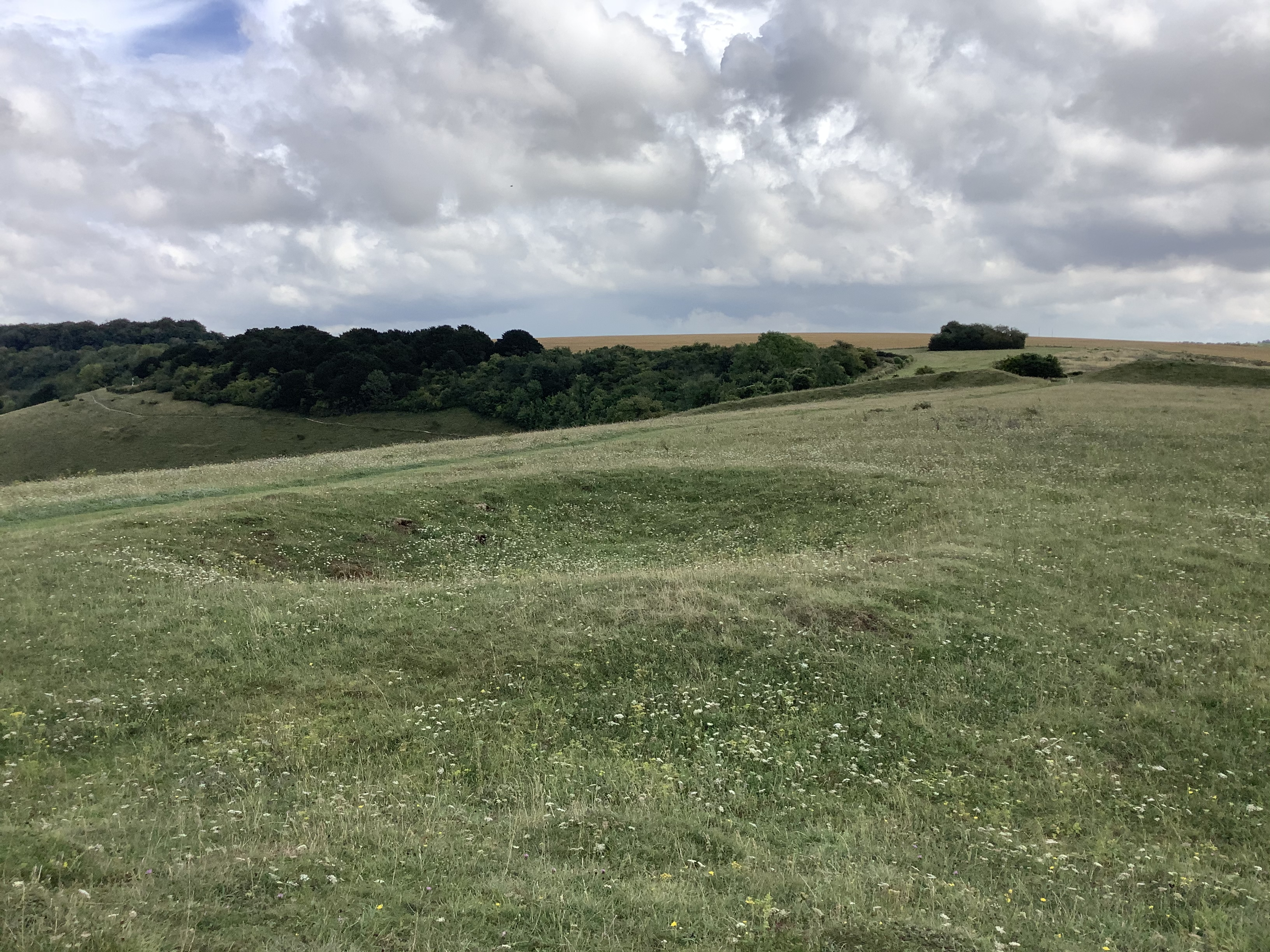
Possible pond barrow at Old Winchester Hill hillfort

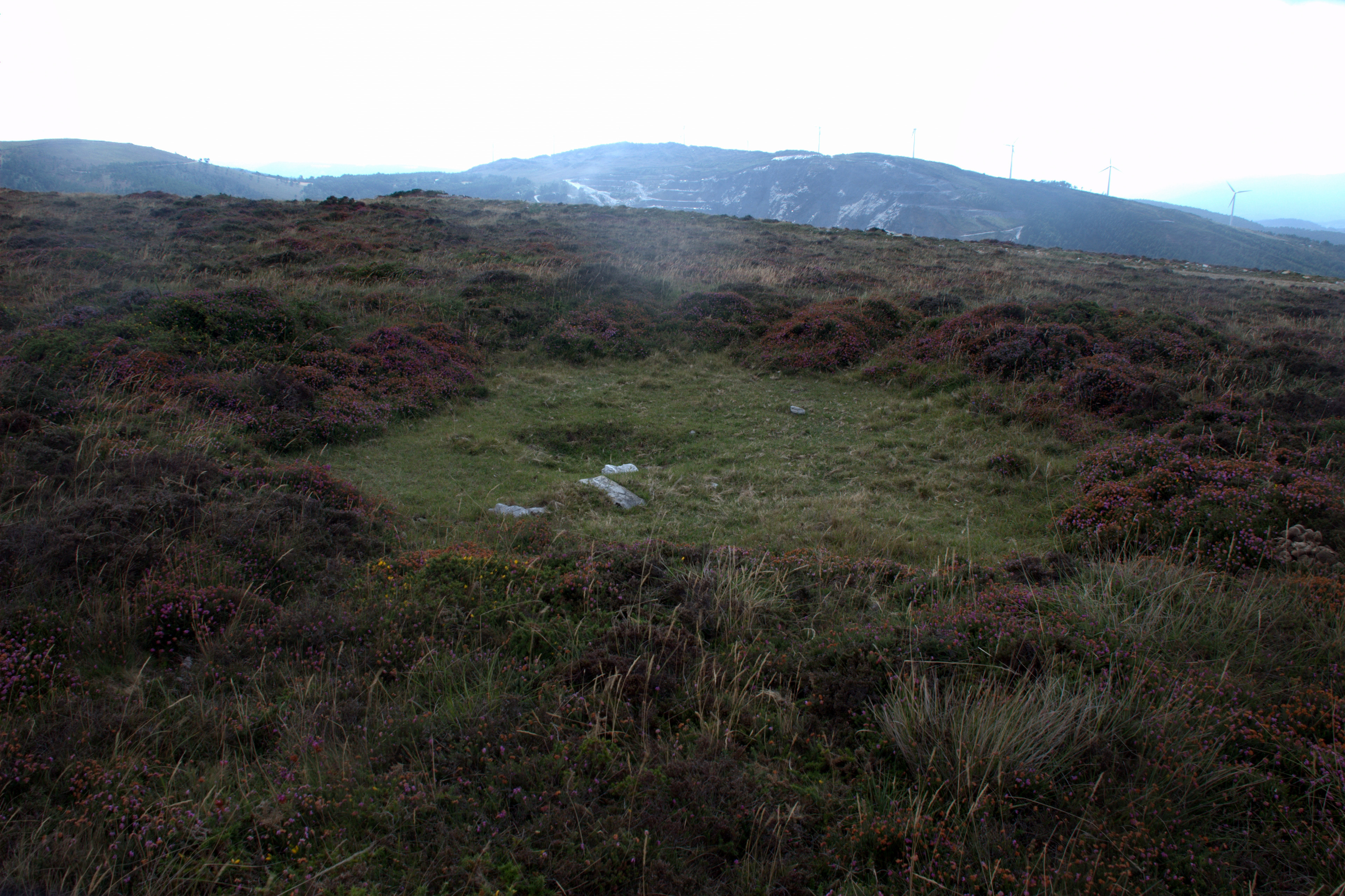
A possible Atlantic pond barrow in Galicia (Spain)

A pond barrow is a burial mound, circular in shape, well formed, and with an embanked rim made of the earth taken from the depression made in the ground.

In the barrow's centre there is generally a pit or shaft, sometimes containing a burial, sometimes of great depth. The barrows range from 5m to 30m (16.5 – 100 ft) in diameter. They are usually difficult to recognise, as time has rendered them less and less visible.

== History of the pond barrow ==
It is generally agreed that the pond barrows were mainly built during the middle of the second millennium BC, mostly in Wiltshire and Dorset.

They were first defined by Sir Richard Colt Hoare in 1810 in a book regarding the ancient history of south Wiltshire, but they were first excavated by William Stukeley earlier. The term, however, was invented by Hoare, although "barrow" refers to a hill and so this is a fairly misleading term.

== Uses ==
The fact that only small amounts of human remains are found in the barrows suggests that they may have been used as ceremonial focuses rather than graves, and that mortuary rituals may have been carried out with them. Other possible uses include wells, for communications with the underworld and for dancing in.
