= Cross dyke =

Linear earthwork

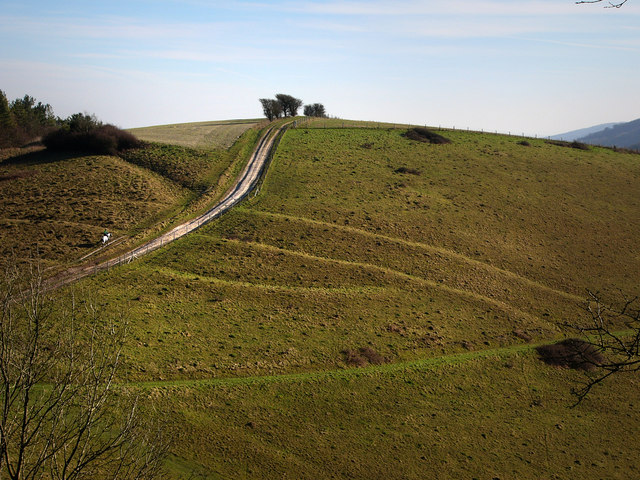
Multivallate cross dyke on Pen Hill, on the South Downs in West Sussex

A cross dyke or cross-dyke (also referred to as a cross-ridge dyke, covered way, linear ditch, linear earthwork or spur dyke) is a linear earthwork believed to be a prehistoric land boundary that usually measures between 0.2 and 1 kilometre (0.12 and 0.62 mi) in length. A typical cross dyke consists of one or more ditches running in parallel with one or more raised banks. Univallate cross dykes typically have a flat-bottomed ditch while the ditches of multivallate cross dykes possess a V-shaped cross-section. A defining characteristic of a cross dyke is that it cuts across the width of an upland ridge or the neck of an upland spur. Cross dykes generally occur at altitudes over 150 metres (490 ft) above mean sea level.

== Function ==
Cross dykes were built over the course of approximately one thousand years from the Middle Bronze Age (c. 1500–1000 BC) onwards. Interpretations of the reason for their construction vary and include their use as defensive earthworks, cattle droveways, trackways, territorial limits and internal boundaries; current theories favour the latter two uses. In southern England and southern Scotland, cross dykes are often found in association with hill forts. Cross dykes were control barriers that appear to have been a common response to upland conditions across Britain given similar social conditions. In Scotland the dykes do not appear to have served as territorial boundaries as was the case in Wessex. In some cases, cross dykes block the ridgeline approaches to prehistoric settlements such as hill forts. Since such dykes would not have stopped livestock from looping around them on the steeper slopes, such dykes seem designed to block human passage. Archaeologist Andrew Fleming has suggested that the cross dykes of Yorkshire may have been Iron Age (c. 800 BC – AD 100) monuments designed to deter cattle raids.

== Distribution ==
About 90 examples of cross dykes have been recorded in England, although many more may have been lost to ploughing, or have been wrongly classified as "short linear earthworks". Cross dykes are widely distributed across northern and western England. There are three main concentrations of the features, in Yorkshire, Wessex, and an area spanning the Cotswolds and Shropshire. Cross dykes are a relatively frequent feature on the South Downs, where they frequently cut right across the chalk ridge. In southeastern Scotland, cross dykes are an additional defensive feature associated with hill forts in the Cheviot Hills. Cross dykes are also found in Wales. Because of the comparatively few surviving examples and their importance as indicators of territorial boundaries and land use during the Bronze Age, well preserved examples of the type are judged to be of national importance.

== Physical characteristics ==
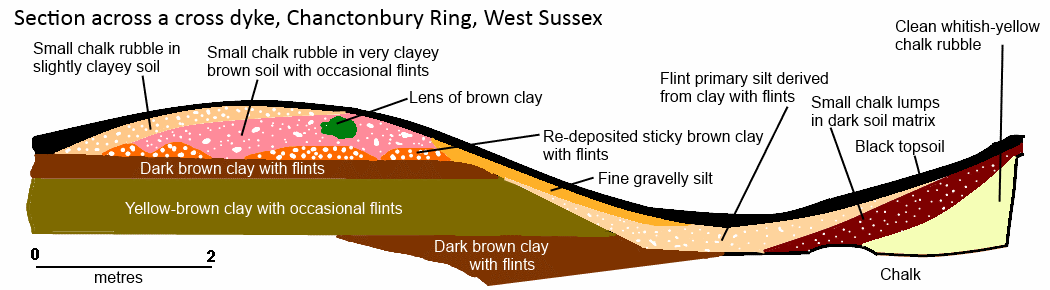
Section through a cross dyke at Chanctonbury Ring, West Sussex

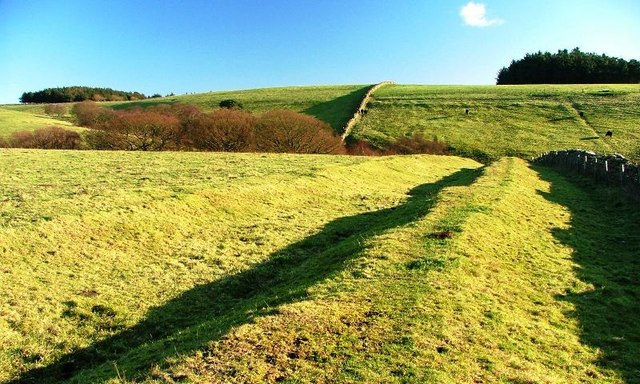
Bank of the univallate cross dyke at Far Black Rigg, Lockton, North Yorkshire

When built, univallate cross dykes would have consisted of a bare stone bank topped with a palisade, sometimes accompanied by a ditch. Archaeological investigations have revealed that the banks were constructed with rubble; some of them were then faced with stonework. Some of the banks may have been topped by hedges. Univallate cross dykes would not have provided a great obstacle to passage; multivallate cross dykes would have been more formidable to cross.

Cross dykes would have been larger when they were first built; in areas subject to cultivation the banks have eroded down to fill the ditches, in may cases leaving just a shallow linear depression in the ground. At East Toft in North Yorkshire, 0.4 kilometres (0.25 mi) of the dyke's length has completely vanished due to ploughing. Cross dykes situated on moorland often remain as notable earthworks, for example at Danby Rigg, also in North Yorkshire.

The Scottish cross dykes in the Cheviot Hills generally consist of a single ditch with a bank on one or both sides. In the bivallate examples, one bank is usually higher than the other. At Woden Law, five cross dykes were built across the ridge linking the hill fort with the main ridgeline of the Cheviots. Roman engineers later ran the course of Dere Street across the same neck of land.

== Date ==
On the South Downs of southern England most cross dykes are thought to date to the late Bronze Age (c. 1000 – 700 BC) or early Iron Age (c. 700 – 400 BC) but an excavated cross dyke at Chanctonbury Ring in West Sussex has been proven to be of Roman date (AD 43 – 410). This is the only known cross dyke with such a late date. Cross dykes have tended to be dated by their association with other monuments nearby, such as stone circles and Iron Age field systems, although such dating is not secure. Some cross dykes may have continued in use into the Middle Ages (AD 410 – 1485), with a few possibly being built at this late date. Some cross dykes additionally have functioned as boundaries right through to modern times, and they sometimes exhibit a close relationship with parish boundaries. At the Devil's Dyke in Sussex, an Iron Age hill fort adopted an earlier cross dyke as a portion of its rampart and completely encloses a second cross dyke. Excavations of several cross dykes north of Bokerley Dyke in Dorset have revealed that the dykes date to the Late Iron Age; the excavator interpreted them as settlement boundaries.

Artefacts recovered from cross dyke excavations are fairly limited, usually being limited to a few ceramic fragments, animal bones and stone tools. The construction of the banks has preserved the ancient land surface, which is considered an important resource for investigation by archaeologists. In southern Wales, a series of cross dykes controlling the ridgelines around the Rhondda Valley have been dated to the 8th–9th centuries AD, in the Early Middle Ages.

== See also ==
- Neck ditch – the defensive moat cut across the neck of a spur as part of the defences of a medieval spur castle.
