= Staines Town Hall =

Municipal building in Surrey, England

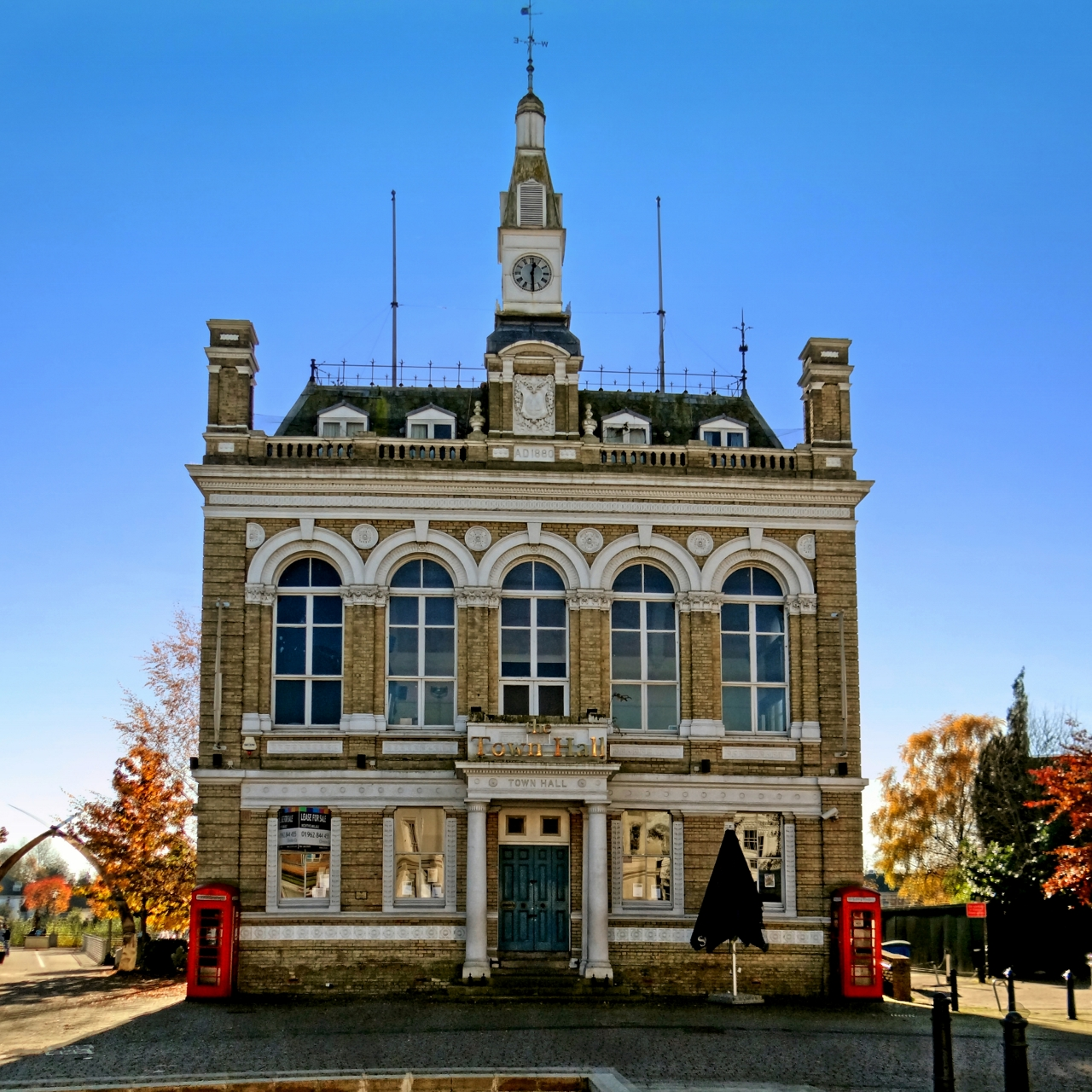
- Staines Town Hall

- Shown in Surrey
- 51.4330°N 0.5142°W
- Location: Market Square, Staines-upon-Thames

History
- Built: 1880

Site notes
- Architect: John Johnson
- Architectural style: Renaissance style

Listed Building – Grade II
- Official name: Town Hall
- Designated: 4 June 1973
- Reference no.: 1187053

Staines Town Hall is a municipal building in the Market Square, Staines-upon-Thames, Surrey, England. The town hall, which briefly served as the headquarters of Spelthorne Borough Council, is a Grade II listed building.

== History ==
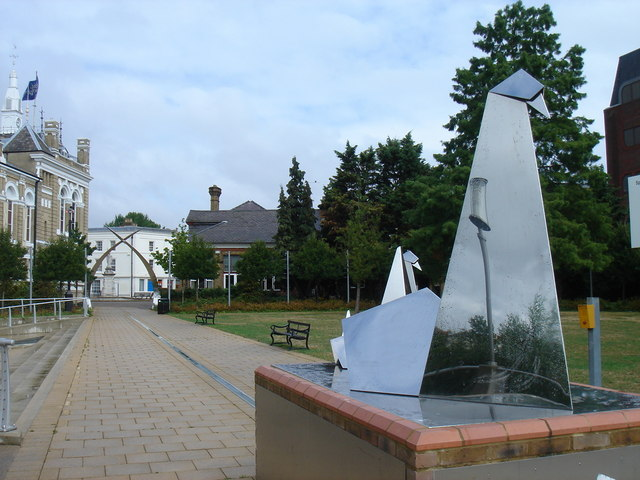
A piece of public art designed by Tom Brown and known as the "Origami Swans" in Staines Memorial Gardens behind the town hall

Staines Town Hall and Market Act 1872
- Act of Parliament
- Parliament of the United Kingdom
- Long title: An Act to authorise the establishment of a Market and the construction of a Town Hall at Staines in the county of Middlesex; and for other purposes.
- Citation: 35 & 36 Vict. c. xxii

Dates
- Royal assent: 13 May 1872

Text of statute as originally enacted

The original building in the Market Square was a medieval market hall in which Sir Walter Raleigh was committed for trial in Winchester in 1603. After a decline in the use of the market hall which ultimately led to its closure in 1862, the vestry board decided to demolish the old building and to procure a new town hall.

The new building, which was financed by public subscription, was designed by John Johnson in the Renaissance style and completed in 1880. The design involved a symmetrical main frontage with five bays facing onto the Market Square; the central bay featured a porch with Tuscan order columns supporting an entablature and a balcony above; there were five round-headed windows forming an arcade on the first floor with medallions in the spandrels between the windows. At roof level there were dormer windows projected out of a steep roof with a platform on which there was a clock tower with a weather vane. The clock was designed and manufactured by Gillett & Bland of Croydon. Internally, the principal rooms were the courtroom, which became known as the "Debenham Room", at the front of the building on the first floor and a full-height assembly hall, which featured a proscenium arch at the back of the building.

The building became the headquarters of Staines Urban District Council, when it was formed in 1894, and briefly remained as the local seat of government when the enlarged Spelthorne Borough Council was formed in 1974. However, its civic role ceased when the council moved to nearby Knowle Green in 1976. The assembly hall continued to be used for concerts and public meetings, and the courtroom was used for scenes in the film, Gandhi, directed and produced by Sir Richard Attenborough, which was released in 1982.

In the early 1990s, the building was converted into an arts centre which was officially opened by the actor, Kenneth Branagh, on 15 April 1994. However, the arts centre was not a commercial success, and after it closed in 1999, the building was converted into a wine bar in 2004. In 2005, a plaque was unveiled on the wall of the wine bar to commemorate the bicentenary of the 20th stop that Lieutenant John Richards Lapenotière, of HMS Pickle, made on his journey to report the British victory at the Battle of Trafalgar in 1805. The wine bar was not a success either, and after changing ownership several times, it closed in 2012. Following approval of a planning application in January 2018, the building was converted into thirteen residential apartments.
