= New Trafalgar Dispatch =

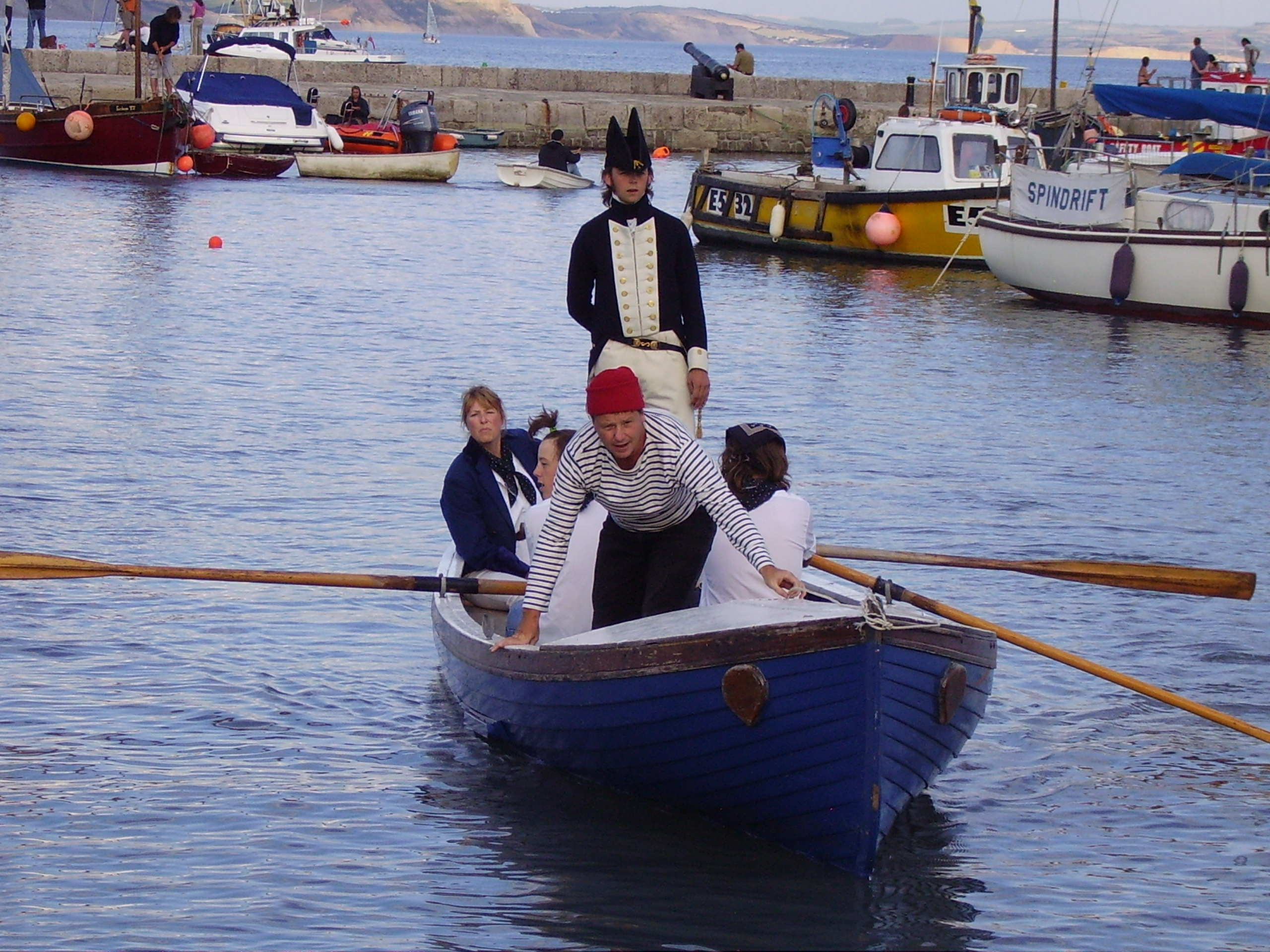
Arrival in Lyme Regis

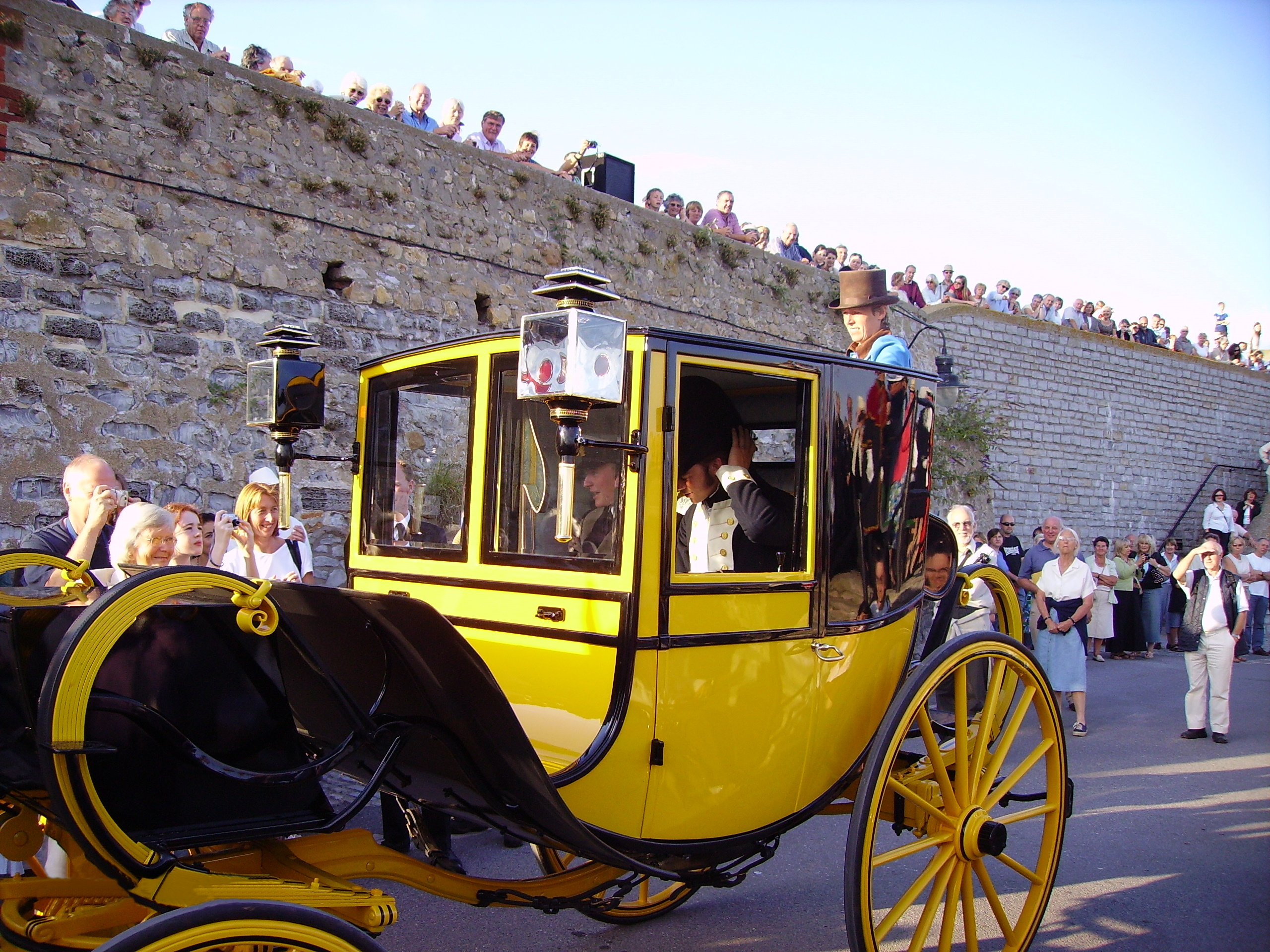
The Post-Chaise

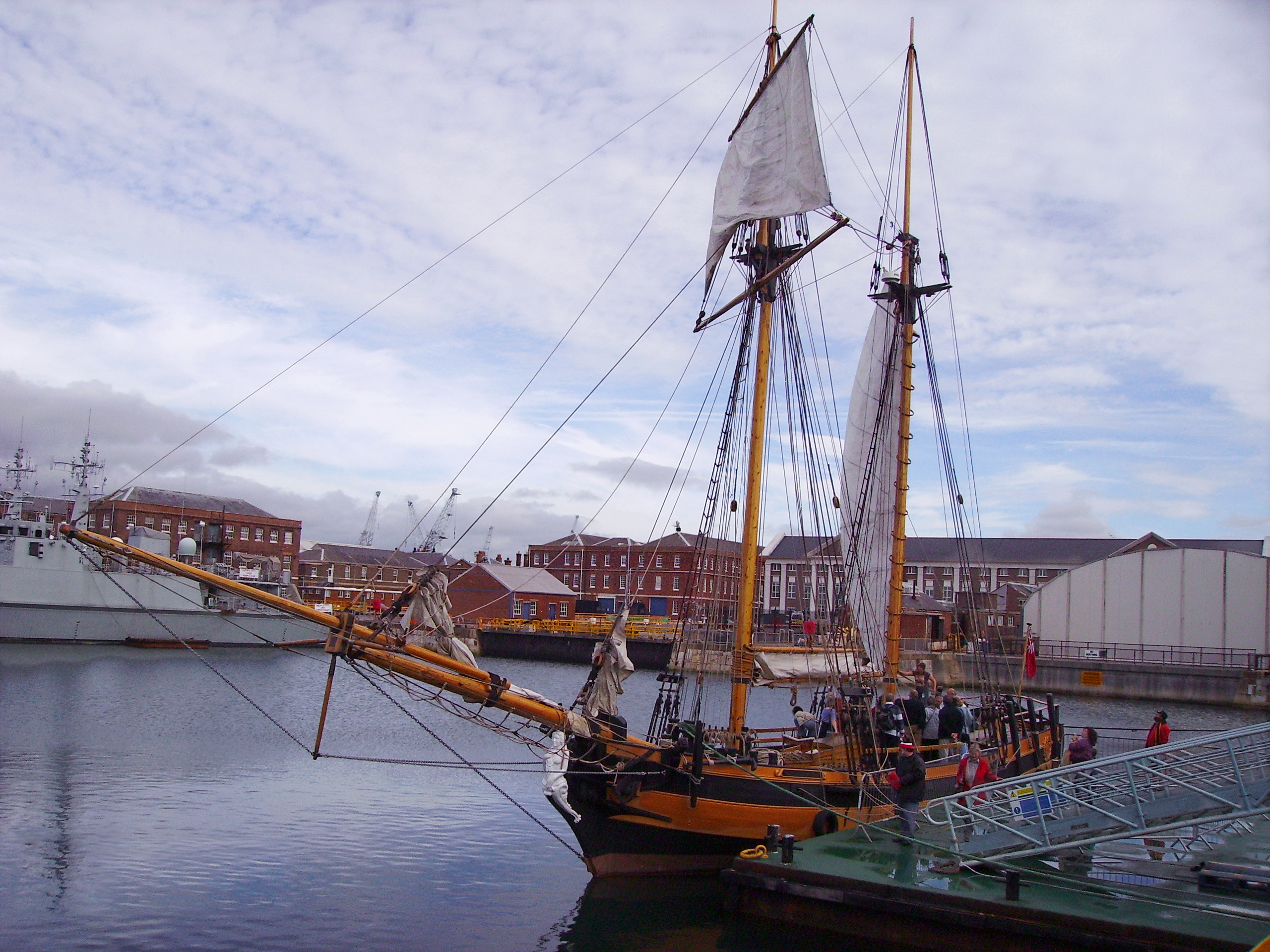
Replica of Pickle at Portsmouth, 2005.

The New Trafalgar Dispatch was part of the bicentenary celebrations of Lord Nelson's famous and momentous victory at the Battle of Trafalgar, in 1805. The prolonged and multi-focal ceremony took place between July and September 2005.

An actor, Alex Price, played the central role of Lieutenant Lapenotiere and recreated the delivery of Vice Admiral Collingwood's original dispatch (report) to the Admiralty. The original dispatch was carried by HMS Pickle from the fleet off Cape Trafalgar to Falmouth. From there, Lapenotiere travelled by post chaise to London, in the very fast time of 37 hours.

In the re-enactment, the specially built replica post chaise visited various points, between Falmouth and London, many of them on the original route. Individual ceremonies were re-enacted with the post chaise at some of the 'stops', including Falmouth, Truro, Fraddon, Bodmin, Launceston, Okehampton, Exeter, Honiton, Axminster, Bridport, Dorchester, Lyme Regis, Salisbury, Andover, Bagshot, Staines and London, at each of which was read the specially drafted message, emphasising the sacrifice and courage of the participants of both sides, in that famous battle. Alex Price also delivered the same message without the post chaise but with a historic mail coach at Lifton, Bridestowe, Sticklepath, Crockernwell, Tedburn St Mary, Nadderwater, Clyst Honiton, Wilmington and Kilmington. The ceremonies also included the unveiling of permanent commemorative plaques to inaugurate and mark The Trafalgar Way.
