= Robert Benjamin Young =

British Royal Navy captain (1773–1846)

Commander Robert Benjamin Young
- Born: 15 September 1773; Douglas, Isle of Man
- Died: 26 November 1846 (aged 73); Exeter, Devon, England
- Burial place: St Nicholas' Church, Glamorgan, England
- Military career
- Allegiance: United Kingdom
- Branch: Royal Navy
- Service years: 1781–unknown
- Rank: Commander
- Conflicts: Battle of the Nile; Battle of Trafalgar

Commander Robert Benjamin Young (15 September 1773 – 26 November 1846) was an officer in the Royal Navy. His service in small ships led to his presence observing the battle of Trafalgar in 1805 from the deck of the tiny 10-gun cutter HMS Entreprenante. Following this battle, Young performed well, acting as messenger and rescue boat during the storm, although the honour of carrying the dispatches back to England was given to John Richards Lapenotiere, commander of HMS Pickle; Young maintained that prior to the battle Admiral Nelson had promised this honour to him.

== Early life ==
Born in 1773 at Douglas on the Isle of Man, Young joined his father's ship, the frigate HMS Severn in 1781, and passed for lieutenant ten years later in the buildup to the French Revolutionary Wars. He was however unable to gain a position of this rank until 1795, when he was sent to the Caribbean on HMS Thorn, and was commended for the capture of the French corvette Courier-National and for an armed landing on the island of St Vincent in which he was embroiled in the thick of the fighting but was unhurt. Sailing in HMS Bonne Citoyenne, he was an observer of the battle of Cape St. Vincent in 1797, and was badly wounded by a collapsing spar during a gun action a few weeks later. Returning for duty in 1798, Young participated in the defence of Gibraltar and was present in the aftermath of the Battle of the Nile, aiding in repairs and consolidation of the British fleet.

== Battle of Trafalgar ==
He returned home on HMS Colossus, and witnessed her shipwreck in the Isles of Scilly before joining the ship of the line HMS Goliath and almost being wrecked on her too, when she was dismasted and almost capsized in the West Indies. Young was commended for his excellent conduct in this operation, and was even able to take some enemy prizes despite the battered nature of his ship. His reward for this was to be given command of the Entreprenante following the Peace of Amiens and to take her as a despatch vessel to Nelson's fleet off Cádiz. Young claimed for the rest of life that when the combined fleet emerged on 21 October, Nelson ordered him to remain close to HMS Victory, so that despatches home could be instantly sent off. No written record has survived of such an order, and Young could find no corroborating witnesses but Entreprenante did remain close to the Victory except when Victory was embroiled in the thick of the fight, where a single enemy broadside would have blasted Entreprenante matchwood.

Following the action and the subsequent death of Nelson, there was far too much to be done in terms of rescuing survivors, repairing ships and heading back to Cadiz to worry about dispatches. Young performed these duties heroically, even taking his little craft close to the blazing French ship Achille and taking off 161 survivors before escaping just as the ship's magazines exploded. Young also found the Bahama, whose Spanish crew had overthrown the British prize crew put aboard and were attempting to take the ship back to Cadiz. Thanks to Young's fast message to Admiral Collingwood, the Bahama was swiftly retaken.

== Post Trafalgar ==
Young reportedly was "mortified" to discover Collingwood had sent his own despatch vessel, the Pickle under Lapenotiere to England with the reports of the victory, none of which even mentioned Young's part in the battle's aftermath. The bearer of such good news could expect wealth and promotion, which Lapenotiere did in fact receive. Young, who instead delivered duplicate despatches to Faro, was overlooked and ignored, missing the general promotion from which so many other captains benefitted. Young remained a lieutenant in the Entreprenante, where he spent the next two years on blockade duty off Brest, before being forced home by illness. Young was appointed first lieutenant of HMS Ulysses in 1809 and took part in the Walcheren Campaign, where he was the senior officer in charge of the flat-bottomed boats. In 1810, he finally made commander, 19 years after passing as a lieutenant. This was a mixed blessing, as Young's lack of influence again resulted in his being overlooked and passed over for seagoing commissions, a problem not aided by recurring bouts of ill health following the severe sickness he incurred in 1807. Shortly after, he was put on half pay and never served again.

In 1839, Young received a pension from the Greenwich Hospital but the remainder of his life was spent in bitter contemplation of what might have been had he performed the famous Trafalgar Way journey, and he died an impoverished and broken man in 1846. He was buried in Exeter near his home.
