= 1805 Club =

The 1805 Club was founded in 1990 to accomplish three objectives. To assist in the preservation of monuments and memorials relating to Vice- Admiral Lord Horatio Nelson and seafarers of the Georgian era. To promote research into the Royal Navy of the Georgian period, and especially of Vice Admiral Lord Nelson. To organize cultural and historical events.

1805 originates from the year of the Battle of Trafalgar, 21 October 1805. The 1805 Club is a charity registered in England and Wales: No. 1201272.

The President of the Club is Admiral Jonathon Band. The Club's chairman since 2021 is Captain John A Rodgaard USN (Ret).

== Restoration efforts ==
The club restored the imposing churchyard memorial of Admiral Home Popham at St Michael and All Angels Church, Sunninghill, Berkshire, in 1999. In the same year it restored the tomb of Admiral Sir Sidney Smith in Père Lachaise Cemetery, Paris.

In 2006 it was reported that the 1805 club restored the grave of Capt Edward Berry, buried at St Swithin's Church in Walcot as part of their Trafalgar Captains' Memorial Project.

In 2008, it was reported that the 1805 club restored the grave of Capt John Richards Lapenotière RN, at Menheniot Parish Church near Liskeard. The club also recorded the graves of all the British commanding officers at Trafalgar and raised funds to repair seven that were found to be in poor condition. The 1805 club documented the graves in their book, The Trafalgar Captains: Their Lives and Memorials.

== Cultural events ==
According to The Times, the club conducted a 200th anniversary memorial service at the tomb of Lord Nelson. Senior members of the Royal Navy, the Sea Cadets and HMS Victory's Cutter Crew were in attendance. The club vice-president, Mrs Anna Tribe, a 3rd great-granddaughter of Lord Nelson and Lady Emma Hamilton, laid a wreath at Nelson's tomb during the service.

The 1805 Club is also the official custodian of The Trafalgar Way from Falmouth to the Old Admiralty in London. In 2020 the Club registered the trademark "The Trafalgar Way" to assert its custodianship and record the 'official' route today as determined from historic records and maps.

== Publications ==
The 1805 Club maintains a website with historical information about the Royal Navy and other state and merchant navies during the eighteenth and early nineteenth centuries and concentrating on Lord Nelson and his fellow seamen, including a list of over seventy links to other Naval research databases.

The 1805 Club also publishes the following:

- Trafalgar Chronicle, its annual maritime history journal, currently edited by Dr. Judith Pearson, Dr. Sean Heuvel and Captain John Rodgaard USN(Rtd). Issued free to members, or may be purchased by non-members.
- The Kedge Anchor, its twice-yearly printed magazine, issued free to members.
- The 1805 Dispatches, a regular digital newsletter, available to anybody interested, via The 1805 Club website.

The 1805 Club has also published monographs, including:

- Nelson and the Campaign in Corsica, by Tom Pocock.
- The Battle of Cape St Vincent, by Colin White.
- Nelson and Tenerife 1797, by Agustin Guimera.
- The Miller Papers, by Kirstie Buckland.
- Touch and Take: The Battle of Trafalgar 21 October 1805, by Michael Duffy.
- The Trafalgar Captains: Their Lives and Memorials, by Colin White, leader of a team of 1805 club writers. ISBN 978-1861762474

== See also ==
Monuments and memorials to Horatio Nelson, 1st Viscount Nelson

== External sources ==
- The 1805 Club Website
- Admiral Lord Nelson Home Page
