= Pentridge (disambiguation) =

Pentridge is the name of a village in Dorset, England.

It may also refer to:

- HM Prison Pentridge, in Victoria, Australia
- Coburg, Victoria, originally named Pentridge

== See also ==
- Pentrich, Derbyshire, which was the site of the 1817 Pentrich rising
