= Woodyates =

Hamlet in Dorset, England

Coordinates: 50.973°N 01.960°W

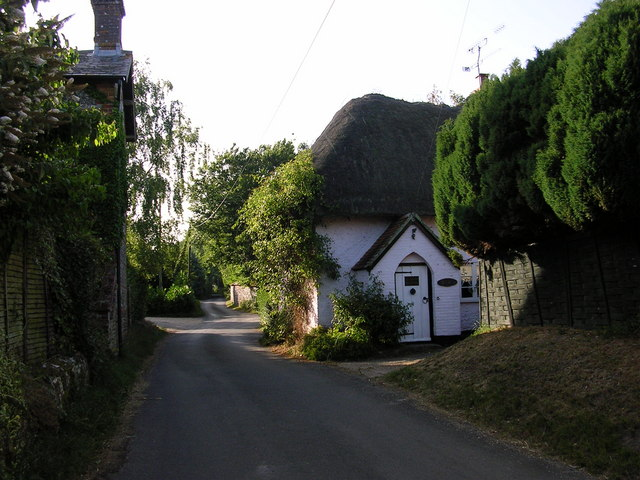
- Woodyates

- Location within Dorset
- OS grid reference: SU029193
- Civil parish: Sixpenny Handley and Pentridge
- Unitary authority: Dorset
- Ceremonial county: Dorset
- Region: South West
- Country: England
- Sovereign state: United Kingdom
- Post town: SALISBURY
- Postcode district: SP5
- Dialling code: 01725
- Police: Dorset
- Fire: Dorset and Wiltshire
- Ambulance: South Western
- UK Parliament: North Dorset

Woodyates is a hamlet, sometimes considered a village, in the civil parish of Sixpenny Handley and Pentridge, in the county of Dorset, near its border with Wiltshire, in the west of England.

== History ==
The name means "wood gates" and is believed to refer to the position of Woodyates at the entrance to the wooded area of Cranborne Chase.

The topographer James Bell described it thus in 1835:

WOODYATES (West), an extra-parochial liberty, in the hundred of Wimborne-St-Giles, Shaston (East) division of the co. of Dorset. It consists of a single farm, and is crossed by the Roman road from Dorchester to Old Sarum.

The Roman road (Ackling Dyke) is especially well preserved. In Highways and Byways in Dorset (1935), Sir Frederick Treves notes that "In no part of Dorset can the actual undisturbed Roman road be seen at greater advantage or for greater extent than about Woodyates."

A Romano-British defensive ditch called Bokerley Dyke also runs near the village.

In the 18th century, Woodyates was a property of Thomas Pitt. It changed hands in the late 19th century and in the 1950s was the scene of many parties held by Margaret Chubham and her circle.

Woodyates was the site of the training establishment of William Day, who sent out the winners of many important horse races including Foxhall, winner of the Grand Prix de Paris, Cesarewitch and Cambridgeshire in 1881.

== The Trafalgar Way ==
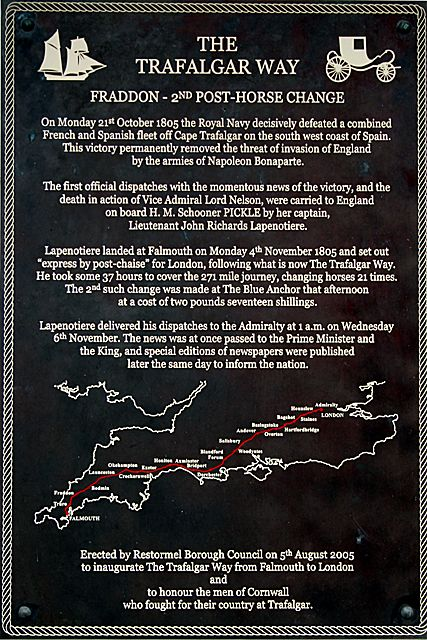
The Trafalgar Way - How Lapenotiere carried the news from Falmouth to London

The Pitt estate contained an important coaching inn, once called the Woodyates Inn, later renamed the Shaftesbury Arms. This was a staging point of what is now known as the Trafalgar Way celebrating the 1805 journey by John Richards Lapenotière to bring the news to King George III of Nelson's victory and death at the Battle of Trafalgar. A commemorative plaque is now displayed.
