= Kilmington =

Kilmington may refer to two places in England:

- Kilmington, Devon
- Kilmington, Wiltshire

== See also ==
- Kirmington, a village in North Lincolnshire, England
