= Sixpenny Handley =

Village in Dorset, England

Coordinates: 50.9548°N 2.0073°W

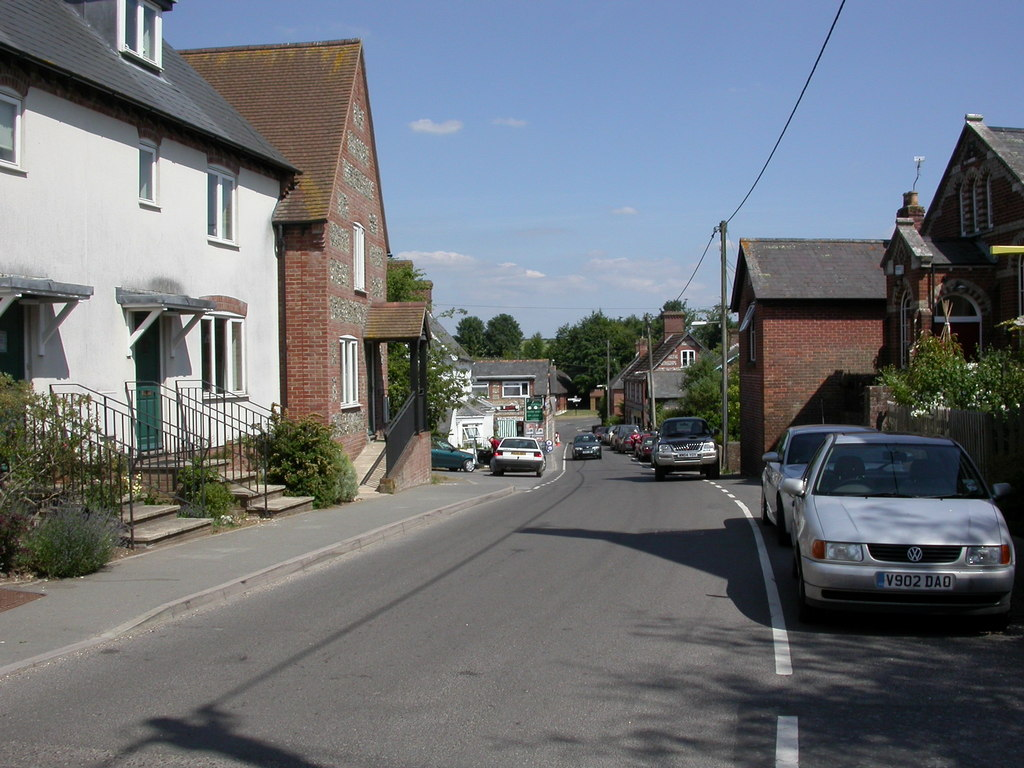
- High Street, Sixpenny Handley

- Location within Dorset
- Population: 1,233
- OS grid reference: ST997172
- Civil parish: Sixpenny Handley and Pentridge
- Unitary authority: Dorset
- Ceremonial county: Dorset
- Region: South West
- Country: England
- Sovereign state: United Kingdom
- Post town: SALISBURY
- Postcode district: SP5
- Dialling code: 01725
- Police: Dorset
- Fire: Dorset and Wiltshire
- Ambulance: South Western
- UK Parliament: North Dorset

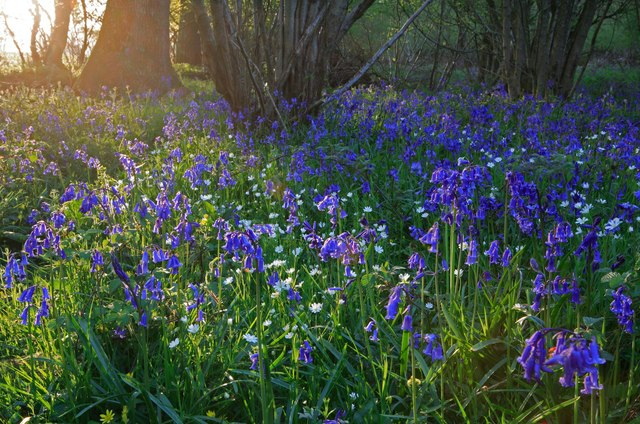
Bluebells and coppiced hazel in Garston Wood

Sixpenny Handley /ˈsɪkspəni ˈhændli/ or Handley is a village and former civil parish, now in the parish of Sixpenny Handley and Pentridge, in north east Dorset, England, situated on Cranborne Chase ten miles (16 km) north east of Blandford Forum. In the 2011 census the parish had a population of 1,233. The civil parish was abolished on 1 April 2015 and merged with Pentridge to form Sixpenny Handley and Pentridge.

== Toponymy ==
The village was originally known as Handley, or Handley St Mary. The use of the name Sixpenny Handley to describe the village and parish is fairly modern, and was being used as an alternative name by the middle of the 19th century.

Handley is derived from the Old English hēan "high" and lēage "clearing". Sixpenny was added to distinguish the place from other Handleys, and refers to Sixpenny Handley Hundred, first mentioned in the 14th century as the hundred of "Sexpenne et Henle". The hundred took its name from this Handley and a place called Sixpenny, now a farm, in the south west of the parish of Fontmell Magna. Sixpenny was first recorded in 932 as Seaxpenn, and means "hill of the Saxons" (from Old English Seaxe and Brythonic penn). The reference is to the hill now known as Pen Hill east of the modern farm, and probably marks an ancient boundary.

== History ==
On Woodcutts Common in the north of the parish (west-northwest of the village) is the site of a four-acre (1.6-hectare) Iron Age and Romano-British settlement, probably a farm. It was excavated by General Pitt Rivers in 1884–5.

=== The Great Fire of Handley 1892 ===
On 20 May 1892, the village suffered a major fire which resulted in most of it having to be rebuilt, after nearly two hundred people were left homeless. Well-wishers subsequently sent gifts to aid the villagers; so much clothing was donated that it was said a man could be identified as being from Handley because he wore two or even three waistcoats. This generosity was celebrated in 2014 by the Heritage Lottery–supported Sixpenny Handley Waistcoat Festival.

== Geography ==
Sixpenny Handley village is sited between 75 and 95 metres (246 and 312 ft) above sea-level in a shallow valley on the dip slope of the chalk uplands of Cranborne Chase. It is approximately 10 miles (16 km) northeast of Blandford Forum and 12 miles (19 km) southwest of Salisbury in Wiltshire. The parish covers three valleys—the village being in the easternmost—which all drain south. The highest land in the parish, at over 155 metres (509 ft) above sea-level, is in the north, where in places the chalk is overlain by deposits of clay with flint. The lowest land, at 60 metres (200 ft), is in the south.

Cranborne Chase is a designated Area of Outstanding Natural Beauty. Other protected areas nearby include Garston Wood, a hazel coppice and RSPB reserve. and Martin Down, an area of chalk downland and a national nature reserve.

== Demography ==
In the 2011 census Sixpenny Handley parish—which includes the settlements of Gussage St Andrew, Woodcutts and Deanland—had 554 dwellings, 532 households and a population of 1,233.

The historic population of Sixpenny Handley parish from the censuses between 1921 and 2001 is shown in the table below.

Census Population of Sixpenny Handley Parish 1921—2001 (except 1941)
Census	1921	1931	1951	1961	1971	1981	1991	2001
Population	724	719	783	732	680	820	1,030	1,170
Source:Dorset County Council

Dorset County Council's 2013 mid-year estimate of the population of Sixpenny Handley parish is 1,210.

== Governance ==
Sixpenny Handley falls within the electoral ward called 'Handley Vale'. The ward's most northerly parish is Pentridge, it then goes south as far as Witchampton. The total population of the ward at the 2011 Census was 2,491. Handley Vale is in the North Dorset Parliamentary Constituency.

== Economy ==
Business units are provided at Town Farm Workshops and also at Manor Farm just outside the village. The village has a Budgens convenience store and a butchers shop. There is a workshop garage which has no fuel pumps. There is a restaurant, two cafés, a pub which closed in 2019 and brewery.

=== Tourism ===
Sixpenny Handley is located on the B3081 road which has been described as providing "a magical driving experience", and the village is a popular stop-over for touring. Cranborne Chase hosts a number of festivals including The Great Dorset Steam Fair, Larmer Tree Festival and the Cranborne Chase AONB Woodfair; the village is always busy at these times. The village's isolated position makes it popular with both walkers and star gazers.

== Religion ==
The parish church of St Mary dates from the 14th century. It has been designated a Grade II* listed building. St Marys is a Church of England Church. It is in the parish of St Mary's, Sixpenny Handley, Gussage St Andrew and St Rumbold's, Pentridge. The Church yard is managed according to the Living Churchyards project.

== Sport and recreation ==
The village recreation field area includes a car park, sports pavilion, cricket pitch, football field, tennis court, bowling green, skate park, play park and the village hall.

There is a play park for toddlers in Keats Meadow.

The village has two allotment sites; both are managed by the village's allotment committee.

== Facilities ==
Handley has a doctor's surgery and a telephone exchange which supplies broadband internet connection. Handley is visited by the local library van and is on local bus routes. Handley is not on mains gas.

== Clubs and societies ==
Sixpenny Handley has several clubs and societies including Women's Institute, Mother's Union, bowls, tennis, football, cricket, cards, and Scouts.

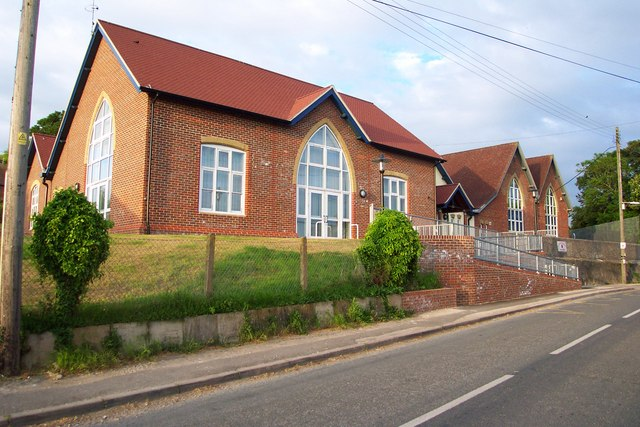
Sixpenny Handley First School in 2004

== Education ==
Handley has a first school which takes children for reception and years one to four. Children generally feed into Cranborne Middle School and then Queen Elizabeth's School in Wimborne Minster.

== Community ==
The community magazine is "The Downsman". The magazine includes news, articles it is supported by advertising and the Parish Council. The church magazine "The Seeker" is a four-page insert in The Downsman.

Most years see Handley host some sort of street party. For 2014 the Sixpenny Handley Waistcoat Festival Committee has secured Heritage Lottery funding for an event remembering the Great Fire of Handley 1892 and the generosity of well-wishers, without whom the people of Handley would have suffered great hardships.

The village's annual fireworks display is held close to Guy Fawkes Night at Church Farm Campsite. The event is run by First Woodcutts Scouts.

== See also ==
- Sixpenny Handley (hundred)
