= Southsea Shakespeare Actors =

The Southsea Shakespeare Actors are an amateur theatrical group in Southsea, Hampshire, England. It has produced nearly 200 plays, of which around two-thirds have been by William Shakespeare. It was the first amateur group in the world to perform the entire Shakespearean canon of plays, during the 1960s, for which it has won a Guinness World Record - it repeated this achievement in 1997. Members have included the naval historian Colin White.

It was formed in 1947 at St Peter's Hall in the town, with Donald Wolfit as its patron and K. Edmonds Gateley MBE as both its founder and its first main director. It moved to the South Parade Pier Theatre in the 1950s. When the Pier declined it moved again to the King's Theatre, performing there during the 1970s and early 1980s before becoming more multi-venue (albeit with the Portsmouth Arts Centre and New Theatre Royal as its main venues). It has also played at the Edinburgh Festival and has a youth wing, known as 'Upstage!'.
