= Colin White (historian) =

British military historian

Colin Saunders White
- Born: 28 August 1951; South London, England
- Died: 25 December 2008 (aged 57); Portsmouth, England, UK

Academic work
- Main interests: Military history, especially naval history and the life of Horatio Nelson
- Notable works: Nelson: The New Letters, Nelson: the Admiral and other works on Nelson

Colin Saunders White (28 August 1951 – 25 December 2008) was a British military historian, director of the Royal Naval Museum from 2006 until his death and one of Britain's leading experts on Admiral Horatio Nelson and the Battle of Trafalgar.

== Personal life ==
The elder of two boys born to a chartered electrical engineer and a former Wren, he moved with his family from South London to Frinton-on-Sea, Essex, at a young age. Educated at Culford School, Bury St. Edmunds, he attended Southampton University, where he took his bachelor's degree in history in 1974, and King's College, London, where he took an M.A. in war studies in 1975.

Despite being profoundly deaf and asthmatic, White was a long-standing member of the Southsea Shakespeare Actors and a popular after-dinner speaker. He was a server at Portsmouth Cathedral, and a theatre and cinema goer.

In August 2006, White underwent an operation to remove a kidney, following a diagnosis of cancer. The cancer returned, however, and he died on Christmas Day 2008. As a mark of respect, all the ships in Portsmouth Harbour, including HMS Victory, lowered their ensigns to half-mast.

== Museum career ==
Colin White first became a staff member of the Royal Naval Museum in September 1975 as a research assistant, rising to become Chief Curator in 1982, then Deputy Director and Head of Museum Services in 1996, with special responsibility for the Museum's ambitious Development Plan. In 2000, he was appointed Chairman of the Official Nelson Celebrations Committee, with responsibility for co-ordinating The Trafalgar 200 Festival, a national and international series of events to mark the bicentenary of Trafalgar in 2005. He was Chairman, Official Nelson Commemorations Committee, 2001-2006. In 2006 he was appointed Director of the Royal Naval Museum and was holding that position at the time of his death from cancer.

A well-known figure on the lecture circuit, he lectured on cruise ships, in the US, and in the UK. He regularly appeared in the British radio, TV and print media, especially during the bicentenary, when he presented his own Radio 4 series: "Nelson: the latest."

Colin White was a Fellow of the Royal Historical Society, the Society of Antiquaries of London, and a Vice President of the Navy Records Society and of The 1805 Club.

== Awards and honours ==
- Honorary D.Litt. degree, University of Portsmouth, 2004.
- Honorary MA degree, University of Chichester, 2005.
- Desmond Wettern Media Award 2006, "For being the most visible spokesman of Britain's maritime interests in 2005".
- Distinguished book Prize, Society for Military History, 2006.
- Longman-History Today Awards, 2006.
- Honorary Captain, Royal Naval Reserve, 2006.

== Published works ==
- Victoria's navy: the end of the sailing navy. Havant, 1981.
- The Royal Navy in peace and war. Pitkin Pictorials, 1989.
- Victoria's navy: the heyday of steam. Emsworth, 1983.
- HMS Victory. Stroud: Alan Sutton, 1994.
- Nelson's last walk. Nelson Society, 1996.
- The Nelson companion. Stroud: Sutton, 1995; Stroud: Royal Naval Museum Publications [in association with] Sutton, 2005.
- The battle of Cape St Vincent, 14 February 1797. Shelton: The 1805 Club, 1997.
- 1797: Nelson's year of destiny: Cape St. Vincent and Santa Cruz de Tenerife. Stroud: Sutton, 1998; Paperback edition, Stroud: Sutton Pub., 2006.
- The Nelson Encyclopaedia. London: Chatham in association with the Royal Naval Museum, 2002.
- Nelson. Pitkin Biographical Guide. Hampshire: Jarrold Publishing, 2003.
- Nelson: the New Letters. Woodbridge: Boydell Press in association with the National Maritime Museum, 2005.
- Nelson: the Admiral. Stroud: Sutton, 2005.
- The Trafalgar Captains: Their Lives and Memorials. Colin White and the 1805 Club. London: Chatham, 2005.
