= Sixpenny Handley and Pentridge =

Civil parish in Dorset, England

Coordinates: 50.957°N 1.981°W

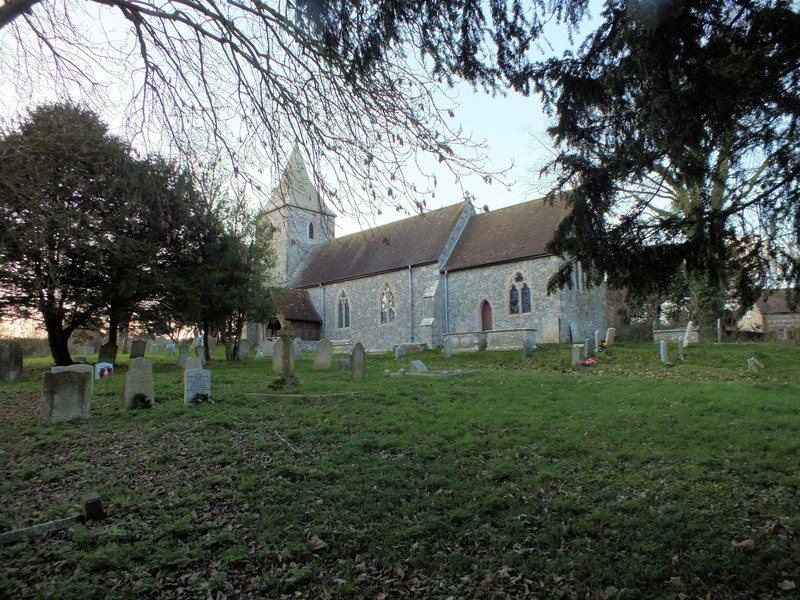
- Church of St Rumbold, Sixpenny Handley

- Location within Dorset
- Population: 1,419 (2021 Census)
- Civil parish: Sixpenny Handley and Pentridge
- Unitary authority: Dorset
- Ceremonial county: Dorset
- Region: South West
- Country: England
- Sovereign state: United Kingdom
- Police: Dorset
- Fire: Dorset and Wiltshire
- Ambulance: South Western
- UK Parliament: North Dorset

Sixpenny Handley and Pentridge is a civil parish in Dorset, England, created on 1 April 2015. In 2021 the parish had a population of 1419.

Sixpenny Handley and Pentridge parish covers the following villages: Farnham, Sixpenny Handley, Pentridge, and Woodyates.

For UK general elections, Sixpenny Handley and Pentridge is part of the North Dorset constituency. Locally, Sixpenny Handley and Pentridge is part of the Hill Forts and Upper Tarrants ward for elections to Dorset Council.

== See also ==
- List of civil parishes in Dorset
- List of electoral wards in Dorset
