= The Trafalgar Way =

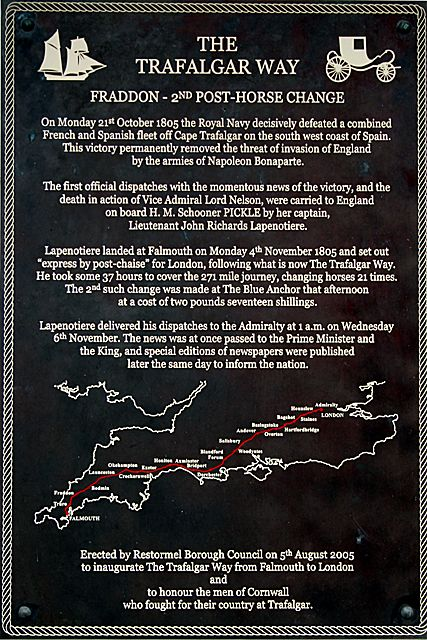
Plaque depicting The Trafalgar Way

The Trafalgar Way is the name given to the historic route used to carry dispatches with the news of the Battle of Trafalgar overland from Falmouth to the Admiralty in London. The first messenger in November 1805 was Lieutenant John Richards Lapenotière, of HMS Pickle, who reached Falmouth on 4 November after a hard voyage in bad weather. He then raced to London bearing the dispatches containing the momentous news of Lord Nelson's victory and death in the Battle of Trafalgar on 21 October 1805.

Following the death in action of the Commander in Chief, Admiral Lord Nelson, his deputy, Vice Admiral Cuthbert Collingwood, took command of the British Fleet. Because his ship, the Royal Sovereign, had been dismasted, Collingwood transferred to the undamaged frigate HMS Euryalus to control operations. Shortly after the battle a severe storm blew up and lasted for several days. Collingwood was faced with the challenge of ensuring the safety and survival of his own and the captured ships: at the same time he needed to report the outcome of the battle to the Admiralty in London as soon as possible.

== First news of the battle ==
=== The first dispatch ===
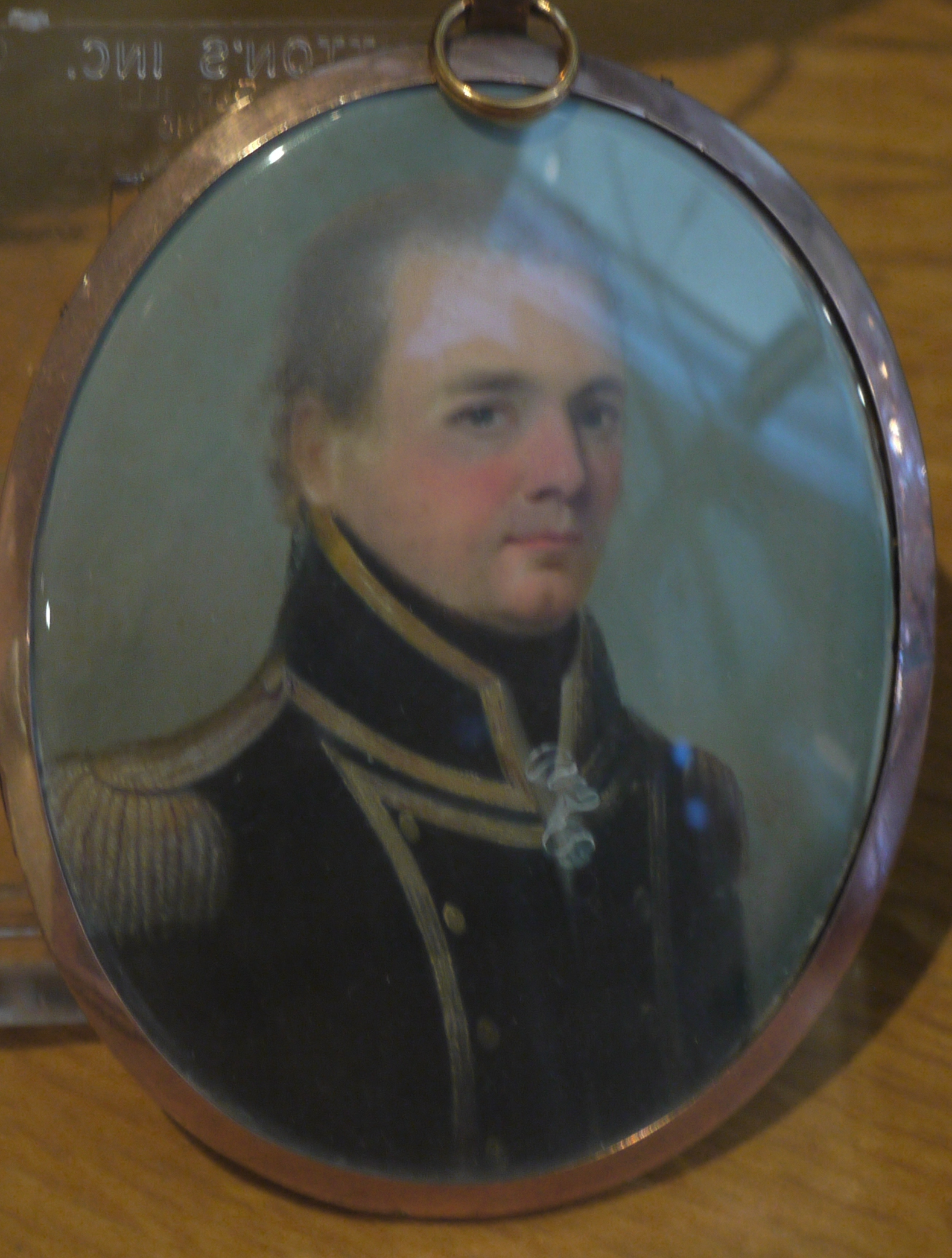
Miniature portrait of Lapenotière

Collingwood entrusted the safe delivery of his first reports of the battle to Lapenotière, but could not spare him at once owing to the storm. On Saturday 26 October, the Pickle was finally detached: Lapenotière carried Collingwood's first dispatch, written on 22 October, containing his initial report of the battle, and a second, written on 24th, describing the effects of the storm on the ships that had survived. He also carried copies of two General Orders addressed to the Fleet. Pickle reached Falmouth on Monday 4 November and Lapenotière then travelled overland to London. He rode "express in a post chaise and four." Edited versions of Collingwood's four documents that Lapenotière delivered were published in The London Gazette on 6 November and subsequently in most papers. The first report contained the words "I fear the numbers that have fallen will be found very great, when the returns come to me; but it having blown a gale of wind ever since the action, I have not yet had it in my power to collect any reports from the ships". This news triggered understandable anxiety, particularly amongst the families of the 18,465 men who had been with Nelson at Trafalgar, to learn the details of the casualty lists, or "butcher’s bill" as they were commonly known.

Lapenotière's journey was about 271 miles, taking 38 hours and costing £46. There were 21 stops to change horses on the way from Falmouth to London and his "account of expenses", which was carefully saved for posterity in Admiralty records, shows his route, where he changed horses and his costs. The route he took was the main Falmouth to London coaching road of 1805 so each stage was between 10 and 15 miles at a speed of just over 7 mph. The expenses involved for each leg were:-

Falmouth to Truro,	£1 : 2 : 6	........continued	To Blandford	£2 : 10 : 6
To the Blue Anchor	£2 : 17 :		To Woodyates	£2 : 5 :
To Bodmin	£1 : 19 :		To Salisbury	£1 : 17 : 6
To Launceston	£3 : 6 : 6		To Andover	£2 : 15 :
To Okehampton	£3 : 4 :		To Overton	£1 : 13 :
To Crockernwell	£1 : 16 : 6		To Basingstoke	£1 : 14 :
To Exeter	£1 : 17 : 6		To Hartford Bridge	£1 : 15 : 6
To Honiton	£2 : 14 :		To Bagshot	£1 : 12 :
To Axminster	£1 : 11 : 7		To Staines	£1 : 17 : 6
To Bridport	£1 : 16 : 6		To Hounslow	£1 : 14 : 6
To Dorchester	£2 : 14 : 6		To Admiralty	£2 : 5 :
			Total	£46 : 19 : 1

To date no record has been found to show exactly where he obtained fresh horses, although in some of the smaller places there was probably only one stable or coaching inn available.

=== The "race" ===
Nelson had ordered Commander John Sykes of the 18-gun sloop HMS Nautilus to patrol off Cape St. Vincent in southwest Portugal. He met Pickle as she sped homewards on 28 October and, having heard Lapenotière's news of the battle, he appears to have elected to abandon his ordered station and escort Pickle for her safety, but they lost sight of each other in very heavy weather. When Nautilus arrived at Plymouth late on 4 November Sykes reported to Admiral William Young, who feared that Pickle might be missing.

As a precaution the Admiral therefore ordered Sykes to travel to the Admiralty to report the sketchy details of the battle that he had learnt from Lapenotière at sea. As Sykes reached Exeter, neither Lapenotière nor Sykes were aware that they were now only a few miles apart on the same road in an involuntary race for London. By the time they reached Dorchester, documented accounts reported the two officers as being only one hour apart. Sykes reached the Admiralty at 2 a.m. on Wednesday 6 November, about an hour behind Lapenotière.

== Subsequent dispatches ==
=== The second dispatch ===
By 28 October Collingwood had transferred his flag to Euryalus and was able to send a second dispatch containing this information from some of the ships. Lieutenant Robert Benjamin Young, commanding the cutter HMS Entreprenante, (the smallest vessel present at the Battle of Trafalgar), took this dispatch to Faro on the Portuguese Algarve where it was handed to the British consul who delivered it to the British Embassy in Lisbon. From there it sailed on 4 November aboard the next routine packet vessel, the Lord Walsingham, which reached Falmouth on 13 November.

A special carriage carried the mails over the route Lapenotière had followed, and reached the Admiralty in London on Friday 15 November. The casualty lists appeared in The Times on Monday the 18th, thus ending the eleven days of anxiety for the families of the men of Royal Sovereign, Mars, Dreadnought, Bellerophon, Minotaur, Ajax, Defiance, Leviathan, Defence, and Revenge.

=== The third dispatch ===
By 4 November, order was being restored to the damaged British ships and Collingwood had shifted his flag from Euryalus to HMS Queen, a ship of the line of the Mediterranean squadron that had rejoined Collingwood after the battle. Considerable progress was also being made with the task of repatriating the Spanish prisoners to Spain. He was now able to dispatch the Euryalus to England with his third dispatch, and she sailed from off Cape Trafalgar on 7 November with the captured French Commander in Chief, Admiral Pierre de Villeneuve, on board. On Sunday 24 November, it was reported from Falmouth that " The hon. Capt. Blackwood landed here this evening, from his majesty's ship Euryalus, which he left off the Lizard this morning, and came up in his 8-oared cutter; he went off express for London immediately".

Blackwood followed in Lapenotière's steps, reaching London late on 26 November, and The Times of Thursday the 28th carried Collingwood's assessment of the condition and whereabouts of the ships of the defeated French and Spanish fleets, the prize list. The same dispatch also contained further casualty lists that now included first details from Victory, Britannia, Temeraire, Prince, Neptune, Agamemnon, Spartiate, Africa, Bellisle, Colossus, Achille, Polyphemus, and Swiftsure. The prize list reported that during the battle four French ships had "hauled to the Southward and escaped", and their whereabouts were still unknown to Collingwood as he wrote his third dispatch.

=== Further dispatches ===
The Admiralty, however, was not concerned because it had already received very satisfactory reports of the whereabouts of the escaped French ships from another messenger who rode into London from the West Country. On Saturday 9 November, the frigate Aeolus had sailed into Plymouth with the news that they had been taken as prizes by Captain Sir Richard Strachan off Cape Ortegal on Monday 4th.

The captain of Aeolus, Lord Fitzroy, "set off with dispatches at 10 A.M. for the Admiralty, (the horses decorated with laurels) in a post-chaise and four". The following day Captain Baker of the Phoenix arrived in Plymouth and took another chaise to London with further details of the Ortegal action, including the British casualty lists. The details carried by these officers were published in London on 11 and 12 November.

Although both Lord Fitzroy and Captain Baker travelled from Plymouth, they joined The Trafalgar Way at Exeter and followed it to London.

=== Collingwood's fourth dispatch ===
The final news from Trafalgar contained the casualty list from the Tonnant which was published in London on 4 December. It had not reached Collingwood until 9 November, when Queen anchored off Cape Spartel after the departure of Euryalus. The dispatch containing this report was sent to Lisbon and from there by the routine packet Townshend, arriving at Falmouth on Friday 29 November. The mails she carried were taken up the same well-worn route to the Admiralty.

== 2005 Bicentenary ==
Lt Lapenotière's 37-hour journey by post chaise and those of the other messengers that followed were commemorated by the inauguration of The Trafalgar Way and by the New Trafalgar Dispatch celebrations in 2005. HRH the Princess Royal unveiled a plaque at Falmouth on 4 August 2005 to launch a series of events along the Way.

A series of commemorative plaques mark the route, giving details of his journey and commemorating local people who fought with Nelson at Trafalgar. They can be seen at Falmouth, Penryn, Perranwell, Truro, Fraddon, Bodmin, Launceston, Lifton, Bridestowe, Okehampton, Sticklepath, Crockernwell, Tedburn St Mary, Nadderwater, Exeter, Clyst Honiton, Honiton, Wilmington, Kilmington, Axminster, Bridport, Dorchester, Blandford Forum, Woodyates, Salisbury, Andover, Overton, Basingstoke, Hartfordbridge, Camberley, Bagshot, Egham, Staines, Hounslow, Brentford & Chiswick, Hammersmith, Kensington, Canada House and finally on the Old Admiralty Building in Whitehall.

The Ordnance Survey produced a special commemorative map of the route with descriptive insets and a historical timeline.

In 2017 the custodians of The Trafalgar Way, The 1805 Club, applied for and received charitable funding from a LIBOR grant to revive the promotion of the route and its history.
