= Sixpenny Handley Hundred =

Historical division of Dorset, England

Coordinates: 50°57′N 2°0′W

Sixpenny Handley Hundred was a hundred in the county of Dorset, England. It originally consisted of two distinct hundreds: Sexpena and Hanlega. Sometime around the 14th century, the two hundreds were united as the hundred of "Sexpenne et Henle". Sixpenny Handley Hundred contained the following parishes:

- Cann
- Compton Abbas
- East Orchard
- Fontmell Magna
- Iwerne Minster
- Melbury Abbas
- Sixpenny Handley (originally known as just Handley)
- West Orchard

Sixpenny Hundred took its name from its meeting place at Sixpenny, now a farm, in the south west of the parish of Fontmell Magna. Sixpenny was first recorded in 932 as Seaxpenn, and means "hill of the Saxons" (from Old English Seaxe and Brythonic penn). The reference is to the hill now known as Pen Hill east of the modern farm, which probably marks an ancient boundary.

Handley Hundred took its name from Handley (now known as Sixpenny Handley). Its meeting place is not known, but a possible location is a Neolithic long barrow known as Wor Barrow, 1000 yards (1 km) east of Handley. When the barrow was excavated by Augustus Pitt Rivers in 1893–94, execution burials were found at the site.

== See also ==
- List of hundreds in Dorset

== Sources ==
- Boswell, Edward, 1833: The Civil Division of the County of Dorset (published on CD by Archive CD Books Ltd, 1992)
- Hutchins, John, History of Dorset, vols 1-4 (3rd ed 1861–70; reprinted by EP Publishing, Wakefield, 1973)
- Mills, A. D., 1977, 1980, 1989: Place Names of Dorset, parts 1–3. English Place Name Society: Survey of English Place Names vols LII, LIII and 59/60
