= Wilmington, Devon =

Village in Devon, England

Coordinates: 50.79195°N 3.10559°W

Wilmington
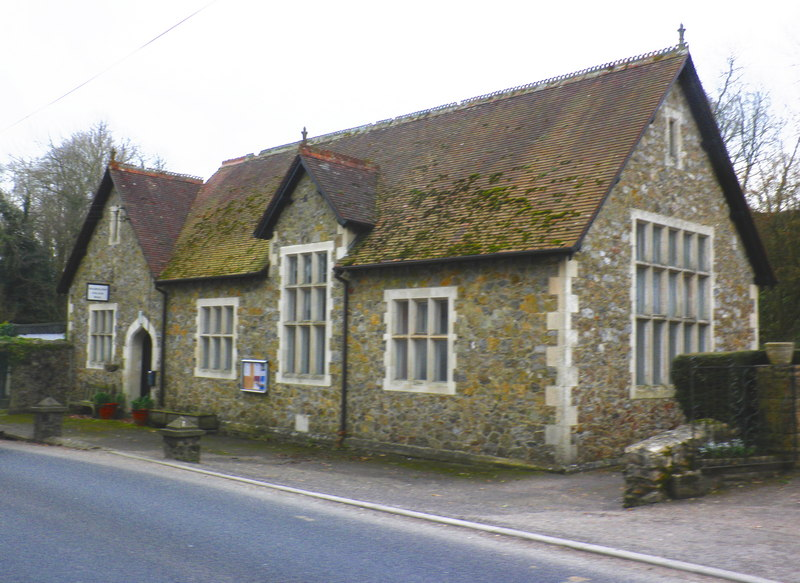
- The village hall, Wilmington

- Location within Devon
- OS grid reference: SY214999
- Shire county: Devon
- Region: South West
- Country: England
- Sovereign state: United Kingdom
- Post town: HONITON
- Postcode district: EX14
- Dialling code: 01404
- Police: Devon and Cornwall
- Fire: Devon and Somerset
- Ambulance: South Western
- UK Parliament: Honiton and Sidmouth

Wilmington is a village between Axminster and Honiton in East Devon on the A35 road.

The entire village is now in the parish of Widworthy, although this is a recent change. Prior to 1989 houses on the north side of the A35 were in Offwell Parish and only those on the south side were in Widworthy. St Cuthbert's Church dates from the 14th century and nearby Castle Hill is of historical interest.

From the 15th century onwards Wilmington sat astride the main Exeter to London road. It became the Honiton to Axminster Turnpike in 1765 but the importance of this route diminished when the Upottery to Ilminster turnpike opened in 1807, which led to a steady improvement in coaching facilities in the early 19th century on what is now the A30/A303 route over the Blackdown Hills from Honiton to Ilminster.

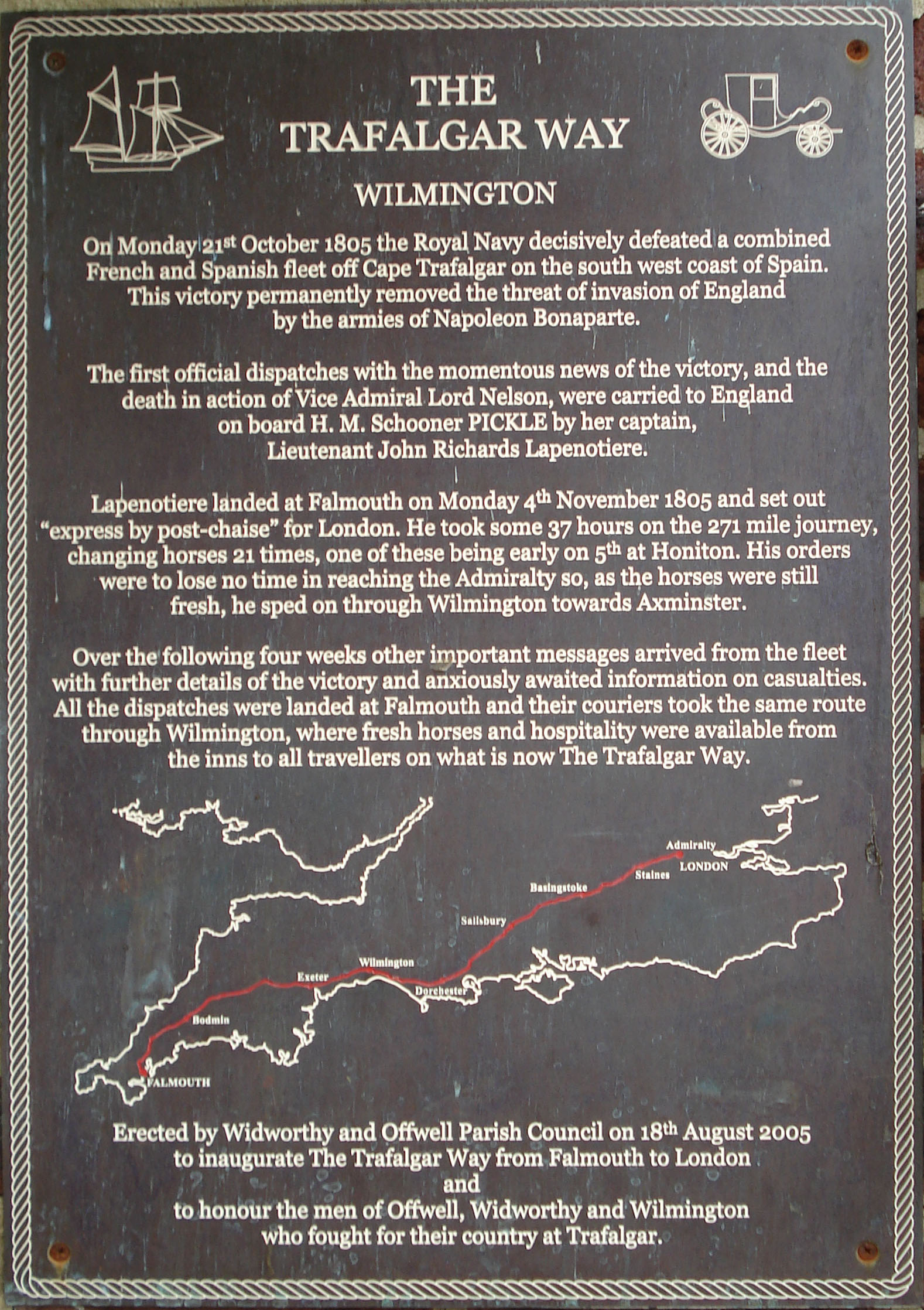
The Trafalgar Way plaque at the White Hart

In 1805 the village street rang to the clatter of horses' hooves as messengers raced through with news of the Battle of Trafalgar. In 2005 this historic event was marked by the unveiling of this plaque on the White Hart Inn. The plaque records details of the messengers and remembers local men who fought at the Battle.

The Trafalgar Way climbs out of Honiton onto the ridge by way of Springfield Lane before descending into Wilmington along the A35. It passes through Wilmington village before leaving the A35 again and climbing steeply up Moorcox Lane to Moorcox Cross. From there it descends the next ridge to Shute Pillars and then passes through Shute Woods along the line of an old Roman Road into Kilmington.
