= Pentridge =

Village in Dorset, England

Coordinates: 50.959°N 1.954°W

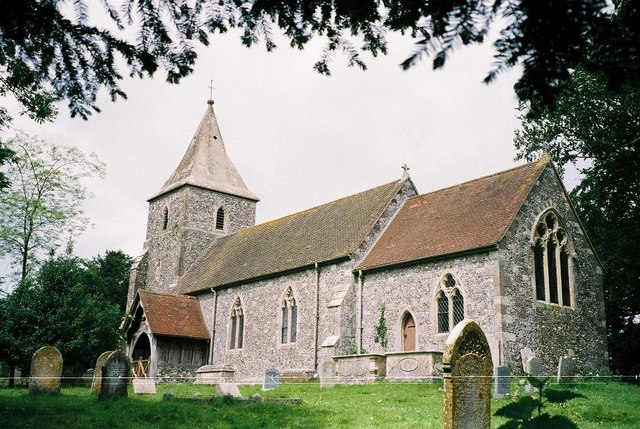
- Parish church of Saint Rumbold

- Location within Dorset
- Population: 215 (2001)
- OS grid reference: SU033178
- Civil parish: Sixpenny Handley and Pentridge
- Unitary authority: Dorset
- Ceremonial county: Dorset
- Region: South West
- Country: England
- Sovereign state: United Kingdom
- Post town: SALISBURY
- Postcode district: SP5
- Dialling code: 01725
- Police: Dorset
- Fire: Dorset and Wiltshire
- Ambulance: South Western
- UK Parliament: North Dorset

Pentridge is a village and former civil parish, now in the parish of Sixpenny Handley and Pentridge, in the Dorset district, in the ceremonial county of Dorset, England, lying in the north-east of the county. It is situated on the edge of Cranborne Chase down a dead-end minor lane just south of the A354 road between the towns of Blandford Forum (ten miles to the south-west) and Salisbury (twelve miles to the northeast). In 2001 the parish had a population of 215. The civil parish was abolished on 1 April 2015 and merged with Sixpenny Handley to form "Sixpenny Handley and Pentridge".

The village name derives from the Celtic pen ("hill") and twrch ("boar"), and thus means "hill of the wild boar"; its existence was first recorded (as "Pentric") in the eighth century, eighty years before the birth of Alfred the Great.

The village is located amongst many Neolithic, Roman and Saxon earthworks, notably Bokerley Dyke, a long defensive ditch which was dug by the Romano-British to keep out the Saxon invaders.

Saint Rumbold's church is on a slope north of the village road. One of the graves is for Roland "Bee" Beamont (1920-2001) who was a famous test pilot, and his wife.

To the south is Pentridge Hill (185 metres ASL, formed by a band of more resistant chalk than the surrounding land.

== Blagdon Hill ==
Approximately 2 km east of Pentridge is Blagdon Hill. On 17 January 1947, Mr.A.L.Parke of Salisbury reported that the round barrows on this hill had been recently "trenched" and a grave was opened. He supposed it to be the main interment, it "being situated in a hole scooped in the solid chalk". He further stated that "a few sherds of a well baked urn were found" and "fragments of burnt bone and charcoal accompanied" the urn.
