= HMS Resource =

Three ships of the Royal Navy and one of the Royal Fleet Auxiliary have borne the name Resource:

- HMS Resource (1778) was a 28-gun Enterprise-class sixth-rate frigate launched in 1778. She was converted to a 22-gun floating battery in 1804 and renamed Enterprize in 1806. She was sold in 1816.
- HMS Resource (1915) was a yacht launched in 1865 and hired by the Royal Navy as a depot ship in October 1915. She was lost by fire six weeks later.
- HMS Resource (F79) was a repair ship launched in 1928 and broken up in 1954..

== See also ==
- RFA Resource, an armament stores ship of the Royal Fleet Auxiliary launched in 1966, renamed Resourceful for the delivery voyage to the Indian breakers and scrapped in 1997.
