= Fontmell Magna =

Village and civil parish in Dorset, England

Coordinates: 50.9515°N 2.1918°W

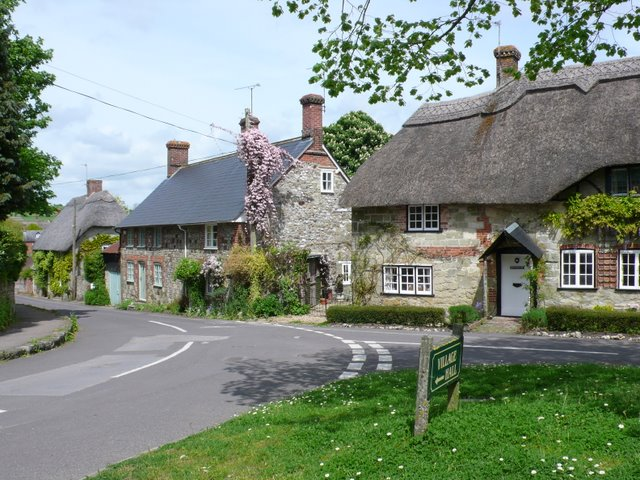
- Fontmell Magna village centre

- Location within Dorset
- Population: 734
- OS grid reference: ST866169
- Civil parish: Fontmell Magna
- Unitary authority: Dorset
- Ceremonial county: Dorset
- Region: South West
- Country: England
- Sovereign state: United Kingdom
- Post town: SHAFTESBURY
- Postcode district: SP7
- Dialling code: 01747
- Police: Dorset
- Fire: Dorset and Wiltshire
- Ambulance: South Western
- UK Parliament: North Dorset

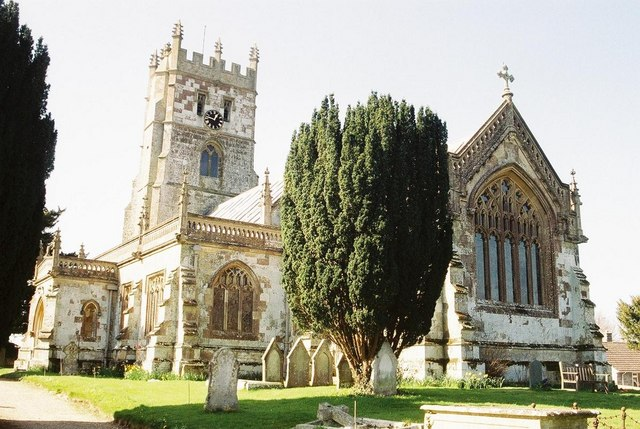
Parish church of St Andrew

Fontmell Magna is a village and civil parish in Dorset, England. It is situated in the Blackmore Vale, close to the chalk hills of Cranborne Chase, on the A350 road five miles (eight kilometres) south of Shaftesbury and eight miles (thirteen kilometres) north of Blandford Forum. In the 2011 census the parish had a population of 734.

== Etymology ==
The name Fontmell is first attested in a fifteenth-century copy of charters from between 871 and 877, as Funtemel, and 932, as Funtmel and Funtemel. It then appears in the Domesday Book of 1086 as Fontemale. This name comes from the Common Brittonic words that survive in modern Welsh as fons ("spring") and moel ("bare"); thus it once meant "spring by the bare [hill]". The name is first attested with the addition of the Latin word magna ("great") in 1391, as Magnam Funtemell, to distinguish the settlement from Fontmell Parva ("Little Fontmell", first attested in 1250 as Parva Funtemel), which is a few miles southwest in Child Okeford parish.

== History ==
Evidence of early human presence occurs in the east and northeast of the parish in the form of earthworks on the chalk hills: these consist of three cross-dykes, a barrow and a mound that is also possibly a barrow.

In 932, King Æthelstan granted an estate at Fontmell to the nuns of Shaftesbury Abbey under the condition that they would sing 50 psalms after Prime and offer masses at Terce, for the king's intention.

Of settlements existing within the parish today, the earliest is the main village, which originated before the Norman Conquest. The Domesday Book of 1086 recorded that Fontemale was in Sixpenny Hundred; it had 3 mills, 68 households, and the estate's lord and tenant-in-chief was Shaftesbury Abbey. A land survey made by the abbey in about 1130–35 shows that the Fontmell Magna estate had 65 tenants, of whom 41 were villeins, each holding between half and one yardland, and the rest were cottagers, each with about four acres. The number of mills had increased to four. A second survey made in about 1170–80 shows the population had increased to 80 tenants, of whom 55 were villeins.

To the west of the main village, the hamlet of Bedchester is also of pre-Conquest origin, though the settlement furthest west in the parish, Hartgrove, wasn't recorded before 1254. Hill Farm, over the chalk hills in the east of the parish, first appears in records in 1333.

== Governance ==
For local government purposes, since 1 April 2019, the village comes under the unitary authority of Dorset Council.

Fontmell Magna is in The Beacon electoral ward, which extends to Cann in the north, Sutton Waldron in the south and Guy's Marsh in the west. The ward, which had a population of 2,277 in the 2011 census, is part of the constituency of North Dorset, and is currently represented in the UK parliament by the Conservative Simon Hoare.

== Geography ==
The parish covers 3,200 acres (1,300 ha) and extends from the dip slope of Cranborne Chase in the east, to the area around the settlement of Hartgrove in the Blackmore Vale in the west. From west to east the underlying geology comprises Kimmeridge clay around Hartgrove, a ridge of Lower Greensand east of the Twyford Brook, Gault and Upper Greensand from the valley of the Fontmell Brook eastwards, and then the high chalk escarpment of Cranborne Chase. The chalk hill just outside the village to the east, Fontmell Down, is a nature reserve.

=== Climate ===
The Met Office has a climate station at Fontmell Magna. Between 1991 and 2020 it recorded an average of 896.5 millimetres (35.30 in) of rain per annum, and average temperatures between 1.8 and 8.1 °C (35.2 and 46.6 °F) in January, and 11.4 and 21.8 °C (52.5 and 71.2 °F) in July.

Climate data for Fontmell Magna (1991–2020 normals, extremes 1988-2023)
Month	Jan	Feb	Mar	Apr	May	Jun	Jul	Aug	Sep	Oct	Nov	Dec	Year
Record high °C (°F)	15.2 (59.4)	18.6 (65.5)	21.4 (70.5)	25.8 (78.4)	27.2 (81.0)	31.0 (87.8)	34.4 (93.9)	34.2 (93.6)	30.3 (86.5)	27.3 (81.1)	17.3 (63.1)	15.8 (60.4)	34.4 (93.9)
Mean daily maximum °C (°F)	8.1 (46.6)	8.6 (47.5)	11.1 (52.0)	13.9 (57.0)	17.1 (62.8)	19.9 (67.8)	21.8 (71.2)	21.4 (70.5)	19.0 (66.2)	15.0 (59.0)	11.1 (52.0)	8.6 (47.5)	14.7 (58.5)
Daily mean °C (°F)	4.9 (40.8)	5.1 (41.2)	6.9 (44.4)	9.0 (48.2)	12.1 (53.8)	14.7 (58.5)	16.6 (61.9)	16.4 (61.5)	14.1 (57.4)	11.0 (51.8)	7.6 (45.7)	5.3 (41.5)	10.3 (50.5)
Mean daily minimum °C (°F)	1.8 (35.2)	1.6 (34.9)	2.8 (37.0)	4.1 (39.4)	7.0 (44.6)	9.6 (49.3)	11.4 (52.5)	11.4 (52.5)	9.3 (48.7)	7.0 (44.6)	4.1 (39.4)	2.1 (35.8)	6.0 (42.8)
Record low °C (°F)	−10.7 (12.7)	−9.8 (14.4)	−6.5 (20.3)	−4.5 (23.9)	−2.7 (27.1)	1.5 (34.7)	2.8 (37.0)	3.0 (37.4)	−0.7 (30.7)	−6.0 (21.2)	−7.7 (18.1)	−12.7 (9.1)	−12.7 (9.1)
Average precipitation mm (inches)	93.8 (3.69)	67.0 (2.64)	64.3 (2.53)	66.6 (2.62)	54.4 (2.14)	54.6 (2.15)	55.9 (2.20)	66.7 (2.63)	64.2 (2.53)	100.1 (3.94)	108.3 (4.26)	100.8 (3.97)	896.5 (35.30)
Average precipitation days (≥ 1.0 mm)	13.2	11.4	10.4	10.3	8.9	8.6	8.6	9.7	9.4	13.0	13.8	13.5	130.7
Mean monthly sunshine hours	51.1	70.0	109.7	176.1	196.6	185.8	189.6	172.8	131.4	92.8	61.7	45.5	1,483
Source 1: Met Office
Source 2: Starlings Roost Weather

== Demography ==
In the 2011 census Fontmell Magna civil parish had 334 dwellings, 319 households and a population of 734.

The population of the parish in the censuses between 1921 and 2011 is shown in the table below:

Census Population of Fontmell Magna Parish 1921—2001 (except 1941)
Census	1921	1931	1951	1961	1971	1981	1991	2001	2011
Population	460	448	534	541	540	560	540	670	734
Source:Dorset County Council

== Notable buildings ==
There are 45 structures within Fontmell Magna civil parish that have been listed by Historic England for their architectural or historical interest. There are no structures listed as Grade I – the designation of highest significance – but the parish church is designated as Grade II*. All the other listings are Grade II. In 1906 Sir Frederick Treves described the church as "one of the handsomest in Dorsetshire".

== Notable residents ==
Lieutenant Philip Salkeld V.C., who was awarded the Victoria Cross for his role in blowing open the Kashmir Gate in Delhi, India, in 1857, was born and grew up in Fontmell Magna, where his father was the rector.

In 1930, art collector Lord Ivor Spencer-Churchill bought the Springhead estate near Fontmell Magna. In 1934, writer and rural revivalist Rolf Gardiner and his wife Marabel bought a cottage on the estate, which they farmed. Gardiner was active in Dorset society, becoming a member of Dorset County Council between 1937–1946, High Sheriff of Dorset 1967–68, President of the Dorset Federation of Young Farmers Clubs 1944–46, a Chairman and then President of the Dorset branch of the Council for the Protection of Rural England between 1957-1972 as well as other rural and landscape committees and working parties.

The Gardiners' son, orchestral conductor Sir John Eliot Gardiner CBE FKC, was born in Fontmell Magna in 1943.

The village was also home to cinematographer Oswald Morris (1915–2014) in the last twenty years of his life.
