= HMS Pickle (1800) =

Schooner of the Royal Navy

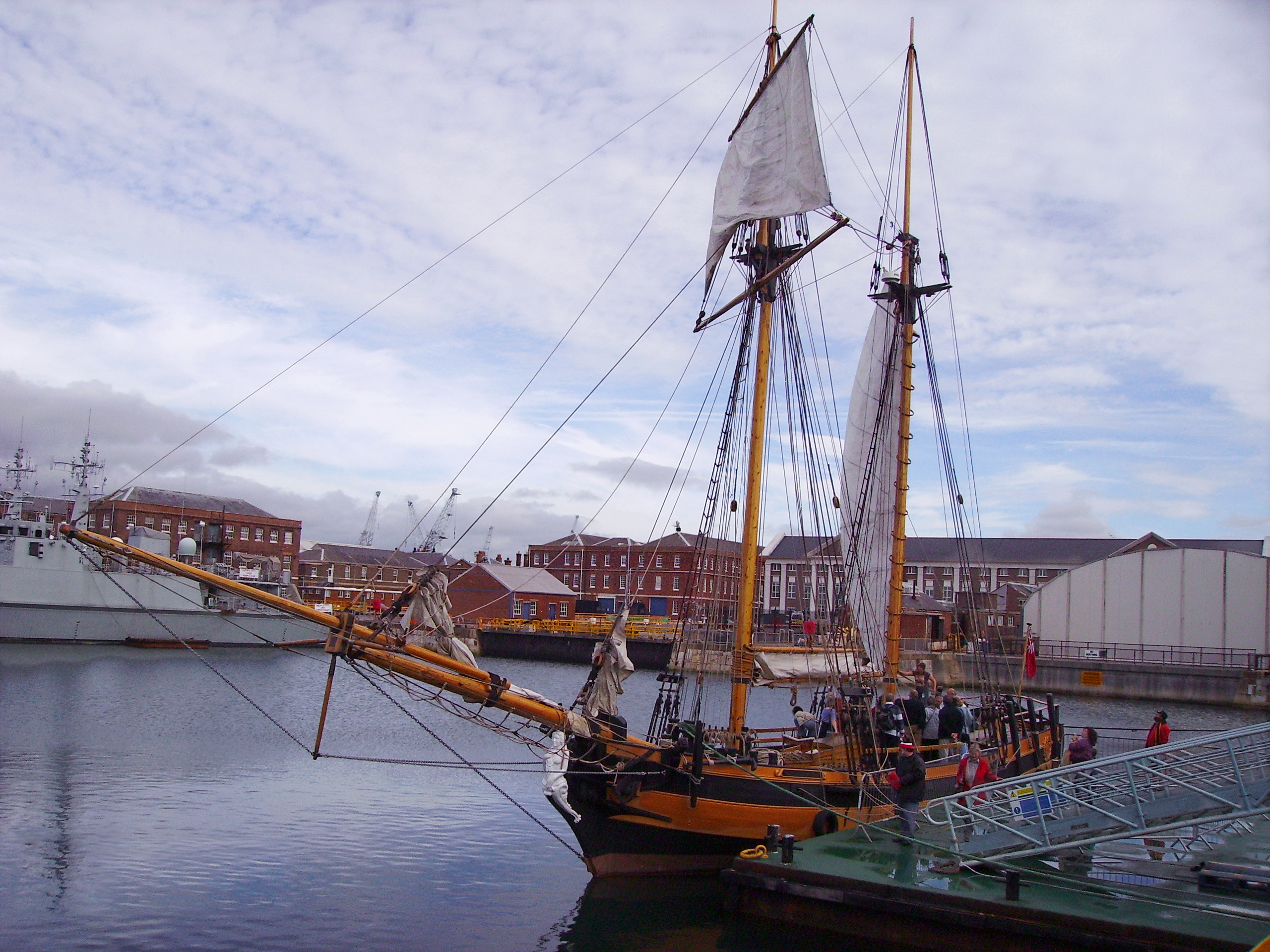
- A replica of HMS Pickle

History

United Kingdom
- Name: HMS Pickle
- Launched: 1799
- Acquired: Purchased January 1801 as Sting
- Renamed: Pickle, 1802
- Honours and awards: Naval General Service Medal with clasps: "Trafalgar"; "Pickle 3 Jany. 1807"
- Fate: Wrecked 27 July 1808

General characteristics
- Class & type: Topsail schooner
- Tons burthen: 127 (bm)
- Length: 73 ft (22.3 m) (gundeck); 56 ft 3 3/4 in (17.2 m)
- Beam: 20 ft 7 1/4 in (6.3 m)
- Depth of hold: 9 ft 6 in (2.9 m)
- Propulsion: Sails
- Sail plan: Gaff rig with square topsail on foremast
- Complement: about 40
- Armament: 8 × 12-pounder carronades

HMS Pickle was an 8-gun schooner of the Royal Navy. She was originally the 6-gun merchantman Sting that Lord Hugh Seymour purchased to use as a ship's tender on the Jamaica Station. She was present at the Battle of Trafalgar, and though too small to take part in the fighting she was the first ship to bring the news of the British victory to England. Pickle also participated in a notable single-ship action when she captured the French privateer Favorite in 1807. Pickle was wrecked in 1808 without loss of life.

== Origins ==
Originally named Sting, Pickle was built in 1799 in Bermuda, where this type of vessel was known as a Bermuda sloop. Vice-Admiral Lord Hugh Seymour, the commander in chief on the Jamaica Station, formally purchased Sting in December 1800 for £2,500, after having leased her for some time at £10 per day. His purchase was in defiance of orders not to purchase vessels. However, faced with a fait accompli, the Admiralty issued an order in February 1801 that her name be changed to Pickle.

Between April and June 1800, on the Leeward Island station, a Pickle participated in the capture of four prizes and a recapture. Sting may have been known as Pickle on station long before the Admiralty made her name change official; the London Gazette seems to have no mention of a Sting during this period.

That said, the Naval Chronicle numbers the "schooner Sting" among the vessels escorting the convoy in which Lowestoffe wrecked on 10 August 1801. The Admiralty admonished Sting's commander after September 1801, Lieutenant Thomas Thrush, to cease referring to her as Sting and to refer to her as Pickle.

The 28 November 1801, the Bermuda Gazette (not to be confused with the later Royal Gazette) reported his Majesty's schooner Sting as having departed Jamaica on the morning of 17 September 1801, for Great Britain, carrying the body of Vice-Admiral Lord Hugh Seymour.

== French Revolutionary Wars ==
On 9 April 1800, the tenders Pickle and Garland recaptured the schooner Hero. Hero had a crew of seven men and was of 136 tons burthen (bm). She was out of Guadeloupe, sailing from Pointe Petre to Saint Bartholomew with a load of cordwood. A week later, the same two vessels captured the Dutch schooner Maria. She had a crew of 19 men, armed with small arms, and was of 35 tons burthen (bm). She was from Curaçao, sailing from Curaçao to Guadeloupe with a cargo of dry goods. Then on 9 May, Pickle alone took the schooner Jack, of Boston, sailing from Boston to Martinique with a cargo of cattle. Pickle's commander is given as Mr. William Black.

Later, on 26 May, Pickle, described as the tender to Captain William Browell's ship of the line Sans Pareil recaptured the schooner John, William Jeffrey, Master. (Note: Sans Pareil was Seymour's flagship, though by then Browell was no longer captain.) The French privateer Brilliant had captured the John, which had been sailing from Boston to Martinique. Lastly, on 30 June, Pickle and the tender Gipsy captured the French privateer schooner Fidelle, which was armed with four guns and had a crew of 61 men. She was from Guadeloupe and on a privateering cruise when the two British vessels captured her.

On 11 September Captain Frederick Watkins sailed Nereide to Curaçao to forestall the French from taking it. Then on 13 September he took possession and signed the terms of capitulation on behalf of the British. Sting apparently acted as a tender to the flagship there.

The schooner Sting is listed as one of the escorts of a convoy that formed on 29 July 1801 when Lowestoffe came to escort it. Lowestoffe and five merchant vessels were wrecked, with little loss of life, on 10 August. The subsequent court martial of Captain Robert Plampin of Lowestoffe, which exonerated him and his officers, took place in Kingston, Jamaica on 3 September.

Then on 25 September 1801 a privateer hoisting the Spanish flag unsuccessfully engaged Pickle in a single-ship action that resulted in the death of her commander, Lieutenant Greenshields, and the wounding of Midshipman Pierce, the master, Thomas Hayer, and seven others of her crew. At 11am, some five or six miles NW of the Isle of Ash (aka Île à Vache or Cow Island, south of Hispaniola), Pickle sighted a vessel flying the British flag and sailing towards it. When the vessel got within pistol-shot, he hauled up the Spanish flag and opened fire. The fight lasted an hour and a quarter, with a musket ball through the body killing Greenshields about 40 minutes in. The Spanish vessel then tried to board Pickle, but when the Spaniard was unable to do so, he fled. Pickle chased the privateer for an hour and a half but the privateer was faster and Pickle gave up the chase. Hayer, who wrote the report of the action, described the privateer as having two 12-pounder and two 9-pounder guns, and a crew of about 70 men. Pickle had a crew of 35, of whom three were incapacitated by illness.

Thomas Thrush, a lieutenant on Sans Pareil, next assumed command. (Note: Winfield has Thrush commissioning Sting in December 1800. However, this is inconsistent with the evidence of earlier commanders such as Mr. Black and Lieutenant Greenshields.) He then received the duty of bringing Seymour's body back to England, the admiral having died on 11 September, of a fever.

On 24 March 1802, Pickle came under the command of Lieutenant John Richards Lapenotière. He may not actually have assumed command until May. (Note: Hore has Lapenotière first having to pay off the hired armed cutter Joseph in early 1802. However, Winfield has Joseph leaving Royal Navy service on 8 September 1801.)

On 16 February, Pickle arrived from Malta after a 14-day voyage. She was carrying urgent dispatches, so after meeting with Rear-Admiral Dacres her captain rushed off in a post chaise and four for the Admiralty while the vessel itself went into quarantine at Coney Cove, Stonehouse Pool. (Note: The Naval Chronicle gives the captain's name as Lieutenant Pelletier, but this is clearly a mistake as Lapenotière was her commander at the time and there is no other trace of a Lieutenant Pelletier.)

== Napoleonic Wars ==
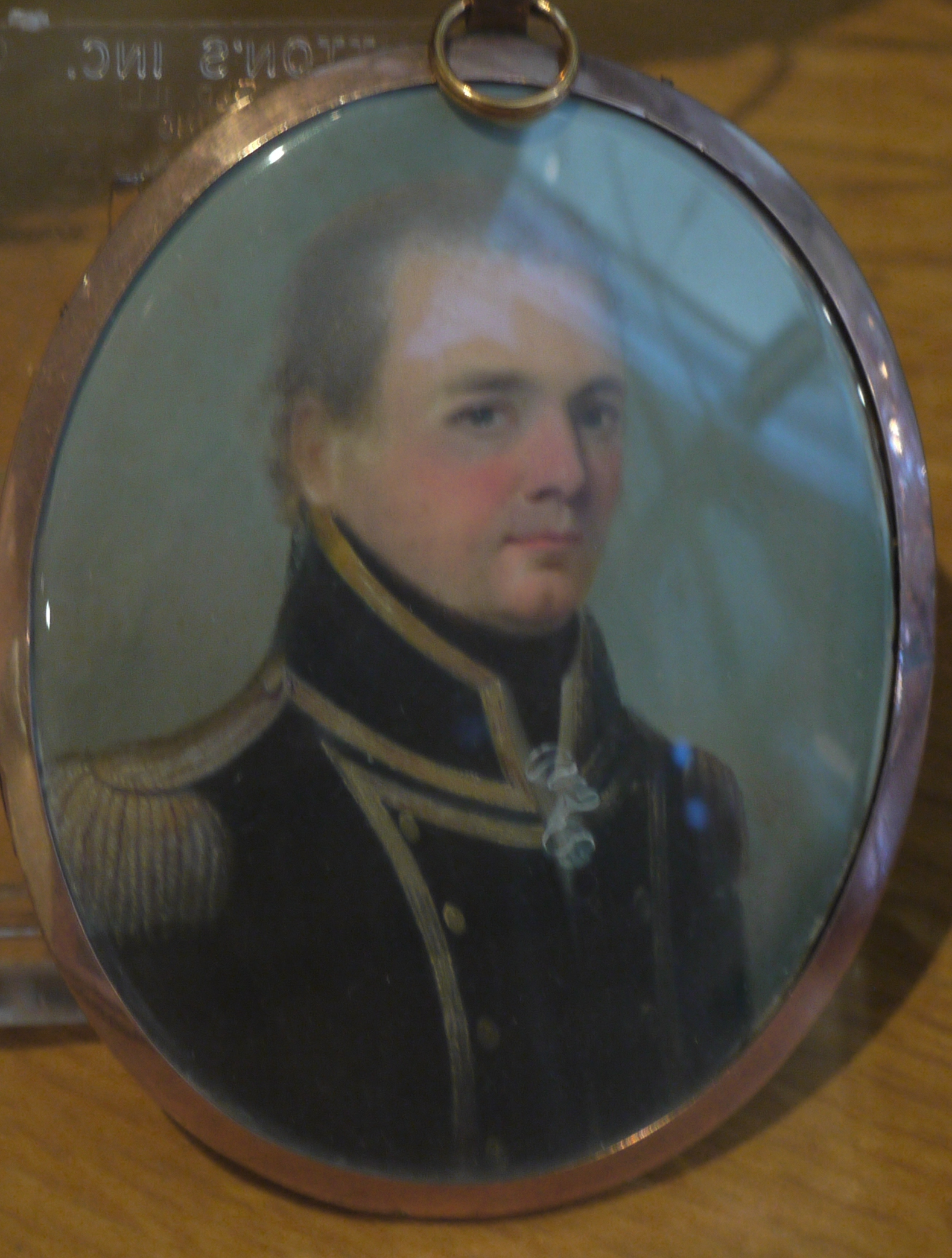
Miniature portrait of Lapenotière

In 1803, Pickle was attached to Admiral William Cornwallis' Inshore Squadron, where she reconnoitered enemy harbours during the blockade of Brest, Rochefort and Lorient. On 1 June, Pickle was in company with Diana when they took the French brig Euphrosiné. Then on 9 July, Pickle captured the Prudent. Pickle sailed from Plymouth on 15 October, to cruise in the Channel and on 22 October, she detained the American vessel Resolution. Pickle sailed from Plymouth again on 28 December, and returned on 31 January 1804, having lost her main-topmast and fore-yard in a gale on the 19th. On 25 March 1804, Pickle went to the assistance of Magnificent, which had run onto a shoal off Brest. Pickle and the frigate Fox came alongside soon after Magnificent struck, as did Indefatigable and Aigle. The vessels then rescued Magnificent's crew before she foundered.

On 26 July, the flagship in the Hamoaze made a signal, at which a seaman from Pickle, attended by the boats of the fleet, manned and armed, was flogged around the fleet in the Hamoaze and the Sound. Lapenotière had charged the man with mutiny, a charge the court martial board dismissed. However they did find the man guilty of insolence, desertion, and disobedience. At the same time a seaman from Doris was flogged around the fleet for having attempted to kill a messmate asleep in his hammock. On 24 and 25 September, Pickle captured two French chasse-marées loaded with supplies for the French fleet at Brest and brought them into Plymouth. Lapenotière had driven them into the Bay there and then sent his boats to bring them out. Boadicea was in sight. The two French vessels may have been Marie Française from Bordeaux and Desirée from Quimper.

Pickle was in company with Naiad on 9 July 1805, when they captured the brig Argo and the sloop Nelly. Then on 19 July, Pickle found herself becalmed in the Straits of Gibraltar. Two Spanish gunboats came up and fired on her until there was enough wind for Pickle to be able to maneuver to bring her broadsides to bear, at which point she was able to chase the gunboats towards Tarifa. However, the wind faltered, and seven Spanish gunboats came out to harass Pickle. Pickle was able to tack to the shelter of Fort Tangier, though one gunboat continued to harass her until the wind was strong enough for Pickle to sail away and return to the British fleet. Despite the duration of the engagement, Pickle suffered only one man wounded.

On 29 September Pickle captured the American brig Indefatigable. Then on 9 October, Pickle accompanied Weazel (or Weazle) when they went to assist Captain Henry Blackwood in watching the coast off Cádiz, and to provide reconnaissance services for the fleet. Pickle managed to sail close enough to the coast to provide an exact count of the enemy warships in Cádiz harbour. Also, Pickle apparently managed to capture a Portuguese settee carrying bullocks from Tangiers to Cádiz.

=== Battle of Trafalgar ===
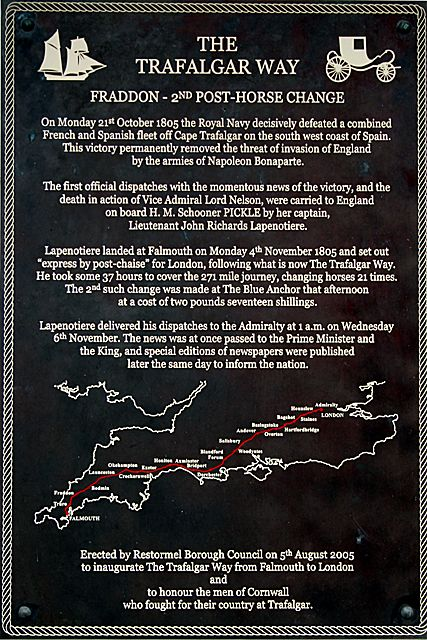
Plaque depicting The Trafalgar Way

During the Battle of Trafalgar (21 October 1805), Pickle and the other small vessels kept well back from the fighting, as a single broadside from a ship of the line would have sunk her instantly. Pickle herself was stationed to the north-west of the weather line, where Nelson was leading HMS Victory into battle. In the later stages of the battle, Pickle, Entreprenante, and the boats of Prince and Swiftsure went to the rescue of the crew of the French ship Achille, which had caught fire and subsequently exploded. Together the British vessels rescued two women and somewhere between 100 and 200 men (Note: Marshall reports some 100 were on Pickle alone.) French guns "cooking off" as they became heated killed two or three seamen in other boats.

One of the women was floating, completely naked, holding onto an oar; she was brought on board the schooner wearing a pair of seaman's trousers that a seaman on the boat that picked her up had taken off and given to her. Later she recounted how she had had to fight off a number of men who had tried to take her oar. The prisoners in Pickle outnumbered her crew three-to-one, and were heard plotting to take her over to take her into Cádiz. Pickle's crew kept a particularly sharp watch over the prisoners, and nothing happened.

Pickle was the first ship to bring the news of Nelson's victory at Trafalgar to Great Britain, arriving at Falmouth on 4 November 1805, after a hard voyage in bad weather. Vice Admiral Collingwood, who had assumed command after the death of Nelson, chose her to carry his dispatches describing the battle and announcing Nelson's death. Collingwood sent Pickle, captained by Lapenotière, back to Britain with the dispatches telling of the great victory. This was a signal honour for any junior officer, as it almost guaranteed promotion. After arriving in Falmouth, Lapenotière took a post chaise to London to deliver the dispatches to the Admiralty, stopping 21 times to change horses. The Admiralty duly promoted him to Commander for this service, and the Committee of the Lloyd's Patriotic Fund gave him a sword worth 100 guineas and £500 in cash. The route that Lapenotière travelled is now known as The Trafalgar Way.

=== Favorite ===
In 1806 Lieutenant Daniel Callaway took command of Pickle, sailing her in the Channel. On 15 April 1806, Pickle, with two Scilly pilot boats in company, captured the Prussian ship Elizabeth Henrietta.

On 3 January 1807 Scorpion was chasing a cutter some 15 miles south of The Lizard. Pickle came on the scene, made all sail, and succeeded in catching up with the quarry, with whom she exchanged two broadsides. Callaway ran Pickle alongside the French vessel, and his crew boarded and captured her. The French vessel was the privateer Favorite, of 14 guns and 70 men under the command of M. E. J. Boutruche. She was only two months old and had left Cherbourg two days before.

Out of her crew of 70 men, Favorite had lost one man killed and two wounded. Pickle had suffered two men severely and one man slightly wounded. When Scorpion caught up, she took off 69 prisoners who she then landed at Falmouth. Later that year Lieutenant Moses Cannadey was appointed to replace Callaway. However, Cannadey did not actually take command until later in 1807. In 1847 the Admiralty authorised the issue to all remaining survivors of the Naval General Service Medal with the clasp "Pickle 3 Jany. 1807".

== Fate ==
On 26 July 1808, Pickle was carrying dispatches from England for Admiral Lord Collingwood at Cádiz when Cannadey sighted Cape Santa Maria in the evening. He then set his course on that basis. At midnight the lookouts sighted broken water. The helmsman immediately tried to turn her, but it was too late and she grounded. Pickle started filling rapidly with water, which caused her to heel to port. The crew took to the boats and landed on the Spanish shore. In the morning, Cannadey returned to the wreck where he found her unsalvageable as her bottom was completely caved in He determined that she had wrecked on the Chipiona shoal near Cádiz. A Maltese diver worked for three days to recover the dispatches.

The court martial on 2 August, attributed the wrecking to "an unaccountable error in reckoning" the distance travelled, and reprimanded Cannadey, recommending that he be more careful in the future. Later that year Cannadey took command of the hired armed lugger Black Joke.

== Postscript ==
- Following a 1974 initiative by Commodore (later Vice-Admiral) Sir John Lea, the Royal Navy's petty officers have an annual Pickle Night dinner, as do many private clubs in the Commonwealth of Nations. Pickle Night parallels Trafalgar Night, the commemoration of the battle by the Royal Navy's commissioned officers, but is usually held a week later.
- The historic 1805 journey was commemorated in 2005, the bicentenary of the Battle of Trafalgar, by the New Trafalgar Dispatch and the Trafalgar Way.
- Five replica Baltic packet schooners known as Grumant 58 were built between 1992 and 1996 in the Varyag shipyard in St Petersburg. These schooners are based on a design by Swedish marine architect AF Chapman. One, named Alevtina & Tuy, was later renamed Pickle and took part as a representation of HMS Pickle in the anniversary celebrations of the Battle of Trafalgar in 2005. The vessel was offered for sale in 2008 for £350,000. In 2010 it featured as part of a BBC program about 'The Boats that Built Britain' (episode 2 of 6). The vessel is currently moored in Hull Marina, [East Yorkshire]. She is a close replica of HMS Pickle based on available knowledge.

== See also ==
- Bermuda sloop
- Dispatch boat
- HMS Whiting (1805)
