= Kilmington, Devon =

Village in Devon, England

Coordinates: 50.775995°N 3.031923°W

Kilmington
- Location within Devon
- Population: 925
- OS grid reference: SY272979
- Shire county: Devon
- Region: South West
- Country: England
- Sovereign state: United Kingdom
- Post town: Axminster
- Postcode district: EX13
- Dialling code: 01297
- Police: Devon and Cornwall
- Fire: Devon and Somerset
- Ambulance: South Western
- UK Parliament: Honiton and Sidmouth
- Website: https://www.kilmingtonvillage.com/

Kilmington is a village near Axminster in East Devon off the A35 road. The village population at the 2021 Census was 925. Kilmington is a major part of Newbridges electoral ward whose population at the above census was 2,358.

It includes Coryton, the grade II listed surviving wing of a brick house with Portland stone dressings built in 1754–1756 by Benedictus Marwood Tucker, sheriff of Devon in 1763. Some remains of the older mansion can also be seen at Old Coryton. This had been for many years the property of the Warren family, who sold it to William Tucker of Westwater in 1697. He built the old house, which passed to his son William, High Sheriff of Devon for 1726, who lived there until 1748. Benedictus, also the High Sheriff for 1763, was the latter's son.

The parish church of St. Giles was rebuilt in 1862, it contains a large marble monument to Thomas Southcott of Dulshayes that was erected in 1735. The church itself was built around the tower, an earlier structure featuring a six-bell peal and gargoyles. Kilmington also has a cricket ground.

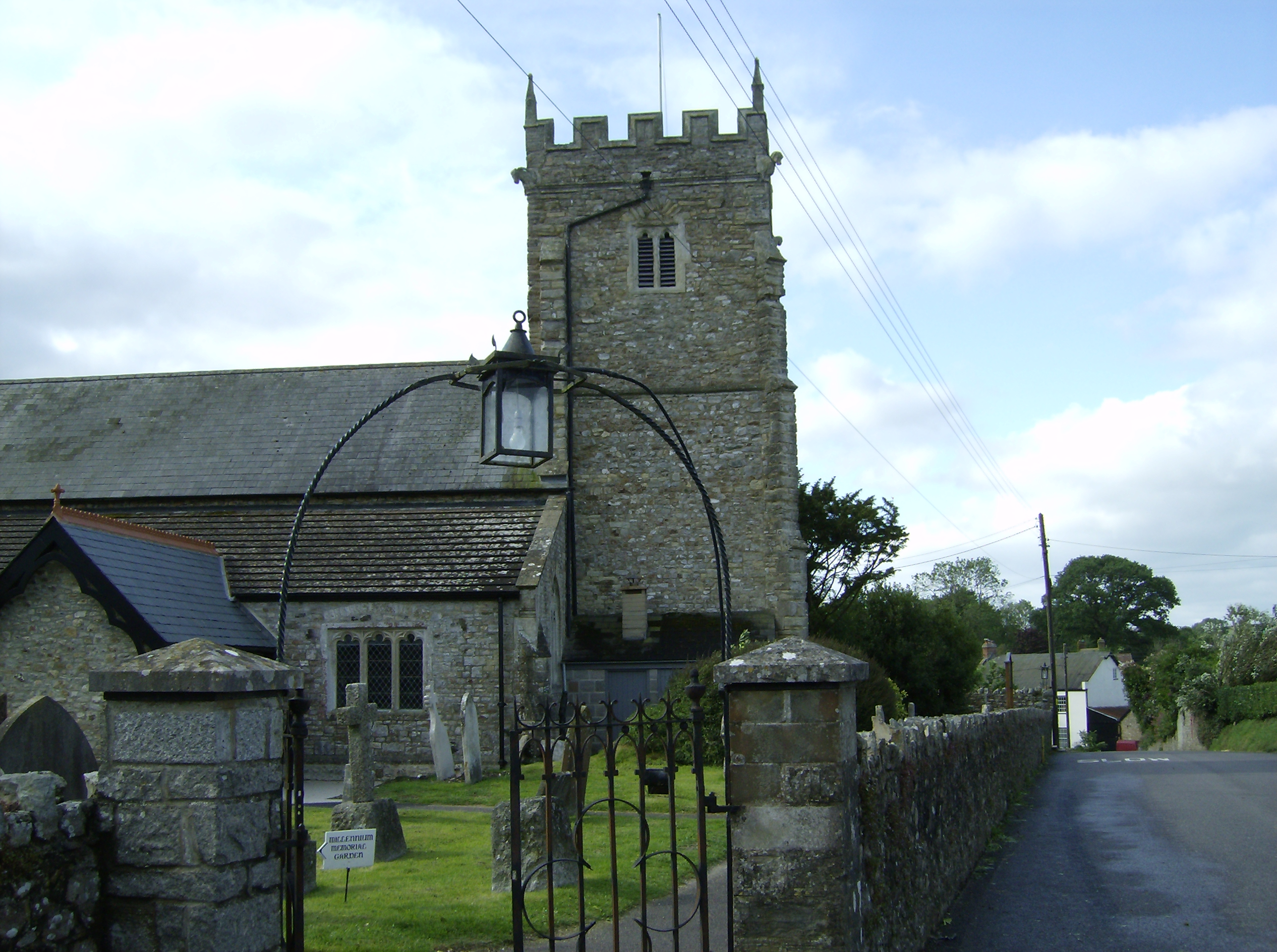
Kilmington Church
