= John Richards Lapenotière =

Royal Navy officer (1770–1834)

Captain John Richards Lapenotière
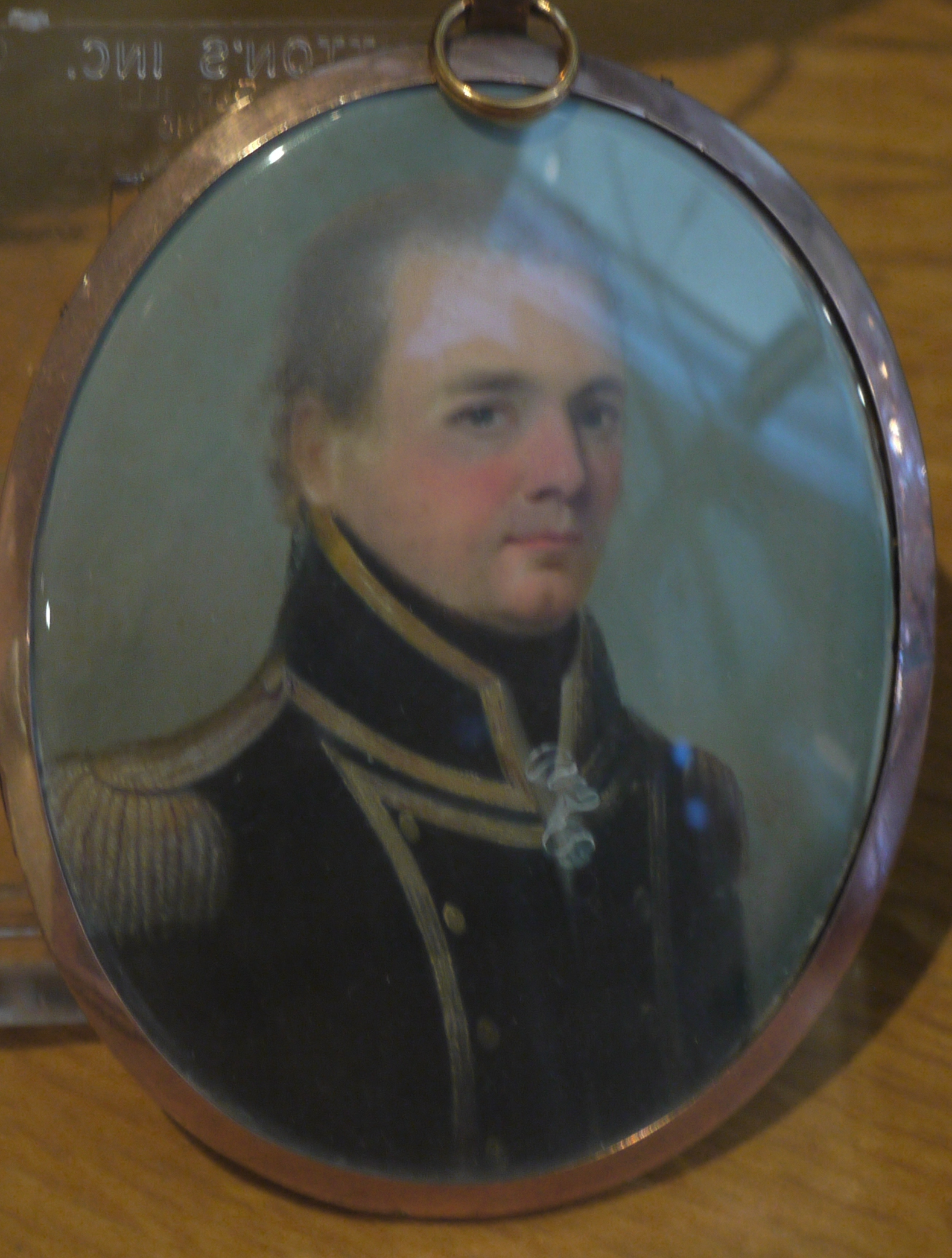
- Possible miniature portrait of Lapenotière
- Born: 1770; Ilfracombe, Devon
- Died: 19 January 1834 (aged 63–64); Roseland, Cornwall
- Military career
- Allegiance: Great Britain; United Kingdom
- Branch: Royal Navy
- Service years: 1780–1811
- Rank: Captain
- Conflicts: French Revolutionary Wars, Napoleonic Wars; Battle of Trafalgar; Battle of Copenhagen

Captain John Richards Lapenotière (1770 – 19 January 1834) was a Royal Navy officer who served in the French Revolutionary and Napoleonic Wars. As the captain of the schooner HMS Pickle, he observed the Battle of Trafalgar, participated in post-battle rescue operations and carried dispatches of the victory and Horatio Nelson's death to England.

== Early life ==
John Richards Lapenotière was born in 1770 in Ilfracombe, Devon into a Huguenot family which came to England in 1688 with William of Orange. Lapenotière came from a military family: his great grandfather, Frederick La Penotiere, was appointed Major in The Royal Regiment of Foot of Ireland.

== Service career ==
John followed his father, Frederick, into naval service, joining his father's ship unofficially, at just ten years old. At fifteen he enlisted with Nathaniel Portlock on a commercial expedition to what is now Alaska and the Canadian Pacific coast, where he learned the principles of seamanship in difficult climates and the handling of small ships, which was very advantageous to him, given that he spent most of his career in such craft. After a period of service as a midshipman in the Royal Navy, Lapenotière again took a leave of absence, to accompany Portlock and William Bligh on a breadfruit expedition to the South Pacific, to replace those plants lost following the Mutiny on the Bounty.

Returning in time for service in the French Revolutionary Wars, Lapenotière travelled to the West Indies in the fleet under John Jervis in HMS Margarita, being briefly appointed lieutenant into HMS Boyne before his superior knowledge of seamanship earned him a temporary independent command in the schooner HMS Berbice. In 1796 he was transferred into the frigate HMS Resource and from there into four other ships, each of them without event or action. By 1800, he had yet to spend a full year in any ship but was given the small cutter Joseph, as a reward for his patience. In Joseph he distinguished himself in small boat actions on the French coast prior to the Peace of Amiens. At the peace he found himself on the beach for the first long stretch of time since 1779. During this period ashore, he married Lucia Shean, with whom he had three daughters.

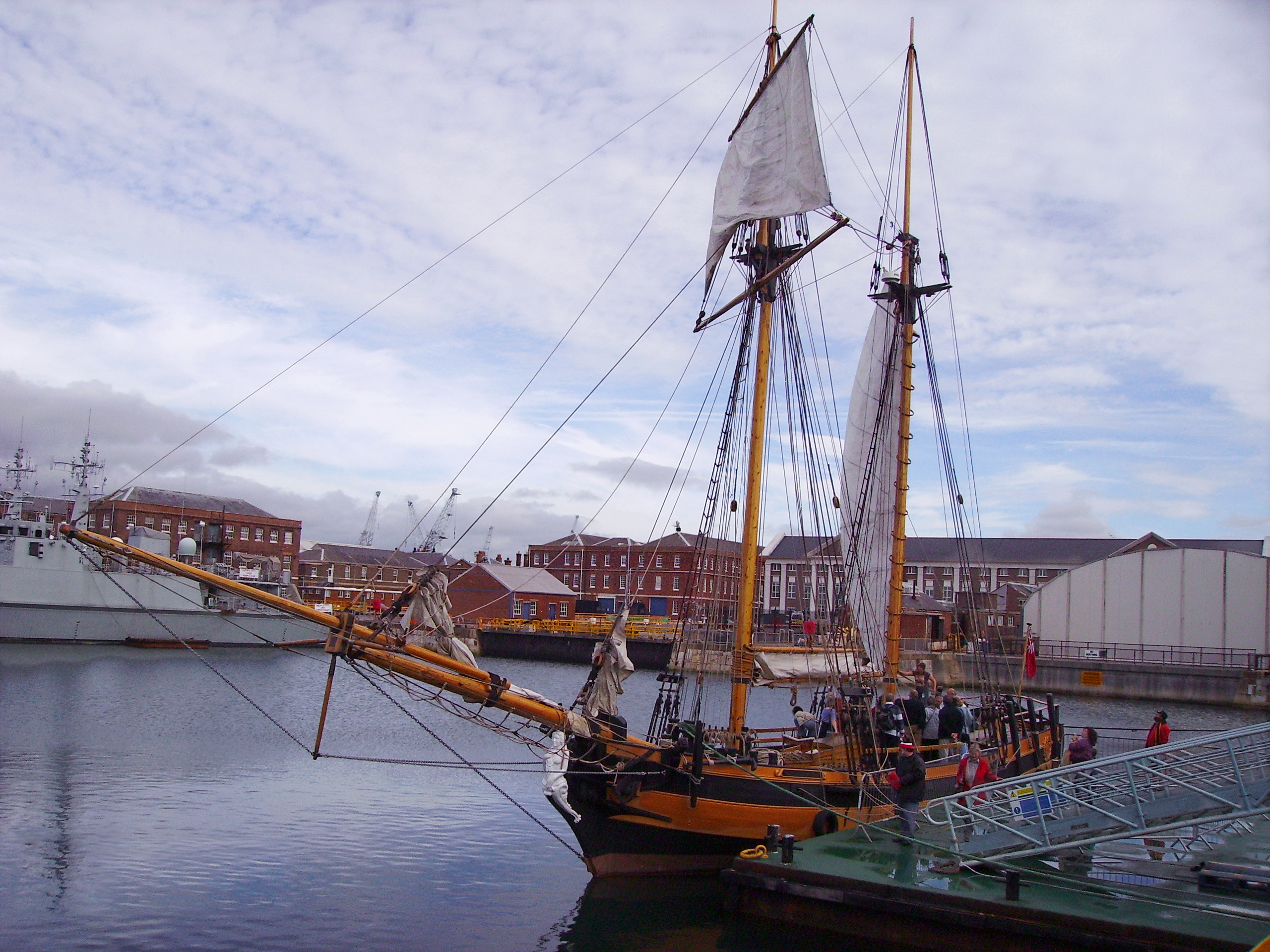
A replica of Pickle at Portsmouth in 2005

His efforts had not gone unnoticed, however and in 1802 he was given the 10 gun schooner HMS Pickle, in which he again cruised the French coast. He earned accolades in 1804 for saving the crew of the ship of the line HMS Magnificent, which was wrecked off Ushant. He was widowed during this period but soon remarried to Mary Anne Graves and had a further seven children, two of whom later became naval officers themselves. He was subsequently attached to Nelson's fleet blockading Cádiz, helping to feed the fleet by capturing Spanish and Portuguese livestock and grain transports.

=== Battle of Trafalgar ===
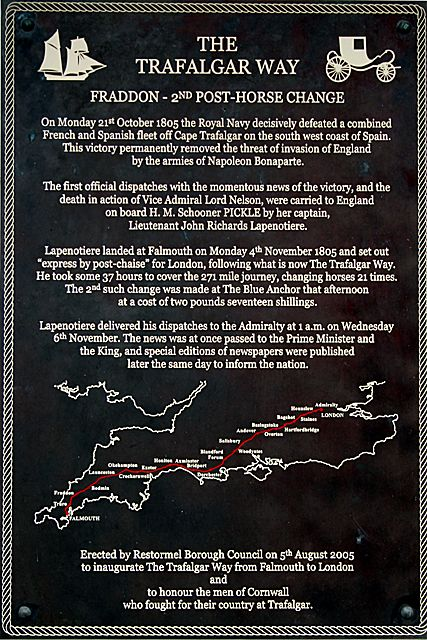
The Trafalgar Way – How Lapenotiere carried the news from Falmouth to London

Pickle was too small to serve an active role in the Battle of Trafalgar, which culminated the campaign on 21 October 1805 but her assistance was invaluable during the difficult and dangerous task which arose during the ensuing storm. Lapenotière's ship was engaged in rescuing survivors from the water, taking men off sinking ships over the next week and even towing damaged hulks in an effort to rescue them from the waves. On 26 October, Admiral Collingwood sent Pickle to Britain with the dispatches telling of the great victory. This was a signal honour for any junior officer, since it almost guaranteed promotion and fame and some of the other junior officers later expressed anger at the seeming preferment of Lapenotière.

Arriving in the English Channel on 1 November, Lapenotière realised that the wind was so strong it would prevent him from making landfall further up the Channel and so landed at Falmouth, Cornwall. He then took an exhausting series of mail coaches and horses overland to London, where he arrived on 6 November, after a journey of about 271 miles and involving 21 changes of horses taking 37 hours and costing £46 [each stage being between 10 and 15 miles at a speed of just over 7 mph], to give his dispatches to William Marsden, First Secretary to the Board of Admiralty, with the simple words, "Sir, we have gained a great victory. But we have lost Lord Nelson". (Note: In 1974, the Royal Navy commenced the tradition of annual Pickle Night dinners in which senior ratings mess to commemorate Lapenotière's return with the news of Trafalgar and Nelson.) As was expected, Lapenotière was greatly rewarded for his feat. Promoted to commander, he received a sword from the Lloyd's Patriotic Fund, £500 in cash and a silver spice sprinkler from George III, the last of which is now owned by the mayor's office in Liskeard. Lapenotière was subsequently given the command of the 16-gun Orestes and participated in the bombardment of Copenhagen in 1807, where he was badly wounded by an exploding gun.

His next four years of sea service was spent sailing the Orestes out of Plymouth. With Orestes he captured a French and an American privateer along with a valuable US merchantman. In 1811, Lapenotière was promoted to captain but was unable to secure command of a ship and spent the remainder of the war on shore duties. He never captained a ship again, settling in Menheniot, Cornwall with his family, dying peacefully in 1834. Lapenotière was buried next to his second wife in the churchyard at Menheniot.

== See also ==
- The Trafalgar Way
