= Thomas Grimshaw =

Thomas Grimshaw may refer to:

- Thomas Shuttleworth Grimshawe (1778–1850), English biographer and Anglican priest
- Thomas Wrigley Grimshaw (1839–1900), Irish physician, surgeon and statistician

== See also ==
- Grimshaw (disambiguation)
