= Grim's Ditch =

Name shared by a number of prehistoric bank and ditch earthworks

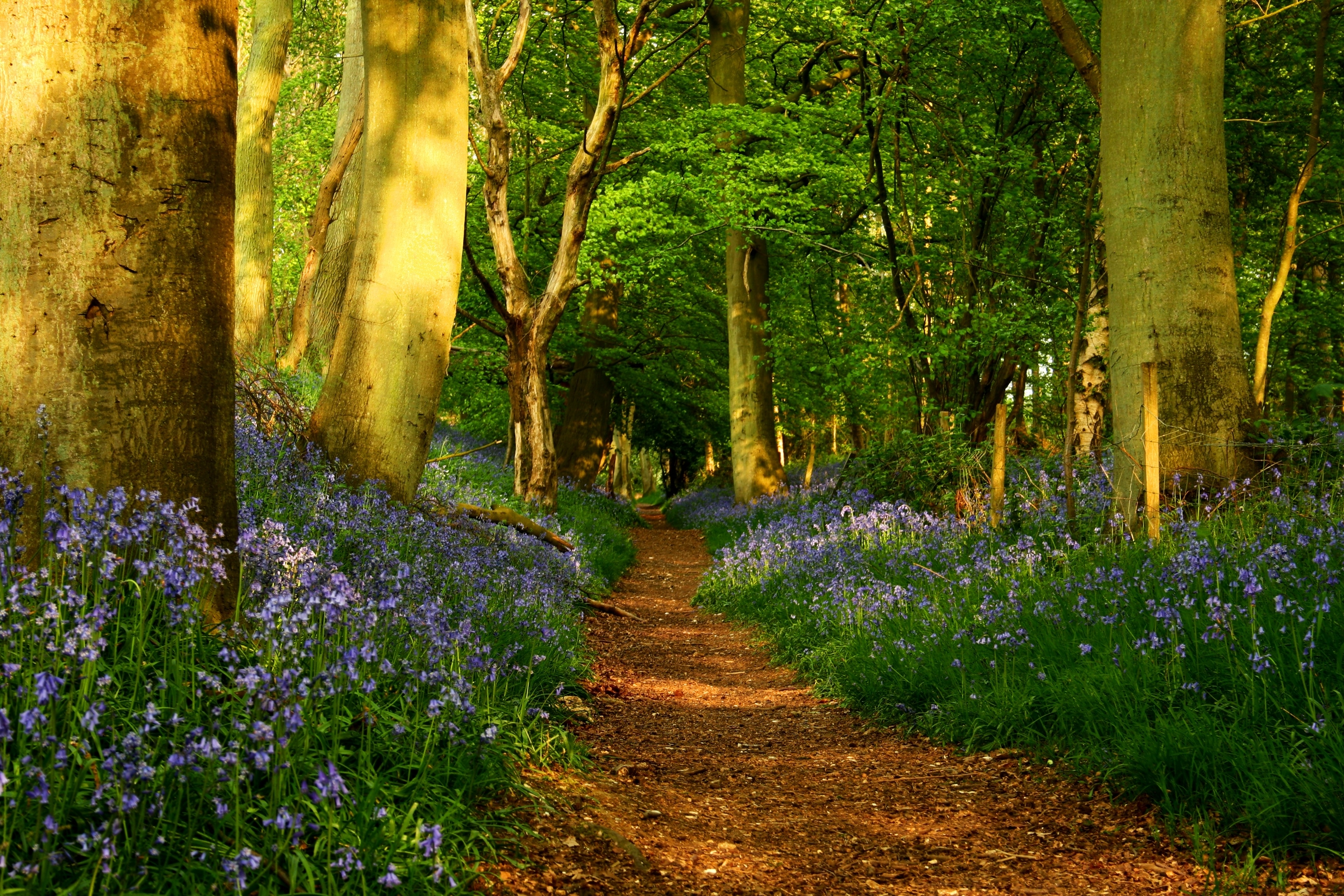
Grim's Ditch with bluebells, near Mongewell in Oxfordshire

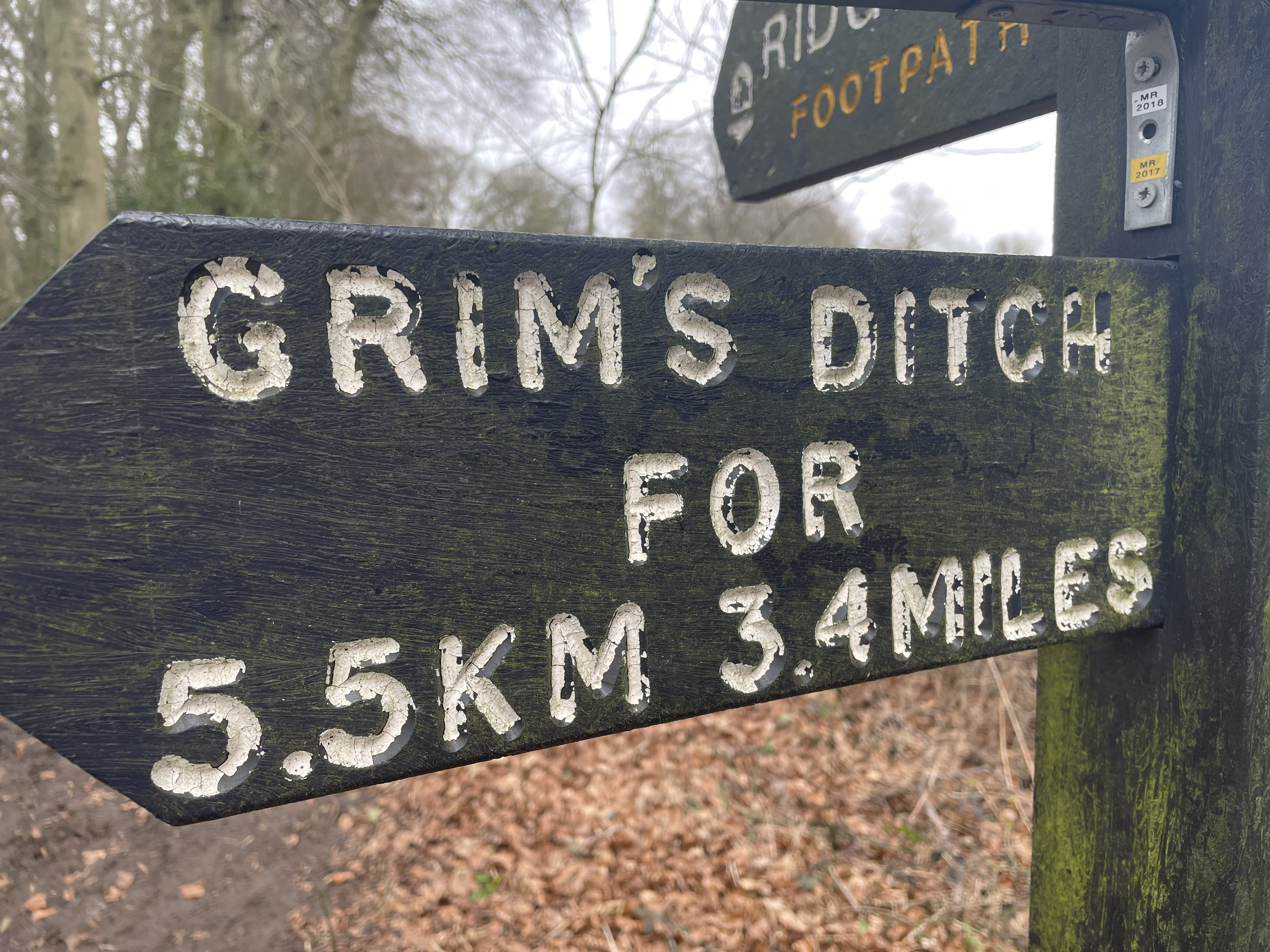
Grim's Ditch footpath sign near Nuffield Church, Nuffield, Oxfordshire

Grim's Ditch, Grim's Dyke (also Grimsdyke or Grimes Dike in derivative names) or Grim's Bank is a name shared by a number of prehistoric bank and ditch linear earthworks across England. They are of different dates and may have had different functions.

== Purpose ==
The purpose of these earthworks remains a mystery, but as they are too small for military use they may have served to demarcate territory. Some of the Grims Ditches may have had multiple functions.

== Etymology ==
The name "Grim's Ditch" is Old English in origin. The Anglo-Saxon word dīc was pronounced "deek" in northern England and "deetch" (dīċ) in the south. The method of building this type of earthwork involved digging a trench and forming the upcast soil into a bank alongside it. This practice has resulted in the name dīc being given to either the trench or the bank, and this evolved into two words, ditch and dyke, in modern British English.

The origin of the name Grim is shrouded in mystery, but there are several theories as to its origin. Many ancient earthworks of this name exist across England and Wales, pre-dating the Anglo Saxon settlement of Britain. It was common for the Anglo Saxons to name features of unexplained or mysterious origin Grim.

=== Danish Vikings ===
The name Grim was a common Old Danish personal-name during the Viking Age. Many English placenames are derived from the name, especially in those areas where people of Scandinavian origin settled. (Note: The Danes of Viking origin settled in the north and east of England in an area that became known as the Danelaw.) (Note: Examples of Grim place names: Grimsby, Lincolnshire; Grimsthorpe, Lincolnshire; Grimethorpe, Barnsley, South Yorkshire.; Grimesthorpe, Sheffield, South Yorkshire.; Grimshaw, Eccleshill, Lancashire.) The placename Grimston is particularly common. (Note: GRIMSTON HYBRIDS. .'Grimston Hybrid' is a convenient term for place-names consisting of a Scandinavian personal-name compounded with Old English tun, (Note: WiKtionary : Old English < tun >: 1. " an enclosed piece of ground "; 2. " a village or town ") of which Grimston is particularly common. . . . . .)

The name was associated with the Norse god Óðinn, known as Wōden to the Anglo Saxons. (Note: WiKtionary : Old Norse < Grímr >: 1. " a male given name, especially one of Óðinn's name ".) (Note: See Anglo-Saxon paganism > Deities > . . .It has been suggested that Woden was also known as Grim . . .the place-name scholar Margaret Gelling cautioned against the view. . .) The name was also associated with the attribute of being fierce or "fierce faced". (Note: WiKtionary : Old Norse < Grímr > Probably derived from Old Norse gríma (“a kind of face mask”).) (Note: Old Norse < grimmr > ” fierce ”) (Note: WiKtionary : Old English < grimm >: 1. " fierce, savage, terrible, cruel, angry. ") The name may have been used as a metaphor for a person of Danish Viking origin, and hence the Devil. (Note: During the Viking Age England was ravaged for years by relentless Viking raids, there was an abundance of anti Danish sentiment that culminated in the St Brice's Day massacre.)

=== Association with Woden ===
The name of Wōden is thought by some historians to be evident in Wansdyke, an ancient earthwork of uncertain origin which runs from Wiltshire to Somerset. The historian W. H. Stevenson draws a link between Grim, the Saxon alias for Wōden, and the name of Grim's Dyke:

If there were any evidence that Wōden was also known among the pagan English as Grim, as he was among the Norsemen, we might conclude that "Grims-Dic" was merely the equivalent of "Wodnes-dic". The Devil's Dyke, occasionally met with as the name of ditches, may be compared.

— W. H. Stevenson, The English Historical Review

Frank Stenton notes that there is no direct evidence that Wōden was known in England as Grim, but (citing supporting claims by Professor Eilert Ekwall) states that it was very probable. He mentions three sites named Grimes Wrosen: one outside Colchester in Essex; another in Warwickshire on the route of the Roman road Watling Street; and Credenhill in Herefordshire. These earthworks, Stenton asserts, were either considered to have been the supernatural work of Wōden himself, or sites connected strongly with the cult of Wōden where the Anglo-Saxons worshipped the god. Among Woden's many roles is that of a god of war, and it may be that the Anglo-Saxons perceived the earthworks as military in function and therefore ascribed them to him.

Another suggested origin of Grim may be in the Celtic name Grin or Gryn (Gryan in Irish, a putative origin of the name Ryan), a signifier of the Sun as a divinity.

=== Association with the Devil ===
The identities of Wōden and the Devil have also become conflated, as evidenced in the number of earthworks named after the Devil. As the Anglo-Saxon population converted to the new religion of Christianity, baptised converts renounced the old Saxon Gods along with the works of the Devil. It is thought that, as a result of this Christianisation, place names and features once associated with pre-Christian deities then came to be associated with the Devil. The names Grim, Graeme and Graham are closely connected and many British family and place names have been linked with the etymology of Wōden/Grim/Devil: Grimsby (residence of the Devil), Grimsthorpe (village of the Devil), Grimshaw (the Devil's wood), reflected in the use of dragon emblems in heraldry associated with Grim- names. Earthworks bearing names related to Grim or the Devil proliferate around Britain: Grim's Ditches exist in Berkshire, Buckinghamshire, Hampshire, Hertfordshire, Oxfordshire and West Yorkshire, and Devil's Dykes exist in Sussex, Cambridgeshire, Norfolk (near Weeting) and Hertfordshire. The Antonine Wall which once separated Scotland from Roman Britain is also sometimes known as Graham's Dyke. In Suffolk, a large Neolithic flint mine is known as Grime's Graves.

Beyond Britain, a set of Roman Limes on the borders of Hungary, Romania and Serbia are sometimes known as the Devil's Dykes in Hungarian.

== Berkshire ==
Grim's Bank in West Berkshire runs for 2.8 miles (5 km) from inside the Atomic Weapons Establishment in Aldermaston, through Ufton Park woods to Ufton Nervet village. At Park Piece there are a number of earthworks, and Grim's Bank changes direction or may be a separate monument. Excavations in 1978 suggested there were two different earthworks which were most likely to be Iron Age in date. These two parts of Grim's Bank are referred to as Grim's Bank I and Grim's Bank II.

There is another Grim's Bank running south of Aldworth and Streatley. Excavations have shown that the ditch is not earlier than the third century AD.

== Buckinghamshire ==
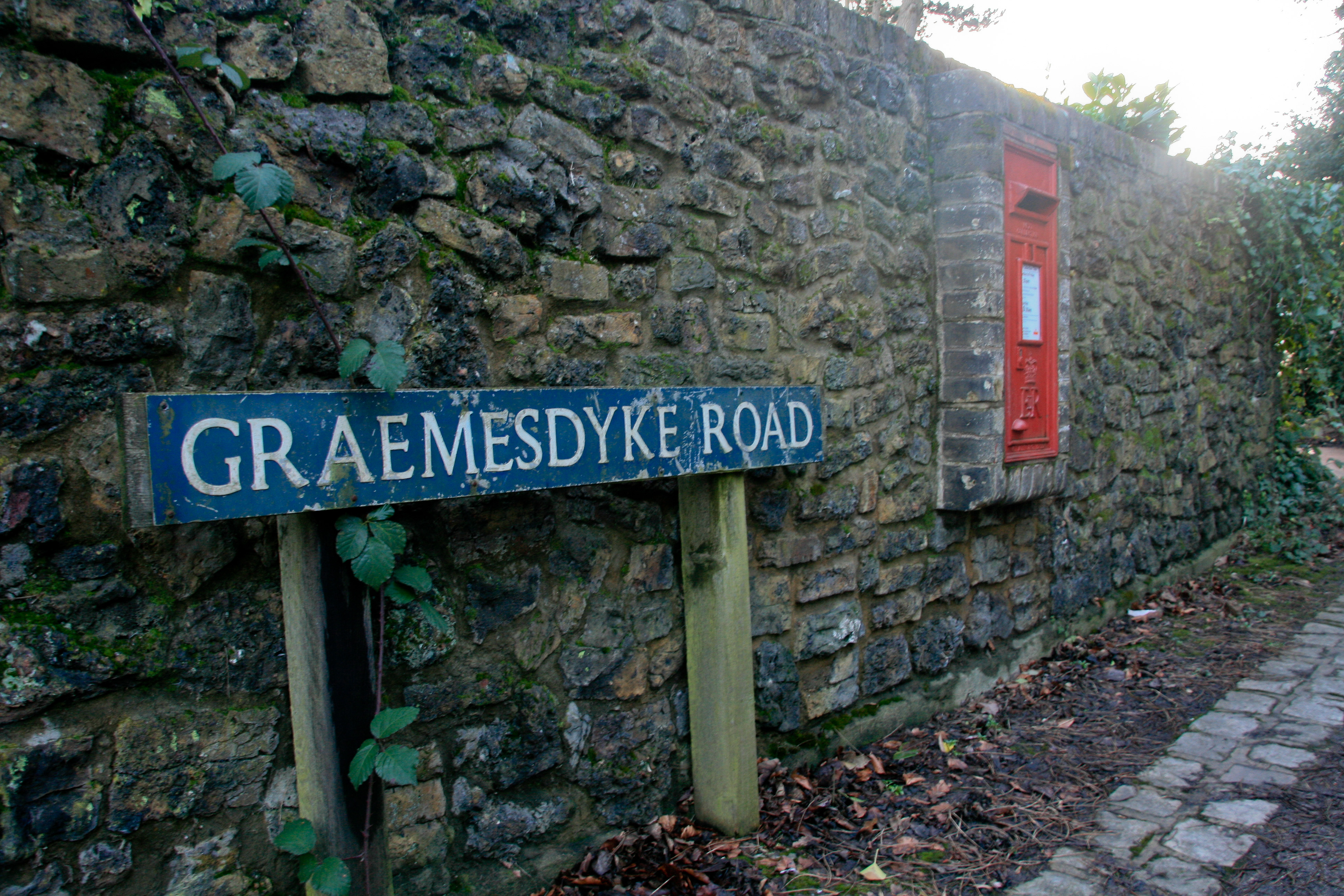
Graemesdyke Road, Berkhamsted

There are three sections of the Chiltern Grim's Ditch in Buckinghamshire:

- A substantial section from Park Wood to Hampden House
- Missenden Valley to the Lea
- From King's Ash to the county boundary where it continues into Hertfordshire

It is not known if these sections of ditch were once a continuous feature or were built at separate times and had different functions. These sections are most likely to be of Iron Age date.

== Essex ==
Gryme's Dyke, a scheduled ancient monument, is one of a number of large linear earthwork dykes around the oppidum at Colchester. Most of the dykes were built in the late Iron Age to define and protect the important settlement centre of Camulodunum (Colchester), though some can be dated to the early Roman period which is probably when Gryme's Dyke was constructed. The scheduling citation reads:

"The monument includes the buried and upstanding remains of the middle part of a late Iron Age or Romano-British linear boundary earthwork (Gryme's Dyke) located some 3.5km WSW of Colchester town centre."

"Fragments of pottery and a copied coin of the Emperor Claudius allow the bank to be tentatively dated to the period AD 40–75, perhaps constructed on the eve of the Roman conquest (AD 43), but more probably later and possibly as late as the aftermath of the Boudican revolt (AD 60–61)."

== Greater London ==
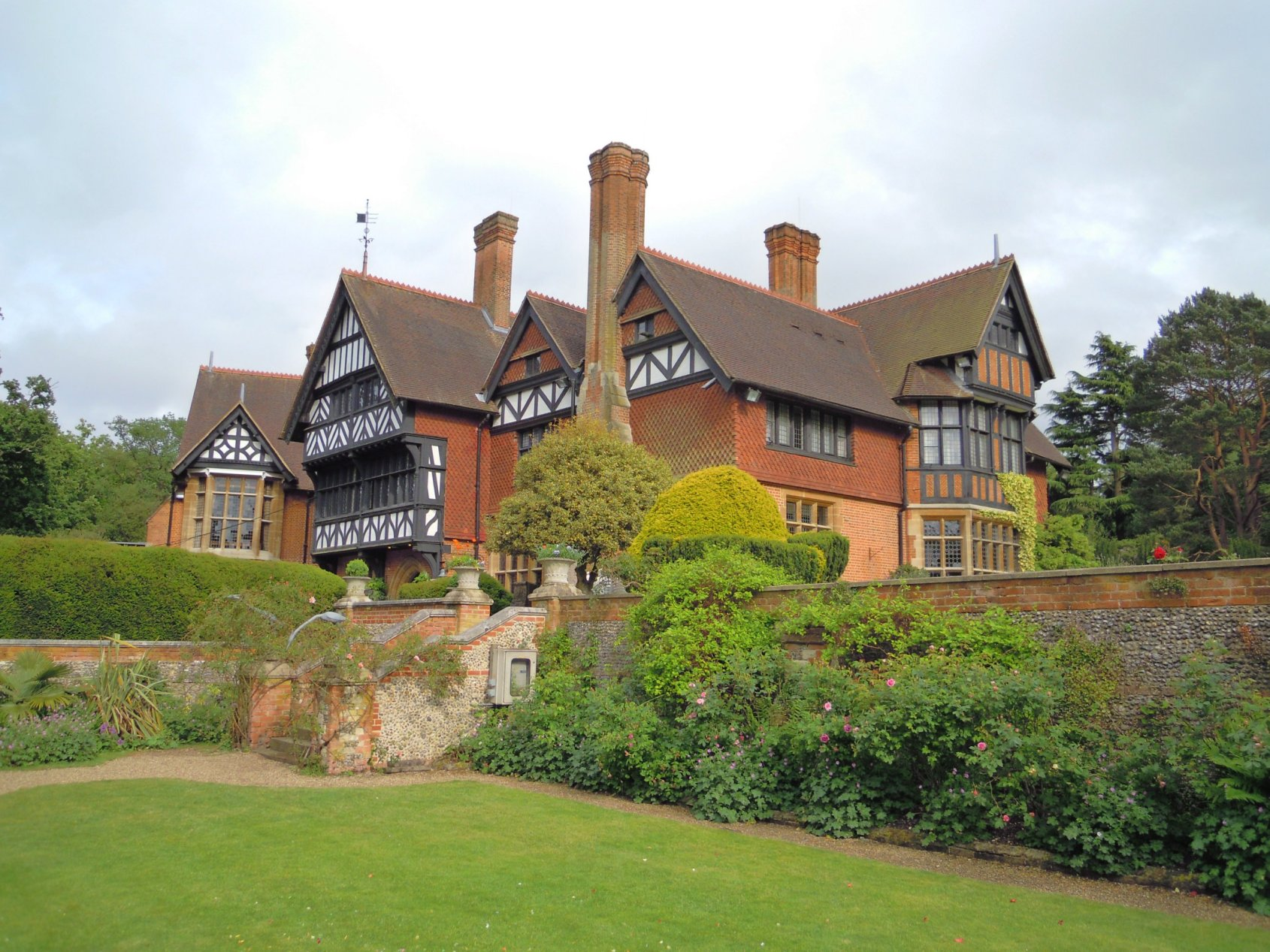
The Grim's Dyke Hotel near Harrow

Grim's Ditch, also called Grim's Dyke, stretches from Harrow Weald to Bushey Heath on the northwestern edge of Greater London. It extends for some 3 km but has been badly damaged by housing development in the twentieth century. The earthwork runs just south of the former county boundary between Hertfordshire and Middlesex. There is another earthwork close by in Pear Wood, Brockley Hill that has been suggested as an eastern continuation of the Grim's Dyke. This monument is of Roman or post-Roman date and runs at ninety degrees to Watling Street.

A nearby house built in 1870–72, Grim's Dyke (sometimes also called Graeme's Dyke), was named after the earthworks. The large Victorian Gothic mansion was once the home of the opera librettist W. S. Gilbert and is now operated as a hotel. Excavations in the grounds of the Grim's Dyke Hotel in 1979 suggested Grim's Dyke was earlier in date than the Pear Wood monument.

== Hampshire ==
One Hampshire ditch encloses an area of 16 square miles (41 km^{2}) on the Wiltshire and Dorset borders. The earthwork runs for about 14 miles (23 km), and is a double-banked structure with a ditch between the banks. It crosses the present county boundary into Wiltshire. The Royal Commission's survey of Bokerley Dyke disputed the idea of Grim's Ditch being a single monument, and suggested it was a complex of separate sections. English Heritage's monument scheduling suggests that Grim's Ditch may be of Bronze Age or Early Iron Age date.

Another can be found in west Hampshire, midway between the villages of Upton and Netherton.

== Hertfordshire ==
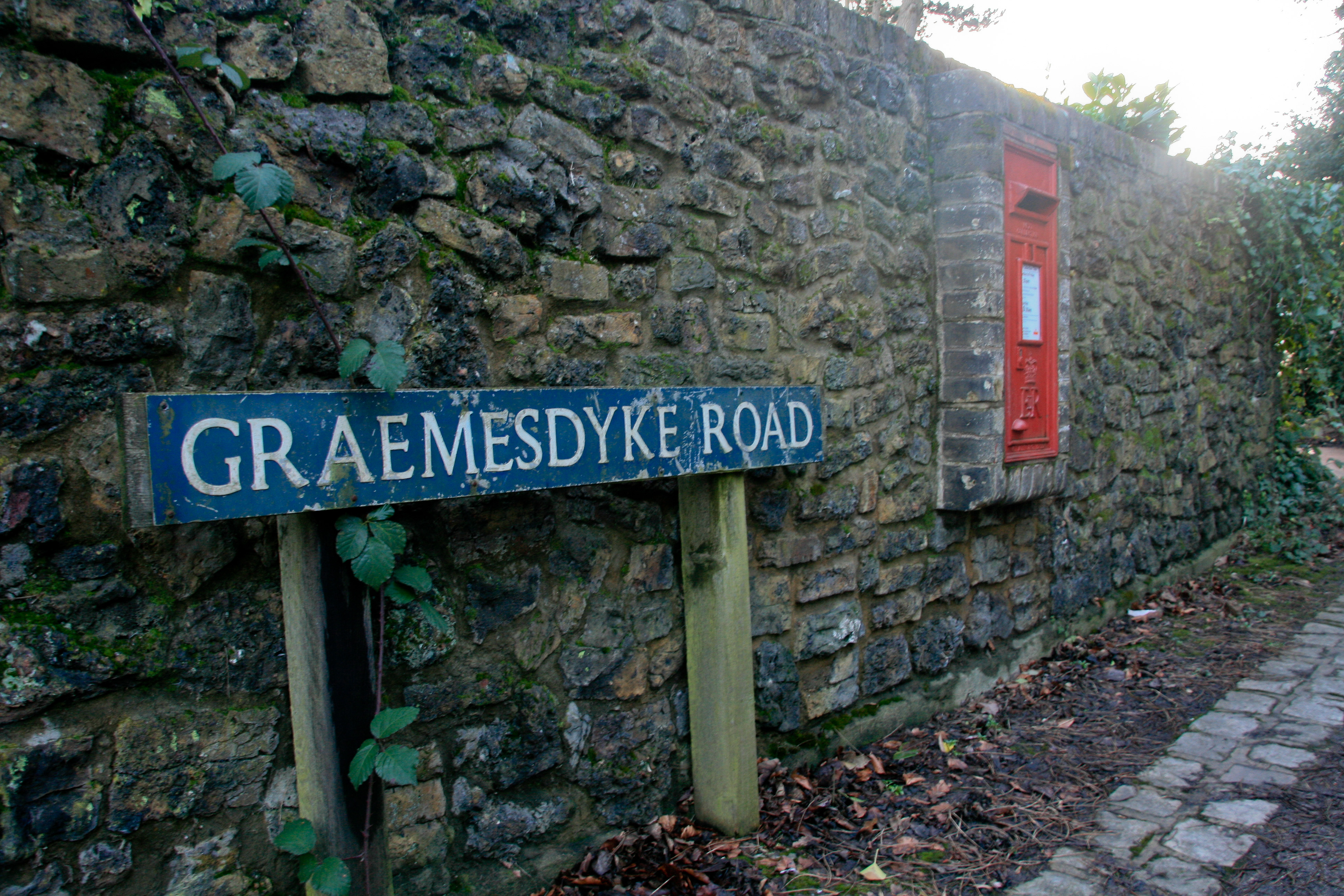
Graemesdyke Road, Berkhamsted

The route of the Grim's Ditch in Hertfordshire passes through the town of Berkhamsted, and remnants of the earthwork can be seen on Berkhamsted Common. The Historic Environment Record for Hertfordshire suggests that the section on Berkhamsted Common is of Iron Age or early Roman date, rather than the late Bronze Age date suggested for the rest of Grim's Ditch, because it is larger here and does not follow the contours of the landscape.

== Oxfordshire ==
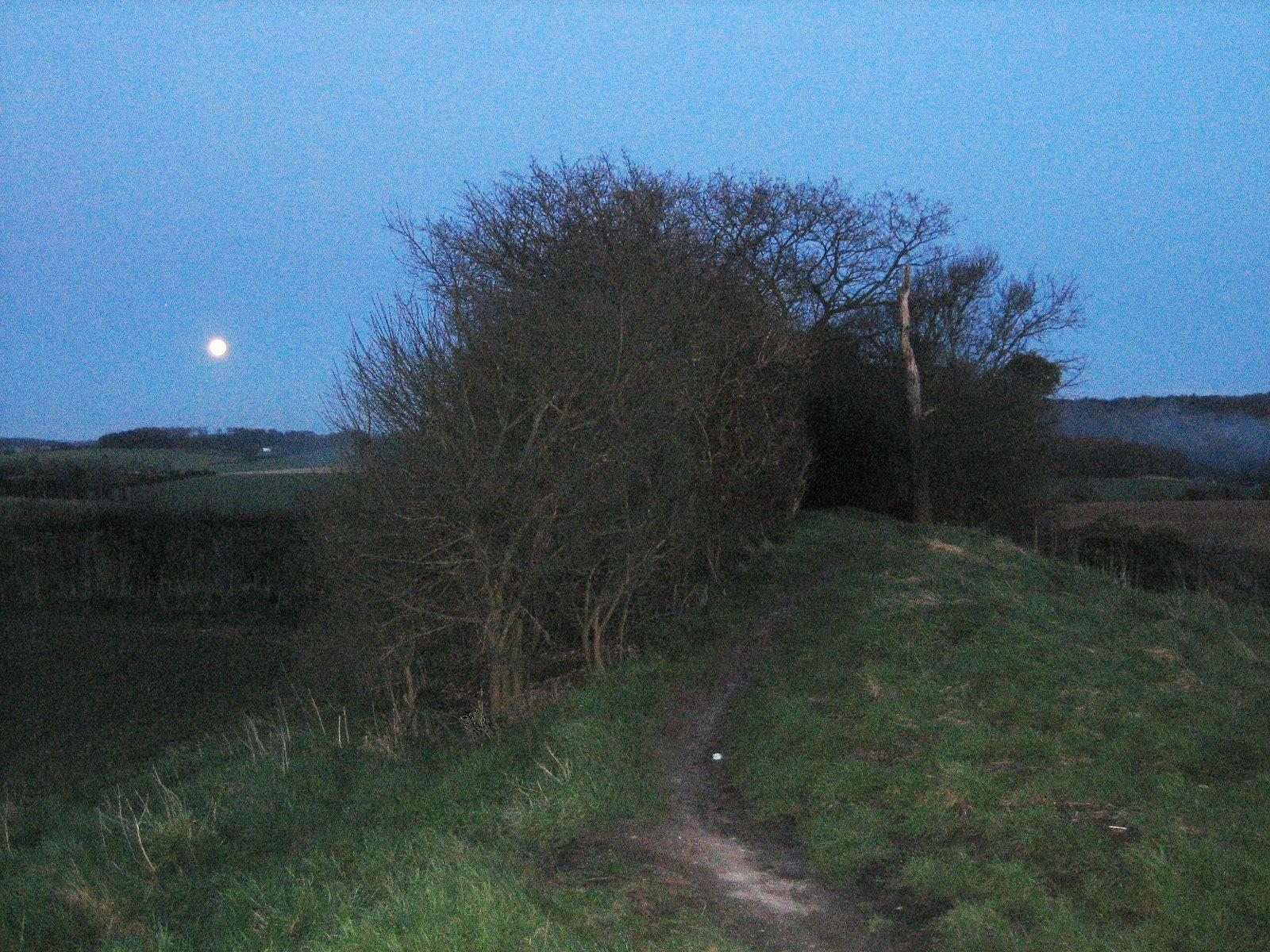
Grim's Ditch near Hailey, West Oxfordshire

There are three linear earthworks in Oxfordshire that are called Grim's Ditch.

=== South Oxfordshire ===
The south Oxfordshire Grim's Ditch, also known as the Mongewell Ditch, is a 5-mile (8 km) section between Mongewell on the banks of the Thames near Wallingford, and Hayden Farm near Nettlebed in the Chilterns escarpment. Part of the western end was excavated during the building of Winterbrook Bridge, and dated as late Iron Age/early Roman. The ditch has a bank on the north side which suggests that its function was to bar passage into the southernmost part of Oxfordshire.

Considering the location of the ditch across the Chiltern Clayland, it is possible that the ditch could have functioned to block movement into Oxfordshire up the Thames valley. The heavier soils behind the ditch are far easier to move over, creating a solid defensive position. However, since a neighbouring set of earthworks called Streatly Ditches faces north, it would be difficult to come to the conclusion that the two create a barrier against movement up the Thames valley. Furthermore, it could be argued that there is a possibility that people could simply cross the river at Streatley and avoid both dykes.

In terms of dating, one of the few finds on the site is a coin, dateable to the beginning of the 1st century BC. The ditch can also be compared to the identically arranged Chichester Entrenchments, dating the ditch to around the Iron Age. The soil composition shows light soils being cleared for tillage and sheep, and clays bearing forest for raising animals, which is also characteristic of the Iron Age.

=== North Oxfordshire ===
There is another separate set of earthworks known as the north Oxfordshire Grim's Ditch to the northwest of Oxford; a series of discontinuous earthworks with gaps between them. The whole complex covers an area of around 80 km^{2}. There are two circuits of earthworks whose relationship is unknown. Excavation has shown the earthworks were built in the late Iron Age and went out of use by the Roman period. There is a suggestion that the earthworks are part of an oppidum but if this is the case it would be the largest one in Britain.

The north Oxfordshire Grim's Ditch is visible as a shallow ditch and a raised area south of North Leigh (accessible from the New Yatt footpath), in the woods west of Stonesfield (near the Blenheim Park boundary wall), running north near Grim's Dyke Farm at Glympton Assets, in the woods to the north of Glympton Assets and south-east of Ditchley Park.

=== The Ridgeway ===
A third Grim's Ditch is found on the Berkshire Downs and lies north of the county boundary between Oxfordshire and West Berkshire, running for 5 miles (8 km) near the Ridgeway, above the Oxfordshire villages of Ardington, Hendred and Chilton. This is thought to be of late Bronze Age date.

== West Yorkshire ==
The West Yorkshire Grim's Ditch was recognised in the 1970s through the work of Dr Margaret Faull on the place names of West Yorkshire. It had escaped the attention of Yorkshire antiquarians because of the poor state of preservation. The Grim's Ditch runs north to south between Leeds and Castleford with the ditch on the eastern side. Late medieval documents only refer to the northern section as Grim's Ditch. The earthwork took substantial effort to build as the ditch was cut into the shale bedrock in parts. Radiocarbon dates from material excavated during archaeological work on the A1 (M) upgrading showed the Grim's Ditch was probably Iron Age in date with possible Roman reuse. A length of the ditch at Brown Moor east of Leeds is preserved underground and is a scheduled monument.

== Locations ==
Ancient earthworks in England associated with Grim and the Devil

Sites named after Grim

Sites named after the Devil

=== British National Grid references ===
Western end	Eastern end	
SU366566	SU378565	West Hampshire
SU042192	SU133210	Bokerley Dyke, Martin, Hampshire
SU007205	SU145234	Grim's Ditch, Dorset and Hampshire
SP359184	SP426183	North Oxfordshire
SU608882	SU673872	South Oxfordshire
SU4284	SU6487	Ridgeway
SU834977	TL025085	Chilterns
TQ114904	TQ141929	Harrow

== See also ==
- Anglo-Saxon paganism
- Devil's Dyke, Cambridgeshire, an earthen barrier in eastern Cambridgeshire
- Devil's Dyke, Hertfordshire, a prehistoric defensive ditch in Hertfordshire
- Toponymy of England
