= Martin, Hampshire =

Village and parish in Hampshire, England

Coordinates: 50.9759°N 1.9041°W

Martin
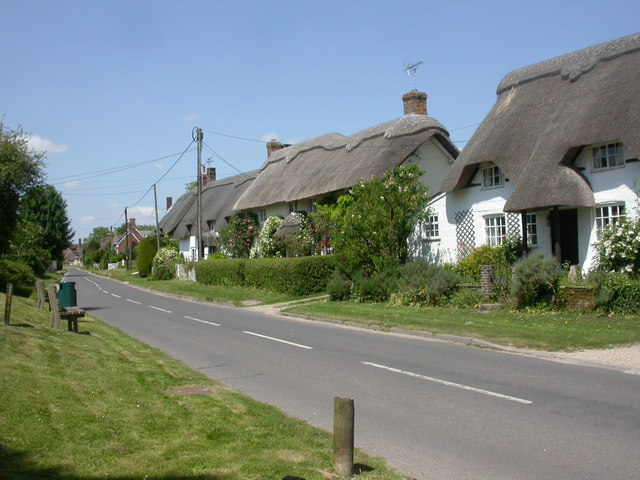

- Location within Hampshire
- Population: 412 (2021 census)
- OS grid reference: SU068196
- Civil parish: Martin
- District: New Forest
- Shire county: Hampshire
- Region: South East
- Country: England
- Sovereign state: United Kingdom
- Post town: Fordingbridge
- Postcode district: SP6
- Dialling code: 01725
- Police: Hampshire and Isle of Wight
- Fire: Hampshire and Isle of Wight
- Ambulance: South Central
- UK Parliament: New Forest West
- Website: Parish Council

Martin is a village and civil parish in the New Forest district of Hampshire, England. The nearest town, Fordingbridge, is 7 miles (11 km) to the south-east, and the cathedral city of Salisbury is 12 miles (19 km) to the north-east.

Martin straddles the Allen River (a tributary of the Avon) and forms the most western projection of Hampshire. The village street runs north-west to south-east through the parish. The hamlets of East Martin and Tidpit are close by. The parish was part of Wiltshire until 1895. The main Dorchester to Salisbury road (the A354) passes about 0.5 miles (0.80 km) west of the village.

The church of All Saints at Martin dates from Norman times although much of its fabric is 14th-century. Of note are its Elizabethan chalice, a paten dated 1743 and an 18th-century baluster font. The majority of the stained glass dates from 1880, with the glass in the north transept added about 15 years later.

The village green has an old village pump over a well, an iron frame impaled by a cranked spindle. The base of the 15th-century village cross can also be seen here.

The chalk grasslands of Martin Down are a national nature reserve.

In 1983 the village was used as one of the scenes for the Doctor Who episode The Awakening; the other being Shapwick, Dorset.

== History ==
Martin is surrounded by prehistoric sites, including Bokerley Dyke, and the very long Grim's Ditch which extends into Dorset and Wiltshire. Knap Barrow is 95 metres long and is the longest barrow in Hampshire.

The name Martin probably derives from Old English maere meaning "boundary" or mere meaning "pond", and tun meaning "farm". Martin is first documented around 945 when land at Martin formed part of a grant by Edmund I to Æthelflæd. At the time of the Domesday Book of 1086 it was included in the manor of Damerham, and subsequently descended with that manor. In 1266 Henry III granted to Glastonbury Abbey a weekly Wednesday market in their manor of Martin, and a fair on the eve, day and morrow of the Feast of Saints Peter and Paul, and in 1332, Edward III granted a market on Fridays. In 1483 part of the Abbot of Glastonbury's manor of East Martin was granted to Richard III for the enlargement of his park of Blagdon, Dorset.

There was a manor of West Martin which may have originated as a grant of land from Damerham manor granted by Henry de Sully, Abbot of Glastonbury in the 12th century. It was annexed before 1400 by Robert Petevyn, and afterwards belonged to the estate of Little Damerham. The nearby manor of Tidpit was also held of Glastonbury Abbey in the 13th century, and subsequently became merged with that of Damerham.

== Demographics ==
Census population of Martin, Hampshire parish
Census	Population	Female	Male	Households	Source
2001	398	193	205	162	
2011	413	211	202	168	
2021	412	215	197	171	
