= Brown Moor =

Area of Leeds, England

Coordinates: 53.798°N 1.424°W

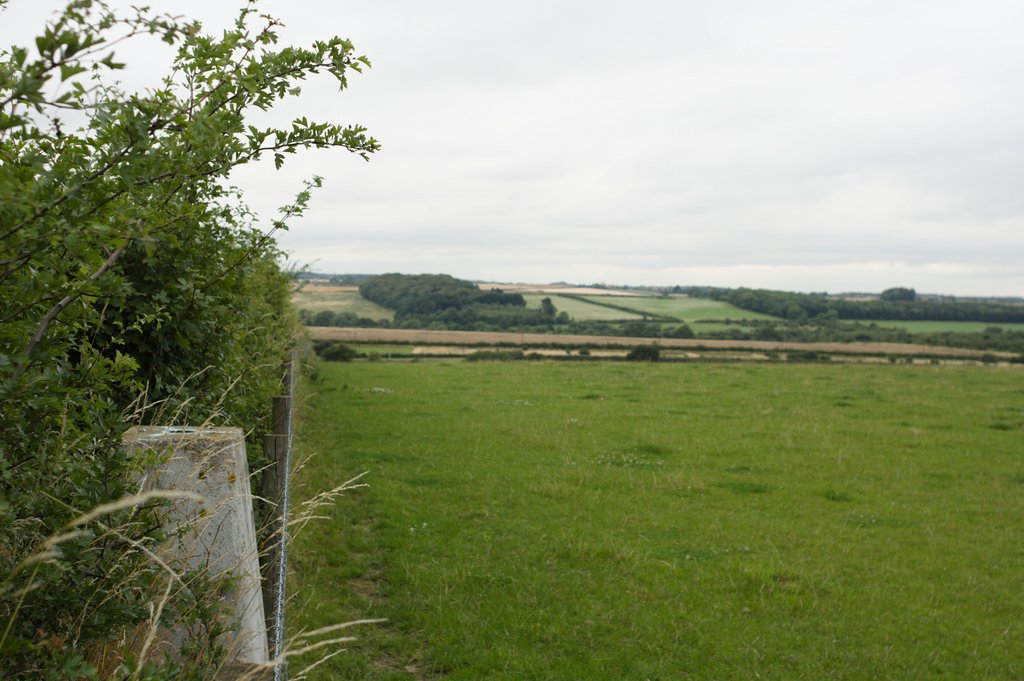
- Trig point on the eponymous hill

- Location within West Yorkshire
- OS grid reference: SE3833
- Metropolitan borough: City of Leeds
- Metropolitan county: West Yorkshire
- Region: Yorkshire and the Humber
- Country: England
- Sovereign state: United Kingdom
- Post town: LEEDS
- Postcode district: LS15
- Dialling code: 0113
- Police: West Yorkshire
- Fire: West Yorkshire
- Ambulance: Yorkshire
- UK Parliament: Leeds East

Brown Moor is an area in the metropolitan borough of the City of Leeds in West Yorkshire, England, east of Austhorpe and north of Colton. The M1 motorway and the A63 road pass it on its eastern flank and the A6120 road in the south. The area is named after a nearby hill. A colliery operated here in the 19th century and was accessed by a spur off the Leeds and Selby Railway, but was already disused in the early 20th century. At that time, some cottages had been erected nearby. Those had been sold by 2002 when Thorpe Park was established in the area.

A length of Grim's Ditch is preserved underground north of Barrowby Lane and to the west of the former farmstead and is a scheduled monument.
