= Leeds Outer Ring Road =

Main road around Leeds, West Yorkshire, England

Coordinates: 53.8429°N 1.5702°W

A6110

Major junctions
- From: Beeston
- To: Bramley

Location
- Country: United Kingdom
- Constituent country: England

Road network
- Roads in the United Kingdom; Motorways; A and B road zones

A6120

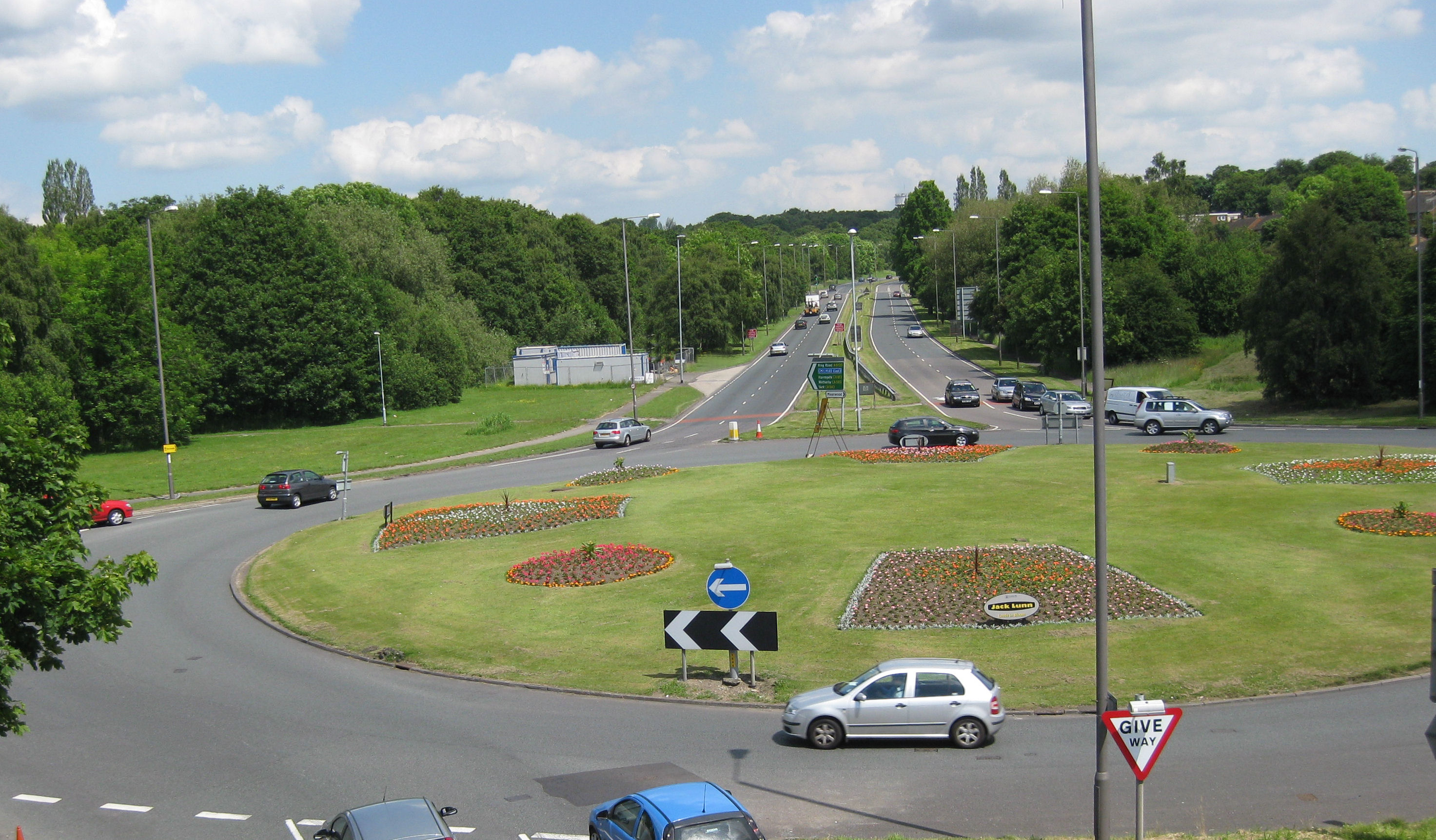
- Ring Road Moortown A6120

Major junctions
- From: Thorpe Park, Leeds
- To: Farsley

Location
- Country: United Kingdom
- Constituent country: England

Road network
- Roads in the United Kingdom; Motorways; A and B road zones

The Leeds Outer Ring Road is a main road that runs around most of the perimeter of the city of Leeds, West Yorkshire, England. The ring road is approximately 29 miles (45 km) and consists of single and dual carriageways. The road is not a loop and so is not a true ring road, although it is designated as such.

The road begins in Belle Isle and ends in Thorpe Park, Leeds at junction 46 of the M1 motorway. It begins in Belle Isle as an un-numbered road and goes through to Beeston. It is then designated the A6110 between Beeston and Bramley, a dual carriageway, before running concurrently with the Stanningley By-Pass A647, also a dual carriageway but with grade separated junctions. For the rest of the way between Farsley and Thorpe Park the road is the A6120 and it is a mixture of single and dual carriageway.

== Ring Road names ==
The road name of the ring road reflects the district it passes through. The table below states the name of the ring road and the number of carriageways in each district.

Road Number	Road Name	Dual or Single Carriageway	Intersection with
Unclassified	Ring Road Middleton	Single	
Unclassified	Middleton Park Road	Single (short dual section)	
Unclassified	Ring Road Beeston Park	Single	A653
A6110	Ring Road Beeston	Dual/Single	A643, M621 Junction 1, A62
A6110	Ring Road Lower Wortley	Dual	A58
A6110	Ring Road Farnley	Dual	
A6110	Ring Road Bramley	Dual	B6154
A647	Stanningley By Pass	Dual	A6110
A6120	Ring Road Farsley	Single	A647, B6157, B6156
A6120	Horsforth New Road	Single	A657
A6120	Broadway	Single	A65
A6120	Ring Road Horsforth	Single	
A6120	Ring Road West Park	Dual	A660
A6120	Ring Road Weetwood	Dual	
A6120	Ring Road Adel	Dual	
A6120	Ring Road Meanwood	Dual	
A6120	Ring Road Moortown	Dual	A61
A6120	Ring Road Shadwell	Single	A58
A6120	(ELOR) Ring Road Red Hall	Dual	A58
A6120	(ELOR) Ring Road Whinmoor Fields	Dual	
A6120	(ELOR) Ring Road Whinmoor	Dual	A64
A6120	(ELOR) Ring Road Morwick Green	Dual	
A6120	(ELOR) Ring Road Barnbow	Dual	
A6120	William Parkin Way	Dual	A63, M1 motorway (Junction 46).

As A6110

- A643 road Ring Road Beeston / Elland Road There is a brief concurrency where the A6110 and A643 run together as 40mph dual carriageway for about 1/2 mile.

As Old Ring Road (B6902)

- A64 road and Old Ring Road Seacroft There was a brief concurrency where the old A6120 (now just A64) and A64 used to run together as 70mph dual carriageway for about a half mile.
- A63 road Selby Road The then former A63 between M1 J46 and Whitkirk Roundabout (Skyliner) was redesignated A6120 in 2001. However following the East Leeds Orbital Route (ELOR) plan completed in 2022, the whole of the old ring road was redesignated as B6902. The former A63 from M1 J46 to Halton dial, where it met the A64 to Leeds had been rerouted via M1 to J45 through Cross Green in 2008 when the John Smeaton Viaduct - Stage 7 of Leeds Inner Ring Road was opened. Part of Selby Road through Halton was redesignated as B6159 which continues to Pudsey via North Leeds Suburbs circumventing Leeds City Centre

== East Leeds Orbital Route (A6120) ==
After a protracted planning process, Leeds City Council announced in June 2018 the awarding of contracts for the East Leeds Orbital Route (ELOR) which runs from Thorpe Park (adjacent to junction 46 of the M1) to join the previous ring road near Red Hall, just to the west of its intersection with the A58.

The 4.7-mile (7.5 km) route cost approximately £120 million and is a dual carriageway throughout, with roundabouts and one Throughabout / Hamburger Roundabout intersecting with roads in East Leeds. The route was opened on 22 August 2022. The road now forms part of the A6120 and a section of the former ring road is now (January 2023) numbered as the B6902.
