= Bokerley Dyke =

Romano-British defensive dyke

Coordinates: 50.97220°N 1.94156°W

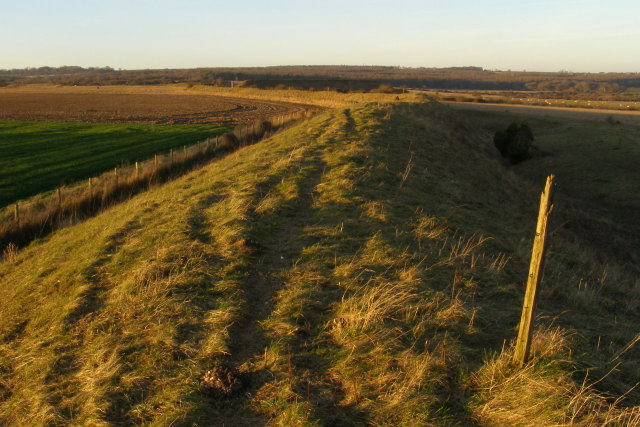
Bokerley Dyke on Martin Down

Bokerley Dyke, Bokerly Dyke, Bokerley Ditch, is a linear earthwork 5.75 kilometres (3.6 mi) long on Cranborne Chase in Dorset, partially running along the county's border with Hampshire between Woodyates and Martin. It is part of a Scheduled Monument together with Grim's Ditch and other associated earthworks.

Bokerley Dyke was excavated by Augustus Pitt Rivers between 1888 and 1891 and by Philip Rahtz in advance of road widening in 1958. Bokerley Dyke may have originated in the Bronze Age or Early Iron Age and formed a political and cultural boundary. It was cut through by a Roman Road (Ackling Dyke running between Old Sarum and Badbury Rings) in the 1st century.

In the 4th century it was remodelled and brought back into use, and excavations show that the Roman road was blocked. A coin of Valens dates this activity to shortly after 364 AD. It may have been built in 367-8 AD when Roman sources report that Britain was attacked by Picts, Scots and Saxons in a supposed Great Conspiracy. The Roman road was later reopened, but the dyke may have continued in use after the cessation of the Roman rule and still forms part of a boundary between the counties of Dorset and Hampshire.

Bokerley Dyke runs through Martin and Tidpit Downs, which is a Site of Special Scientific Interest, and it is continuous with Grim's Ditch.
