= Thorpe Park railway station =

Railway station in West Yorkshire, England

Thorpe Park

General information
- Location: Thorpe Park, City of Leeds; England
- Coordinates: 53.804018°N 1.4248149°W
- Grid reference: SE380343
- Manager: N/A
- Transit authority: West Yorkshire (Metro)
- Platforms: 2

Other information
- Fare zone: 2
Location

Thorpe Park is a proposed railway station, to be sited in the Thorpe Park area to the east of Leeds, England on the Selby Line. The station is likely to be made up of two island platforms, capable of serving inter-city trains.

== History ==
£20 million was allocated to the scheme by the Yorkshire and Humber Regional Transport Board in April 2008. It was originally hoped that construction would begin in 2011, with a completion date of 2012, but the business case was not submitted to the Department for Transport until 2011. The scheme was put on hold due to a lack of central government funding.

The station also featured in plans by Alliance Rail as a stopping point for services between Ilkley/Bradford Forster Square and London Kings Cross to begin in 2017. However, in May 2016, the Office of Rail and Road rejected Alliance Rail's plans to runs services under its GNER banner.

The proposals for East Leeds Parkway have been downplayed in favour of an alternative site at Thorpe Park (which is further west). The West Yorkshire Combined Authority has stated that it is to review the options because of the lack of clarity over the Northern Powerhouse enhancement would mean that only stopping trains (operated by Northern) would stop at any future site.

In November 2017, the ‘Connecting People: Strategic Vision for Rail’ Report by the Government proposed a new station in Thorpe Park as part of a plan to reverse the Beeching Cuts. In May 2021, the government announced £15 million worth of funding for the two railway stations in Leeds to be built (the other being White Rose, which is also on the TransPennine line, but on the west side of Leeds).

Public consultation for the new station opened in summer 2026.

== Facilities ==
As a parkway station (an early name was East Leeds Parkway), the intention would be to allow for a park-and-ride service and the plans include parking for 500 cars, later reduced to 300 spaces. The railway station is very close to the new East Leeds Orbital Road (A6120 bypass), which is at Junction 46 of the M1 motorway.

== Services ==
The station would be served by trains from the west of Leeds which would normally terminate at Leeds station; by continuing eastwards to this station, it is hoped that extra capacity for through trains would be created at Leeds.

Preceding station	National Rail	Following station
Cross Gates	Northern Trains Selby Line	Garforth
