= Grimshaw =

Grimshaw may refer to:

== Places ==
- Grimshaw, Alberta, Canada
- Grimshaw, Lancashire, England
- Grimshaw, Texas, also known as Oil City, built during the beginning of the oil industry and named for Amos Grimshaw, on whose land oil was discovered

== People with the surname Grimshaw ==
- Aiden Grimshaw (b. 1991), English singer
- Arthur Edmund Grimshaw (1868–1913), English artist, composer, organist and conductor
- Arthur John Grimshaw (1933–2019), Australian Anglican clergyman
- Beatrice Grimshaw (1870–1953), Irish writer
- Billy Grimshaw (1892–1968), English footballer
- Charlotte Grimshaw (b. 1966), New Zealand novelist
- Francis Grimshaw (1901–1965), British archbishop
- Gary Grimshaw (1946–2014), American graphic artist and political activist
- John Grimshaw (cyclist) (b. 1945), British cycling activist
- John Grimshaw (politician) (1842–1917), American politician
- John Atkinson Grimshaw (1836–1893), English painter
- John Elisha Grimshaw (1893–1980), English army officer, recipient of the Victoria Cross
- Mortimer Grimshaw (1824 or 1825–1869), English political activist
- Myron Grimshaw (1875–1936), American major league baseball player
- Nicholas Grimshaw (1939–2025), English architect
- Nick Grimshaw (b. 1984), British television and radio presenter
- Percy H. Grimshaw (1869–1939), English entomologist and zoogeographer
- Soto Grimshaw (1833–1900), Argentinian naturalist
- Samuel Grimshaw (1840–1918), American soldier, recipient of the Medal of Honor
- Thomas Wrigley Grimshaw (1839–1900), Irish physician and surgeon, Registrar General for Ireland
- Tracy Grimshaw (b. 1960), Australian television presenter
- Trevor Grimshaw (1947–2001), English artist
- Walter Grimshaw (1832–1890), composer of chess problems

=== Fictional characters ===
- The Grimshaw family in the television soap opera Coronation Street, most notably Eileen, Todd and Jason
- Susan Grimshaw, character in the video game Red Dead Redemption 2

== Other uses ==
- Grimshaw (chess), device found in chess problems, named after Walter Grimshaw
- Grimshaw Architects, British architecture firm founded by Nicholas Grimshaw
- Grimshaw Guitars, British musical instrument manufacturer founded by Emile Grimshaw Snr and his son, Emile Grimshaw Jr
- Grimshaw v. Ford Motor Co., Ford Pinto product liability case that became staple of remedies courses in U.S. law schools
- Grimshaw Club, the International Relations Society of the London School of Economics
