= Martin and Tidpit Downs =

Site of Special Scientific Interest in Hampshire

Coordinates: 50.973°N 1.934°W

- Site of Special Scientific Interest
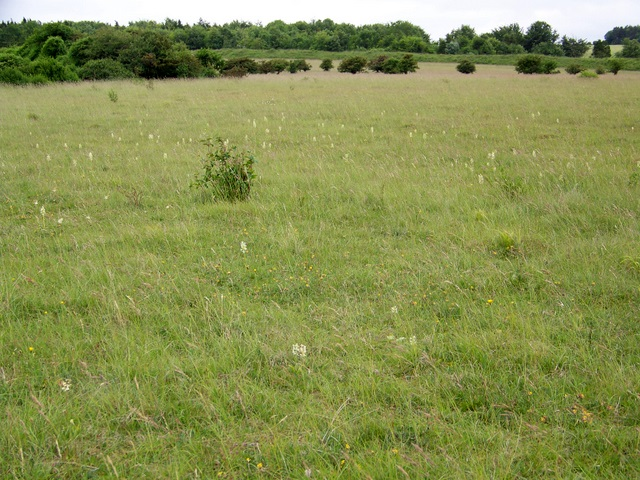
- Location of Martin and Tidpit Downs.
- Area of search: Hampshire
- Grid reference: SU 047 193
- Interest: Biological
- Area: 367.5 hectares (908 acres)
- Notification date: 1987
- Location map: Magic Map

Martin and Tidpit Downs is a 367.5-hectare (908-acre) biological Site of Special Scientific Interest north-west of Fordingbridge in Hampshire. Martin Down is a 341-hectare (840-acre) national nature reserve and an area of 115 hectares (280 acres) is a Nature Conservation Review site, Grade I. Bokerley Dyke, a prehistoric linear earthwork and scheduled monument, runs through the site.

This site is rich in prehistoric earthworks, including Bokerley Dyke. It has chalk grassland, heath and scrub, with a rich herb flora. Sheep grazing is increasing the botanical quality of the grassland. There is an outstanding assemblage of butterflies, with 36 species recorded, including marbled white, dark green fritillary, silver-spotted skipper and Duke of Burgundy.
