= Thorpe Park Leeds =

Business park in Leeds, England

Coordinates: 53.799°N 1.424°W

Thorpe Park
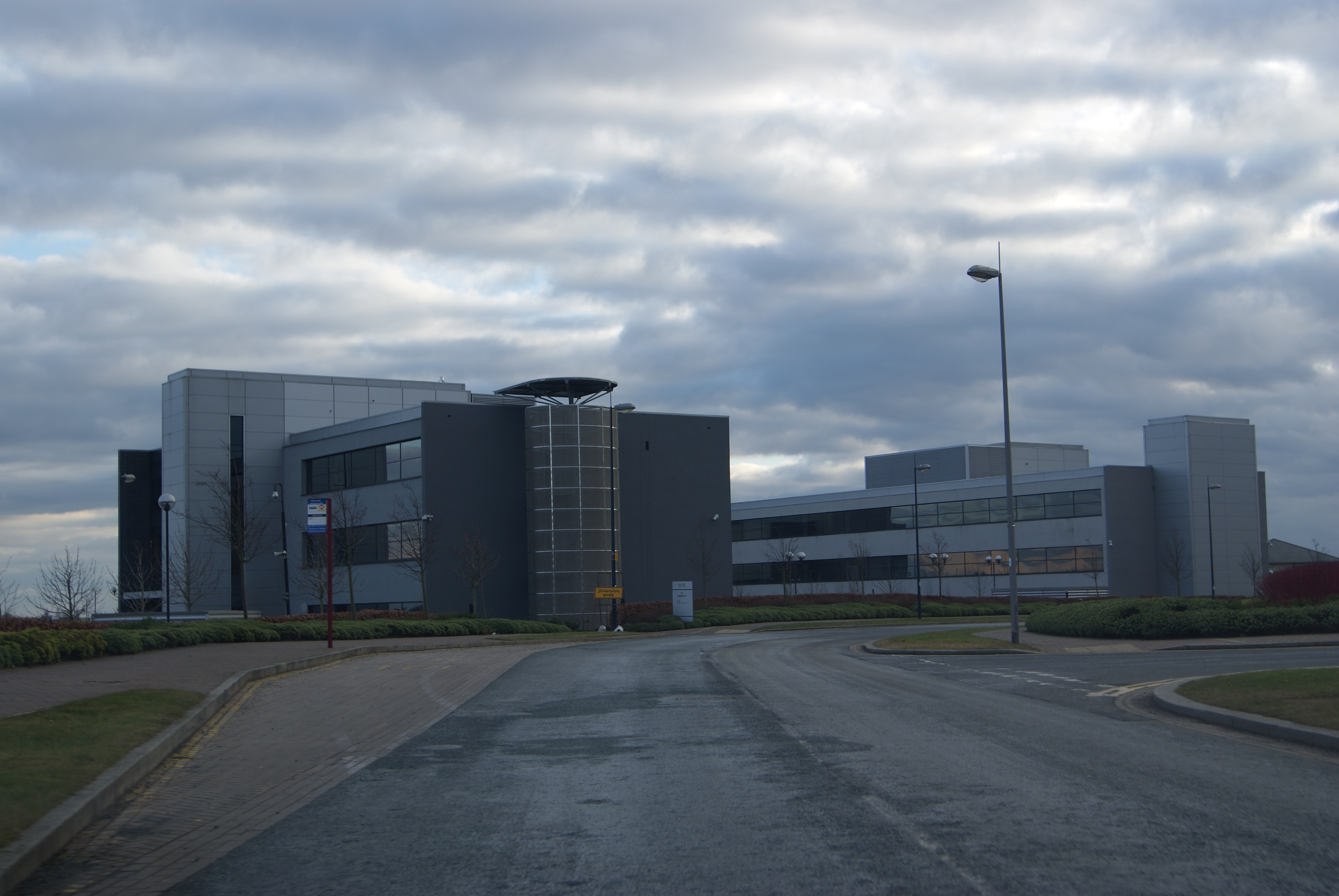
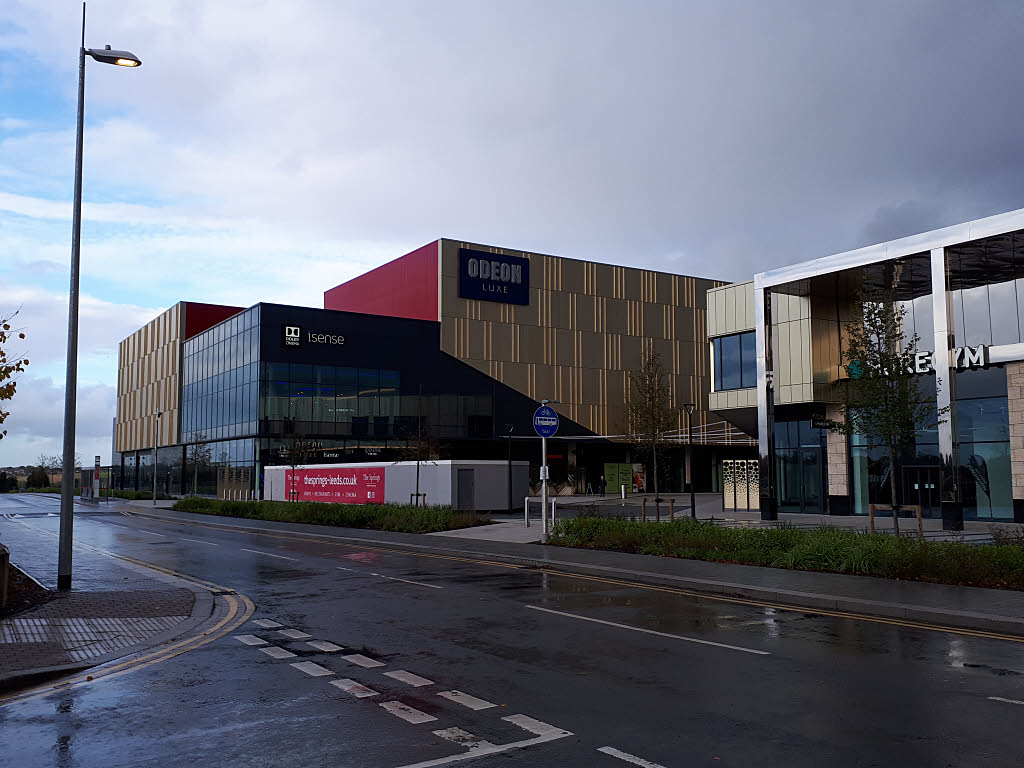
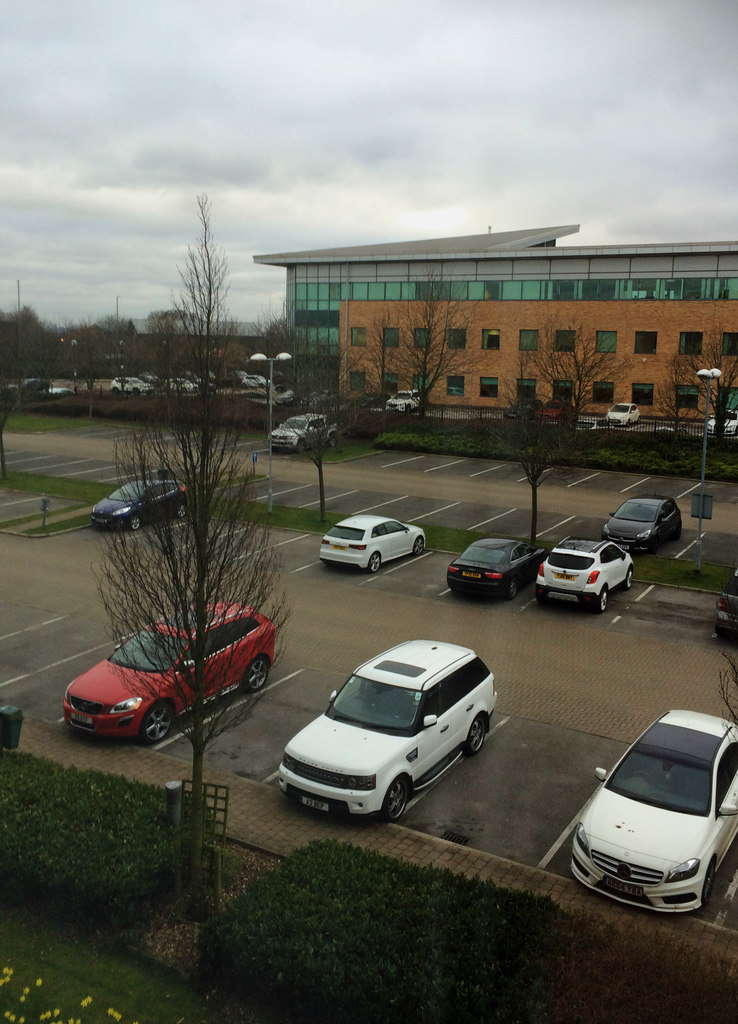
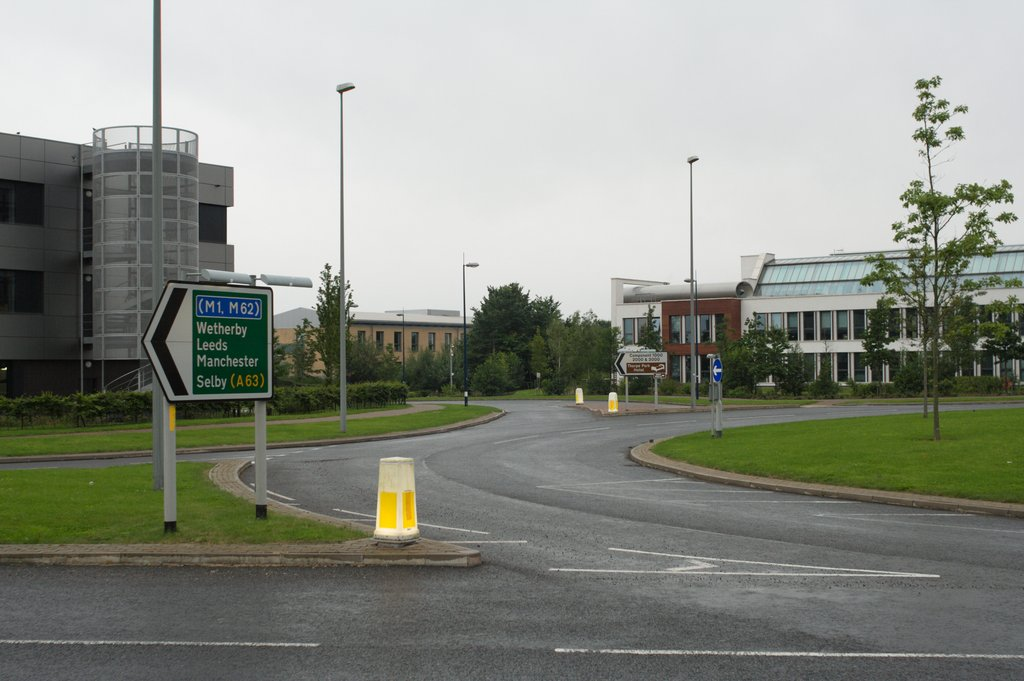
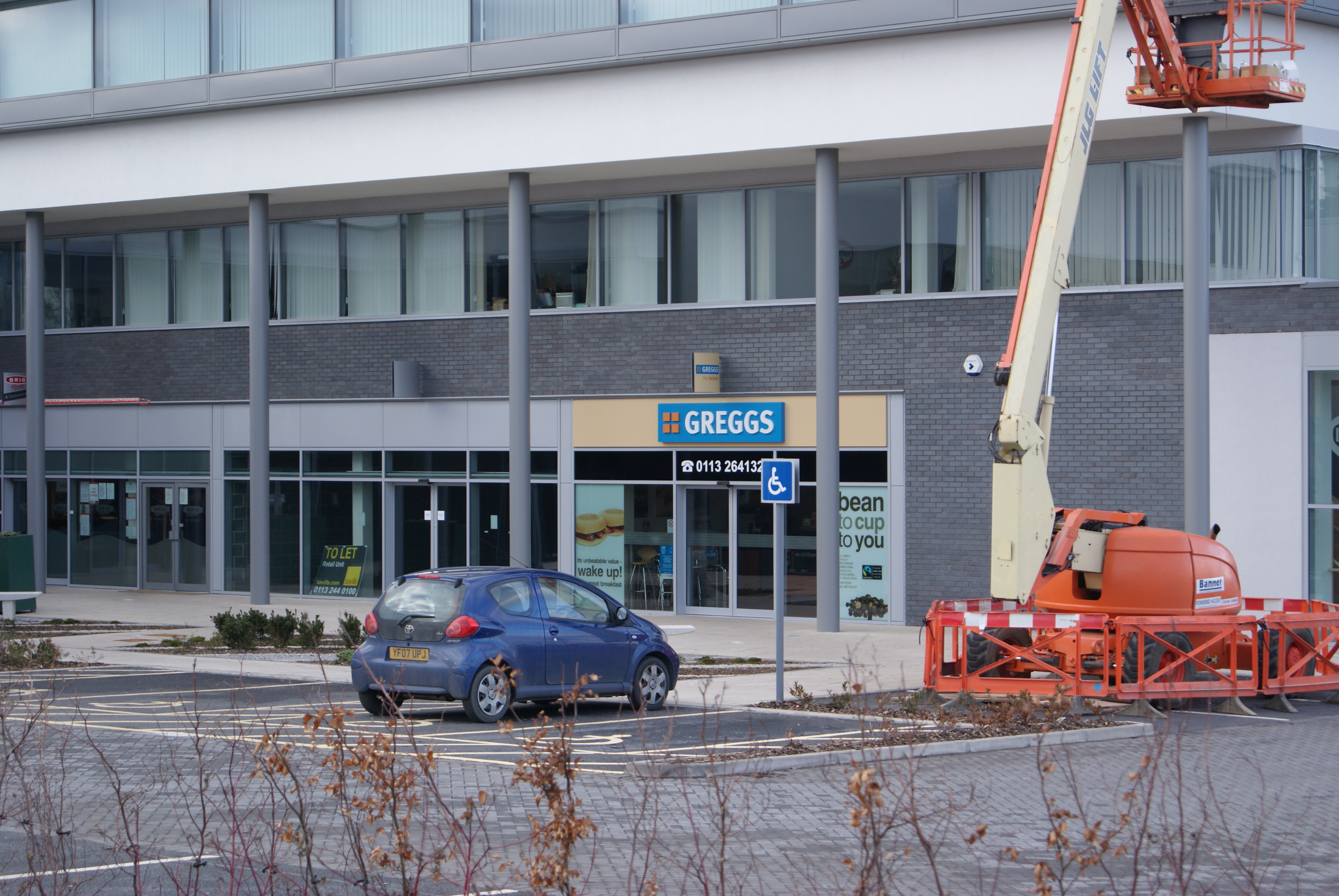
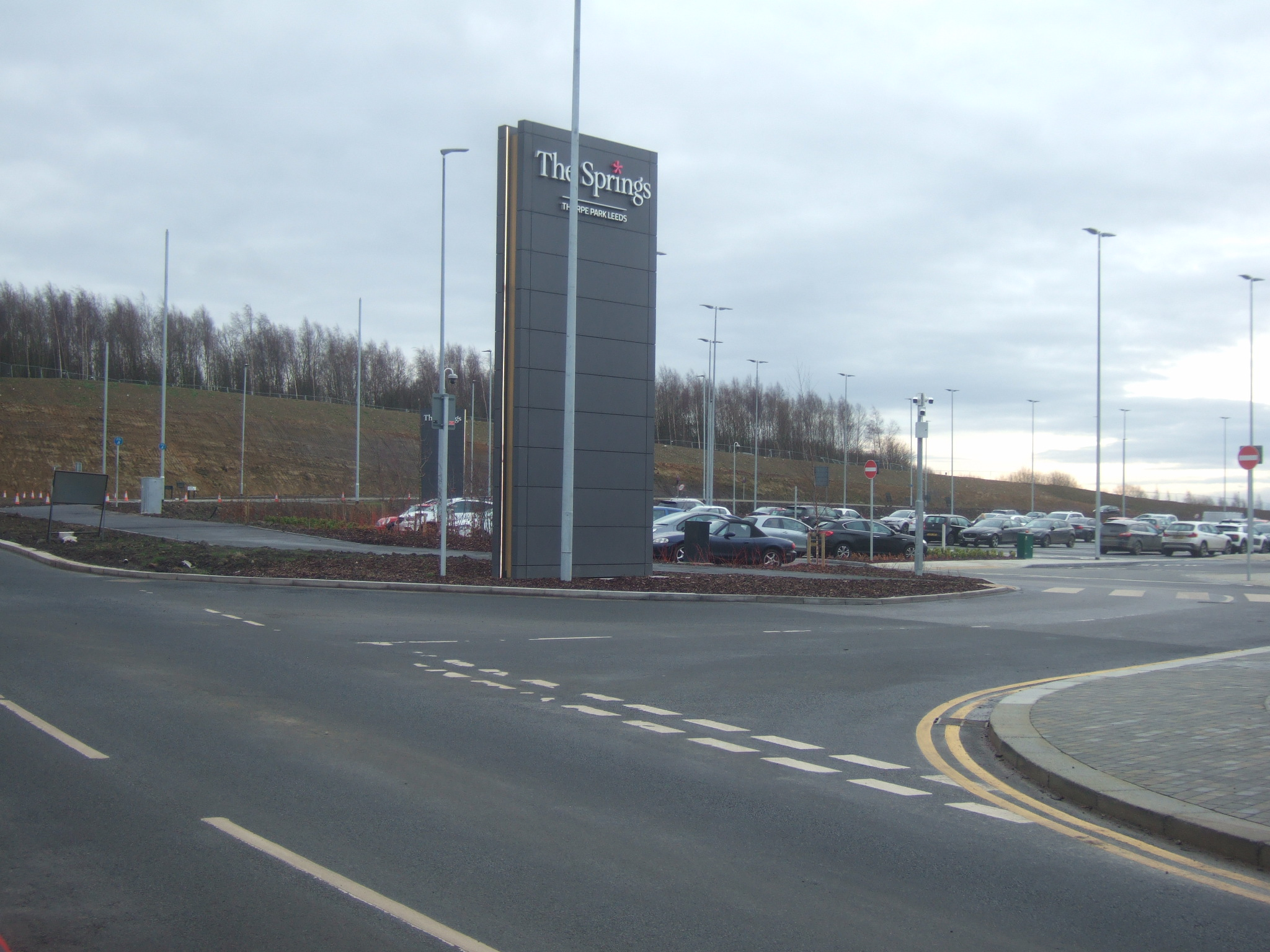
- From top, left to right: Office buildings, an Odeon cinema, Thorpe Park Hotel, view of a roundabout, a Greggs branch and The Springs retail park.

- Location within West Yorkshire
- Metropolitan borough: City of Leeds
- Metropolitan county: West Yorkshire
- Region: Yorkshire and the Humber
- Country: England
- Sovereign state: United Kingdom
- Post town: LEEDS
- Postcode district: LS15
- Dialling code: 0113
- Police: West Yorkshire
- Fire: West Yorkshire
- Ambulance: Yorkshire
- UK Parliament: Leeds East

Thorpe Park Leeds or simply Thorpe Park is a business park located near Brown Moor, Leeds, West Yorkshire, England. Companies that are headquartered in Thorpe Park include Northern Gas Networks, Boost Drinks and Pharmacy2U. The Thorpe Park railway station is anticipated to open in the area in 2024. The overall development of the business park is expected to be complete by 2035.

== History ==
In 2000, Scarborough Group International (SGI) began development on the business park. The chairman of SGI Kevin McCabe said that they wanted to create the "largest and best out of town, mixed-use development that Yorkshire has ever seen".

Phase two development at Thorpe Park Leeds was enabled following an investment deal with Legal & General Capital in 2015.

The Springs retail park was opened in October 2018. In May 2021, a life-size statue of Captain Tom Moore was unveiled at the park before being positioned at Tom Moore's birthplace in Keighley. In August 2021, SGI began development on a £52 million office building which has been pre-let to credit management company, Lowell.
