= Grimshaw Guitars =

British guitar manufacturer

Sample page from ca. 1948 Grimshaw catalogue

Grimshaw Guitars (initially "Emile Grimshaw & Son") was a British manufacturer of guitars and related instruments from the 1930s to the 1980s, known for producing acoustic archtop guitars in the 1930s–1940s, electrified archtop guitars (with pickups) in the 1940s and 1950s, semi-solid (thinline) electric guitars in the 1950s–1960s, and mainly solidbody guitars from the late 1950s to 1980s, along with smaller quantities of banjos (including a "Vivavox" line), hawaiian guitars (both acoustic and solidbody electric), electric bass guitars, acoustic guitars (some with pickups) and nylon string guitars. Their archtop guitars were used by British players from the 1930s to the 1950s, when equivalent (and potentially higher quality) U.S.-made instruments were difficult to obtain in Britain, and their early electric thinline instruments such as the "S.S.1" and "S.S.1 deluxe" (S.S. standing for "short scale") were popular with British "beat" groups of the early 1960s. Sales declined in the later 1960s and 1970s with easier access by customers to better made (and more expensive) U.S. instruments at one end of the scale, and cheaper imported instruments, mostly from Japan, with which the Grimshaw line could not compete on price. The Grimshaw factory closed in the mid 1980s and its junior partner founder, Emile Grimshaw Jnr, died in 1987. Since that time, surviving instruments (for example from the 1960s) occasionally appear on the used market but tend to be somewhat overshadowed in favour of better known instruments of similar age by other British manufacturers such as Burns, Vox, etc.

== History ==
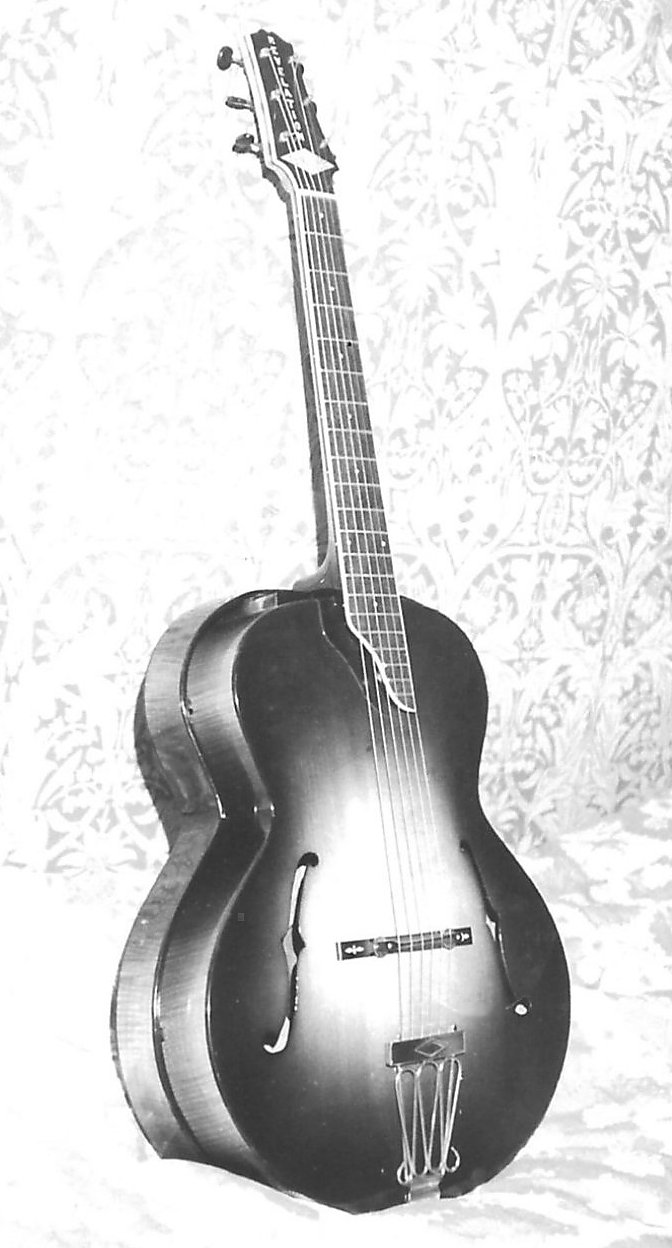
A restored Grimshaw Revelation G.5 archtop acoustic guitar, ca. 1940

Emile Grimshaw, Snr (1880–1943) was a noted banjo player and educator from the early 1900s onwards. According to this site, Emile Snr had an association with the British Clifford Essex banjo manufacturing company during which time he had some banjos constructed under his name by Robert (Bob) Blake of Finchley, London, which bore the mark "E G" or "Hartford" (the significance of the latter name is unknown); a "Grimshaw Hartford" tenor banjo of unspecified date is illustrated here. In 1933 (other sources say 1930), Emile Snr severed his connection with Clifford Essex and set up his own firm "Emile Grimshaw & Son" together with his son, Emile Grimshaw Jnr (1904–1987) to manufacture guitars and some related instruments. The firm aimed to capitalise on the growing popularity of dance band music, in which players formerly using the banjo were switching to the guitar on account of its increased sonority and subtlety compared with the somewhat raucous sound of the banjo. Unfortunately, this being before the era of amplification, most guitars of the day – typically of the archtop variety – had trouble competing in volume with the louder instruments of the dance band, and Emile Snr, with his background associated with banjos and their construction, decided that the principle of the banjo "resonator" (in effect a second back, to reflect more of the sound forward towards the listener) could be adopted to perform an equivalent function with the archtop guitar. (In fact, possibly unknown to Grimshaw, a similar experimental guitar model had been constructed by C.F. Martin & Company, the well known U.S. guitar manufacturer, who constructed a few such instruments, in both 4-string and 6-string versions, in around 1930 for the Paramount Banjo Co., however the instrument was not a success and only around 36 were produced).

Calling their new-style archtop with resonator back the "Revelation" line ("the result of many years actual playing experience and experimental research" according to their 1936 catalogue), and marketed alongside a range of less expensive "Hartford" archtops which lacked the external resonator, by 1936 the front page of the "Revelation" catalogue showed photographs of almost 40 different players, each presumably happy with their "Revelation" instrument of choice, while inside, text stated that " 'Revelation' guitars are played exclusively by Sonny Farrer; Shirley Holmes of Larry Brennan's Winter Gardens Band, Blackpool; J.D. Llewellyn; Bill Herbert of the Rocky Mountaineers; Thomas Jackson, Musical Director, Wembley Stadium; Steve Gauna of Alfredo's Gipsy Band and hundreds of other well known players", while other endorsees named in the catalogue included Ronnie Genarder of Jack Payne's band, so it can be presumed that the reception of these instruments was at least moderately successful. In the 1936 catalogue, the cheaper instruments (acoustic only at this time) appear to have been constructed with flat, not arched, tops and with a round soundhole (which, in the resonator-equipped models, was matched by a second soundhole in the back of the primary body to allow sound to diffuse out towards the resonator) and were also offered with another Grimshaw innovation, a fully adjustable, multi-component wooden bridge; both were patented, the resonator back being pat. no. 414200, and the adjustable bridge pat. no. 452570. The top "Revelation" models G.4 and G.5, along with the non-resonator "Hartford 12", were being offered with a better quality curved (carved) rather than flat top (soundboard) and also (by the 1940 catalogue) with f-holes as an option, as an alternative to the previously standard single round soundhole. Also in the 1940 catalogue, a range of "E.G." banjos were included (models were Minor, Major, Superex and Grand, along with several "Vivavox" models and one bass banjo). The reference previously citedstates that the banjos sold under the "Vivavox" line were initially made by Sidney Young in Houghton's Factory in Birmingham, and from 1942 by Will Mitchell in their own workshop.

Details of instruments offered through the early 1940s are unknown, however by at least 1948 Grimshaw instruments had embraced electrification (for an example see this 1948 film of Stéphane Grappelli including Dave Goldberg on an amplified non cutaway Grimshaw archtop guitar), with a late 1940s catalogue showing electrified versions of the G.5 (the only model still with resonator, also the only non cutaway model) and electrified versions of the G.3, G.6, and new "Plectric" and "Plectric de Luxe" models, the latter being full-thickness archtop guitars with extraordinarily deep cutaways (example image shown at the top of this article), along with 2 electric solidbody "electrahawaiian" instruments somewhat similar to those produced by the Rickenbacker company. Grimshaw also applied for, and later received, a patent for their particular pick-up unit design, which was incorporated into the end of the fingerboard to avoid any structural interference with the acoustical vibrations of the guitar top (volume and tone controls, and the socket for the guitar lead, were located on the elevated plastic fingerboard, for a similar reason).

Grimshaw continued to manufacture deep body archtops through the 1950s and later which were used by British players such as Dave Goldberg and Jack Toogood.

Thinline hollowbodies (or semi-hollowbodies) such as the Gibson ES-335, which were more resistant to feedback at higher volumes, started to appear and be used by rock-and-roll musicians in the late 1950s. Grimshaw's entry into this field was the "S.S." line comprising the "S.S.1" and "S.S.1 deluxe" (S.S. standing for "short scale"), thinline double cutaway instruments of a novel design which found some favour with early British "rock" and "beat" group guitarists including Pete Townshend, Joe Brown, Bruce Welch, Francis Rossi, Spencer Davis, Joe Moretti (lead guitarist on Johnny Kidd & the Pirates' UK number one single "Shakin' All Over"), Alvin Lee and many more.

Many "beat" and "pop" players gravitated towards completely solid instruments; Grimshaw's first response was their "Meteor" model (introduced 1960), followed later in the 1960s with their "G.S.7" and "G.S.33" models, which had an overall body shape similar to the semi-acoustic "S.S." series; several other semi-acoustic instruments were still made, including the G.S.75 (also known as the "Selectric"), in a more conventional double cutaway style somewhat similar to a Gibson 335. By that time, Grimshaw was also offering their take on an acoustic guitar (initially without, and later with an added pickup) called the "Troubadour" model, with a cutaway and D-shaped soundhole somewhat like an early Selmer Maccaferri; at least 2 of these were custom ordered in 12-string versions in the late 1950s, by guitarists Cyril Davies and his friend Len Partridge, as documented in Colin Harper's biography of Bert Jansch and illustrated therein; both Davies and Partridge were seeking to emulate the sound of the 12-string guitar as played by Huddie William Ledbetter, better known as Lead Belly, and no such instruments were otherwise commercially available in Britain at that time. By the mid 1960s with folk revival in full swing, Grimshaw also offered a more conventional, dreadnought shape acoustic (termed by Grimshaw a "jumbo" model), the J.1, "designed specially for vocal accompaniment and C & W [country and western]".

As the 1960s progressed into the 1970s and beyond and accessibility of U.S.-made instruments improved, most professional U.K. players gravitated to these while players starting out were presented with options to buy cheap, mainly Japanese made copies of the same, which left British guitar manufacturing (also including other, more recently arrived solidbody makers such as Burns and Vox) in a situation where it was difficult to compete; Vox moved their production to Japan in 1982 and Burns (by then renamed Baldwin) ceased guitar production in 1970. Grimshaw continued at a low level until the mid 1980s, releasing first some Gibson Les Paul copies (initially during a period when Gibson had ceased their manufacture) and latterly, various special order models such as several double-neck (6+12 string) solidbody instruments. The main arm of the company ceased operations in ca. 1985, although an ex-Grimshaw employee Frank Lonergan continued working under the Grimshaw name until the end of the decade undertaking repairs and refurbishments.

== Current reputation and buyer interest ==
With almost zero player interest in re-creating the 1930s British dance band style, Grimshaw guitars of this period have little value to either players or collectors, and in particular their cheaper models with flat (not arched) tops and round soundholes are not considered at all desirable even with their "curiosity" external resonators in some cases. More "conventional" Grimshaw archtop guitars from the 1940s and 1950s rarely come up for sale so no judgement can be made as to their expected value or desirability, however an all-original "Plectric" or "Plectric de Luxe" might be anticipated to command a reasonably high price. There is some "collector" interest in better preserved examples of the interesting and distinctive "S.S." line from the early 1960s, as evidenced by these two advertisements on the "reverb" sale site, while prices for their other solidbody offerings (excepting rare custom creations) are generally not high.

== List of known models, years and prices ==
=== 1936 catalogue ===
(all prices include case)

- EG "Hartford" (round hole, non-cutaway acoustic archtop guitar, no resonator) – £7.10.0
- EG "Hartford 12" – 12 guineas
- EG "Revelation" (with resonator) – 16 guineas
- EG "Revelation" De-Luxe – 24 guineas
- EG "Revelation" G.4 – 28 guineas
- EG "Revelation" G.5 – 36 guineas
- EG "Revelation" Hawaiian (with resonator) – 16 guineas

=== 1940 catalogue ===
Guitar prices and models unchanged, except "Revelation", G.4 and G.5 offered with "f"-holes as option; also includes the following banjos (prices not including case):

- EG Vivavox 5 – £7.0.0
- EG Minor – £7.0.0
- EG Vivavox 10 – £12.0.0
- EG Major – £12.0.0
- EG Vivavox 16 – £19.0.0
- EG Superex – £19.5.0
- EG Vivavox – £30.0.0
- EG Grand – £30.0.0
- EG Bass Banjo – £12.12.0

=== Late 1940s catalogue (at least 1948; prices not shown) ===
All archtops now have f-holes and a pick-up, optionally can be ordered without; G.5 has resonator, others do not

- E.G. "Hartford 10" (non cutaway archtop)
- "G.3" (non cutaway archtop)
- "G.5 electric" (non cutaway archtop with resonator as well as pick-up)
- "G.6" (non cutaway archtop)
- "Plectric" (deep cutaway archtop, with pick-up)
- "Plectric" de Luxe (deep cutaway archtop, with pick-up)
- E.G. "Electrawaiian" (solid body electric)
- E.G. "Electrawaiian" Model B (solid body electric)

=== 1958 price list ===
As per copy here

Acoustic archtops:

- E.G. Hartford non-cutaway – £26.19.0
- E.G. Hartford with cutaway – £29.15.0
- Hartford 10 non-cutaway – £38.17.0
- Hartford 10 with cutaway – £43.8.0
- G.3 (without pickup) – £48.6.0
- Hartford 12 with cutaway – £52.10.0
- G.6 (without pickup) – £56.7.0
- Supreme (without pickup) – £69.6.0

"Electroacoustic" archtops (with pickup):

- E.G. Hartford non-cutaway – £34.6.0
- E.G. Hartford with cutaway – £37.2.0
- Hartford 10 non-cutaway – £46.4.0
- Hartford 10 with cutaway – £50.15.0
- G.3 – £55.13.0
- Plectric – £61.19.0
- G.6 de Luxe – £63.14.0
- Plectric de Luxe – £70.0.0
- Supreme – £70.0.0
- Plectric Supreme – £84.0.0

"Short scale twin unit plectrum guitars" – double cutaway, shallow body depth, twin pickups ("S.S." range introduced in 1956)

- S.S.1 – £47.12.0
- S.S.1 Bass guitar – £57.15.0

Flat top guitars

- E.G. Troubadour (flat-top) non-cutaway – £39.18.0
- E.G. Troubadour (flat-top) with cutaway – £44.2.0

(prices also given for nylon string and electric steel guitars)

Ca.1962 (stated)

- Grimshaw Troubadour 12-string version (special order)

=== 1963 Model range description ===
Details here

- S.S. Supreme (new model)
- S.S. De Luxe
- S.S. Bass guitar
- Meteor ("S.S. Solid") (first listed 1960) – Grimshaw's first solidbody, slab construction with 2 humbucking pickups

Some other models continued to be available including the archtop E.G. Hartford and Hartford cutaway, the Hartford 10 (same), Supreme (non cutaway) and Plectric Supreme (with cutaway), and the flat top Troubadour in both cutaway and non-cutaway versions, as well as 2 nylon string models. The Plectric Supreme came in for particularly detailed promotion: "This instrument is used by Jack McKechnie in The Hedley Ward Trio, Dick Boudreau, Canada's ace session guitarist, Sid Levy, U.S. Corps of Signals, Cyril Lobo, Radio Athlone, Eire, Larry Day and Johnny Morphies, U.S. 3rd Air Force, Wally Baron, Southern Rhodesia, 'Happy' Hands, Arizona, Zol Underwood, Texas, Don Hoggan, Australia, and many others."

=== Late 1960s catalogues ===
- G.S.30 (Les Paul style solidbody, carved top) – also badged as Park (for Park Guitars);
- G.B.30 Bass guitar (Les Paul shape solidbody bass)
- G.S.7 (new Grimshaw solidbody shape, slab construction, somewhat like S.S. shape, with single coil pickups)
- G.S.33 (same, with humbucking pickups)
- G.S.75 (semi-acoustic, somewhat like Gibson 335/Epiphone Casino shape))
- T.6 E Troubadour – based on previous acoustic-only Troubadour (with cutaway), with added pickup to end of fingerboard, tone and volume controls on soundboard (as per Gibson J-160E)

Another 1960s catalogue (2 pages only seen) shows the G.S.75, under the name "Selectric", priced at £154, and a thinline semi-acoustic bass (S.S. type shape) labelled the "Supreme" at £105.

=== Unknown dates ===
- Grimshaw Les Paul style/G.S.30 in 12 string version
- Grimshaw GTC "slab style" twin neck (6+12 string) solidbody

1969/70 (quoted date):

- Grimshaw GSG twin neck (6+12 string) solidbody

1978 (quoted date)

- Grimshaw GSC solidbody, twin single coil pickups (new body shape)
