= Thomas Wrigley Grimshaw =

Irish physician (1839–1900)

Thomas Wrigley Grimshaw CB (16 November 1839 – 23 January 1900) was an Irish physician, surgeon and statistician who became Registrar General for Ireland from 1879 to 1900.

== Life ==
He was born in Whitehouse, County Antrim, the only child of Wrigley Grimshaw and Alicia Grimshaw. His father Wrigley Grimshaw was an eminent dentist and was dental surgeon to Dr Steevens' Hospital and St. Mark's Hospital, Dublin.

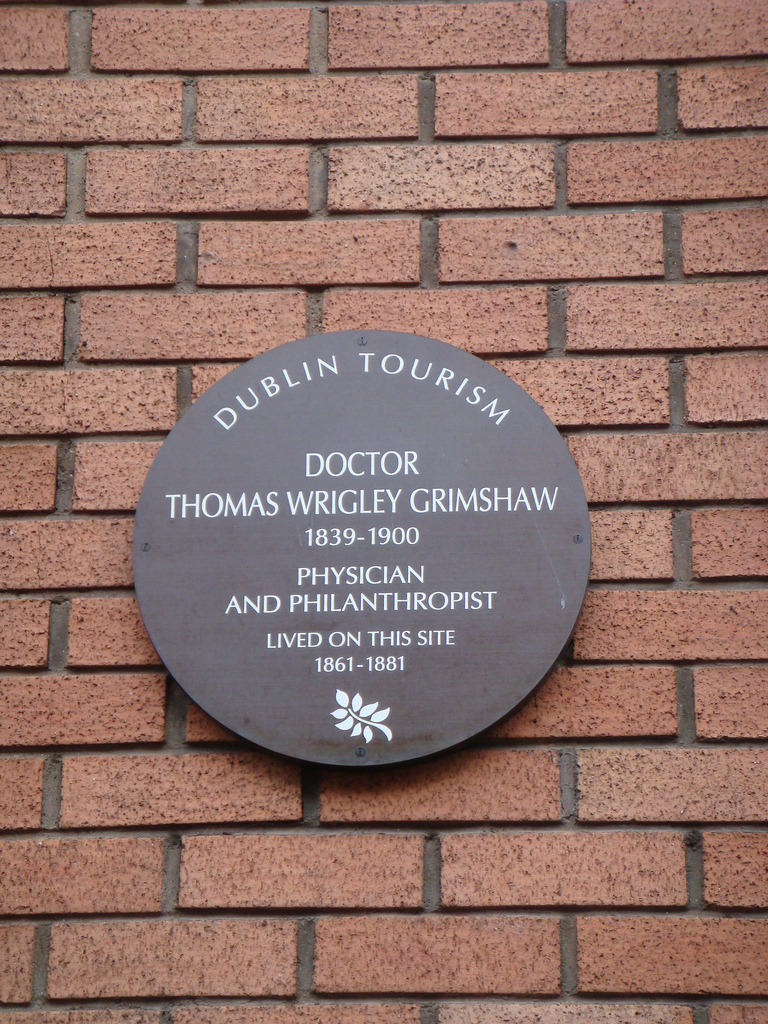
Plaque in Molesworth St

He entered Trinity College, Dublin in 1858 and graduated in Arts in 1860, proceeding to the M.B. and M. Chir., degrees in 1861, and M.D. in 1867, while working at Dr Steevens' Hospital and Sir Patrick Dun's Hospital. He became a physician to the Coombe Women's Hospital and held several lectureships in Dr Steevens' Hospital.

In 1879 he was appointed Registrar General for Ireland. He was President of the Statistical and Social Inquiry Society of Ireland, and was known as a distinguished statistician.

He was also one of the founders of the Dublin Sanitary Association and of the Dublin Artisans' Dwellings Company Limited.

In 1897 he was elected President of the Royal College of Physicians of Ireland, and the same year he was appointed a Companion of the Order of the Bath (CB).

He was married in 1865 to Sarah Elizabeth Thomas with whom he had nine sons and three daughters. They lived at 13 Molesworth Street, Dublin (now the Passport Office).

Grimshaw died at his residence at Carrickmines, County Dublin, on 23 January 1900.

== References and sources ==
Notes

Sources

- Fleetwood, John F. (1983). The History of Medicine in Ireland. Dublin: Skellig Press. ISBN 0-946241-02-3.
- Breathnach, Caoimhghín S.; Moynihan, John B. (January 2009). "Thomas Wrigley Grimshaw (1839-1900). Registrar general 1879-1900". The Ulster Medical Journal. 78 (1): 43–50. ISSN 0041-6193. PMC 2629020. PMID 19252730.
