= Leslie A. Marchand =

American scholar of English literature

- Born: February 13, 1900; Bridgeport, Washington
- Died: July 11, 1999 (aged 99); Englewood, Florida
- Occupation: Academic
- Spouse: Marion Hendrix

Leslie Alexis Marchand (February 13, 1900 – July 11, 1999) was an American scholar of English literature, who is chiefly notable for his contribution to the study of the Romantic poet Lord Byron, in particular his twelve-volume edition of Byron's Letters and Journals, published between 1973 and 1982, with a supplementary volume in 1994, and Byron: a Biography (Alfred A. Knopf, 1957). He was also a prolific contributor to literary periodicals.

== Biography ==
=== Early life ===
Born in Washington in 1900, Leslie A. Marchand's "parents were French-speaking immigrants to the United States, and Leslie always liked to hear the French echo by stressing the second syllable of his name."

=== Academic career ===
Marchand studied journalism at the University of Washington, graduating with a B.A. in 1922 and an M.A. in 1923. After graduation, he took up a teaching position at Farthest North College in Alaska (Alaska Agricultural College and School of Mines), where he lectured on English and French literature.

In 1929, Marchand began studies towards a PhD at Columbia University. His dissertation, The Athenaeum: A Mirror of Victorian Culture, a study of the British nineteenth-century periodical, The Athenaeum, was published in 1941.

He joined the faculty at Rutgers University in 1937 and taught there until his retirement in the mid-1960s.

=== Contribution to Byron studies ===
Recognizing that manuscripts related to Lord Byron were likely to be scattered across Europe, Marchand set out to gather whatever he could find and to make previously unpublished materials available to the scholarly community. Serendipity played a role in his success in this endeavor:

Perhaps the most dramatic find of all was at a bookshop, where the owner mentioned that he had some things from Ockham Park, home of Byron's grandson, the Earl of Lovelace. These turned out to be routine books, but then the fellow mentioned he had a few notebooks. "They have writing in them," said the bookseller. "I don't know what they are, but if you want them, you can have them." They were by Byron's wife.
