= Epitaph to a Dog =

1808 poem by Lord Byron

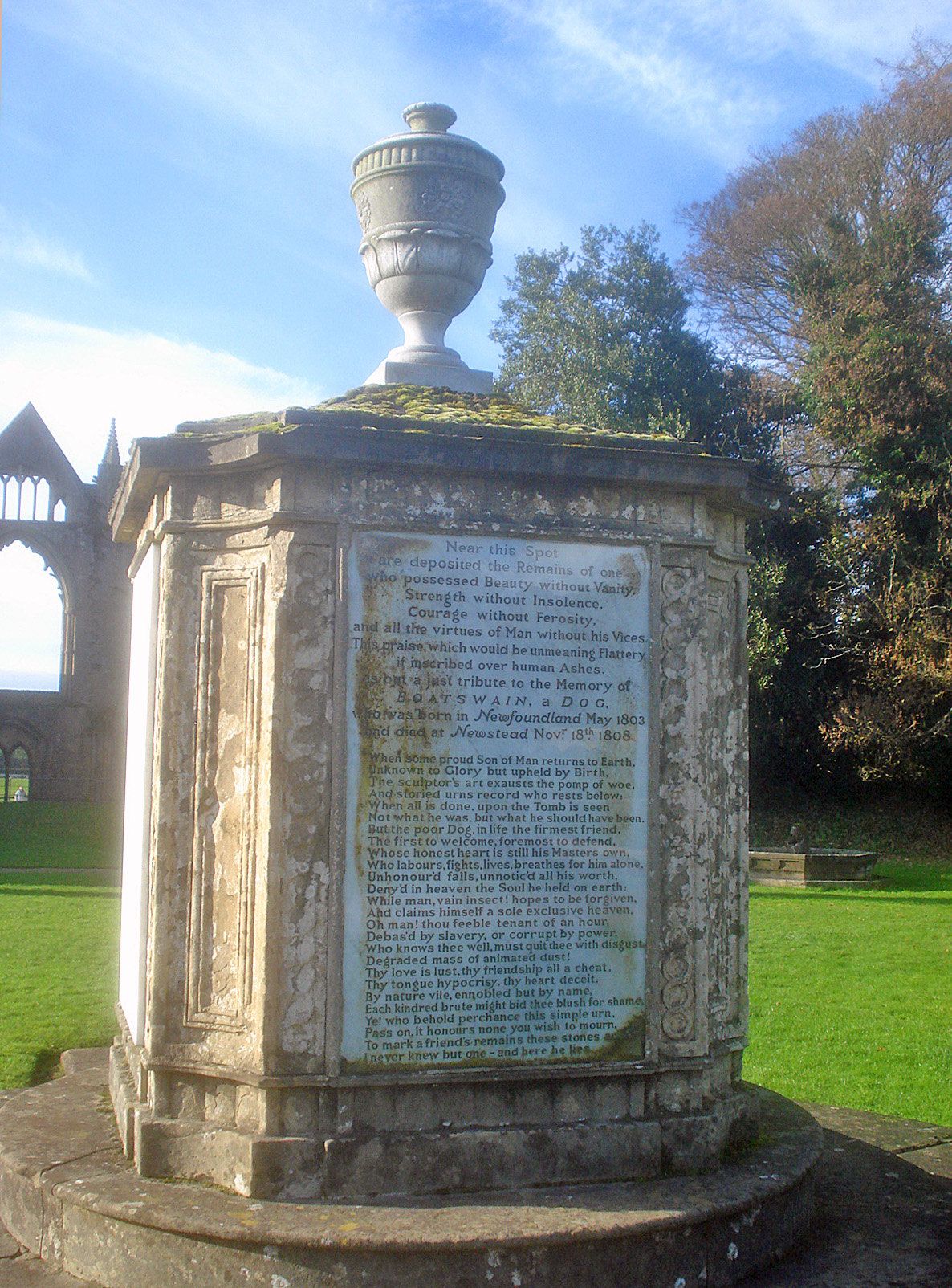
Boatswain's Monument at Newstead Abbey

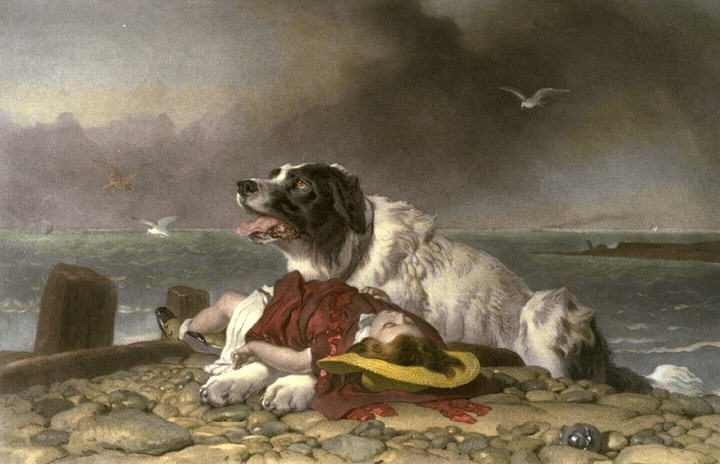
A Landseer dog, the breed Byron eulogized, painted by Edwin Henry Landseer, 1802–1873

"Epitaph to a Dog" (also sometimes referred to as "Inscription on the Monument to a Newfoundland Dog") is a poem by the British poet Lord Byron. It was written in 1808 in honour of his Landseer dog, Boatswain, who had just died of rabies.

== Background ==
When his dog Boatswain contracted the disease, Byron reportedly nursed him without any fear of becoming bitten and infected. The poem is inscribed on Boatswain's tomb, which is larger than Byron's, at Newstead Abbey, Byron's estate.

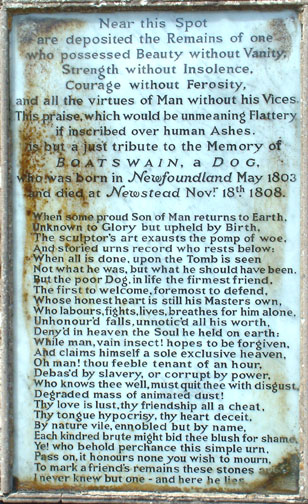
The poem as inscribed on Boatswain's monument

The sections above the poem form a memorial eulogy to Boatswain, and introduce the poem. Though often assumed to form part of the poem, they were written not by Byron but by his friend John Hobhouse. A letter of 1830 by Hobhouse suggests that Byron had planned to use the last two lines of his poem by way of an introductory inscription, but found he preferred Hobhouse's comparison of the attributes of dogs and people.

The poem was published in the 1809 Imitations and Translations collection and in the 1811 issue of The Scourge magazine.

== Text ==
Near this Spot
are deposited the Remains of one
who possessed Beauty without Vanity,
Strength without Insolence,
Courage without Ferosity,
and all the virtues of Man without his Vices.
This praise, which would be unmeaning Flattery
if inscribed over human Ashes,
is but a just tribute to the Memory of
Boatswain, a Dog
who was born in Newfoundland May 1803
and died at Newstead November 18th 1808.

When some proud Son of Man returns to Earth,
Unknown to Glory but upheld by Birth,
The sculptor's art exhausts the pomp of woe,
And storied urns record who rests below.
When all is done, upon the Tomb is seen
Not what he was, but what he should have been.
But the poor Dog, in life the firmest friend,
The first to welcome, foremost to defend,
Whose honest heart is still his Masters own,
Who labours, fights, lives, breathes for him alone,
Unhonour'd falls, unnotic'd all his worth,
Deny'd in heaven the Soul he held on earth.
While man, vain insect! hopes to be forgiven,
And claims himself a sole exclusive heaven.

Oh man! thou feeble tenant of an hour,
Debas'd by slavery, or corrupt by power,
Who knows thee well, must quit thee with disgust,
Degraded mass of animated dust!
Thy love is lust, thy friendship all a cheat,
Thy tongue hypocrisy, thy heart deceit,
By nature vile, ennobled but by name,
Each kindred brute might bid thee blush for shame.
Ye! who behold perchance this simple urn,
Pass on, it honours none you wish to mourn.
To mark a friend's remains these stones arise;
I never knew but one — and here he lies.

== Renovation ==
The tomb underwent renovations in 1987.
