= Lord Byron =

British poet (1788–1824)

The Right Honourable The Lord Byron FRS
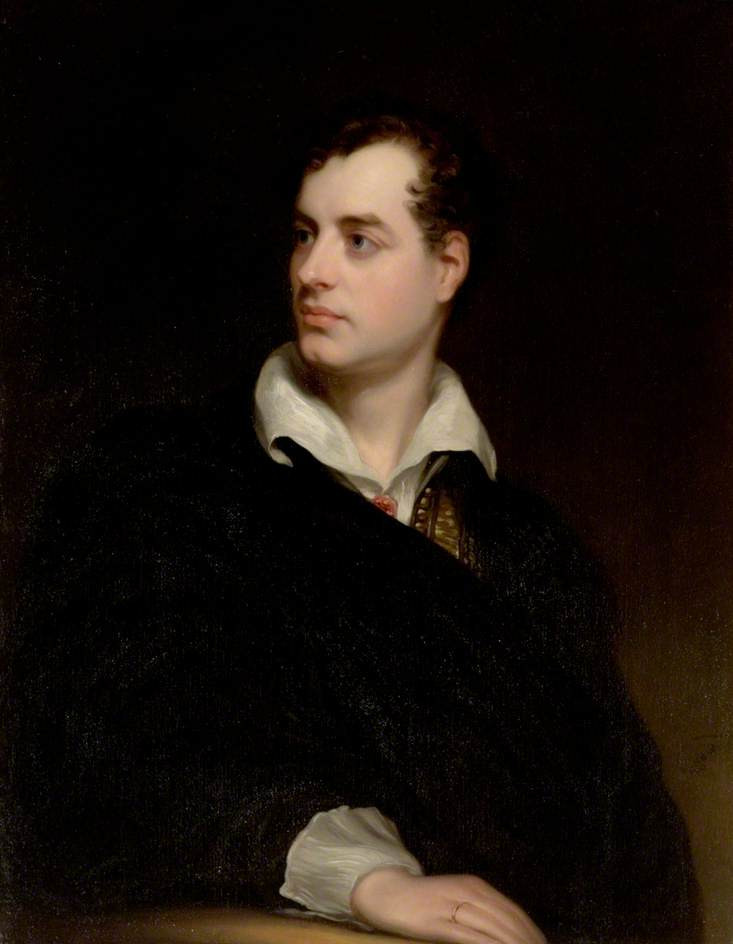
- Portrait of Lord Byron, c. 1813
- Born: George Gordon Byron; 22 January 1788; London, England
- Died: 19 April 1824 (aged 36); Missolonghi, First Hellenic Republic
- Resting place: Church of St Mary Magdalene, Hucknall, Nottinghamshire
- Education: Trinity College, Cambridge
- Occupations: Poet; politician
- Spouse: Anne Isabella Milbanke (m. 1815; sep. 1816)
- Partner: Claire Clairmont
- Children: Ada King, Countess of Lovelace; Allegra Byron; Elizabeth Medora Leigh (presumed)
- Parent: John Byron (father) Catherine Gordon (mother)
- Writing career
- Notable works: Childe Harold's Pilgrimage, Don Juan, Manfred, The Giaour
- Movement: Romanticism

Member of the House of Lords; Lord Temporal
- In office 13 March 1809 – 19 April 1824; Hereditary peerage
- Preceded by: The 5th Baron Byron
- Succeeded by: The 7th Baron Byron

Signature
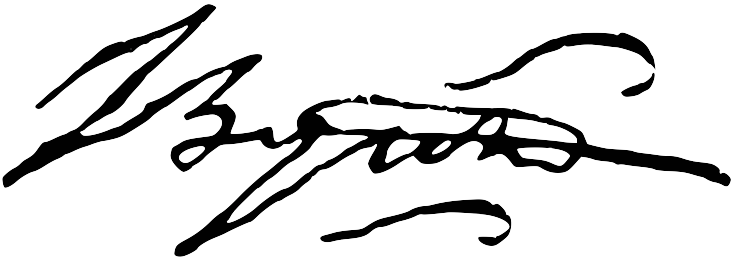

George Noel Gordon Byron, 6th Baron Byron (22 January 1788 – 19 April 1824), known as Lord Byron was a British poet. He was one of the major figures of the Romantic movement, and is regarded as being among the greatest British poets. Among his best known works are the lengthy narratives Don Juan and Childe Harold's Pilgrimage; many of his shorter lyrics in Hebrew Melodies also became popular.

Byron was educated at Trinity College at the University of Cambridge. Following graduation, he travelled extensively in Europe, living for seven years in Italy, in Venice, Ravenna, Pisa, and Genoa, as he was forced to flee England after receiving threats of lynching. During his stay in Italy, he would frequently visit his friend and fellow poet Percy Bysshe Shelley. Later in life, Byron joined the Greek War of Independence to fight the Ottoman Empire, for which Greeks revere him as a folk hero. He died in 1824, aged 36, from a fever contracted after the first and second sieges of Missolonghi.

== Early life ==
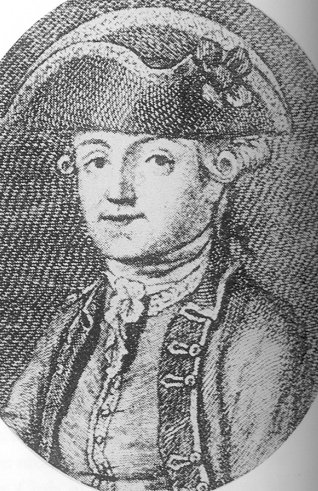
An engraving of Byron's father, Captain John "Mad Jack" Byron, date unknown

=== Family ===
George Gordon Byron, later George Noel Gordon Byron, was born on 22 January 1788, on Holles Street in London; his birthplace is now supposedly occupied by a branch of the department store John Lewis. His family in the English Midlands can be traced back without interruption to Ralph de Buran, who arrived in England with William the Conqueror in the 11th century. His land holdings are listed in the Domesday Book of 1086.

Byron was the only child of Captain John 'Jack' Byron and his second wife, Catherine Gordon (of the Clan Gordon), heiress of the Gight estate in Aberdeenshire, Scotland. Byron's paternal grandparents were Vice Admiral John Byron and Sophia Trevanion. Having survived a shipwreck as a teenage midshipman, Byron's grandfather set a new speed record for circumnavigating the globe. After he became embroiled in a tempestuous voyage during the American War of Independence, he became nicknamed 'Foul-Weather Jack' Byron by the press.

Byron's father had previously been somewhat scandalously married to Amelia Osborne, Marchioness of Carmarthen, with whom he was having an affair – the wedding took place just weeks after her divorce from her husband, and she was around eight months pregnant. The marriage was not a happy one, and their first two children – Sophia Georgina, and an unnamed boy – died in infancy. Amelia herself died in 1784 almost exactly a year after the birth of their third child, the poet's half-sister Augusta Mary. Though Amelia died from a wasting illness, probably tuberculosis, the press reported that her heart had been broken out of remorse for leaving her husband. Nineteenth-century sources blamed Jack's own "brutal and vicious" treatment of her.

Jack then married Catherine Gordon of Gight on 13 May 1785, by all accounts only for her fortune. To claim his second wife's estate in Scotland, Byron's father took the additional surname "Gordon", becoming "John Byron Gordon", and occasionally styled himself "John Byron Gordon of Gight". Byron's mother had to sell her land and title to pay her new husband's debts. In the space of two years, the large estate, worth some £23,500 (equivalent to £3,053,949 in 2023), was squandered, leaving the former heiress with an annual income in trust of only £150 (equivalent to £19,493 in 2023). In a move to avoid his creditors, Catherine accompanied her husband to France in 1786, but returned to England at the end of 1787 to give birth to her son.

=== Birth ===
Byron was born in January 1788, and christened at St Marylebone Parish Church. His father appears to have wished to call his son 'William', but as he remained absent, Byron's mother named him after her own father, George Gordon of Gight, who was a descendant of James I of Scotland and who had died by suicide some years earlier, in 1779.

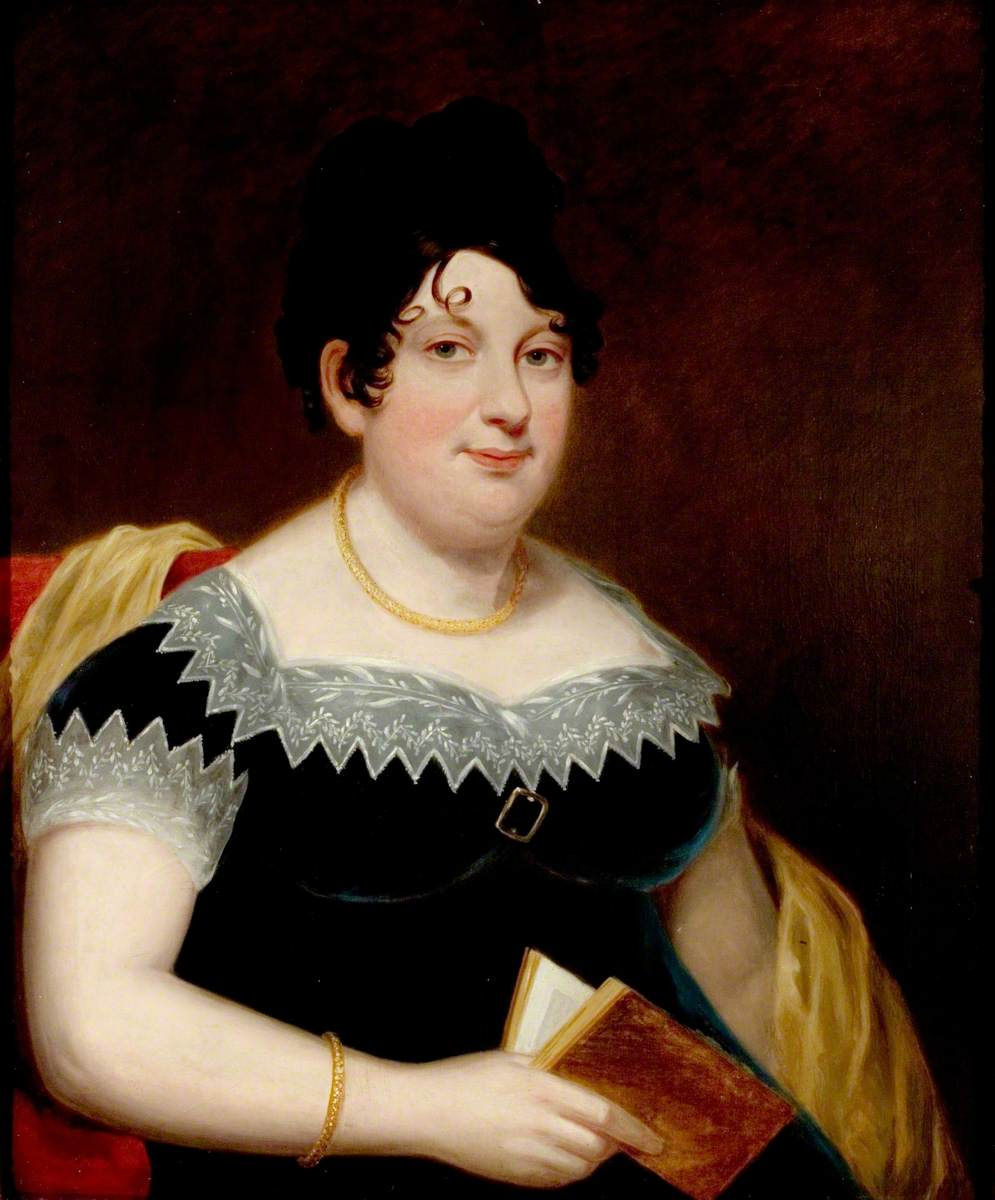
Catherine Gordon, Byron's mother, by Thomas Stewardson

Byron's mother moved back to Aberdeenshire in 1790, and Byron spent part of his childhood there. His father soon joined them in their lodgings in Queen Street, Aberdeen, but the couple quickly separated. Catherine regularly experienced mood swings and bouts of melancholy, which could be partly explained by her husband's continuously borrowing money from her. As a result, she fell even further into debt to support his demands. One of these loans enabled him to travel to Valenciennes, France, where he died of a "long & suffering illness" – probably tuberculosis – in 1791.

When Byron's great-uncle, who was posthumously labelled the "wicked" Lord Byron, died on 21 May 1798, the 10-year-old became the sixth Baron Byron of Rochdale and inherited the ancestral home, Newstead Abbey in Nottinghamshire. His mother took him to England, but the Abbey was in a state of disrepair, and rather than live there she decided to lease it to Lord Grey de Ruthyn, among others, during Byron's adolescence.

Described by some biographers as "a woman without judgment or self-command", Catherine allegedly either spoiled and indulged her son or vexed him with her capricious stubbornness. Her drinking disgusted him and he often mocked her for being short and corpulent, so that it was difficult for her to catch him to discipline him. Byron had been born with a deformed right foot; his mother once retaliated and, in a fit of temper, referred to him as "a lame brat". However, Byron's biographer, Doris Langley Moore, in her 1974 book Accounts Rendered, paints a more sympathetic view of Mrs Byron as a staunch supporter of her son, who sacrificed her own precarious finances to keep him in luxury at Harrow and Cambridge. Langley-Moore questions the 19th-century biographer John Galt's claim that she over-indulged in alcohol.

== Education ==
Byron received his early formal education at Aberdeen Grammar School from January 1795 until his move back to England as a 10-year-old. In August 1799 he entered the school of Dr William Glennie, in Dulwich. Placed under the care of a Dr. Bailey, he was encouraged to exercise in moderation, but could not restrain himself from "violent" bouts of activity in an attempt to compensate for his deformed foot. His mother interfered with his studies, often withdrawing him from school, which arguably contributed to his lack of self-discipline and his neglect of his classical studies.

Byron was sent to Harrow School in 1801, and remained there until July 1805. An undistinguished student and an unskilled cricketer, he nevertheless represented the school during the first Eton v Harrow cricket match at Lord's in 1805.

His lack of moderation was not restricted to physical exercise. Byron fell in love with Mary Chaworth, whom he met while at school, and she was the reason he refused to return to Harrow in September 1803. His mother wrote, "He has no indisposition that I know of but love, desperate love, the worst of all maladies in my opinion. In short, the boy is distractedly in love with Miss Chaworth." In Byron's later memoirs, "Mary Chaworth is portrayed as the first object of his adult sexual feelings."

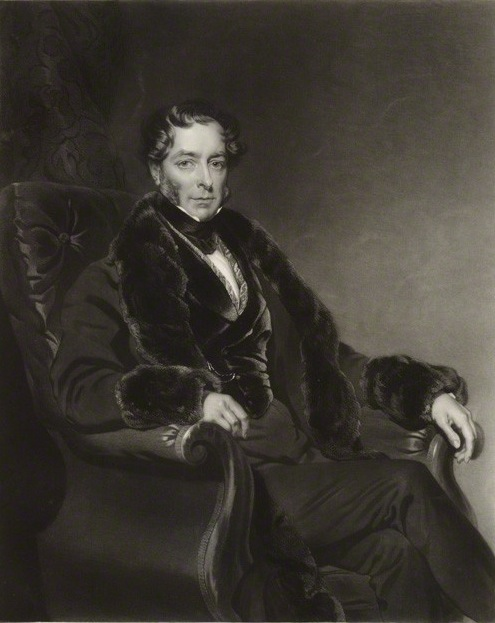
John FitzGibbon, 2nd Earl of Clare

Byron finally returned in January 1804, to a more settled period, which saw the formation of a circle of emotional involvements with other Harrow boys, which he recalled with great vividness: "My school friendships were with me passions (for I was always violent)". The most enduring of those was with John FitzGibbon, 2nd Earl of Clare—four years Byron's junior—whom he was to meet again unexpectedly many years later, in 1821, in Italy. His nostalgic poems about his Harrow friendships, Childish Recollections (1806), express a prescient "consciousness of sexual differences that may in the end make England untenable to him". Letters to Byron in the John Murray archive contain evidence of a previously unremarked (if short-lived) romantic relationship with a younger boy at Harrow, John Thomas Claridge.

In the following autumn he entered Trinity College, Cambridge, where he met and formed a close friendship with the younger John Edleston. About his "protégé" he wrote, "He has been my almost constant associate since October, 1805, when I entered Trinity College. His voice first attracted my attention, his countenance fixed it, and his manners attached me to him for ever." After Edleston's death, Byron composed Thyrza, a series of elegies, in his memory.

In later years, he described the affair as "a violent, though pure love and passion". This statement, however, needs to be read in the context of hardening public attitudes towards homosexuality in England and the sanctions, including public hanging, imposed upon convicted or even suspected offenders. The liaison, on the other hand, may well have been "pure" out of respect for Edleston's innocence, in contrast to the probably more sexually overt relations experienced at Harrow School. The poem "The Cornelian" was written about the cornelian that Byron had received from Edleston.

Byron spent three years at Trinity College, engaging in boxing, horse riding, gambling, and sexual escapades. While at the University of Cambridge, he formed lifelong friendships with men such as John Cam Hobhouse, who initiated him into the Cambridge Whig Club, which endorsed liberal politics, and Francis Hodgson, a Fellow at King's College, with whom he corresponded on literary and other matters until the end of his life.

== Career ==
=== Early career ===
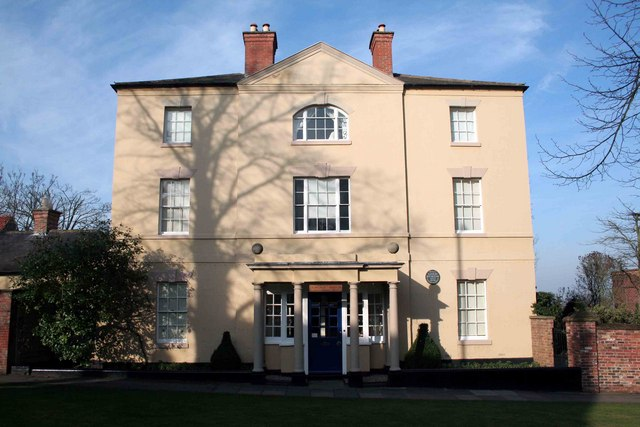
Byron's house, Burgage Manor, in Southwell, Nottinghamshire

While not at school or college, Byron lived at his mother's residence, Burgage Manor in Southwell, Nottinghamshire. While there, he cultivated friendships with Elizabeth Bridget Pigot and her brother John, with whom he staged two plays for the entertainment of the community. During this time, with the help of Elizabeth Pigot, who copied many of his rough drafts, he was encouraged to write his first volumes of poetry. Fugitive Pieces was printed by Ridge of Newark, which contained poems written when Byron was only 17. However, it was promptly recalled and burned on the advice of his friend the Reverend J. T. Becher, on account of its more amorous verses, particularly the poem To Mary. However, not all copies were destroyed, and in fact one copy was kept by Reverend Thomas Becher and later owned by the bibliophile Thomas J. Wise and one was kept by John Pigot who removed the offending pages. There are only four known copies of the 1806 publication that survived the burning.

Hours of Idleness, a collection of many of the previous poems, along with more recent compositions, was the culminating book. It also made known many of his early poems with the inclusion of "On Leaving Newstead Abbey", which is his earliest. It was written in 1803, 5 years following his inheritance of his ancestral estate, Newstead Abbey in 1798. The savage, anonymous criticism it received (now known to be the work of Henry Peter Brougham) in the Edinburgh Review prompted Byron to compose his first major satire, English Bards and Scotch Reviewers (1809). Byron put it into the hands of his relative by marriage Robert Charles Dallas, asking him to "...get it published without his name."

Dallas suggested a large number of changes to the manuscript and provided the reasoning for some of them. Dallas also stated that Byron had originally intended to prefix an argument to this poem, which Dallas quoted. Although it was published anonymously, that April Dallas wrote that "you are already pretty generally known to be the author". The work so upset some of his critics that they challenged Byron to a duel; over time, in subsequent editions, it became a mark of prestige to be the target of Byron's pen.

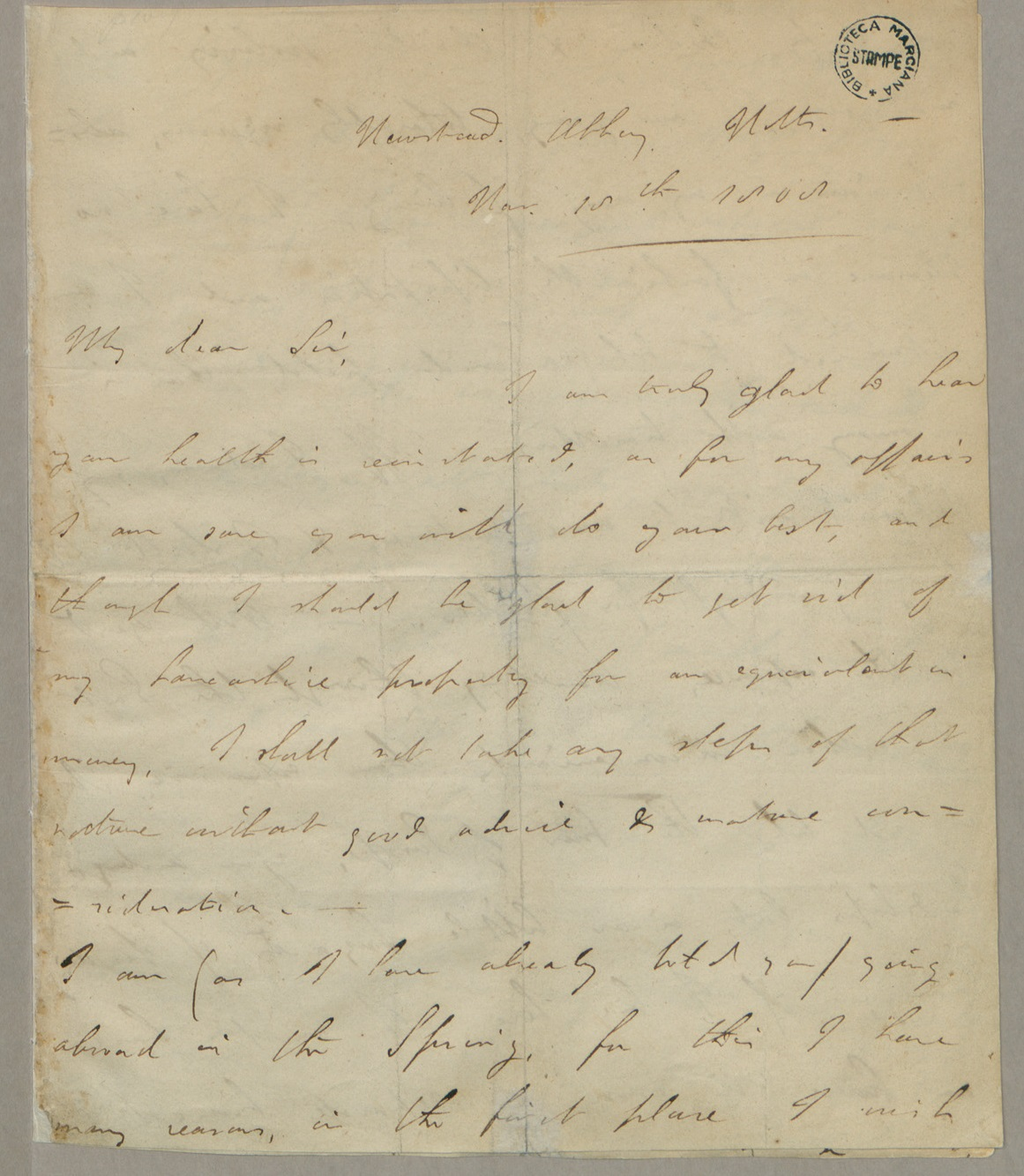
An autographed letter signed to John Hanson, Byron's lawyer and business agent. Fondazione BEIC

After his return from travels he entrusted Dallas, as his literary agent, with the publication of his poem Childe Harold's Pilgrimage, which Byron thought to be of little account. The first two cantos of Childe Harold's Pilgrimage were published in 1812 and were received with critical acclaim. In Byron's own words, "I awoke one morning and found myself famous." He followed up this success with the poem's last two cantos, as well as four equally celebrated "Oriental Tales": The Giaour, The Bride of Abydos, The Corsair, and Lara. About the same time, he began his intimacy with his future biographer, Thomas Moore.

=== First travels to the East ===
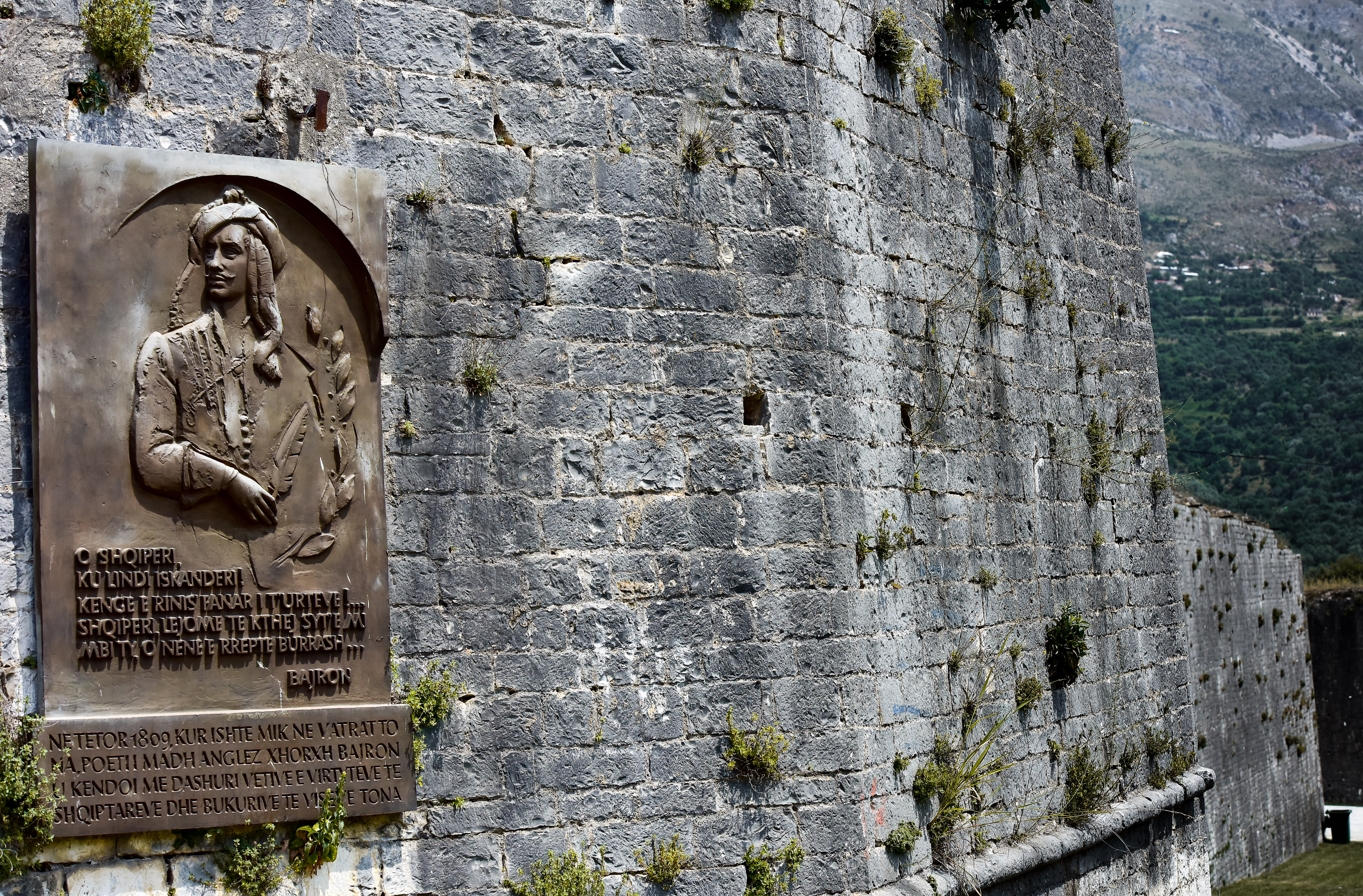
Byron's Stone in Tepelenë, Albania

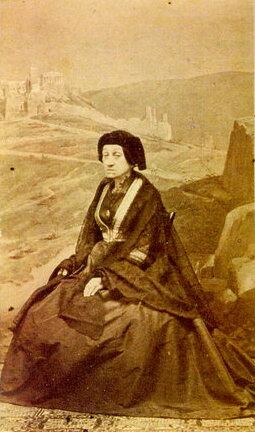
Teresa Makri in 1870

Byron racked up numerous debts as a young man, owing to what his mother termed a "reckless disregard for money". She lived at Newstead during this time, in fear of her son's creditors. He had planned to spend some time in 1808 cruising with his cousin George Bettesworth, who was captain of the 32-gun frigate HMS Tartar, but Bettesworth's death at the Battle of Alvøen in May 1808 made that impossible.

From 1809 to 1811, Byron went on the Grand Tour, then a customary part of the education of young noblemen. He travelled with Hobhouse for the first year, and his entourage of servants included Byron's trustworthy valet, William Fletcher. Hobhouse and Byron often made Fletcher the butt of their humour. The Napoleonic Wars forced Byron to avoid touring in most of Europe; he instead turned to the Mediterranean. His journey enabled him to avoid his creditors and to meet up with a former love, Mary Chaworth, the subject of his poem "To a Lady: On Being Asked My Reason for Quitting England in the Spring".

Another reason for choosing to visit the Mediterranean was probably his curiosity about the Levant. He had read about the Ottoman and Persian lands as a child, was attracted to Islam, especially Sufi mysticism, and later wrote, "With these countries, and events connected with them, all my really poetical feelings begin and end."

Byron began his trip in Portugal, from where he wrote a letter to his friend Mr Hodgson in which he describes what he had learned of the Portuguese language: mainly swear words and insults. Byron particularly enjoyed his stay in Sintra, which he later described in Childe Harold's Pilgrimage as "glorious Eden". From Lisbon he travelled overland to Seville, Jerez de la Frontera, Cádiz, and Gibraltar, and from there by sea to Sardinia, Malta, Albania and Greece. The purpose of Byron's and Hobhouse's travel to Albania was to meet Ali Pasha of Ioannina and to see the country that was, until then, mostly unknown in Britain.

In Athens in 1810, Byron wrote "Maid of Athens, ere we part" for a 12-year-old girl, Teresa Makri.

Byron and Hobhouse made their way to Smyrna, where they cadged a ride to Constantinople on HMS Salsette. On 3 May 1810, while Salsette was anchored awaiting Ottoman permission to dock at the city, Byron and Lieutenant Ekenhead, of Salsette's Marines, swam the Hellespont. Byron commemorated this feat in the second canto of Don Juan. He returned to England from Malta in July 1811 aboard HMS Volage.

=== England 1811–1816 ===
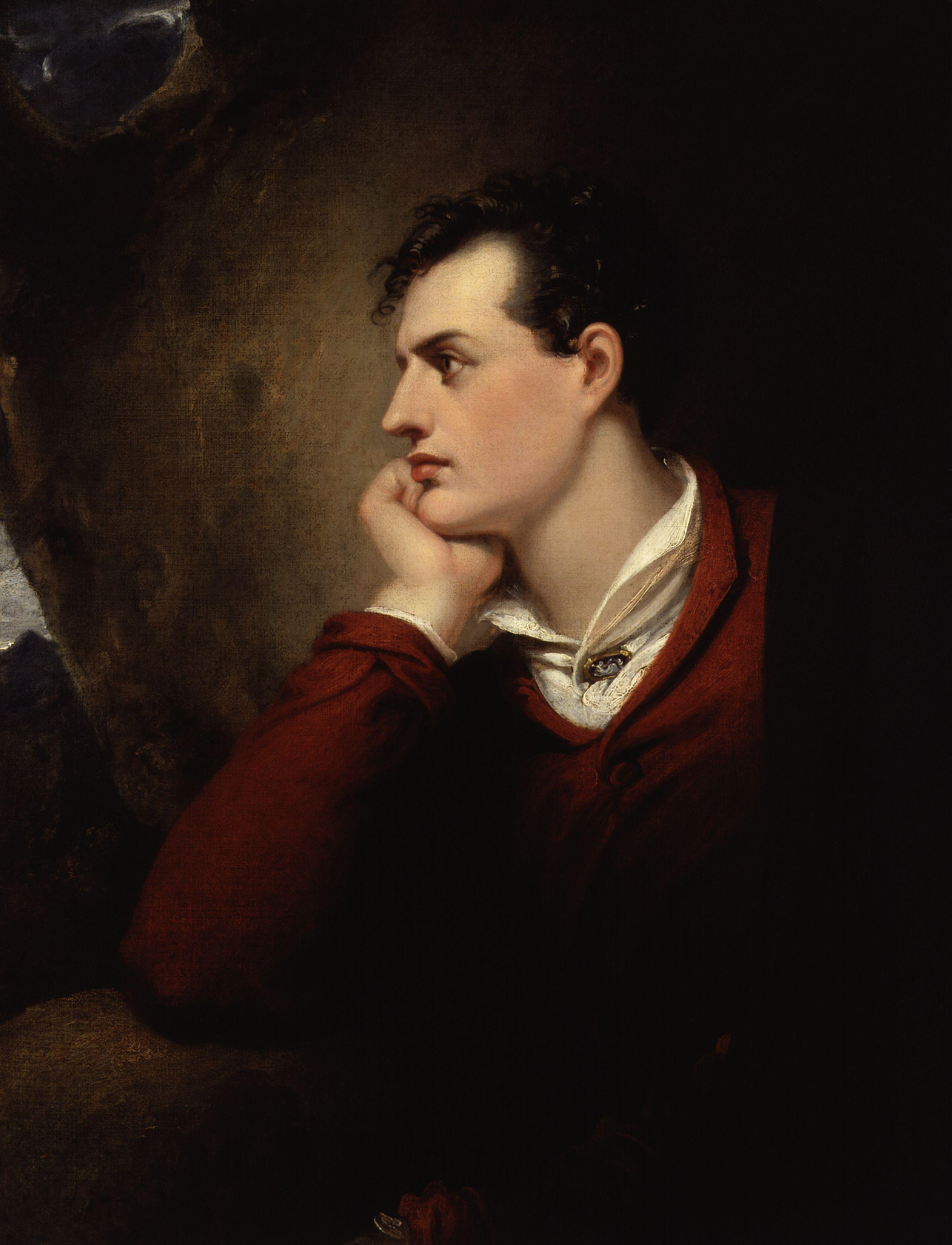
Portrait of Byron by Richard Westall

After the publication of the first two cantos of Childe Harold's Pilgrimage (1812), Byron became a celebrity. "He rapidly became the most brilliant star in the dazzling world of Regency London. He was sought after at every society venue, elected to several exclusive clubs, and frequented the most fashionable London drawing-rooms." During this period in England he produced many works, including The Giaour, The Bride of Abydos (1813), Parisina, and The Siege of Corinth (1815).

On the initiative of the composer Isaac Nathan, he produced in 1814–1815 the Hebrew Melodies, including what became some of his best-known lyrics, such as "She Walks in Beauty" and "The Destruction of Sennacherib". Involved at first in an affair with Lady Caroline Lamb (who called him "mad, bad and dangerous to know") and with other lovers and also pressed by debt, he began to seek a suitable marriage, considering – amongst others – Annabella Millbanke. However, in 1813 he met for the first time in four years his half-sister, Augusta Leigh. Rumours of incest surrounded the pair; Augusta's daughter Medora (b. 1814) was suspected to have been Byron's child.

To escape from growing debts and rumours, Byron pressed in his determination to marry Annabella, who was said to be the likely heiress of a rich uncle. They married on 2 January 1815, and their daughter, Ada, was born in December of that year. However, Byron's continuing obsession with Augusta Leigh, and his continuing sexual escapades with actresses such as Charlotte Mardyn and others made their marital life a misery. Annabella considered Byron insane, and in January 1816 she left him, taking their daughter, and began proceedings for a legal separation. Their separation was made legal in a private settlement in March 1816. The scandal of the separation, the rumours about Augusta, and ever-increasing debts forced him to leave England in April 1816, never to return.

== Life abroad (1816–1824) ==
=== Switzerland and the Shelleys ===
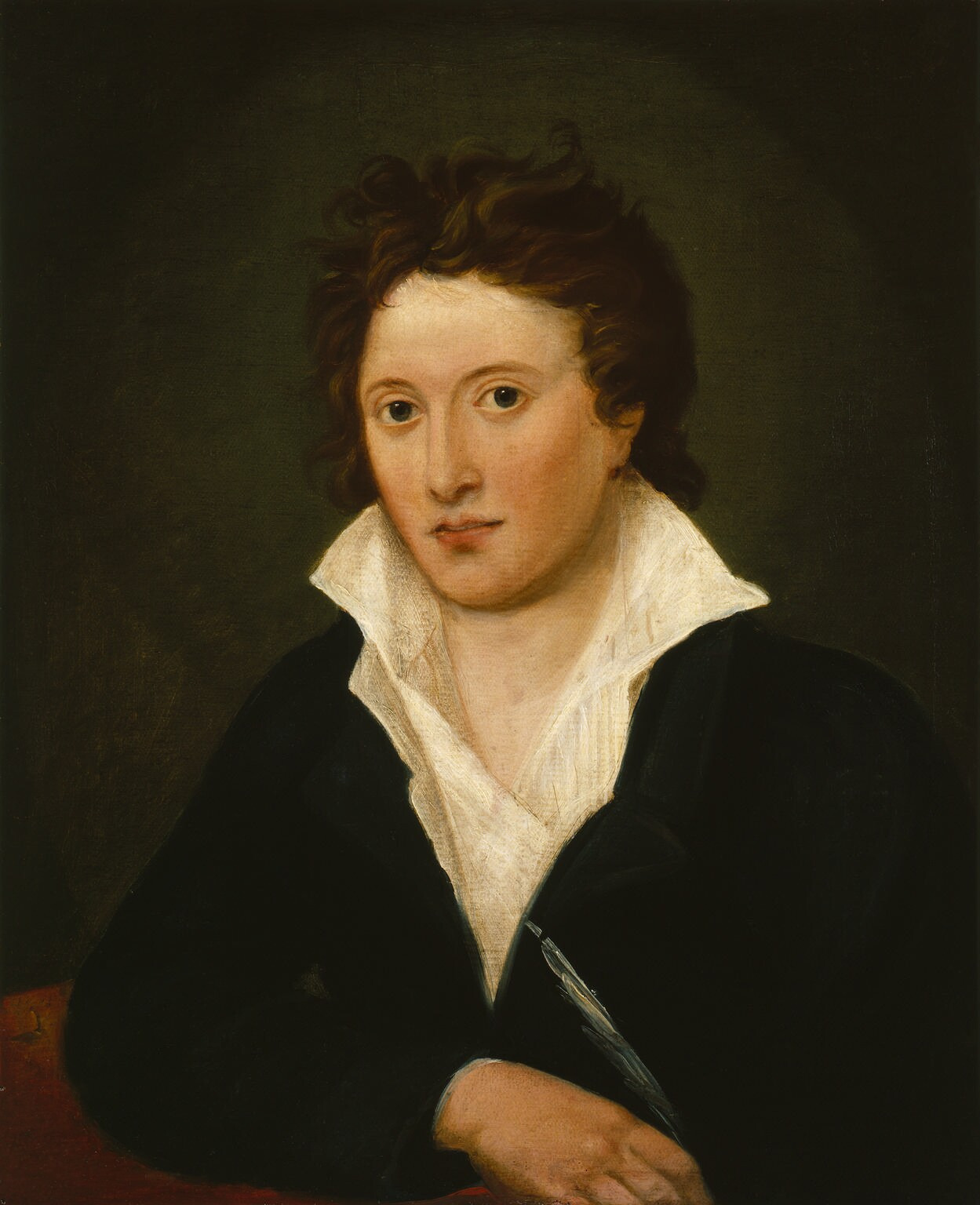
Percy Bysshe Shelley, 1819

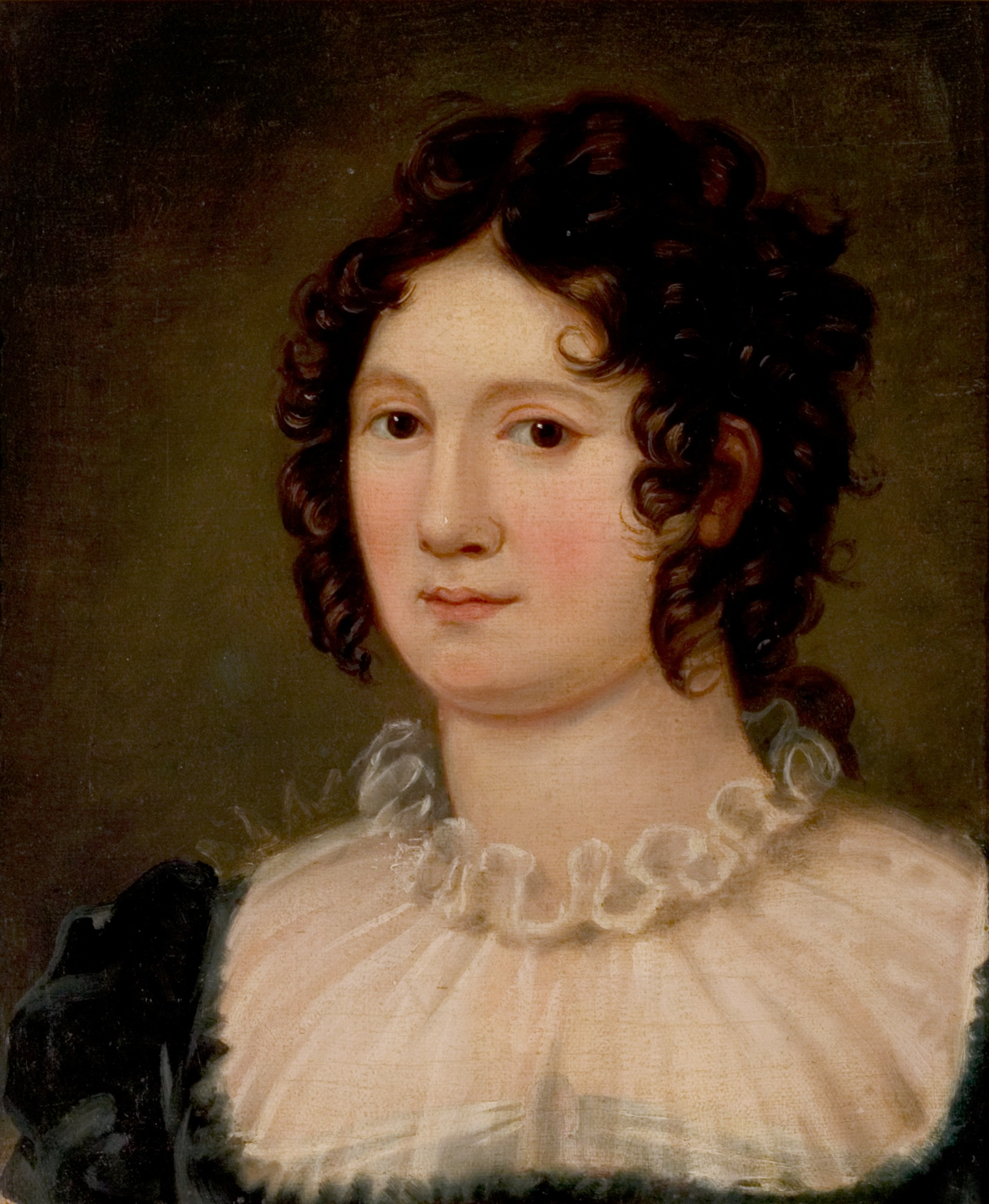
Claire Clairmont, 1819

Mary Shelley, 1840

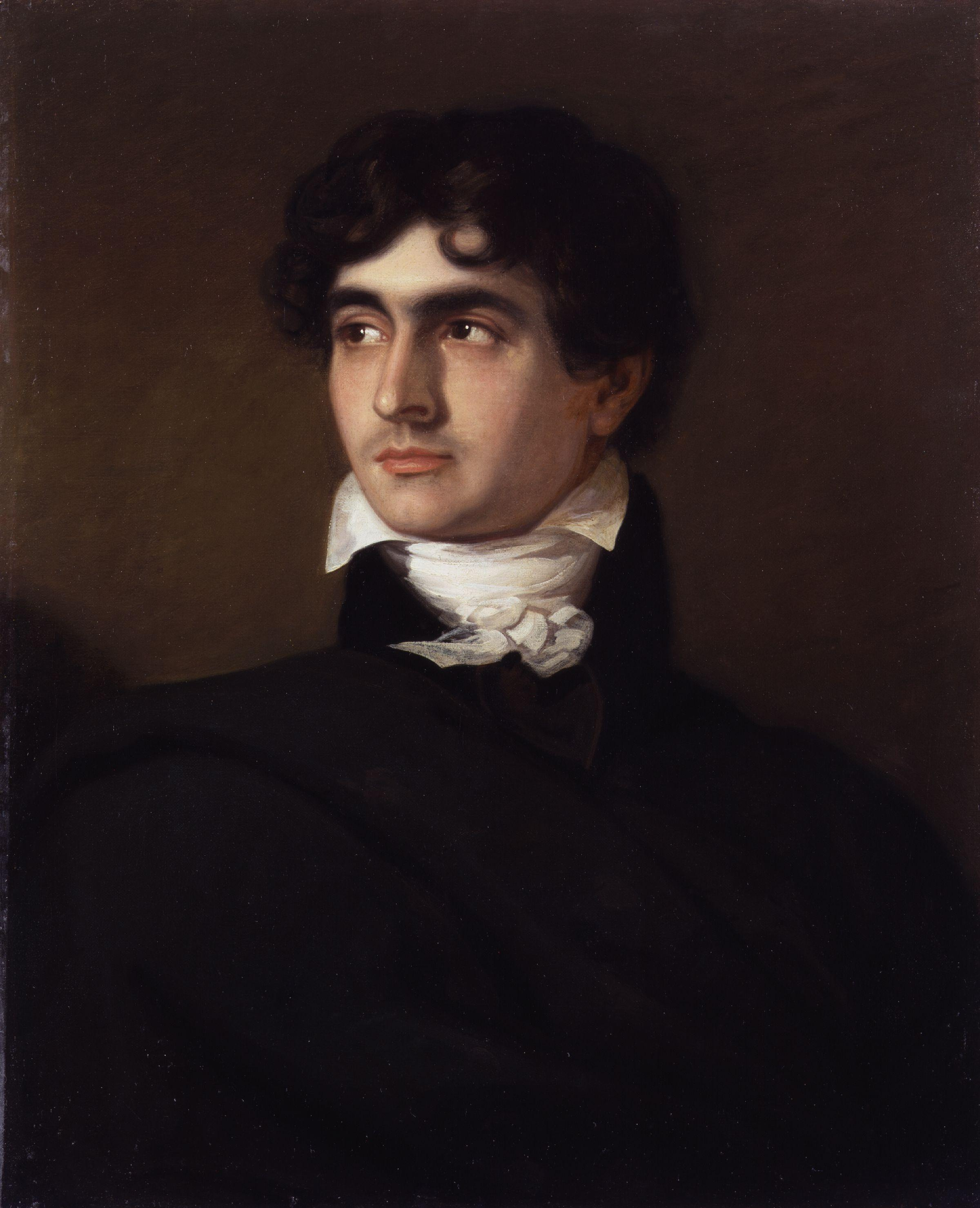
John Polidori, 1816

After this break-up of his domestic life, and by pressure on the part of his creditors, which led to the sale of his library, Byron left England, and never returned. Despite his dying wishes, his body was returned for burial in England. He journeyed through Belgium and continued up the Rhine river. In the summer of 1816 he settled at the Villa Diodati by Lake Geneva, Switzerland, with his personal physician, John William Polidori.

There Byron befriended the poet Percy Bysshe Shelley and author Mary Godwin, Shelley's future wife. He was also joined by Mary's stepsister, Claire Clairmont, with whom he had had an affair in London, which subsequently resulted in the birth of their illegitimate child Allegra, who died at the age of 5 under the care of Byron later in life. Several times Byron went to see Germaine de Staël and her Coppet group, which turned out to be a valid intellectual and emotional support to Byron at the time.

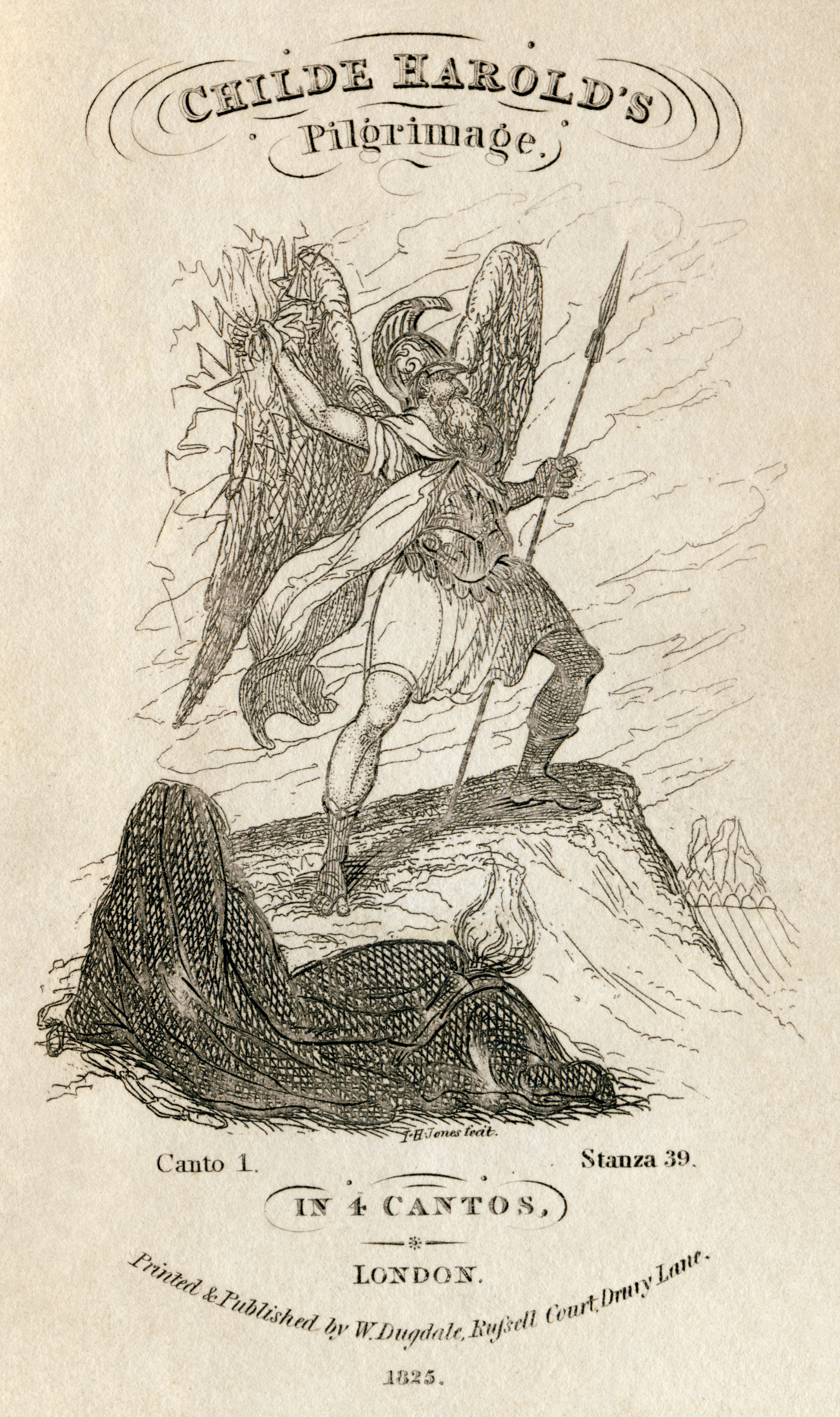
Frontispiece to a c. 1825 edition of Childe Harold's Pilgrimage

Kept indoors at the Villa Diodati by the "incessant rain" of "that wet, ungenial summer" over three days in June, the five turned to reading fantastical stories, including Fantasmagoriana, and then devising their own tales. Mary Shelley produced what would become Frankenstein, or The Modern Prometheus, and Polidori produced The Vampyre, the progenitor of the Romantic vampire genre. The Vampyre was inspired by a fragmentary story of Byron, "A Fragment".

Byron's story fragment was published as a postscript to Mazeppa; he also wrote the third canto of Childe Harold.

=== Italy ===
Byron wintered in Venice, pausing in his travels when he fell in love with Marianna Segati, in whose Venice house he was lodging, and who was soon replaced by 22-year-old Margherita Cogni; both women were married. Cogni could not read or write, and she left her husband to move in with Byron. Their fighting often caused Byron to spend the night in his gondola; when he asked her to leave the house, she threw herself into the Venetian canal.

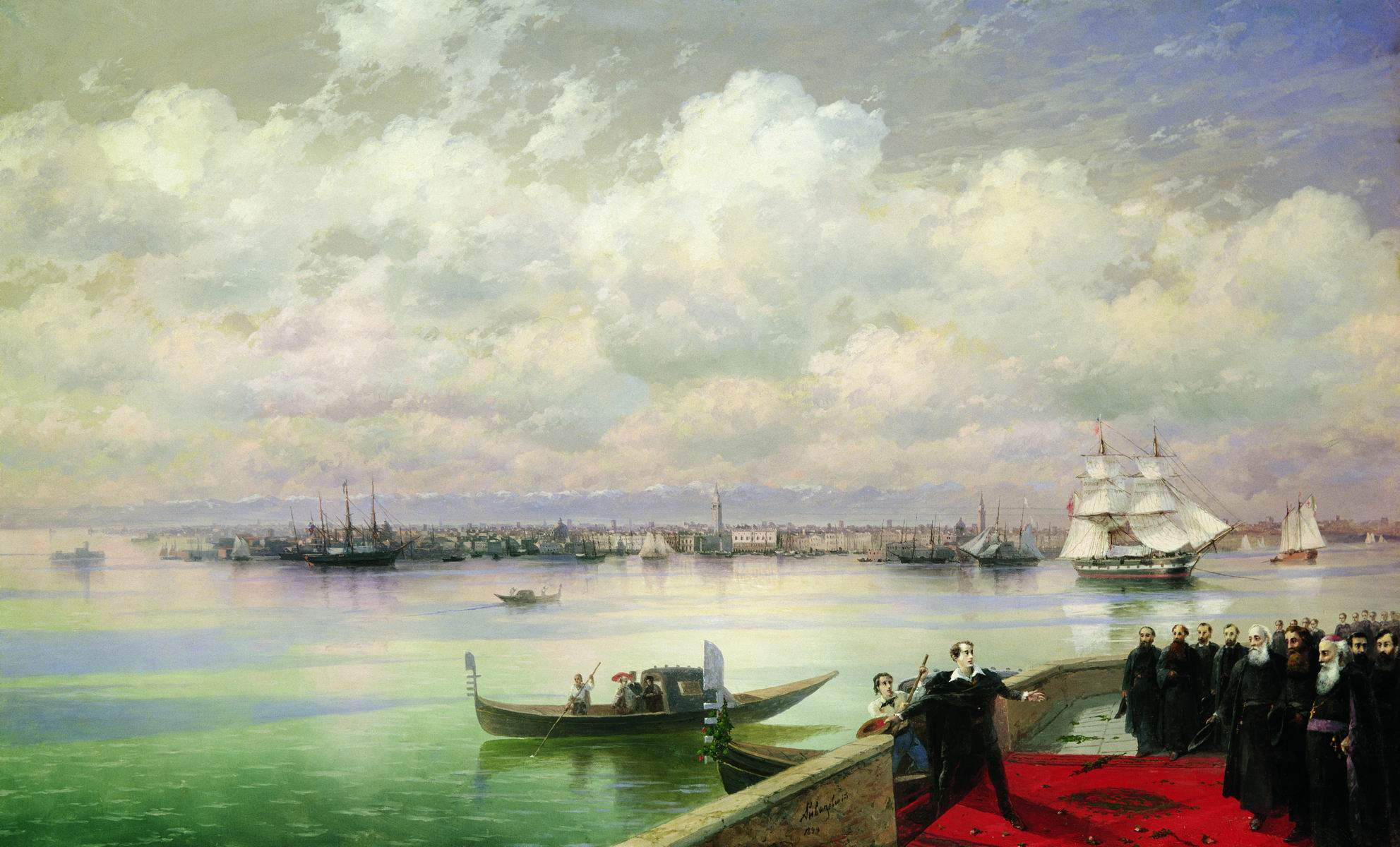
Byron's visit to San Lazzaro degli Armeni as depicted in Ivan Aivazovsky's 1899 portrait

In 1816 Byron visited San Lazzaro degli Armeni in Venice, where he acquainted himself with Armenian culture with the help of the monks belonging to the Mechitarist Order. With the help of Father Pascal Aucher (Harutiun Avkerian), he learned the Armenian language and attended many seminars about language and history. In 1817, he co-authored Grammar English and Armenian, an English textbook written by Aucher and corrected by Byron, and A Grammar Armenian and English in 1819, a project he initiated of a grammar of Classical Armenian for English-speakers, where he included quotations from classical and modern Armenian.

Byron later helped to compile the English Armenian Dictionary (Barraran angleren yev hayeren, 1821) and wrote the preface, in which he explained Armenian oppression by the Turkish pashas and the Persian satraps and the Armenian struggle of liberation. His two main translations are the Epistle of Paul to the Corinthians, two chapters of Movses Khorenatsi's History of Armenia, and sections of Nerses of Lambron's Orations. He also translated into English those sections of the Armenian Bible that are not present in the English Bible. His fascination was so great that he even considered using the Armenian version of the story of Cain for his play of the same name. Byron's interest in Armenian studies contributed to the spread and development of that discipline. His profound lyricism and ideological courage have inspired many Armenian poets, the likes of Ghevond Alishan, Smbat Shahaziz, Hovhannes Tumanyan, Ruben Vorberian, and others.

In 1817, he journeyed to Rome. On returning to Venice, he wrote the fourth canto of Childe Harold. About the same time, he sold Newstead Abbey and published Manfred, Cain, and The Deformed Transformed. The first five cantos of Don Juan were written between 1818 and 1820. During this period he met the 21-year-old Countess Guiccioli, who found her first love in Byron; he asked her to elope with him. After considering migrating to Venezuela or to the Cape Colony, Byron finally decided to leave Venice for Ravenna.

Because of his love for the local aristocratic, young, newly married Teresa Guiccioli, Byron lived in Ravenna from 1819 to 1821. Here he continued Don Juan and wrote the Ravenna Diary and My Dictionary and Recollections. Around this time he received visits from Percy Bysshe Shelley, as well as from Thomas Moore, to whom he confided his autobiography or "life and adventures", which Moore, Hobhouse, and Byron's publisher, John Murray, burnt in 1824, a month after Byron's death. Of Byron's lifestyle in Ravenna more is known from Shelley, who documented some of its more colourful aspects in a letter:

Lord Byron gets up at two. I get up, quite contrary to my usual custom ... at 12. After breakfast we sit talking till six. From six to eight we gallop through the pine forest which divide Ravenna from the sea; we then come home and dine, and sit up gossiping till six in the morning. I don't suppose this will kill me in a week or fortnight, but I shall not try it longer. Lord B.'s establishment consists, besides servants, of ten horses, eight enormous dogs, three monkeys, five cats, an eagle, a crow, and a falcon; and all these, except the horses, walk about the house, which every now and then resounds with their unarbitrated quarrels, as if they were the masters of it... . [P.S.] I find that my enumeration of the animals in this Circean Palace was defective ... . I have just met on the grand staircase five peacocks, two guinea hens, and an Egyptian crane. I wonder who all these animals were before they were changed into these shapes.

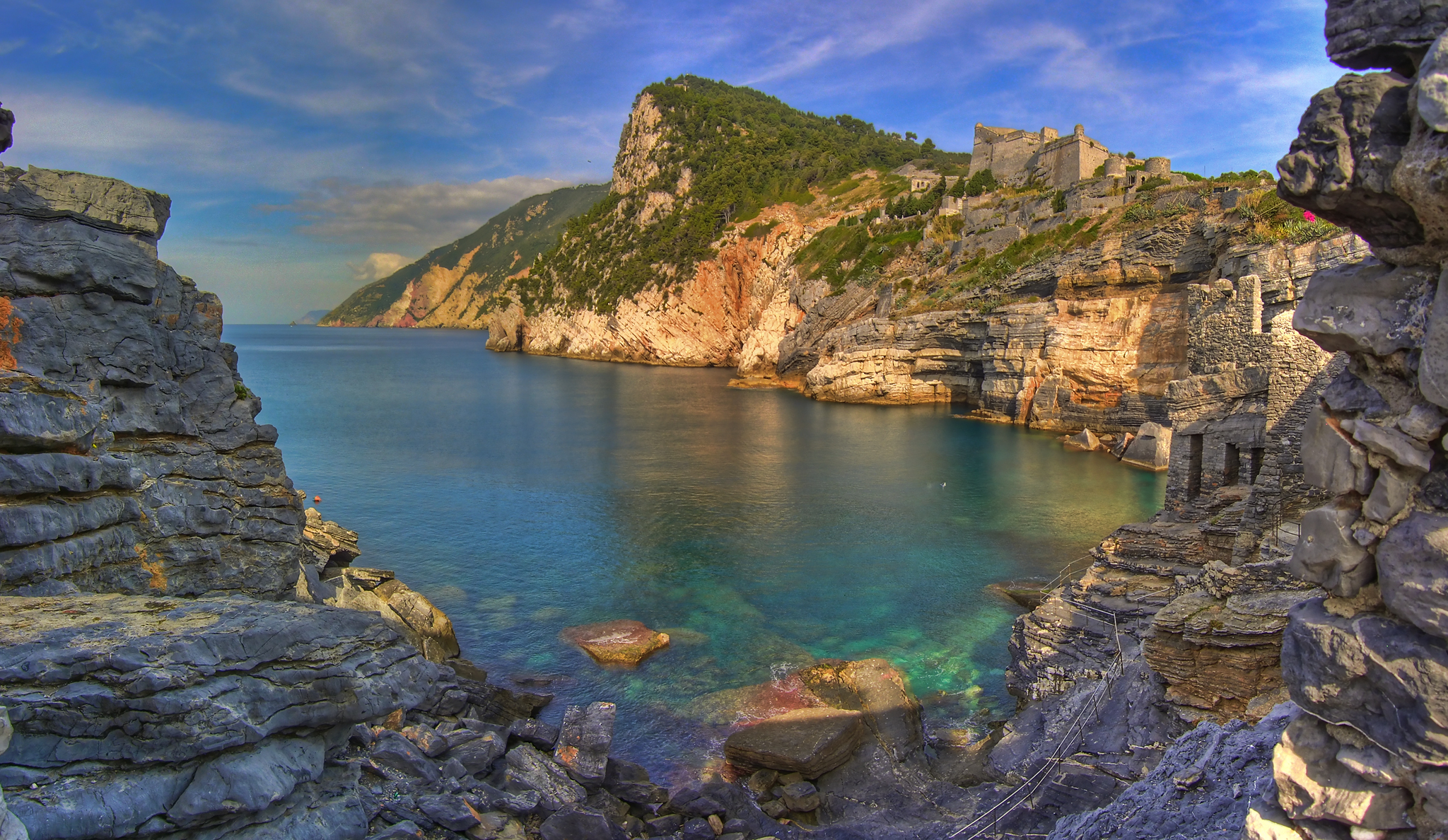
"Byron's Grotto" in Porto Venere, Italy, named in Byron's honour because, according to local legend, he meditated here and drew inspiration from this place for his literary works

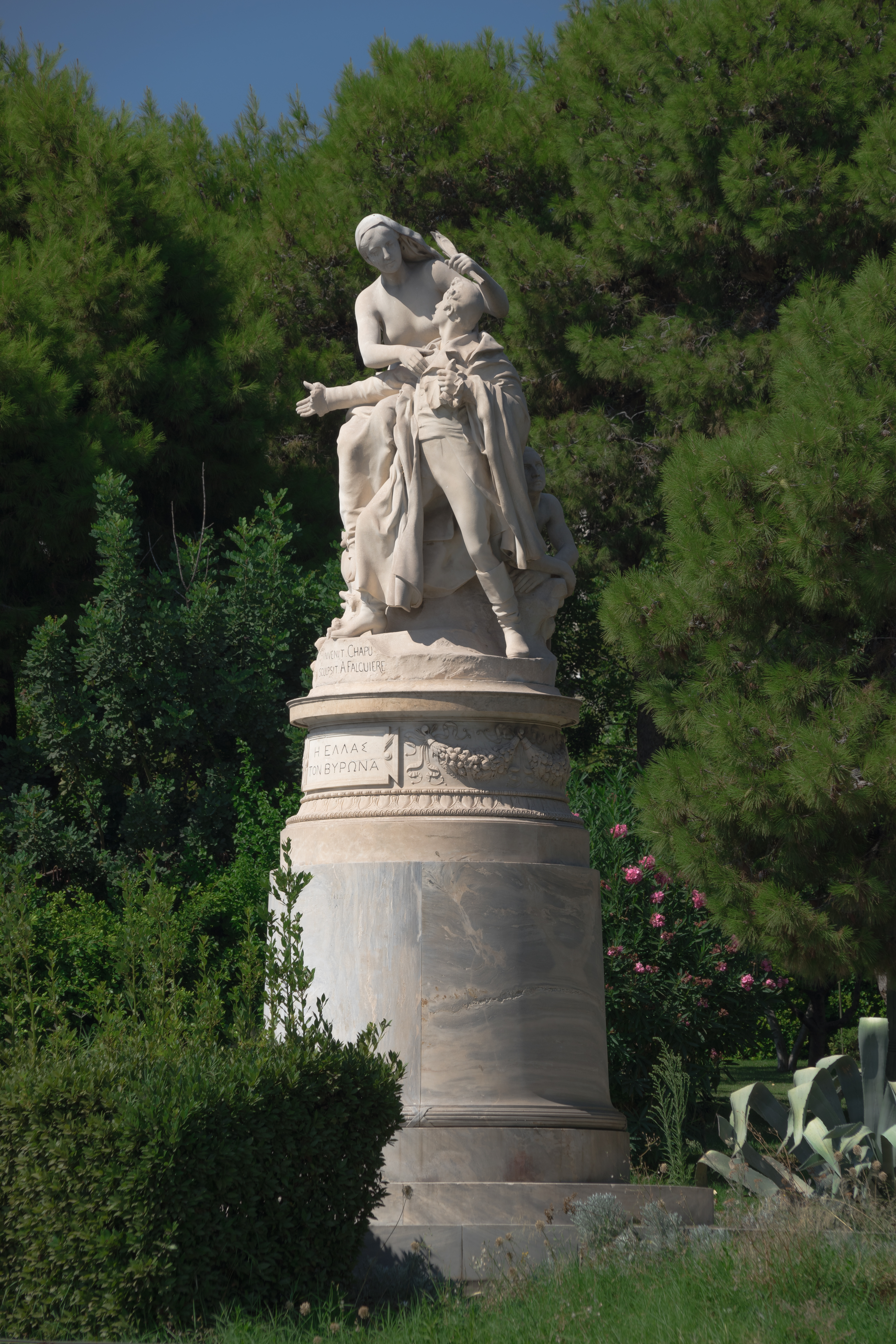
Α 19th-century sculptural composition by Henri-Michel Chapu and Alexandre Falguière depicting Greece in the form of a female figure crowning Lord Byron in the National Park in Athens (Άγαλμα Λόρδου Βύρωνος)

In 1821, Byron left Ravenna and went to live in the Tuscan city of Pisa, to which Teresa had also relocated. From 1821 to 1822 Byron finished Cantos 6–12 of Don Juan at Pisa, and in the same year he joined Leigh Hunt and Shelley in starting a short-lived newspaper, The Liberal, in whose first number The Vision of Judgment appeared. For the first time since his arrival in Italy, Byron found himself tempted to give dinner parties; his guests included the Shelleys, Edward Ellerker Williams, Thomas Medwin, John Taaffe, and Edward John Trelawny; and "never", as Shelley said, "did he display himself to more advantage than on these occasions; being at once polite and cordial, full of social hilarity and the most perfect good humour; never diverging into ungraceful merriment, and yet keeping up the spirit of liveliness throughout the evening."

Shelley and Williams rented a house on the coast and had a schooner built. Byron decided to have his own yacht, and engaged Trelawny's friend Captain Daniel Roberts to design and construct the boat. Named the Bolivar, it was later sold to Charles John Gardiner, 1st Earl of Blessington, and Marguerite, Countess of Blessington, when Byron left for Greece in 1823.

Byron attended the beachside cremation of Shelley, which was orchestrated by Trelawny after Williams and Shelley drowned in a boating accident on 8 July 1822. His last Italian home was in Genoa, where he stayed at Villa Saluzzo Bombrini. On 29 September he challenged Edward John Trelawny to swim, from Bolivar to San Terenzo and back. The poet lost, partly due to illness, and was forced to stay four days in a hovel in Lerici suffering from all kinds of pain. While living in Genoa he was accompanied by the Countess Guiccioli and the Blessingtons. Lady Blessington based much of the material in her book, Conversations with Lord Byron, on the time spent together there. This book became an important biographical text about Byron's life just prior to his death.

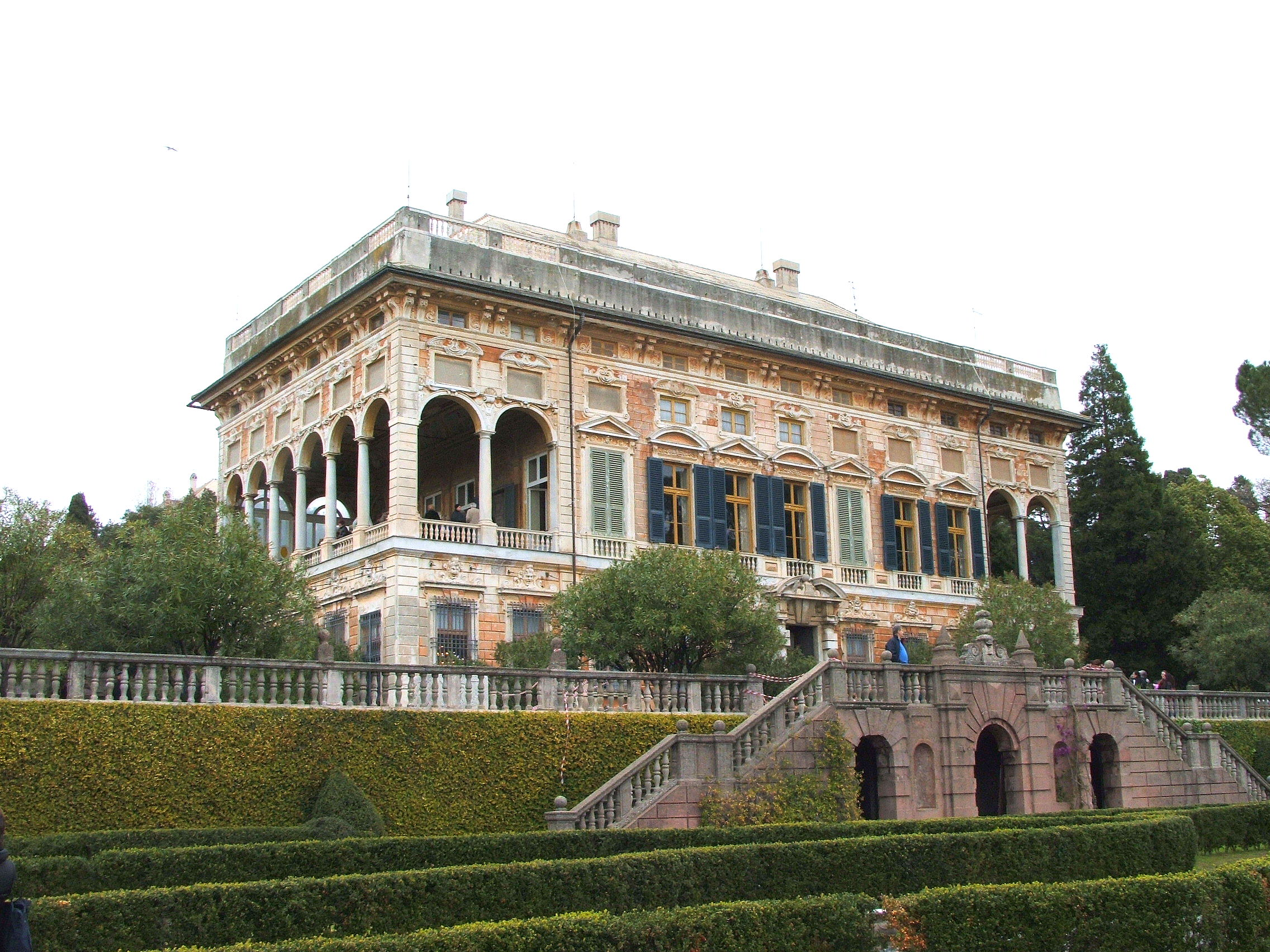
Villa Saluzzo Bombrini, Lord Byron's Genoese residence

=== Ottoman Greece ===
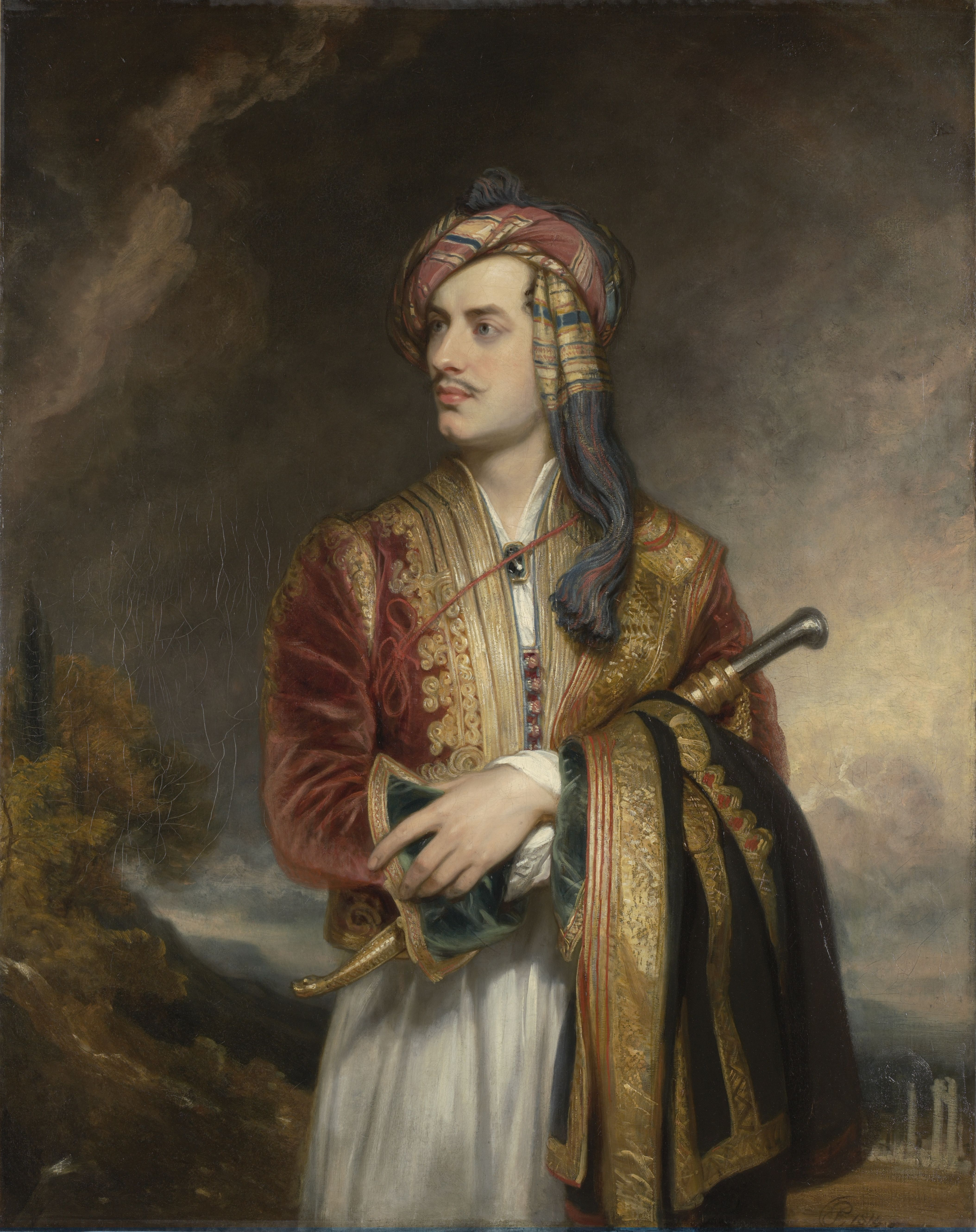
Lord Byron in Albanian Dress by Thomas Phillips, 1813. Venizelos Mansion, Athens (the British Ambassador's residence).

Byron was living in Genoa in 1823 when, growing bored with his life there, he accepted overtures for his support from representatives of the Greek independence movement from the Ottoman Empire. At first, Byron did not wish to leave his 22-year-old mistress, Countess Teresa Guiccioli, who had abandoned her husband to live with him. But ultimately Guiccioli's father, Count Gamba, was allowed to leave his exile in the Romagna under the condition that his daughter return to him, without Byron. At the same time that the philhellene, Edward Blaquiere, was attempting to recruit him, Byron was confused as to what he was supposed to do in Greece, writing: "Blaquiere seemed to think that I might be of some use—even here;—though what he did not exactly specify".

With the assistance of his banker and Captain Daniel Roberts, Byron chartered the brig Hercules to take him to Greece. When Byron left Genoa, it caused "passionate grief" from Guiccioli, who wept openly as he sailed away. The Hercules was forced to return to port shortly afterwards. When it set sail for the final time, Guiccioli had already left Genoa. On 16 July, Byron left Genoa, arriving at Kefalonia in the Ionian Islands on 4 August.

His voyage is covered in detail in Donald Prell's Sailing with Byron from Genoa to Cephalonia. Prell also wrote of a coincidence in Byron's chartering the Hercules. The vessel was launched only a few miles south of Seaham Hall, where in 1815 Byron had married Annabella Milbanke. Between 1815 and 1823 the vessel was in service between England and Canada. Suddenly in 1823, the ship's Captain decided to sail to Genoa and offer the Hercules for charter. After taking Byron to Greece, the ship returned to England, never again to venture into the Mediterranean.

Byron initially stayed on the island of Kefalonia, where he was besieged by agents of the rival Greek factions, all of whom wanted to recruit Byron for their own cause. The Ionian islands, of which Kefalonia is one, were under British rule until 1864. Byron spent £4,000 (equivalent to £319,890 in 2023) of his own money to refit the Greek fleet. When Byron travelled to the mainland of Greece on the night of 28 December 1823, Byron's ship was surprised by an Ottoman warship, which did not attack his ship, as the Ottoman captain mistook Byron's boat for a fireship. To avoid the Ottoman Navy, which he encountered several times on his voyage, Byron was forced to take a roundabout route and only reached Missolonghi on 5 January 1824.

After arriving in Missolonghi, Byron joined forces with Alexandros Mavrokordatos, a Greek politician with military power. Byron moved to the second floor of a two-story house and was forced to spend much of his time dealing with unruly Souliotes who demanded that Byron pay them the back-pay owed to them by the Greek government. Byron gave the Souliotes some £6,000. Byron was supposed to lead an attack on the Ottoman fortress of Navpaktos, whose Albanian garrison were unhappy due to arrears in pay, and who offered to put up only token resistance if Byron was willing to bribe them into surrendering.

However, Ottoman commander Yussuf Pasha executed the mutinous Albanian officers who were offering to surrender Navpaktos to Byron and arranged to have some of the arrears paid out to the rest of the garrison. Byron never led the attack on Navpaktos because the Souliotes kept demanding that Byron pay them more and more money before they would march. Byron grew tired of their blackmail and sent them all home on 15 February 1824. Byron wrote in a note to himself:

"Having tried in vain at every expense, considerable trouble—and some danger to unite the Suliotes for the good of Greece—and their own—I have come to the following resolution—I will have nothing more to do with the Suliotes—they may go to the Turks or the devil...they may cut me into more pieces than they have dissensions among them, sooner than change my resolution".

At the same time, Guiccioli's brother, Pietro Gamba, who had followed Byron to Greece, exasperated Byron with his incompetence as he continually made expensive mistakes. For example, when asked to buy some cloth from Corfu, Gamba ordered the wrong cloth in excess, causing the bill to be 10 times higher than what Byron wanted. Byron wrote about his right-hand man: "Gamba—who is anything but lucky—had something to do with it—and as usual—the moment he had—matters went wrong".

The reception of Lord Byron at Missolonghi

To help raise money for the revolution, Byron sold his estate in England, Rochdale Manor, which raised some £11,250. This led Byron to estimate that he now had some £20,000 (equivalent to £1,816,851 in 2023) at his disposal, all of which he planned to spend on the Greek cause. In today's money, Byron would have been a millionaire many times over. News that a fabulously wealthy British aristocrat, known for his financial generosity, had arrived in Greece made Byron the object of much solicitation in that desperately poor country.

Byron wrote to his business agent in England, "I should not like to give the Greeks but a half helping hand", saying he would have wanted to spend his entire fortune on Greek freedom. Byron found himself besieged by various people, both Greek and foreign, who tried to persuade him to open his pocketbook for support. By the end of March 1824, the so-called "Byron brigade" of 30 philhellene officers and exactly 231 men had been formed, paid for entirely by Byron. Leadership of the Greek cause in the Roumeli region was divided between two rival leaders: a former Klepht (bandit), Odysseas Androutsos; and a wealthy Phanariot Prince, Alexandros Mavrokordatos. Byron used his prestige to attempt to persuade the two rival leaders to come together to focus on defeating the Ottomans.

At the same time, other leaders of the Greek factions like Petrobey Mavromichalis and Theodoros Kolokotronis wrote letters to Byron telling him to disregard all of the Roumeliot leaders and to come to their respective areas in the Peloponnese. This drove Byron to distraction; he complained that the Greeks were hopelessly disunited and spent more time feuding with each other than trying to win independence. Byron's friend Edward John Trelawny had aligned himself with Androutsos, who ruled Athens, and was now pressing for Byron to break with Mavrokordatos in favour of backing the rival Androutsos.

Androutsos, having won over Trelawny to his cause, was now anxious to persuade Byron to put his wealth behind his claim to be the leader of Greece. Byron wrote with disgust about how one of the Greek captains, former Klepht Georgios Karaiskakis, attacked Missolonghi on 3 April 1824 with some 150 men supported by the Souliotes as he was unhappy with Mavrokordatos's leadership, which led to a brief bout of inter-Greek fighting before Karaiskakis was chased away by 6 April.

When the famous Danish sculptor Bertel Thorvaldsen heard about Byron's heroics in Greece, he voluntarily resculpted his earlier bust of Byron in Greek marble.

== Death ==
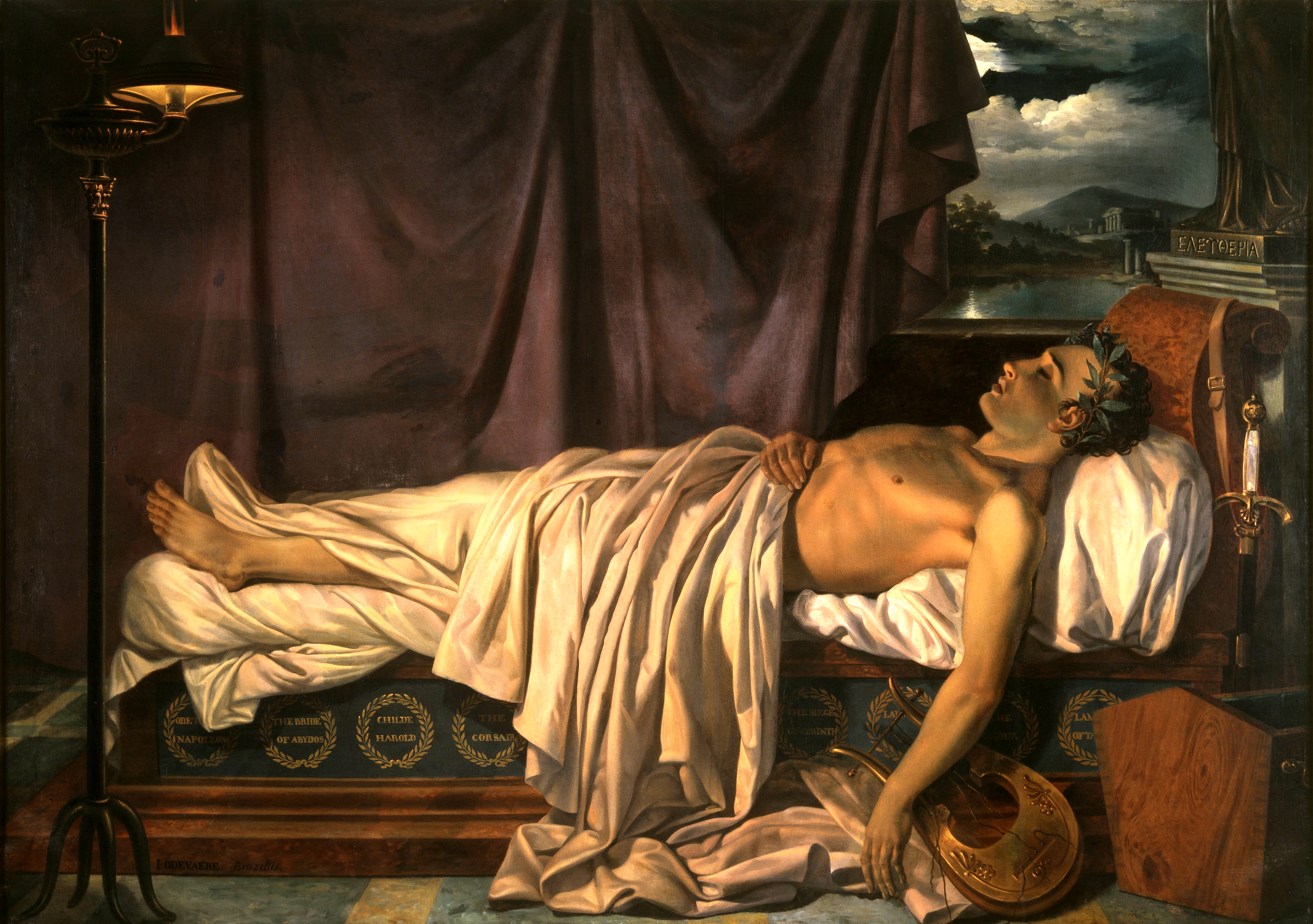
Lord Byron on His Deathbed, by Joseph Denis Odevaere (c. 1826). The sheet covers Byron's misshapen right foot.

Mavrokordatos and Byron planned to attack the Turkish-held fortress of Lepanto, at the mouth of the Gulf of Corinth. Byron employed a fire master to prepare artillery, and he took part of the rebel army under his own command despite his lack of military experience. Before the expedition could sail, on 15 February 1824, he fell ill, and bloodletting weakened him further. He made a partial recovery, but in early April he caught a cold; the therapeutic bleeding insisted on by his doctors exacerbated it. He contracted a fever and died in Missolonghi on 19 April.

His physician at the time, Julius van Millingen, son of the British archaeologist James Millingen, was unable to prevent his death. It has been said that if Byron had lived and had gone on to defeat the Ottomans, he might have been declared King of Greece. However, modern scholars have found such an outcome unlikely. The British historian David Brewer wrote that in one sense, Byron failed to persuade the rival Greek factions to unite, won no victories and was successful only in the humanitarian sphere, using his great wealth to help the victims of the war, Christian and Muslim, but this did not affect the outcome of the Greek war of independence.

Brewer went on to argue:

"In another sense, though, Byron achieved everything he could have wished. His presence in Greece, and in particular his death there, drew to the Greek cause not just the attention of sympathetic nations, but their increasing active participation ... Despite the critics, Byron is primarily remembered with admiration as a poet of genius, with something approaching veneration as a symbol of high ideals, and with great affection as a man: for his courage and his ironic slant on life, for his generosity to the grandest of causes and to the humblest of individuals, for the constant interplay of judgment and sympathy. In Greece, he is still revered as no other foreigner, and as very few Greeks are, and like a Homeric hero he is accorded an honorific standard epithet, megalos kai kalos, a great and good man."

=== Post mortem ===
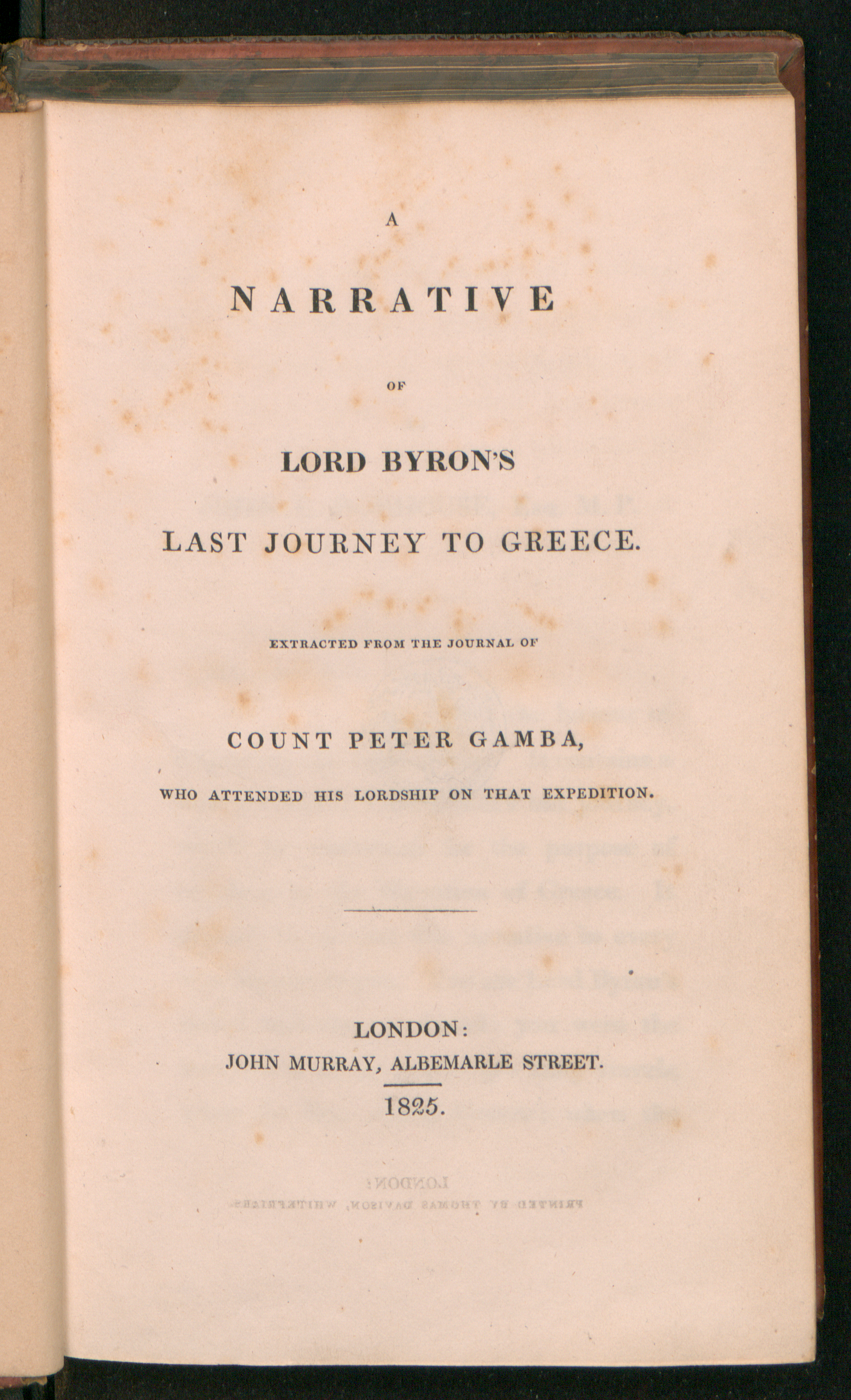
A Narrative of Lord Byron's Last Journey to Greece by Pietro Gamba (1825)

Alfred Tennyson would later recall the shocked reaction in Britain when word was received of Byron's death. The Greeks mourned Lord Byron deeply, and he became a hero. The national poet of Greece, Dionysios Solomos, wrote a poem about the unexpected loss, named To the Death of Lord Byron. A suburb of Athens was named Vyronas in his honour.

Byron's body was embalmed, but the Greeks wanted some part of their hero to stay with them. According to some sources, his heart remained at Missolonghi. His other remains were sent to England, accompanied by his faithful manservant, "Tita", for burial in Westminster Abbey, but the Abbey refused for reason of "questionable morality". Huge crowds viewed his coffin as he lay in state for two days at number 25 Great George Street, Westminster. He is buried at the Church of St Mary Magdalene in Hucknall, Nottinghamshire. A marble slab given by the King of Greece is laid directly above Byron's grave. His daughter Ada Lovelace was later buried beside him.

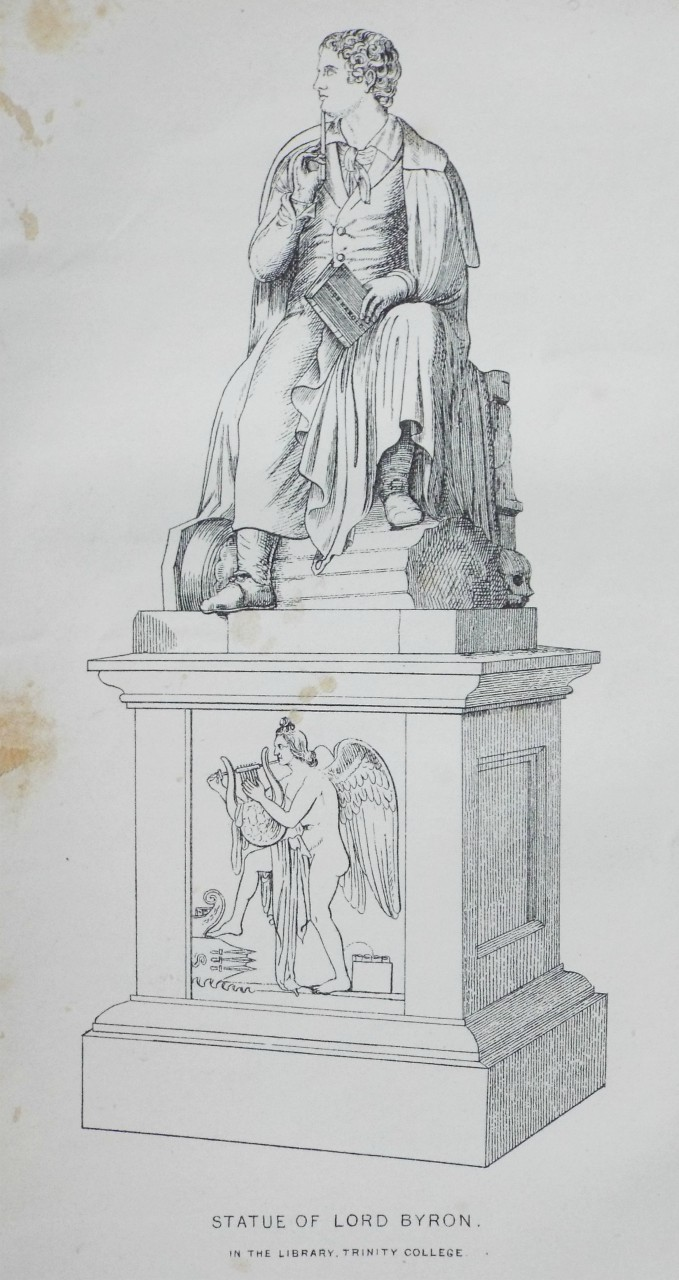
A lithograph of Lord Byron's statue found in Trinity College

Byron's friends raised £1,000 to commission a statue of him. Thorvaldsen offered to sculpt it for that amount. After the statue was completed in 1834, for ten years, British institutions turned it down and it remained in storage. It was refused by the British Museum, St. Paul's Cathedral, Westminster Abbey and the National Gallery before Trinity College, Cambridge placed the statue of Byron in its library.

In 1969, 145 years after Byron's death, a memorial to him was placed in Westminster Abbey. The memorial had been lobbied for since 1907, when The New York Times wrote:

"People are beginning to ask whether this ignoring of Byron is not a thing of which England should be ashamed ... a bust or a tablet might be put in the Poets' Corner and England be relieved of ingratitude toward one of her really great sons."

Robert Ripley had drawn a picture of Boatswain's grave with the caption "Lord Byron's dog has a magnificent tomb while Lord Byron himself has none". This came as a shock to the English, particularly schoolchildren, who, Ripley said, raised funds of their own accord to provide the poet with a suitable memorial.

Close to the centre of Athens, Greece, outside the National Garden, is a statue depicting Greece in the form of a woman crowning Byron. The statue is by the French sculptors Henri-Michel Chapu and Alexandre Falguière. In 2008, The Hellenic Parliament designated 19 April, the anniversary of Byron's death, as the "Day of Philhellenism and International Solidarity".

Upon his death, the barony passed to Byron's cousin George Anson Byron, a career naval officer.

== Personal life ==
=== Relationships and scandals ===
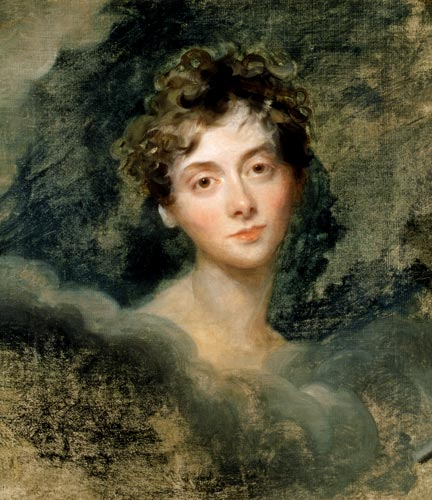
Lady Caroline Lamb

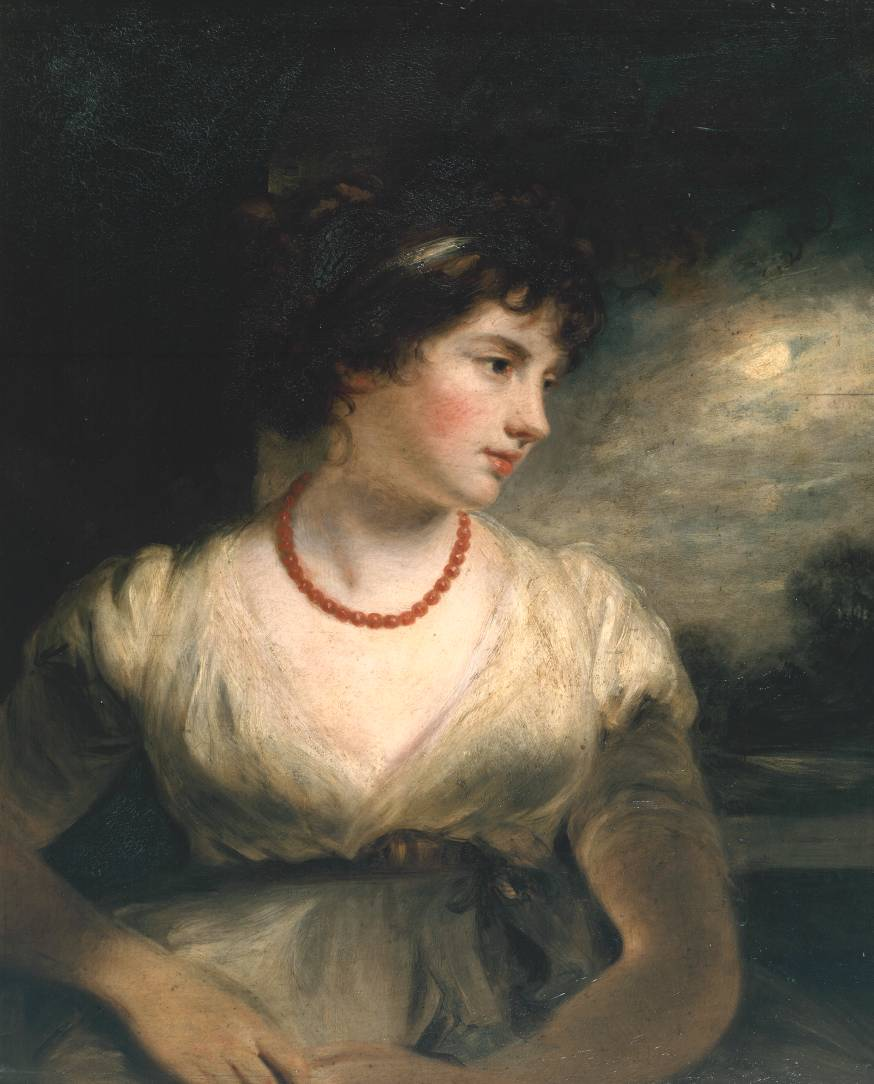
Jane Elizabeth Scott "Lady Oxford"

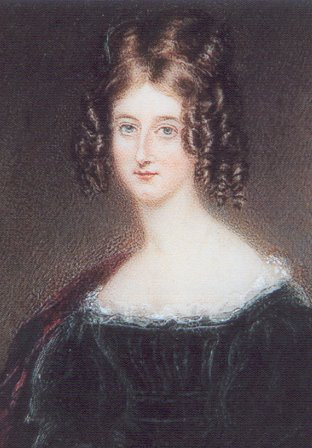
Augusta Leigh

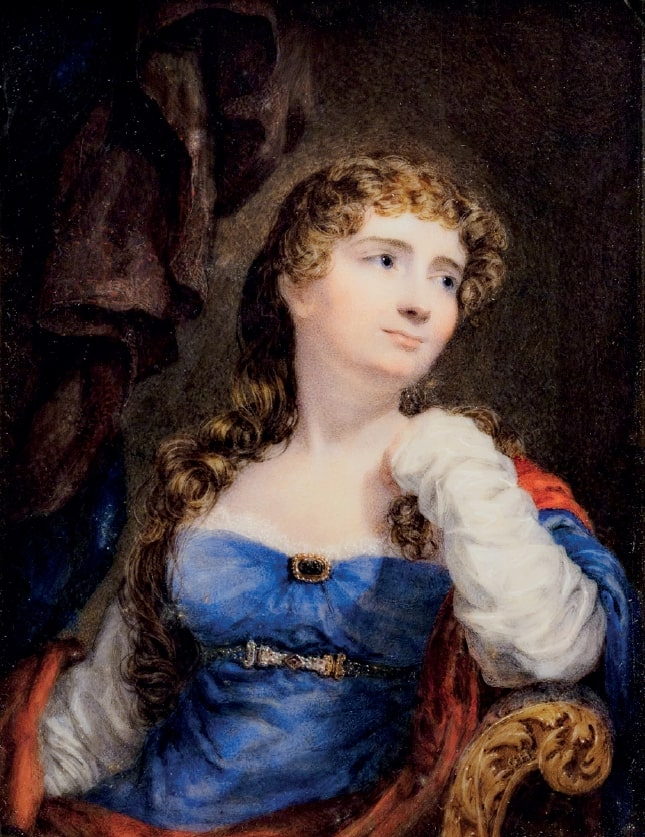
Anne Isabella Milbanke in 1812 by Charles Hayter

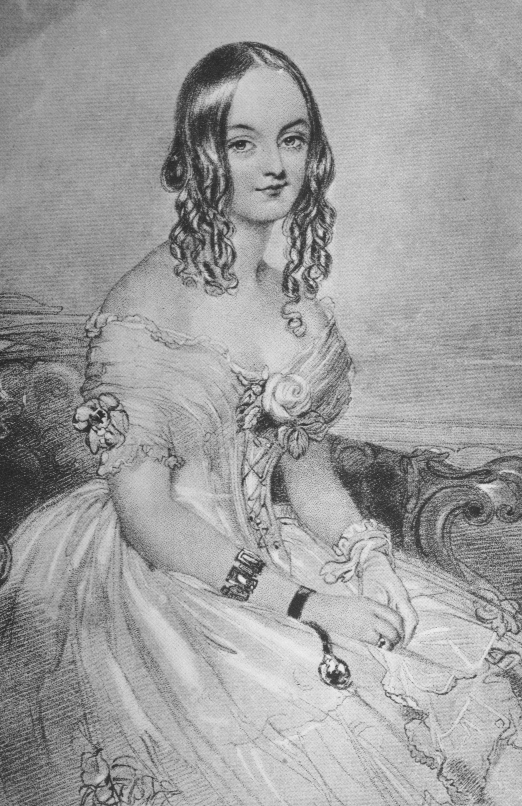
Teresa, Contessa Guiccioli

In 1812, Byron embarked on a well-publicised affair with the married Lady Caroline Lamb that shocked the British public. She had spurned the attention of the poet on their first meeting, giving Byron what became his lasting epitaph when she famously described him as "mad, bad, and dangerous to know". This did not prevent her from pursuing him.

Byron eventually broke off the relationship and moved swiftly on to others, such as Lady Oxford, but Lamb never entirely recovered, pursuing him even after he tired of her. She was emotionally disturbed and lost so much weight that Byron sarcastically commented to her mother-in-law, his friend Lady Melbourne, that he was "haunted by a skeleton".

She began to stalk him, calling on him at home, sometimes dressed in disguise as a pageboy, at a time when such an act could ruin both of them socially. Once, during such a visit, she wrote on a book at his desk, "Remember me!" As a retort, Byron wrote a poem entitled Remember Thee! Remember Thee! which concludes with the line "Thou false to him, thou fiend to me".

As a child, Byron had seen little of his half-sister Augusta Leigh; in adulthood, he formed a close relationship with her that has been interpreted by some as incestuous, and by others as innocent. The biographer of Byron André Maurois who had access to the poet's archive, regarded the fact of incest as proven. Augusta, who was married, gave birth on 15 April 1814 to her third daughter, Elizabeth Medora Leigh, rumoured by some to be Byron's.

Eventually, Byron began to court Lady Caroline's cousin Anne Isabella Milbanke ("Annabella"), who refused his first proposal of marriage, but later accepted him. Milbanke was a highly moral woman, intelligent and mathematically gifted. She was also an heiress. They married at Seaham Hall, County Durham, on 2 January 1815. The marriage proved unhappy. They had a daughter, Augusta Ada.

On 16 January 1816, Lady Byron left her husband, taking Ada with her. That same year on 21 April, Byron signed the Deed of Separation. Rumours of marital violence, adultery with actresses, incest with Augusta Leigh, and sodomy were circulated, assisted by a jealous Lady Caroline. In a letter, Augusta quoted him as saying: "Even to have such a thing said is utter destruction and ruin to a man from which he can never recover." That same year Lady Caroline published her popular novel Glenarvon, in which Lord Byron was portrayed as the seedy title character.

Byron's mother-in-law, Judith Noel, the Hon. Lady Milbanke, died in 1822, and her will required that he change his surname to "Noel" in order to inherit half of her estate. He accordingly obtained a Royal Warrant, enabling him to "take and use the surname of Noel only" and to "subscribe the said surname of Noel before all titles of honour". From that point, he signed himself "Noel Byron", the usual signature of a peer being merely the name of the peerage, in this case simply "Byron". Some have speculated that he did this so that his initials would read "N.B.", mimicking those of his hero, Napoleon. Lady Byron eventually succeeded to the Barony of Wentworth, becoming "Lady Wentworth".

==== Sexuality ====
Byron described his first intense romantic feelings at the age of seven for his distant cousin Mary Duff:

My mother used always to rally me about this childish amour, and at last, many years after, when I was sixteen, she told me one day, 'O Byron, I have had a letter from Edinburgh, and your old sweetheart, Mary Duff, is married to Mr. C***.' And what was my answer? I really cannot explain or account for my feelings at that moment, but they nearly threw me into convulsions... How the deuce did all this occur so early? Where could it originate? I certainly had no sexual ideas for years afterwards; and yet my misery, my love for that girl were so violent, that I sometimes doubt if I have ever been really attached since. Be that as it may, hearing of her marriage several years after was like a thunder-stroke – it nearly choked me – to the horror of my mother and the astonishment and almost incredulity of every body. And it is a phenomenon in my existence (for I was not eight years old) which has puzzled, and will puzzle me to the latest hour of it; and lately, I know not why, the recollection (not the attachment) has recurred as forcibly as ever...But, the more I reflect, the more I am bewildered to assign any cause for this precocity of affection.

Byron also became attached to Margaret Parker, another distant cousin. While his recollection of his love for Mary Duff is that he was ignorant of adult sexuality during this time and was bewildered as to the source of the intensity of his feelings, he would later confess that:

My passions were developed very early – so early, that few would believe me – if I were to state the period – and the facts which accompanied it. Perhaps this was one of the reasons that caused the anticipated melancholy of my thoughts – having anticipated life.

This is the only reference Byron himself makes to the event, and he is ambiguous as to how old he was when it occurred. After his death, his lawyer wrote to a mutual friend telling him a "singular fact" about Byron's life which was "scarcely fit for narration". But he disclosed it nonetheless, thinking it might explain Byron's sexual "propensities":

When nine years old at his mother's house a free Scotch girl [May – sometimes called Mary – Gray, one of his first caretakers] used to come to bed to him and play tricks with his person.

Gray later used this knowledge as a means of ensuring his silence if he were to be tempted to disclose the "low company" she kept during drinking binges. She was later dismissed, supposedly for beating Byron when he was 11.

A few years later, while he was still a child, Lord Grey De Ruthyn (unrelated to May Gray), a suitor of his mother's, also made sexual advances on him. Byron's personality has been characterised as exceptionally proud and sensitive, especially with regard to his foot deformity. His extreme reaction to seeing his mother flirting outrageously with Lord Grey De Ruthyn after the incident suggests he did not tell her of Grey's conduct toward him; he simply refused to speak to him again and ignored his mother's commands to be reconciled. Leslie A. Marchand, one of Byron's biographers, theorises that Lord Grey De Ruthyn's advances prompted Byron's later sexual liaisons with young men at Harrow and Cambridge.

Scholars acknowledge a more or less important bisexual component in Byron's very complex sentimental and sexual life. Emily A. Bernhard Jackson asserts that "Byron's sexual orientation has long been a difficult, not to say contentious, topic, and anyone who seeks to discuss it must to some degree speculate since the evidence is nebulous, contradictory and scanty... it is not so simple to define Byron as homosexual or heterosexual: he seems rather to have been both, and either." Crompton states: "What was not understood in Byron's own century (except by a tiny circle of his associates) was that Byron was bisexual".

Another biographer, Fiona MacCarthy, has posited that Byron's true sexual yearnings were for adolescent males. It has been asserted that several letters to Byron from his friend Charles Skinner Matthews reveal that a key motive for Byron going on the Grand Tour was also the hope of homosexual experiences. While in Athens, Byron met 14-year-old Nicolo Giraud, who taught him Italian. Byron arranged to have Giraud enrolled in school at a monastery in Malta, and wrote him into his will, with a bequest of £7,000 (about £480,000 in 2025). That will, however, was later cancelled.

Byron wrote to Hobhouse from Athens, "I am tired of pl & opt Cs, the last thing I could be tired of." Opt Cs refers to a quote from Petronius' Satyricon, "coitum plenum et optabilem," "complete intercourse to one's heart's desire". Allegedly, Byron used this phrase as a code by which he communicated his homosexual Greek adventures to John Hobhouse in England: Emily A. Bernhard Jackson recalls that "Byron's early code for sex with a boy" was "Plen(um) and optabil(em) coit(um)". Bullough summarises:

Byron, was attached to Nicolo Giraud, a young French-Greek lad who had been a model for the painter Lusieri before Byron found him. Byron left him £7,000 in his will. When Byron returned to Italy, he became involved with a number of boys in Venice but eventually settled on Loukas Chalandritsanos, age 15, who was with him when he was killed [sic] (Crompton, 1985).

— Bullough (1990), p. 72

Loukas Chalandritsanos was Byron's Greek protégé whom he had rescued from Ithaca. During Byron's voyage from Zakynthos to Missolonghi, Byron took Loukas as his page, but was concerned that the boy might be captured by the Turks. He spoiled the teenaged Chalandritsanos outrageously, spending some £600 (about £60,000 in 2025) catering to his every whim over the course of 6 months. On his deathbed he gave Loukas a bag of Maria Theresa crowns and a £600 receipt for one of his loans to the Greeks, but the government was in no position to honour this, and Loukas died in poverty six months later. There has been speculation about whether the relationship between Byron and Loukas was homosexual, pointing to some of Byron's last poem verses as evidence for this claim.

=== Children ===
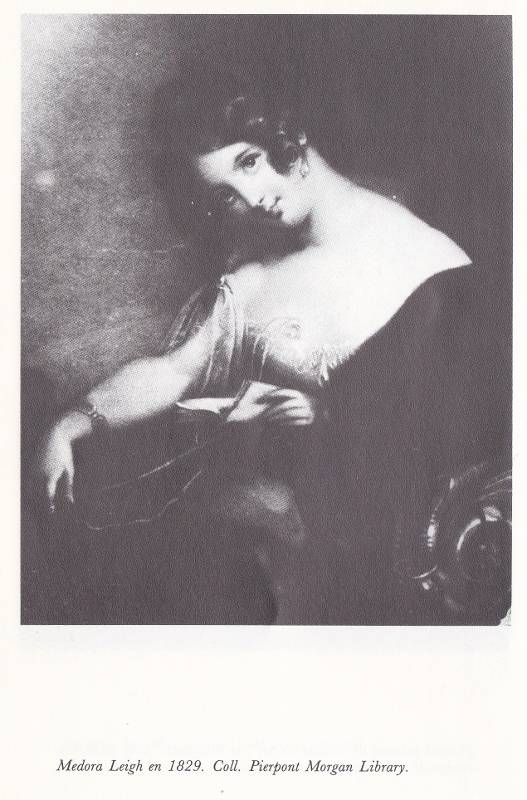
Elizabeth Medora Leigh (1814–1849)

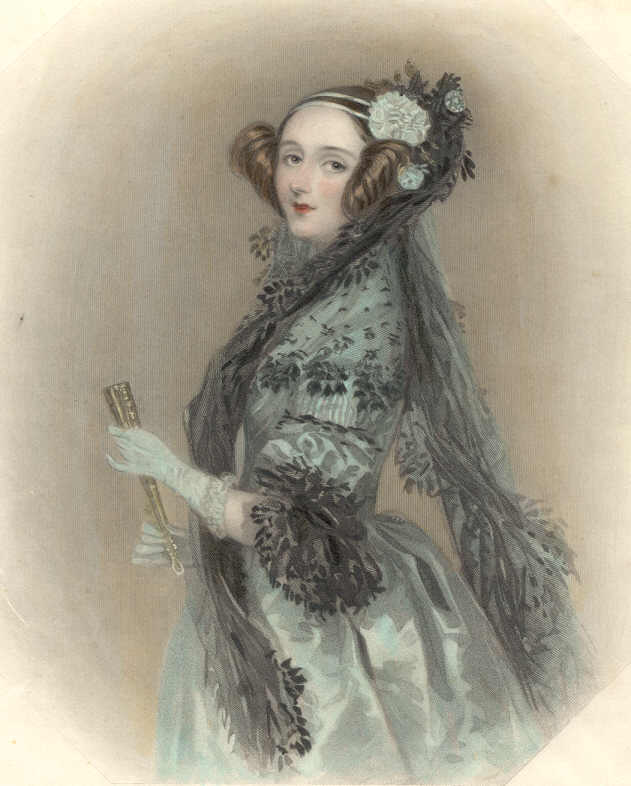
Ada, Countess of Lovelace
(1815–1852)

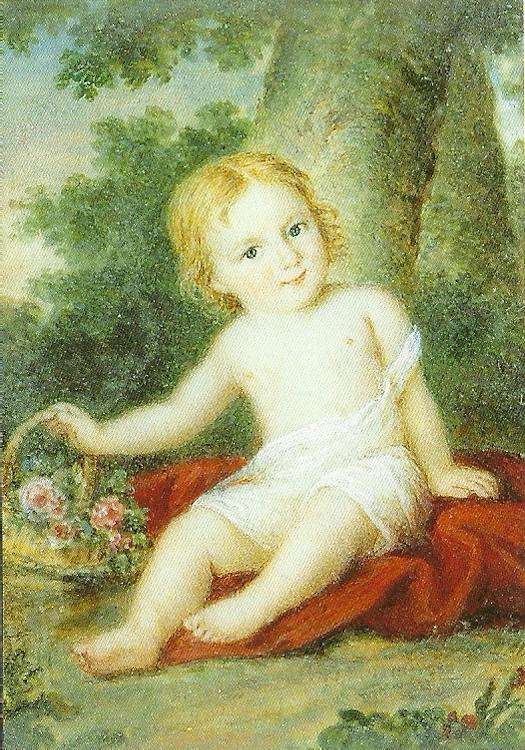
Clara Allegra Byron (1817–1822)

Byron wrote a letter to John Hanson from Newstead Abbey, dated 17 January 1809, that includes "You will discharge my Cook, & Laundry Maid, the other two I shall retain to take care of the house, more especially as the youngest is pregnant (I need not tell you by whom) and I cannot have the girl on the parish." His reference to "The youngest" is understood to have been to a maid, Lucy, and the parenthesised remark to indicate himself as siring a son born that year. In 2010 part of a baptismal record was uncovered which apparently said: "September 24 George illegitimate son of Lucy Monk, illegitimate son of Baron Byron, of Newstead, Nottingham, Newstead Abbey."

Augusta Leigh's child, Elizabeth Medora Leigh, born in 1814, was possibly fathered by Byron, who was Augusta's half-brother.

Byron had a child, The Hon. Augusta Ada Byron ("Ada", later Countess of Lovelace), in 1815, by his wife Annabella Byron, Lady Byron (née Anne Isabella Milbanke, or "Annabella"), later Lady Wentworth. Lovelace, notable in her own right, collaborated with Charles Babbage on the analytical engine, a predecessor to modern computers. She is recognised as one of the world's first computer programmers.

He also had an extramarital child in 1817, Clara Allegra Byron, with Claire Clairmont, stepsister of Mary Shelley and stepdaughter of William Godwin, writer of Political Justice and Caleb Williams. Allegra is not entitled to the style "The Hon." as is usually given to the daughter of barons, since she was born outside of his marriage. Born in Bath in 1817, Allegra lived with Byron for a few months in Venice; he refused to allow an Englishwoman caring for the girl to adopt her and objected to her being raised in the Shelleys' household.

He wished for her to be brought up Catholic and not marry an Englishman, and he made arrangements for her to inherit 5,000 lire upon marriage or when she reached the age of 21, provided she did not marry a native of Britain. However, the girl died aged five of a fever in Bagnacavallo, Italy, while Byron was in Pisa; he was deeply upset by the news. He had Allegra's body sent back to England to be buried at his old school, Harrow, because Protestants could not be buried in consecrated ground in Catholic countries. At one time he himself had wanted to be buried at Harrow. Byron was antagonistic towards Allegra's mother, Claire Clairmont, and prevented her from seeing the child.

During his time in Greece, Byron took interest in a Turkish Muslim nine-year-old girl called Hato or Hatagée whom he seriously considered adopting. Her mother was a wife of a local notable from Messolonghi, who, at the time, was a domestic servant to an Englishman named Dr. Millingen. The rest of the girl's family had either fled or perished after the Greek revolutionaries took over Messolonghi. Byron spent nearly £20 on elaborate dresses for Hato; he considered sending her to Teresa Guiccioli, or to his half-sister Augusta, or to his estranged wife as a playmate for his daughter Ada. Ultimately, Byron sent both Hato and her mother to Cephalonia to be cared for temporarily by his friend James Kennedy; soon after Byron's death they were reunited with their surviving family.

In 1995, Christina Hardyment of The Daily Telegraph discovered a hitherto unknown connection to Byron through the poet Michael C. Burgess. Hardyment interviewed Burgess and his father, Geoffrey, after reading Byron and his children by Susan Normington. The book linked Hannah Burgess, Geoffrey's great-great grandmother, to Byron through her father William Marshall. Normington's research says Byron had "fathered at least four bastards" and that Marshall is one of Byron's alleged children.

=== Scotland ===
Although neglected by traditional history, Byron held deep ties to Scotland. His maternal family originated in Aberdeenshire and Byron studied at the Aberdeen Grammar School from 1794 to 1798. In terms of his national identity, he once described himself in a tongue-in-cheek manner as "half a Scot by birth, and bred/A whole one" and reportedly spoke with a faint Scottish accent throughout his life. Byron was described as a Scotsman by several of his contemporaries, including Lamb and Gordon, the latter of whom referred to him as a "Highlander".

The historian Murray Pittock argues Byron's links to Scotland were demonstrated "in his campaign for the liberation of Greece, where a disproportionate number of his closest friends and associates had strong Scottish connections, particularly with regard to north-eastern Scotland, which through his Gordon links remained central to the Byronic network throughout his life". However, Byron often expressed anti-Scottish sentiments in his writings and conversations with friends. Moore wrote in 1840 about Byron's views on Scotland:

Cordial, however, and deep as were the impressions he retained of Scotland, he would sometimes in this, as in all his other amiable feelings, endeavour perversely to belie his on better nature; and when under the excitement of anger or ridicule persuade not only others, but even himself, that the whole current of feelings ran directly otherwise. The abuse which in his anger against the ER he overwhelmed every thing Scotch is an instance of his temporary triumph of wilfulness; and at any time, the least association of ridicule with the country or its inhabitants was sufficient, for the moment, to put all his sentiment to flight. A friend of his once described to me the half-playful rage into which she saw him thrown one day, by a heedless girl, who remarked that she thought he had a little of the Scotch accent. "Good God, I hope not!" he exclaimed, "I'm sure I haven't. I would rather the whole damned country was sunk into the sea - I the Scotch accent!"

Byron's English Bards and Scotch Reviewers, in which he denounced the Scottish literary establishment, and the Curse of Minerva have both been interpreted as "savagely repudiating all his claims of connection to Scotland". In the Curse of Minerva, Byron wrote:

Daughter of Jove! in Britain’s injured name, A true-born Briton may the deed disclaim.

Frown not on England; England owns him not: Athena, no! thy plunderer was a Scot.
Ask’st thou the difference? From fair Phyle’s towers. Survey Bœotia; – Caledonia’s ours.
And well I know within that bastard land, Hath Wisdom’s goddess never held command;
A barren soil, where Nature’s germs, confined; To stern sterility, can stint the mind;

Whose thistle well betrays the niggard earth; Emblem of all to whom the Land gives birth.

=== Sea and swimming ===
Byron enjoyed adventure, especially relating to the sea.

The first recorded notable example of open-water swimming took place on 3 May 1810 when Byron swam from Europe to Asia across the Dardanelles. This is often seen as the birth of the sport and pastime, and to commemorate it, the event is recreated every year as an open water swimming event.

Whilst sailing from Genoa to Cephalonia in 1823, every day at noon, Byron and Trelawny, in calm weather, jumped overboard for a swim without fear of sharks, which were not unknown in those waters. Once, according to Trelawny, they let the geese and ducks loose and followed them and the dogs into the water, each with an arm in the ship Captain's new scarlet waistcoat, to the annoyance of the Captain and the amusement of the crew.

=== Fondness for animals ===
Byron had a great love of animals, most notably for a Newfoundland dog named Boatswain. When the animal contracted rabies, Byron nursed him, albeit unsuccessfully, despite the risk of becoming bitten and infected.

Although deeply in debt at the time, Byron commissioned an impressive marble funerary monument for Boatswain at Newstead Abbey, larger than his own, and the only building work that he ever carried out on his estate. In his 1811 will, Byron requested that he be buried with him. The 26‐line poem "Epitaph to a Dog" has become one of his best-known works. But a draft of an 1830 letter by Hobhouse shows him to be the author; Byron decided to use Hobhouse's lengthy epitaph instead of his own, which read: "To mark a friend's remains these stones arise/I never knew but one – and here he lies."

In a letter sent to Thomas Moore, Byron described following a diet "inspired by Pythagoras", who was a famous vegetarian.

Byron also kept a tame bear while he was a student at Trinity out of resentment for rules forbidding pet dogs like his beloved Boatswain. There being no mention of bears in their statutes, the college authorities had no legal basis for complaining; Byron even suggested that he would apply for a college fellowship for the bear.

During his lifetime, in addition to numerous cats, dogs, and horses, Byron kept a fox, monkeys, an eagle, a crow, a falcon, peacocks, guinea hens, an Egyptian crane, a badger, geese, a heron, and a goat. Except for the horses, they all resided indoors at his homes in England, Switzerland, Italy, and Greece. Percy Shelley, visiting Byron in Italy in 1821, described his menagerie:

"Lord B's establishment consists, besides servants, of ten horses, eight enormous dogs, three monkeys, five cats, an eagle, a crow, and a falcon; and all these, except the horses, walk about the house, which every now and then resounds with their unarbitrated quarrels, as if they were the masters of it… P.S. I find that my enumeration of the animals in this Circean Palace was defective…I have just met on the grand staircase five peacocks, two guinea hens, and an Egyptian crane.

— Diary of Percy Shelley

=== Vaccine scepticism ===
Byron included an endorsement of vaccine hesitancy in his 1809 poem English Bards and Scotch Reviewers, he writes:

Thus saith the Preacher: "Nought beneath the sun / Is new," yet still from change to change we run. / What varied wonders tempt us as they pass! / The Cow-pox, Tractors, Galvanism, and Gas, / In turns appear, to make the vulgar stare, / Till the swoln bubble bursts—and all is air!

— Lord Byron, English Bards and Scotch Reviewers

Byron refers to 'cow-pox', a reference to Edward Jenner's smallpox vaccine. He compares these vaccines with tractors (a fraudulent medical device), and galvanism, which was understood at the time to reference the reanimation of deceased convicts using electricity. "Gas" was likely a reference to nitrous oxide, a substance recently discovered by Humphry Davy to treat respiratory ailments. The deliberate choice to frame vaccines as similar to well-known controversial medical treatments shows Byron's tendency toward vaccine hesitancy in his writings.

However, it appears he held different views in private, as he had his protege Robert Rushton inoculated for smallpox.

== Health and appearance ==
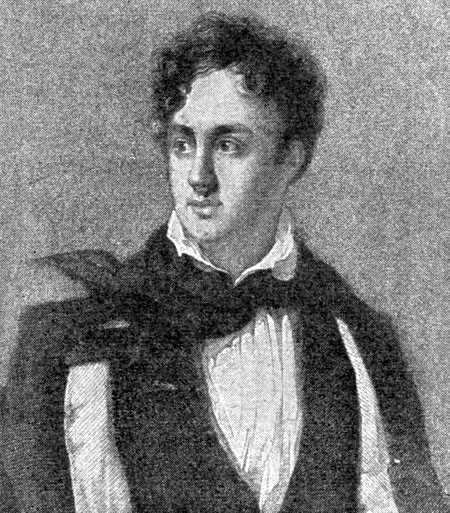
Byron (drawn in 1830)

=== Character and psyche ===
I am such a strange mélange of good and evil that it would be difficult to describe me.

As a boy, Byron's character is described as a "mixture of affectionate sweetness and playfulness, by which it was impossible not to be attached", although he also exhibited "silent rages, moody sullenness and revenge" with a precocious bent for attachment and obsession.

=== Deformed foot ===
From birth, Byron had a deformity of his right foot. Although it has generally been referred to as a "club foot", some modern medical authors maintain that it was a consequence of infantile paralysis (poliomyelitis), and others that it was a dysplasia, a failure of the bones to form properly. Whatever the cause, he was affected by a limp that caused him lifelong psychological and physical misery, aggravated by painful and pointless "medical treatment" in his childhood and the nagging suspicion that with proper care it might have been cured.

He was extremely self-conscious about this from a young age, nicknaming himself le diable boîteux, French for "the limping devil", after the nickname given to Asmodeus by Alain-René Lesage in his 1707 novel of the same name. Although he often wore specially-made shoes in an attempt to hide the deformed foot, he refused to wear any type of brace that might improve the limp.

The Scottish novelist John Galt felt his oversensitivity to the "innocent fault in his foot was unmanly and excessive" because the limp was "not greatly conspicuous". He first met Byron on a voyage to Sardinia and did not realise he had any deficiency for several days, and still could not tell at first whether the lameness was a temporary injury or not. At the time Galt met him he was an adult and had worked to develop "a mode of walking across a room by which it was scarcely at all perceptible". The motion of the ship at sea may also have helped to create a favourable first impression and hide any deficiencies in his gait, but Galt's biography is also described as being "rather well-meant than well-written", so Galt may be guilty of minimising a defect that was actually still noticeable.

=== Physical appearance and diet ===
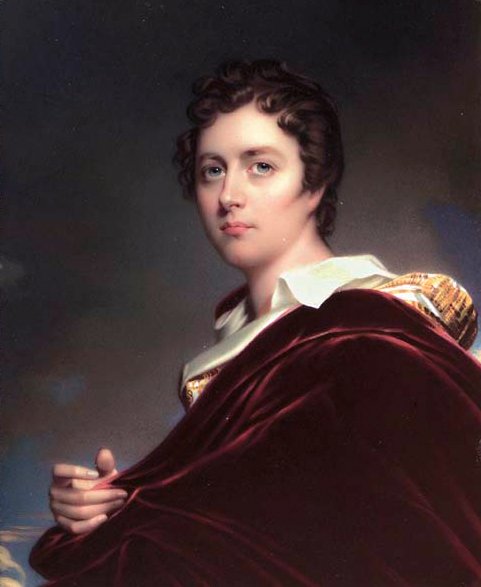
Lord Byron by Henry Pierce Bone

Byron's adult height was 5 feet 9 inches (1.75 m), his weight fluctuating between 9.5 stone (133 lb; 60 kg) and 14 stone (200 lb; 89 kg). He was renowned for his personal beauty, which he enhanced by wearing curl-papers in his hair at night. He was athletic, being a competent boxer, horse-rider and an excellent swimmer. He attended pugilistic tuition at the Bond Street rooms of the former prizefighting champion 'Gentleman' John Jackson, whom Byron called 'the Emperor of Pugilism', and recorded these sparring sessions in his letters and journals.

Byron and other writers, such as his friend Hobhouse, described his eating habits in detail. At the time he entered Cambridge, he went on a strict diet to control his weight. He also exercised a great deal, and at that time wore a great many clothes to cause himself to perspire. For most of his life, he was a vegetarian and often lived for days on dry biscuits and white wine. Occasionally, he would eat large helpings of meat and desserts, after which he would purge himself. Although he is described by Galt and others as having a predilection for "violent" exercise, Hobhouse suggests that the pain in his deformed foot made physical activity difficult and that his weight problem was the result.

Trelawny, who observed Byron's eating habits, noted that he lived on a diet of biscuits and soda water for days at a time and then would eat a "horrid mess of cold potatoes, rice, fish, or greens, deluged in vinegar, and gobble it up like a famished dog".

== Political career ==
Byron first took his seat in the House of Lords on 13 March 1809 but left London on 11 June 1809 for the Continent. Byron's association with the Holland House Whigs provided him with a discourse of liberty rooted in the Glorious Revolution of 1688. A strong advocate of social reform, he received particular praise as one of the few Parliamentary defenders of the Luddites: specifically, he was against a death penalty for Luddite "frame breakers" in Nottinghamshire, who destroyed textile machines that were putting them out of work.

His first speech before the Lords, on 27 February 1812, was loaded with sarcastic references to the "benefits" of automation, which he saw as producing inferior material as well as putting people out of work, and concluded the proposed law was only missing two things to be effective: "Twelve Butchers for a Jury and a Jeffries for a Judge!". Byron's speech was officially recorded and printed in Hansard. He said later that he "spoke very violent sentences with a sort of modest impudence" and thought he came across as "a bit theatrical". The full text of the speech, which Byron had previously written out, was presented in manuscript form to Dallas, who quotes it in his work.

Two months later, in conjunction with the other Whigs, Byron made another impassioned speech before the House of Lords in support of Catholic emancipation. Byron expressed opposition to the established religion because it was unfair to people of other faiths.

These experiences inspired Byron to write political poems such as Song for the Luddites (1816) and The Landlords' Interest, Canto XIV of The Age of Bronze. Examples of poems in which he attacked his political opponents include Wellington: The Best of the Cut-Throats (1819) and The Intellectual Eunuch Castlereagh (1818).

== Poetic works ==
Byron wrote prolifically. In 1832 his regular publisher, John Murray, released the complete works in 14 duodecimo volumes, including a life by Thomas Moore. Subsequent editions were released in 17 volumes, first published in 1833. An extensive collection of his works, including early editions and annotated manuscripts, is held within the John Murray Archive at the National Library of Scotland in Edinburgh.

=== Don Juan ===
Byron's magnum opus, Don Juan, a poem spanning 17 cantos, ranks as one of the most important long poems published in England since John Milton's Paradise Lost. Byron published the first two cantos anonymously in 1819 after disputes with his regular publisher over the shocking nature of the poetry. By this time, he had been a famous poet for seven years, and when he self-published the beginning cantos, they were well received in some quarters. The poem was then released volume by volume through his regular publishing house. By 1822, cautious acceptance by the public had turned to outrage, and Byron's publisher refused to continue to publish the work. In Canto III of Don Juan, Byron expresses his detestation for poets such as William Wordsworth and Samuel Taylor Coleridge. In letters to Francis Hodgson, Byron referred to Wordsworth as "Turdsworth".

=== Irish Avatar ===
Byron wrote the satirical pamphlet Irish Avatar after the royal visit by King George IV to Ireland. Byron criticised the attitudes displayed by the Irish people towards the Crown, an institution he perceived as oppressing them, and was dismayed by the positive reception George IV received during his visit. In the pamphlet, Byron lambasted Irish unionists and voiced muted support towards nationalistic sentiments in Ireland.

== Parthenon marbles ==
Byron was a bitter opponent of Lord Elgin's removal of the Parthenon marbles from Athens and "reacted with fury" when Elgin's agent gave him a tour of the Parthenon, during which he saw the spaces left by the missing part of the frieze and metopes. He denounced Elgin's actions in his poem The Curse of Minerva and in Canto II (stanzas XI–XV) of Childe Harold's Pilgrimage.

== Legacy and influence ==
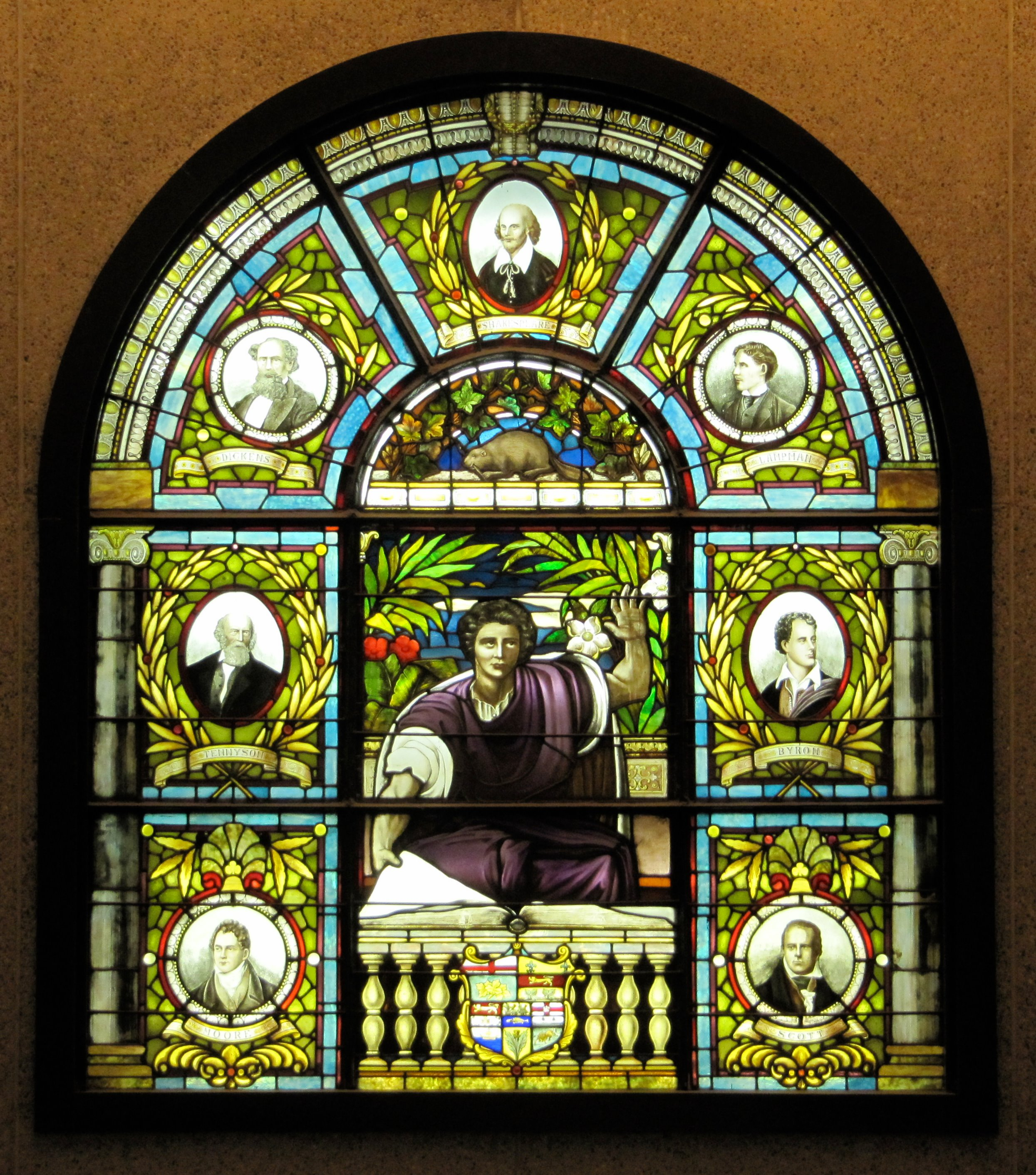
Stained glass at Ottawa Public Library featuring Charles Dickens, Archibald Lampman, Sir Walter Scott, Byron, Alfred, Lord Tennyson, William Shakespeare, and Thomas Moore

Byron's image fascinated the public, and his wife Annabella coined the term "Byromania" to refer to the commotion surrounding him. His self-awareness and personal promotion are seen as a beginning of what would become the modern rock star; he would instruct artists painting portraits of him not to paint him with pen or book in hand, but as a "man of action". While Byron first welcomed fame, he later turned from it by going into voluntary exile from Britain.

Biographies were distorted by the burning, a month after his death, of Byron's Memoirs in the offices of John Murray, the firm that had published his work; and by the suppression of details of Byron's bisexuality by subsequent heads of the firm, which held the richest Byron archive. As late as the 1950s, the scholar Leslie A. Marchand was expressly forbidden by the Murray company to reveal details of Byron's same-sex passions.

The re-founding of the Byron Society in 1971 reflected the fascination that many people had with Byron and his work. This society became very active, publishing an annual journal. Thirty-six Byron Societies function throughout the world, and an International Conference takes place annually.

Byron influenced Continental literature and art, and his reputation as a poet is higher in many European countries than in Britain, or America, although not as high as in his time, when he was widely thought to be the greatest poet in the world. Byron's writings also inspired many composers. Over forty operas have been based on his works, in addition to three operas about Byron himself, including Virgil Thomson's Lord Byron. His poetry was set to music by many Romantic composers, including Ludwig van Beethoven, Franz Schubert, Felix Mendelssohn, Robert Schumann and Carl Loewe. Among his greatest admirers was Hector Berlioz, whose operas, Harold in Italy and Mémoires reveal Byron's influence. Franz Liszt was also deeply influenced by Byron, drawing inspiration from Childe Harold's Pilgrimage for his Années de pèlerinage and describing his own artistic persona as imbued with “mon byronisme”, embracing the Byronic hero ideal. In the twentieth century, Arnold Schoenberg set Byron's "Ode to Napoleon" to music.

In April 2020 Byron was featured in a series of British postage stamps issued by the Royal Mail to commemorate the Romantic poets on the 250th anniversary of the birth of William Wordsworth. Ten 1st class stamps were issued of all the major British romantic poets, and each stamp included an extract from one of their most popular and enduring works, with Byron's "She Walks in Beauty" selected for the poet.

=== Byronic hero ===
The literary heroic figure of the "Byronic hero" has come to epitomize many of Byron's characteristics, and indeed this type of character pervades his own work. The use of a Byronic hero by many authors and artists of the Romantic movement shows Byron's influence during the 19th century and beyond, including the Brontë sisters. His philosophy was more durably influential in continental Europe than in England; Friedrich Nietzsche admired him, and the Byronic hero was echoed in Nietzsche's Übermensch, or superman.

The Byronic hero presents an idealised, but flawed character whose attributes include: great talent; great passion; a distaste for society and social institutions; a lack of respect for rank and privilege (although possessing both); being thwarted in love by social constraint or death; rebellion; exile; an unsavoury secret past; arrogance; overconfidence or lack of foresight; and, ultimately, a self-destructive manner. These types of characters have since become ubiquitous in literature and politics.

== Works ==
The Bride of Abydos or Selim and Zuleika, an 1857 painting by Eugène Delacroix depicting Byron's work

- Index of Titles
- Index of First Lines

=== Major works ===
- Hours of Idleness (1807)
- Lachin y Gair (1807)
- English Bards and Scotch Reviewers (1809)
- The Curse of Minerva (1812)
- Childe Harold's Pilgrimage, Cantos I & II (1812)
- The Giaour (1813) (text on Wikisource)
- The Bride of Abydos (1813)
- The Corsair (1814) (text on Wikisource)
- Lara, A Tale (1814) (text on Wikisource)
- Hebrew Melodies (1815)
- The Siege of Corinth (1816) (text on Wikisource)
- Parisina (1816) (text on Wikisource)
- The Prisoner of Chillon (1816) (text on Wikisource)
- The Dream (1816) (text on Wikisource)
- Prometheus (1816) (text on Wikisource)
- Darkness (1816) (text on Wikisource)
- Manfred (1817) (text on Wikisource)
- The Lament of Tasso (1817)
- Beppo (1818) (text on Wikisource)
- Childe Harold's Pilgrimage (1818) (text on Wikisource)
- Don Juan (1819–1824; incomplete on Byron's death in 1824) (text on Wikisource)
- Mazeppa (1819)
- The Prophecy of Dante (1819)
- Marino Faliero (1820)
- Sardanapalus (1821)
- The Two Foscari (1821)
- Cain (1821)
- The Vision of Judgment (1821)
- Heaven and Earth (1821)
- Werner (1822)
- The Age of Bronze (1823)
- The Island (1823) (text on Wikisource)
- The Deformed Transformed (1824)

=== Selected shorter lyric poems ===
- Maid of Athens, ere we part (1810) (text on Wikisource)
- And thou art dead (1812) (text on Wikisource)
- She Walks in Beauty (1814) (text on Wikisource)
- My Soul is Dark (1815) (text on Wikisource)
- The Destruction of Sennacherib (1815) (text on Wikisource)
- Monody on the Death of the Right Hon. R. B. Sheridan (1816) (text on Wikisource)
- Fare Thee Well (1816) (text on Wikisource)
- So, we'll go no more a roving (1817) (text on Wikisource)
- When We Two Parted (1817) (text on Wikisource)
- Ode on Venice (1819) (text on Wikisource)
- Stanzas (1819)
- Don Leon (not by Lord Byron, but attributed to him; 1830s)

== See also ==
- Early life of Lord Byron
- Timeline of Lord Byron
- 19th century in poetry
- Bridge of Sighs, a Venice landmark Byron denominated
- Asteroid 3306 Byron

Peerage of England
Preceded by William Byron	Baron Byron; 1798–1824	Succeeded by George Byron
