= 1816 in literature =

This article contains information about the literary events and publications of 1816.

== Events ==
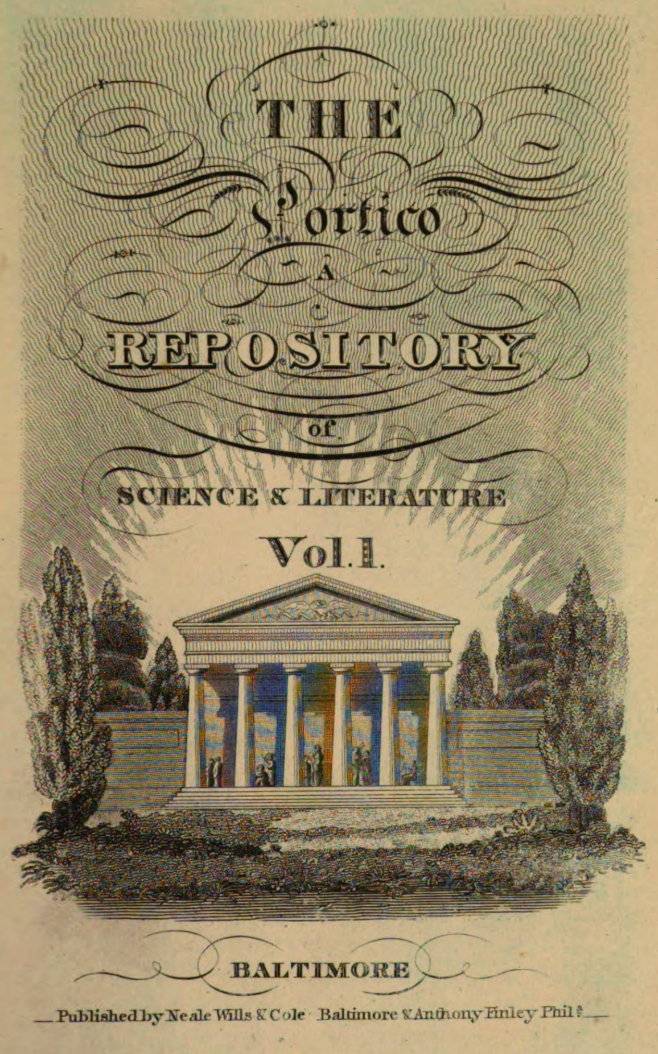
Volume 1 of The Portico: A Repository of Science & Literature

- January – The Portico: A Repository of Science & Literature is launched in Baltimore with poetry, literary criticism and essays by John Neal and others.
- April – Lord Byron leaves England for good to tour continental Europe. Byron's wife Annabella Milbanke had left him in January 1816, taking their months-old daughter Ada with her. Their separation was made legal in a private settlement in March 1816. The scandal of the separation, the rumours about Byron's affair with his paternal half-sister Augusta Leigh, and his ever-increasing debts forced Byron to leave England in April 1816, never to return.
- April 14 – Lord Byron's poems "A Sketch from Private Life" and "Fare Thee Well", about his separation from his wife Annabella Milbanke, are published without authority in The Champion. "Fare Thee Well"was also printed in Leigh Hunt's Examiner, on April 21, 1816, at the end of an article by L. H. entitled "Distressing Circumstances in High Life."
- May 5 – The first published poem by 20-year-old trainee surgeon John Keats, the sonnet "To Solitude", appears in The Examiner.
- May 9 – Lady Caroline Lamb's anonymous novel Glenarvon is the first book published independently by Henry Colburn in London. A roman à clef, it contains an unflattering portrait of her ex-lover Lord Byron in the rakish title character of Lord Glenarvon and provokes Purity of Heart; Or, The Ancient Costume: A Tale, in One Volume, Addressed to the Author of Glenarvon, "a virulent, polemical novel" by "An old wife of twenty years", actually clergyman's spouse Elizabeth Thomas.
- July – Lord Byron, Mary Wollstonecraft Godwin, Percy Bysshe Shelley and John Polidori, who have gathered at the Villa Diodati by Lake Geneva in a rainy Switzerland in this 'Year Without a Summer', tell each other tales. This spawns two classic Gothic narratives, Mary Shelley's Frankenstein and Polidori's The Vampyre (based on Byron's "Fragment of a Novel"). Byron also writes the poem Darkness. In late August Shelley and Godwin return to England, taking with them some of Byron's manuscripts for his publisher.
- September 16
  - Lord Byron's Monody on the Death of the Right Honourable R. B. Sheridan, written at the request of Douglas Kinnaird, is spoken at the Theatre Royal, Drury Lane, London by Mrs. Maria Davison.
  - Actor William Macready makes his London debut at Covent Garden, as Orestes in The Distressed Mother, a translation of Racine's Andromaque made by Ambrose Philips.
- October
  - Charles Wentworth Dilke and his friend Charles Armitage Brown take up residence at Wentworth Place in Hampstead, then on the northern edge of London.
  - John Keats writes his sonnet "On First Looking into Chapman's Homer".
- November 25 – The Chestnut Street Theatre in Philadelphia (United States) becomes the world's first to be lit by gas.
- December – John Keats composes the poem "Sleep and Poetry" while staying at the Hampstead house of his friend Leigh Hunt, who introduces him to Shelley.
- December 5 – Lord Byron's The Prisoner of Chillon, and Other Poems is published in London. John Murray, his publisher, is able to sell 7,000 copies of this and of Childe Harold's Pilgrimage, Canto III (published November 18) to booksellers at a dinner this month.
- December 30 – Percy Bysshe Shelley marries his mistress Mary Wollstonecraft Godwin in London, after the suicides on October 9 of her half-sister, Fanny Imlay (by laudanum in Swansea), and on December 10 of his pregnant estranged first wife, Harriet (by drowning in The Serpentine).
- unknown dates
  - Publication in Mexico of José Joaquín Fernández de Lizardi's comic picaresque novel The Mangy Parrot: The Life and Times of Periquillo Sarniento written by himself for his children (El Periquillo Sarniento) in installments, generally seen as the first novel written and published in Latin America, although government censorship prevents the final chapters from being published until the 1830s.
  - Shakespeare's Hamlet is for the first time performed at the castle of Kronborg in Helsingør (Elsinore, Denmark), where it is set.
  - Therese Huber begins to edit Morgenblatt für gebildete Stände in Tübingen.

== New books ==
=== Fiction ===
- Thomas Ashe – The Soldier of Fortune
- Sarah Burney – Tales of Fancy: The Shipwreck
- Benjamin Constant – Adolphe
- Selina Davenport – The Original of the Miniature
- Stéphanie Félicité, Comtesse de Genlis – Jane of France
- Jane Harvey – Brougham Castle
- Ann Hatton – Chronicles of an Illustrious House
- Barbara Hofland – The Maid of Moscow
- Leigh Hunt – The Story of Rimini
- Frances Margaretta Jacson (wrongly ascribed to Mary Brunton) – Rhoda
- Henry Gally Knight – Ilderim, a Syrian Tale
- Lady Caroline Lamb – Glenarvon
- Alicia Le Fanu – Strathallan
- José Joaquín Fernández de Lizardi – The Mangy Parrot
- Emma Parker – Self-deception
- David William Paynter – Godfrey Ranger
- Walter Scott
  - The Antiquary
  - The Black Dwarf
  - Old Mortality

=== Children ===
- François Guillaume Ducray-Duminil – Jean et Jeannette, ou les Petits aventuriers parisiens (Jean and Jeanette, or Two Little Adventurers in Paris)
- E. T. A. Hoffmann – Nussknacker und Mausekönig (The Nutcracker and the Mouse King, basis of ballet The Nutcracker)

=== Drama ===
- Samuel Taylor Coleridge – Zapolya
- Bernhard Severin Ingemann – Reinald Underbarnet (The Miraculous Child Reinald)
- Charles Maturin – Bertram; or The Castle of St. Aldobrand
- John Tobin – The Faro Table

=== Poetry ===
- Lord Byron
  - Childe Harold's Pilgrimage, Canto III
  - Prometheus
  - The Siege of Corinth
- Samuel Taylor Coleridge – "Christabel"; "Kubla Khan: A Vision" [written 1797]; "The Pains of Sleep"
- John Keats – "On First Looking into Chapman's Homer"
- Percy Bysshe Shelley
  - Alastor, or The Spirit of Solitude
  - Mont Blanc

=== Non-fiction ===
- Franz Bopp – Über das Conjugationssystem der Sanskritsprache in Vergleichung mit jenem der griechischen, lateinischen, persischen und germanischen Sprache (On the Conjugation System of Sanskrit in comparison with that of Greek, Latin, Persian and Germanic)
- Samuel Taylor Coleridge – The Statesman's Manual; or, The Bible the best guide to political skill and foresight: a lay sermon
- John Hoyland – A Historical Survey of the Customs, Habits, and Present State of the Gypsies
- Nikolay Karamzin – History of the Russian State (История государства Российского, Istoriya gosudarstva Rossiyskogo; publication begins)
- George Sinclair – Hortus gramineus Woburnensis
- John Whittaker (printer) – Whittaker Magna Carta

== Births ==
- January 16 - Frances Browne, Irish poet and novelist (died 1879)
- January 25 – Anna Gardner, American abolitionist, teacher, reformer, author (died 1901)
- February 18 – Ferdinand Dugué, French poet and playwright (died 1913)
- March 1 – Kawatake Mokuami (河竹黙阿弥), Japanese kabuki dramatist (died 1893)
- April 1 – Peter Cunningham, British literary scholar and antiquarian (died 1869)
- April 21 – Charlotte Brontë, English novelist and poet (died 1855)
- June 2 – Grace Aguilar, English novelist (died 1847)
- September 16
  - Mary Hall Adams, American book editor and letter writer (died 1860)
  - Theodore Martin, Scottish poet, biographer and translator (died 1909)
- September 20 – Fredrik August Dahlgren, Swedish dramatist and songwriter (died 1895)
- November 1 – Friedrich Wilhelm Hackländer, German novelist, dramatist and travel writer (died 1877)
- November 28 – Theodosia Trollope (Theodosia Garrow), English poet and translator (died 1865)
- possible year, unknown date – Dimitrie Ralet, Moldavian essayist, dramatist, poet and propagandist (died 1858)

== Deaths ==
- February 22 – Adam Ferguson, Scottish philosopher (born 1723)
- March 3 – Johann August von Starck, German writer and theologian (born 1741
- April 28 – Johann Heinrich Abicht, German philosopher (born 1762)
- July 7 – Richard Brinsley Sheridan, Irish playwright and politician (born 1751)
- July 23 – Elizabeth Hamilton, Irish-born Scottish essayist, poet and novelist (born c. 1756)
- August 9 – Johann August Apel, German writer, jurist and musicologist (born 1771)
- September 9 – Eliza Fay, English letter-writer and traveller (born 1755 or 1756)
- October 27 – Santō Kyōden (real name Iwase Samuru), Japanese fiction writer, poet and artist (born 1761)
- November 16 – Pierre-Louis Ginguené, French author (born 1748)

== Sources ==
- McGann, Jerome (2013) [2004]. "Byron, George Gordon Noel (1788–1824)". Oxford Dictionary of National Biography (online ed.). Oxford University Press. doi:10.1093/ref:odnb/4279. (Subscription, Wikipedia Library access or UK public library membership required.)
