= The Giaour =

Poem by Lord Byron

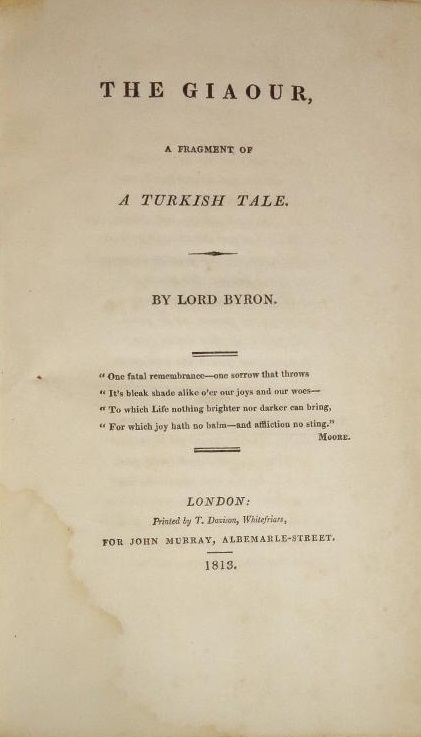
- 1813 title page, first edition, second issue. London, John Murray.
- Author: Lord Byron
- Language: English
- Genre: Romance/Epic poetry
- Published: 1813, John Murray. Printer: T. Davison.
- Publication place: United Kingdom
- Media type: Print
- Pages: 41
- Length: 458 lines

The Giaour, A Fragment of a Turkish Tale is a poem by Lord Byron first published in 1813 by John Murray and printed by Thomas Davison. It was the first in the series of Byron's Oriental romances. The Giaour proved to be a great success when published, consolidating Byron's reputation critically and commercially. There were twelve editions by 1814. A thirteenth edition was published in 1815.

== Background ==
Byron was inspired to write the poem during 1810 and 1811 in the course of his 1809–1811 Grand Tour, which he undertook with his friend John Cam Hobhouse. While in Athens, he became aware of the Turkish custom of throwing a woman found guilty of adultery into the sea wrapped in a sack.

"Giaour" (Turkish: Gâvur) is an offensive Turkish word for infidel or non-believer, and is similar but unrelated to the Arabic word "kafir". The story, subtitled "A Fragment of a Turkish Tale", is Byron's only fragmentary narrative poem. Byron designed the story with three narrators giving their individual points of view about the series of events. The main story tells of a member of Hassan's harem, Leila, who loves the giaour and is killed by being drowned in the sea by Hassan. In revenge, the giaour kills Hassan and then enters a monastery due to his remorse.

The design of the story allows for contrast between Christian and Muslim perceptions of love, death, and the afterlife.

Byron wrote the poem after he had become famous overnight following the 1812 publication of the first two cantos of Childe Harold's Pilgrimage; it reflects his disenchantment with fame. It also reflects the gloom, remorse, and lust of two illicit love affairs, one with his half-sister Augusta Leigh and the other with Lady Frances Webster.

The earliest version of the poem was written between September 1812 and March 1813, and a version of 700 lines was published in June 1813. Several more editions appeared before the end of 1813, each longer than the last. The last edition contains 1,300 lines, almost twice as many as the version first published.

== Romantic Orientalism ==
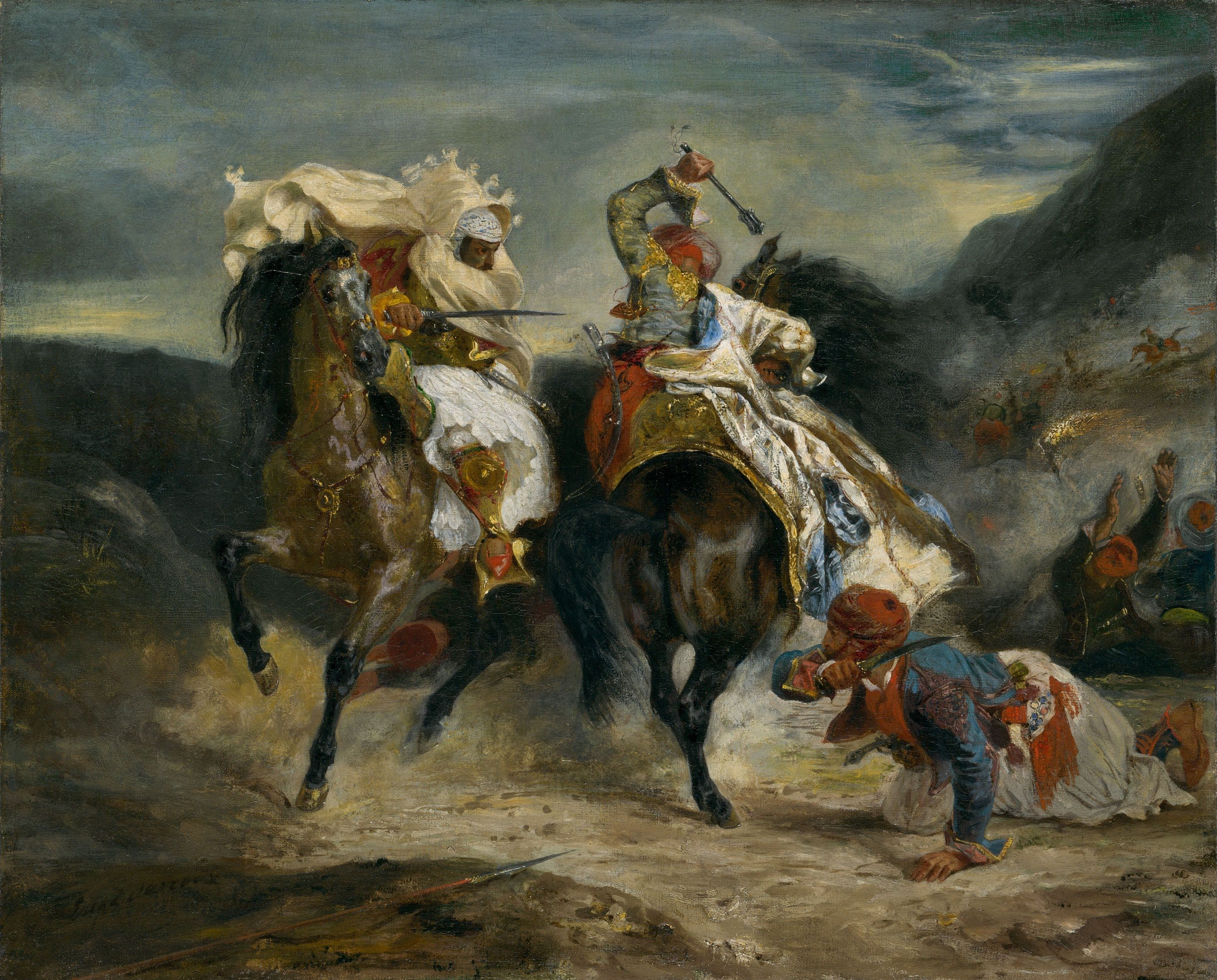
The Combat of the Giaour and Hassan, Eugène Delacroix (1826)

The Giaour proved to be very popular with twelve editions published in the first year. By 1815, 14 editions had been published when it was included in his first collected edition. Its runaway success led Byron to publish three more "Turkish tales" in the next couple of years: The Bride of Abydos in 1813, The Corsair in 1814, and Lara. Each of these poems proved to be very popular, with "The Corsair" selling 10,000 copies in its first day of publication. These tales led to the public perception of the Byronic hero.

Byron commented ironically on the success of these works in his 1818 poem Beppo:

Oh that I had the art of easy writing
What should be easy reading! could I scale
Parnassus, where the Muses sit inditing
Those pretty poems never known to fail,
How quickly would I print (the world delighting)
A Grecian, Syrian, or Assyrian tale;
And sell you, mix'd with western sentimentalism,
Some samples of the finest Orientalism.

— Stanza LI

French painter Eugène Delacroix used the story as the inspiration for three paintings, all titled The Combat of the Giaour and Hassan. So did Ary Scheffer, who painted Giaour, today housed at the Musée de la Vie romantique, Paris.

== Influence ==
The poem was an influence on the early work of Edgar Allan Poe. His first major poem, "Tamerlane", published in 1827, particularly emulates both the manner and style of The Giaour.

Polish poet Adam Mickiewicz translated the work into Polish in 1833. Mickiewicz wrote in November 1822: "I think I shall translate The Giaour."

=== Vampirism theme ===
The Giaour is also notable for its inclusion of the theme of vampires and vampirism, it being one of the first written mentions of such topics (preceded by John Stagg's The Vampyre in 1810). After telling how the giaour killed Hassan, the Ottoman narrator predicts that in punishment for his crime, the giaour will be condemned to become a vampire after his death and kill his own family by sucking their blood, to his own frightful torment as well as theirs. Byron became acquainted with the concept of vampires while on his Grand Tour.

The description of the vampire, lines 757–768:

But first, on earth as vampire sent,
Thy corse shall from its tomb be rent:
Then ghastly haunt thy native place,
And suck the blood of all thy race;
There from thy daughter, sister, wife,
At midnight drain the stream of life;
Yet loathe the banquet which perforce
Must feed thy livid living corse:
Thy victims ere they yet expire
Shall know the demon for their sire,
As cursing thee, thou cursing them,
Thy flowers are withered on the stem.

The association of Byron with vampires continued in 1819 with the publication of The Vampyre by John William Polidori, which was inspired by and based on an unfinished story by Byron, "A Fragment", also known as "Fragment of a Novel" and "The Burial: A Fragment", first published in Mazeppa in 1819. The lead character, Lord Ruthven, was based on Byron. Polidori had previously worked as Byron's doctor and the two parted on bad terms. Much to Byron's annoyance, The Vampyre was widely attributed to him and even included in the third volume of Byron's works by popular demand. Polidori's tale was published by Henry Colburn on 1 April 1819, without Polidori's knowledge or permission. Polidori immediately wrote to Colburn stating that 'the tale of the Vampyre – which is not Lord Byron's but was written entirely by me at the request of a lady [...] saying that she thought it impossible to work up such materials, desired I would write it for her, which I did in two idle mornings by her side.' The revelation caused a great scandal, and Polidori benefitted very little from it, either financially or personally. Lord Ruthven was the first portrayal of the vampire as a debauched aristocrat.

== Adaptations ==
=== Film ===
The Giaour, with screenplay by and to be directed by Rika Ohara (The Heart of No Place, 2009), is in preproduction. The feature film is executive-produced by Gareth Jones (Boiling Point, 2021), with soundtrack composed by Jono Podmore.
