= The Vampire (play) =

1820 play written by James Robinson Planché

The Vampire, formally known as The Vampire; or, The Bride of the Isles, is a play written by James Robinson Planché. It was premiered on the London stage in 1820 as the first appearance of the vampire as an image of sophistication and nobility.

== J. R. Planche's early life ==
James Robinson Planché (1796–1880) was an English playwright, costume designer, and a theatre antiquarian throughout the nineteenth century. Planché was born the son of Jacques Planché and Catherine Emily Planché (who were descendants of Huguenot refugees) on 17 February 1796 in Old Burlington St, Piccadilly, London. His mother Catherine Emily Planché home schooled him until the age of eight, and later transitioned his education to the Revd. Mr. Farrer's boarding school in Lawrence Street, Chelsea, where he studied for four years. Soon after his education finished, he studied geometry and perspective for two years under landscape painter M. De Court.

== J. R. Planche's career ==
Planché wrote his first play in 1816, Amoroso, King of Little Britain, a work intended to be performed at small private theatres amongst novices and growing artists. Two years later, Planché's play received considerable recognition from a popular comedian at the time, a John Pritt Harley, whom staged his work at the Drury Lane Theatre on 21 April 1818. At the time of its debut and critically acclaimed success, Planché was invited to the green room at Drury Lane where he was complimented for Amoroso, King of Little Britain’s well-admired performances, and was persuaded by John Harley and actor-managers Stephen Kemble & Robert William Elliston to pursue a career in playwriting. Planché pounced at their advice, and wrote several theatrical plays following Amoroso, to no success. After a fearful dry spell of successful work, Planché finally achieved success with the production of The Vampire, or The Bride of the Isles, performed at the Lyceum Theatre in August 1820.

== Production ==
Following Lord Byron’s novel, Fragment of a Novel, was John Polidori’s tale The Vampyre in 1819, soon to be adapted again, only this time as an adaption for the stage by Charles Nodier in his play Le Vampire, a French melodrama that was performed in Paris in June 1820 (Nunzia). J.R Planché’s The Vampire owes a great deal of its existence to the management of proprietor Samuel James Arnold. It was during this time in Planché’s career where he developed a strong interest in antiquarian practice, especially in regard to historical accuracy and the dramaturgy of a play’s origins.

Samuel Arnold had presented Charles Nodler’s Le Vampire to Planché in hopes for an adaption that he could put on the London stage at the Lyceum English Opera House. Planché accepted the contract, although he had some hesitance regarding the historical accuracy of the tale. He brought to Samuel a list of concerns regarding the play’s setting. In James Robinson Planché’s The Recollections and Reflections of J.R Planché, (Somerset Herald): A Professional Autobiography, Planché argued the play was historically inaccurate, stating confidently in his autobiography that it was wrong in “the scene of which it laid, with the usual recklessness of French dramatists, in Scotland, where the superstition never existed.” He continued to support his claims regarding the setting, arguing to “let me change it to some place east of Europe,” specifically in Hungary, where the superstition remained true. Samuel wouldn't budge on the matter, preferring that the adaption included “Scotch music and dresses”, which was a popular aesthetic at the time, and defended his preference by arguing that Scottish costumes and dress “were in stock” at the Lyceum. Planché went along with Samuel's requests, resulting in immediate success and fame despite his doubts. It wasn't until the summer of 1829 (nine years later) when Planché revived The Vampire with his “own ideas of propriety” again at the Lyceum by the same Samuel Arnold who produced it in 1820. The French melodrama was converted into an opera for the German stage, in which Planché “wrote the libretto, laid the scene of action in Hungary, where the superstition exists to this day, and in many other respects improved upon my earlier version.” He points out specifically that “the opera was extremely well sung, and the costumes novel as well as correct.”

== Cast of characters ==
- Lord Ruthven – an ancient vampire who marries and drains the blood of young women
- Lady Margaret – daughter of Lord Ronald and Lord Ruthven's intended
- Lord Ronald – father of Margaret, and best friends with Lord Ruthven
- Unda and Ariel – spirits who try to warn Margaret about the vampire
- Robert – middle-class man, friends with Ronald
- Effie – Robert's intended, a noblewoman
- Andrew – Effie's father
- Bridget – Lady Margaret's servant and confidante
- Bri, Richard, McSwill – lower class workers and servants
- chorus – various spirits and villagers

== Plot ==
=== Act One ===
The play begins in the Cave of Fingal on the Island of Staffa, in Scotland. Lady Margaret lies, asleep, as spirits attempt to warn her of the dangerous vampire who will try to kill her. The vampire then arrives, only to retreat due to the spirits interference. The next scene takes place in Lord Ronald's castle, where his workers are drinking and discussing Lady Margaret's disappearance and return. Rumors begin to circulate about a monster who must marry his victims in order to drain them of their blood. They say these monsters, called vampires, must do this constantly in order to keep living. They ignore the rumors and begin to talk of Earl of Marsden, said to arrive in the morning. He is supposed to marry Lady Margaret, and Robert is supposed to marry Effie on the same day.

The next scene shows Margaret talking to Bridget about falling asleep in cave after becoming lost. She saw an attractive man reach out to her, but his features grew monstrous, and she fled in terror, running straight into the rescue party looking for her. Margaret still feels uneasy about the events. Her father, Lord Ronald, enters, telling Margaret about the man she is going to marry. Ronald and Lord Ruthven had been friends long ago, and Ruthven had, according to Ronald, died protecting him. Ronald learned of his brother, the Earl of Marsden, and the two arranged a union between Lady Margret and the earl. The Earl of Marsden then arrives and is discovered to be Lord Ruthven. Margaret, recognizing the man to be the monster from last night, faints. Once she is revived, Ruthven uses his powers to bewitch her. The marriage is confirmed and Ruthven laments that he must kill Margaret to survive. When he learns of Effie, he attempts to bewitch her instead. She resists and he attempts to take her away, but Robert sees this and shoots Ruthven.

=== Act Two ===
Lord Ronald, who saw Ruthven get shot, becomes angered at Robert and leaves to tell Margaret the sad news. When he arrives, he discovers that Ruthven is already there, talking with Margaret. He is shocked to see him still alive, and attempts to tell others that Ruthven is dead. Lord Ruthven has him taken away by servants, claiming he is not well. With time running out for Ruthven to drain Margaret, he entices her to marry as soon as possible. Even though she is still upset about her father, Margaret agrees and prepares to be married before the sunrise. As they are led to the altar, Lord Ronald bursts in with Robert and others who believe Ruthven to be a vampire. Margaret runs to her father as Robert and Ruthven fight until the sun begins to rise. With Lord Ruthven's time up, he is struck down by lightning.

== Reimagining the vampire ==
Embedded deep within Eastern European legend loomed the morose creature of the Vampire. Roaming the hills often as a reanimated peasant, seeking the hot throbbing blood of the human being, this creature was hardly an attractive entity to its victims. Upon its initial premiere on the London stage at the Lyceum Theatre on 19 August 1820, J.R. Planche's gothic play, The Vampire existed as the first presentation of this acrimonious being as one who possessed great charm and elegance. Now with great attraction to onlookers did this new monster, re-imagined by Planche, move with the utmost ease into and out of his victims lives and with the greatest of trust did these victims befriend this monster based on only the celestial physical appearance possessed by the vampire. The novel persona of eloquent sophistication concealing the repugnant demon inside served as the incitement for the image of the modern day vampire. Other innovative elements (such as the location of the play and technological advancements of stage machinery) aided in the creation of this new personage through J.R. Planche's new vision of Gothic literature.

Inspired by English author John Polidori's gothic novel The Vampyre, written in 1819, Planche's play breathed life into this new character birthed from the writings of Polidori as Planche set him on the stage as a physical force with the capability of movement and thought. The reserved and aristocratic qualities of Lord Ruthven, the vampire in Planche's play, originally came to fruition out of English novelist Polidori's influence from the wealthy estranged hermit-like qualities of the romantic poet George Gordon Byron, or more commonly known as simply Lord Byron. Polidori first received the base of his story from Byron's unfinished story Fragment of a Story, which had been conceived and written in haste during a rainy weekend spent at Byron's with Mary Shelley, her husband (Percy Bysshe Shelley), Polidori, and Byron in which the four challenged each other to write a ghost story and from the romantically fueled words of Byron, the eternal demon of blood lust first emerged from the spoken tales of Eastern European myth and onto the written pages of English literature. Polidori then grounded his novel in Byron's work and fashioned out of Byron's sophisticated and yet queer character, the vampire, as the beginning of what gothic literature characterized as the devilishly veiled noblemen. Planche then adapted Polidori's character and in a theatrical innovation, made him walk the histrionic boards cloaked in the noble façade of Lord Ruthven emerging from the grotesque form the European myth had formerly placed on him.

== Technological innovations ==
On the intrigue of invention to increase this spectacle, Planche created a stage mechanism which was fostered out of his own desire to have a trap-door in the Lyceum Theatre. This trap, otherwise known as the vampire-trap (because it gave expedited stage entry and exit to the vampire), operated on a mechanically innovative system. This trap-door was composed of two flaps in the stage, usually made from Indian rubber, in which the occasion should arise where pressure should be applied to these two flaps they would give way and allow the subject creating the pressure to drop beneath the stage. This trap-door proved to be of great importance to the play, for the sole reason that it was the solitary cause for Planche to write the play (to install this ingenious piece of stage machinery into the stage of the Lyceum).
