= Ada Reis =

1823 novel by Lady Caroline Lamb

- Author: Lady Caroline Lamb
- Language: English
- Genre: Romance
- Publisher: John Murray
- Publication date: 1823
- Publication place: United Kingdom
- Media type: Print

Ada Reis is an 1823 novel by the British writer Lady Caroline Lamb published in three volumes. It was her third novel and was published by John Murray. It was published six months after her previous work Graham Hamilton.

It did not achieve the notoriety of her debut novel Glenarvon, which contained a thinly-disguised portrait of her former lover Lord Byron, although the protagonist Ada Reis has some Byronic elements. Critical reception of the novel was mixed and Caroline's sister-in-law Emily described it as "a strange farrago".

== Bibliography ==
- Eckert, Linsey. The Limits of Familiarity: Authorship and Romantic Readers. Bucknell University Press, 2022.
- Fraser, Antonia. Lady Caroline Lamb: A Free Spirit. Weidenfeld & Nicolson, 2023.
