= Hoyland (surname) =

Hoyland is a surname. Notable people with the surname include:

- Jamie Hoyland (born 1966), English footballer and manager
- John Hoyland (disambiguation), multiple people
- Robert G. Hoyland (born 1966), British historian
- Tommy Hoyland (born 1932), English footballer
- Vic Hoyland (born 1945), English classical composer
- William Hoyland (born 1943), English actor
