= Lord Ruthven (vampire) =

Fictional character

Lord Ruthven (/ˈrɪvən/) is a fictional character. First appearing in print in 1819, in John William Polidori's "The Vampyre", he was one of the first vampires in English literature. The name Ruthven was taken from Lady Caroline Lamb's Glenarvon (1816), where it was used as an unflattering parody of Lord Byron, while the character was based on Augustus Darvell from Byron's "Fragment of a Novel" (1819). "The Vampyre" was written privately, and published without Polidori's consent, with revisions to the story made by Polidori for an unpublished second edition showing that he planned to change the name from Ruthven to Strongmore. The initial popularity of "The Vampyre" led to the character appearing in many translations and adaptations, including plays and operas, and Ruthven has continued to appear in modern works. The Lord Ruthven Award (1989–present) by the Lord Ruthven Assembly is named after the character.

== Origins ==
Crest badge of Clan Ruthven

There is a genuine title of Lord Ruthven of Freeland in the Peerage of Scotland, which is now a subsidiary title of the Earl of Carlisle in the United Kingdom. At the time "The Vampyre" was written, the title was held by James Ruthven, 7th Lord Ruthven of Freeland, though the fictional character is not related to the historical title holders.

The name Ruthven was used for the title character in the 1816 Gothic novel Glenarvon by Lady Caroline Lamb. This character was based on the genuine Lord Byron and was not a vampire. Lady Caroline was a former lover of Lord Byron's and the novel did not offer a flattering portrait.

The character of Lord Ruthven in John William Polidori's "The Vampyre" was based on Augustus Darvell in Byron's "Fragment of a Novel".

In a copy of "The Vampyre" annotated by Polidori—presumably for a revised second edition of the book which was never published—the author changed the name of the vampire from "Lord Ruthven" to "Lord Strongmore".

== "The Vampyre" ==
Lord Ruthven appeared as the title character in the 1819 short story "The Vampyre". This had been written in 1816 by Dr. John William Polidori, the traveling doctor of Lord Byron. It was published in the April 1, 1819 edition of The New Monthly Magazine. The publishers falsely attributed the authorship to Byron. Both Byron and Polidori disputed this attribution. In the following issue, dated May 1, 1819, Polidori wrote a letter to the editor explaining "that though the groundwork is certainly Lord Byron's, its development is mine."

In the story, Aubrey meets the mysterious Lord Ruthven at a social event when he comes to London. After briefly getting to know Ruthven, Aubrey agrees to go travelling around Europe with him. Aubrey slowly realizes that Ruthven delights in causing the ruin and degradation of others, and after Ruthven attempts to seduce the daughter of a mutual acquaintance near Rome, then Aubrey leaves in disgust. Alone, Aubrey travels to Greece where he falls in love with an innkeeper's daughter, Ianthe. She tells him about the legends of the vampire, which are very popular in the area, and Aubrey recognises that Ruthven fits the physical description.

This romance is short-lived: Ianthe is killed, her throat torn open by an attacker who injures Aubrey and leaves behind an unusual dagger. The whole town believes it to be the work of an evil vampire. Aubrey falls ill, but is found and nursed back to health by Ruthven. Although suspicious of the man, Aubrey feels obliged to Ruthven and rejoins him in his travels. The pair are attacked by bandits on the road and Ruthven is mortally wounded. On his deathbed, Ruthven makes Aubrey swear an oath that he will not speak of Ruthven or his death for a year and a day, and once Aubrey agrees, Lord Ruthven dies laughing. Amongst Ruthven's belongings Aubrey discovers a sheath which matches the dagger found by Ianthe's body.

Aubrey returns to London and is amazed when Ruthven appears shortly thereafter, alive and well. Ruthven reminds Aubrey of his oath, and although Aubrey wants to warn others of Ruthven's character, he feels unable to break his oath. Helpless to protect his sister from Ruthven, Aubrey has a nervous breakdown. Upon recovering, Aubrey learns that Ruthven has inherited an earldom and is engaged to his sister, and they are due to be married on the day that his oath will end. Unable to delay the wedding, Aubrey has a stroke. That night, his oath expired, Aubrey relates the entire story before dying. But it is too late: Ruthven has disappeared, leaving his new wife dead and drained of blood.

His character is one typical of the gothic genre and vampires in general. His vampire character is alluring and sexual, but is also linked with horror and supernatural terror.

== Subsequent appearances ==
The story was an immediate success and several other authors quickly adapted the character of Lord Ruthven into other works. Cyprien Bérard wrote an 1820 novel, Lord Ruthwen ou les Vampires, which was falsely attributed to Charles Nodier. Nodier himself wrote an 1820 play, Le Vampire, which was adapted back into English for the London stage by James Robinson Planché as The Vampire, or The Bride of the Isles. At least four other stage versions of the story also appeared in 1820.

In 1828, Heinrich August Marschner and W. A. Wohlbrück adapted the story into a German opera, Der Vampyr. A second German opera with the same title was written in 1828 by Peter Josef von Lindpaintner and Cäsar Max Heigel, but the vampire in Lindpaintner's opera was named Aubri, not Ruthven. Dion Boucicault revived the character in his 1852 play The Vampire: A Phantasm, and played the title role during its long run. Alexandre Dumas, père also used the character in an 1852 play. Ruthven (1859), a play by Augustus Glossop Harris, expands the story, including the death of Ruthven.

In The Count of Monte Cristo (1844), the main character Edmond Dantès is often referred to as Lord Ruthven by a countess. The countess incorrectly attributes the creation of Ruthven to Byron.

A Lord Ruthven also appeared in the Swedish novel Vampyren (1848), the first published work by author and poet Viktor Rydberg; as the story unfolds, it becomes clear that he is inspired by him in name only. This Ruthven is not a supernatural being, but a lunatic believing himself to be a vampire.

A comical "Sir Ruthven Murgatroyd" is the main character of Gilbert and Sullivan's Ruddigore (1887). In it, the pastoral Robin Oakapple finds that he is descended from an evil uncle and is forced to take up his ancestor's evil ways.

Lord Ruthven served as the inspiration for a 1945 film, The Vampire's Ghost, which was adapted into comic book format in 1973.

Ruthven has appeared in several comic books by Marvel and DC Comics. Originally, he appeared in the first issue of Marvel's Vampire Tales (1973), as the possessor of the mystical book called Darkhold. Ruthven also appeared in some Superman comics, notably in Superman: The Man of Steel #14 (1992) and #42 (1995) and Superman #70 (1992). An incidental character called Ruthven appears in later issues of Neil Gaiman's The Sandman comic (1989–); this Ruthven is a man with a rabbit's head, as well as prominent "vampire" fangs.

Lord Ruthven appears as a main character in Nancy Garden's young adult book Prisoner of Vampires (1985). In this story, Ruthven uses the name "Radu" and is a relation and helper of both Count Dracula and Carmilla.

Lord Ruthven also appears in the background of the Vampire: The Masquerade (1991) game system, under the name Lambach Ruthven.

Kim Newman uses the character of Lord Ruthven in his alternate history Anno Dracula series (1992–), having Ruthven serve as the Conservative prime minister after Count Dracula seizes the English throne. Ruthven holds the premiership from c. 1886 until 1940, when he loses it to Winston Churchill. Ruthven later reclaims it following the war, losing it to Churchill again after the Suez Crisis. Ruthven later serves as Home Secretary under Margaret Thatcher and is poised to take over as prime minister again following her departure.

A Lord Ruthven also exists in Tom Holland's novel, Lord of the Dead (1995). Lord Ruthven is actually Lord Byron.

Lord Ruthven appears as the boss of the Manor of Immortals dungeon in the bullet-hell MMO shoot 'em up Realm of the Mad God (2010–). In the game, Ruthven is a Vampire King, one of the most loyal commanders of Oryx the Mad God (the game's main antagonist), and is said to be behind the phenomenon known as "lag".

A vampire named Ruthven appears in the 2012 film Byzantium, played by Jonny Lee Miller.

Ruthven appears in Perry Lake's The Legend of Dracula series (2014), where he is named Francis Ruthven.

A vampire character called August Ruthven appears in the anime and manga series The Case Study of Vanitas (2015–).

Ruthven and Sir Francis Varney are two of the main characters in Vivian Shaw's Strange Practice (2017) and its sequels. In this series, Ruthven's full name is Edmund Ruthven.

A human Lord Ruthven appears in the BBC television series Dracula (2020).

Lord Ruthven was also mentioned in passing in the animated television series Castlevania: Nocturne (2023) as an enemy of Juste Belmont.

Lord Ruthven is the primary antagonist in the novel Adam 315 by Dani Lebeaux (2023).
