= Graham Hamilton (novel) =

1822 novel

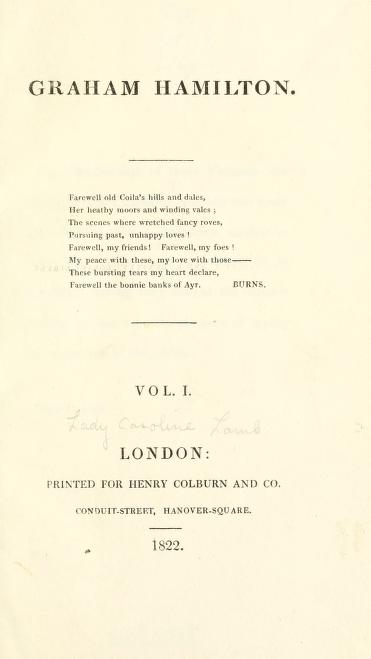
- Author: Lady Caroline Lamb
- Language: English
- Genre: Drama
- Publisher: Henry Colburn
- Publication date: 1822
- Publication place: United Kingdom
- Media type: Print

Graham Hamilton is an 1822 two volume novel by the Anglo-Irish writer Lady Caroline Lamb. Her second novel to be published following her 1816 debut Glenarvon, it mocks and attacks the Whig high society in which she had been raised. It was published anonymously by Henry Colburn. Her husband William (a future prime minister) assisted by proofreading the drafts. Lamb was a noted figure of the Regency era who had caused a scandal with her tempestuous affair with Lord Byron. Her debut novel Glenarvon had been a thinly-disguised depiction of him.

== Bibliography ==
- Fraser, Antonia. Lady Caroline Lamb: A Free Spirit. Weidenfeld & Nicolson, 2023.
- Macdonald, D L & McWhir, Anne. The Broadview Anthology of Literature of the Revolutionary Period 1770-1832. Broadview Press, 2010.
