= The Combat of the Giaour and Hassan =

Three paintings by Eugène Delacroix

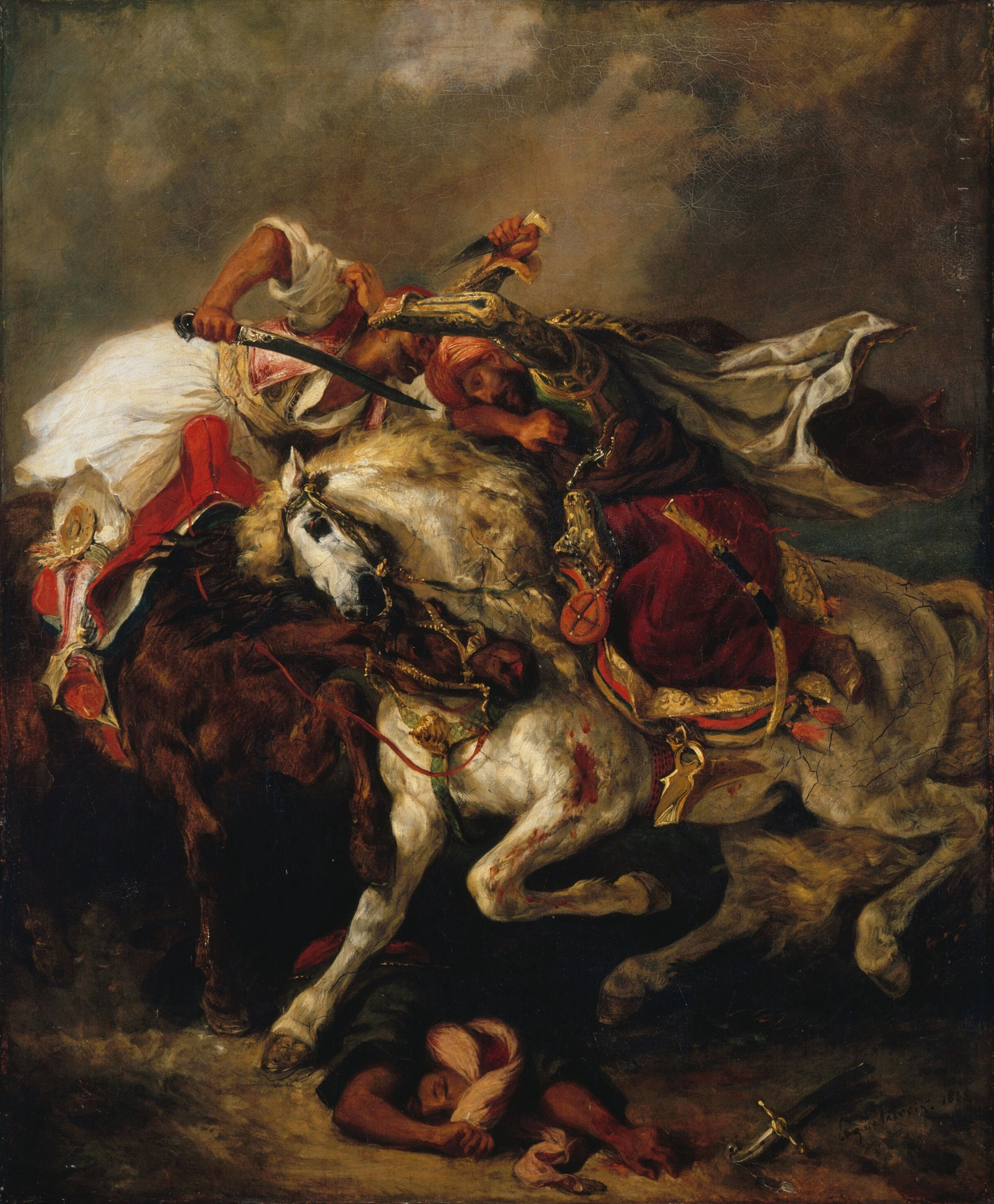
The Combat of the Giaour and Hassan (1835) by Eugène Delacroix

The Combat of the Giaour and Hassan is the title of three works by the French Romantic painter Eugène Delacroix, produced in 1826, 1835 and 1856. They all show a scene from Lord Byron's 1813 poem The Giaour, with the Giaour ambushing and killing Hassan, the Pasha, before retiring to a monastery. Giaour had fallen in love with Leila, a slave in Hassan's harem, but Hassan had discovered this and had her killed.

== 1826 version ==
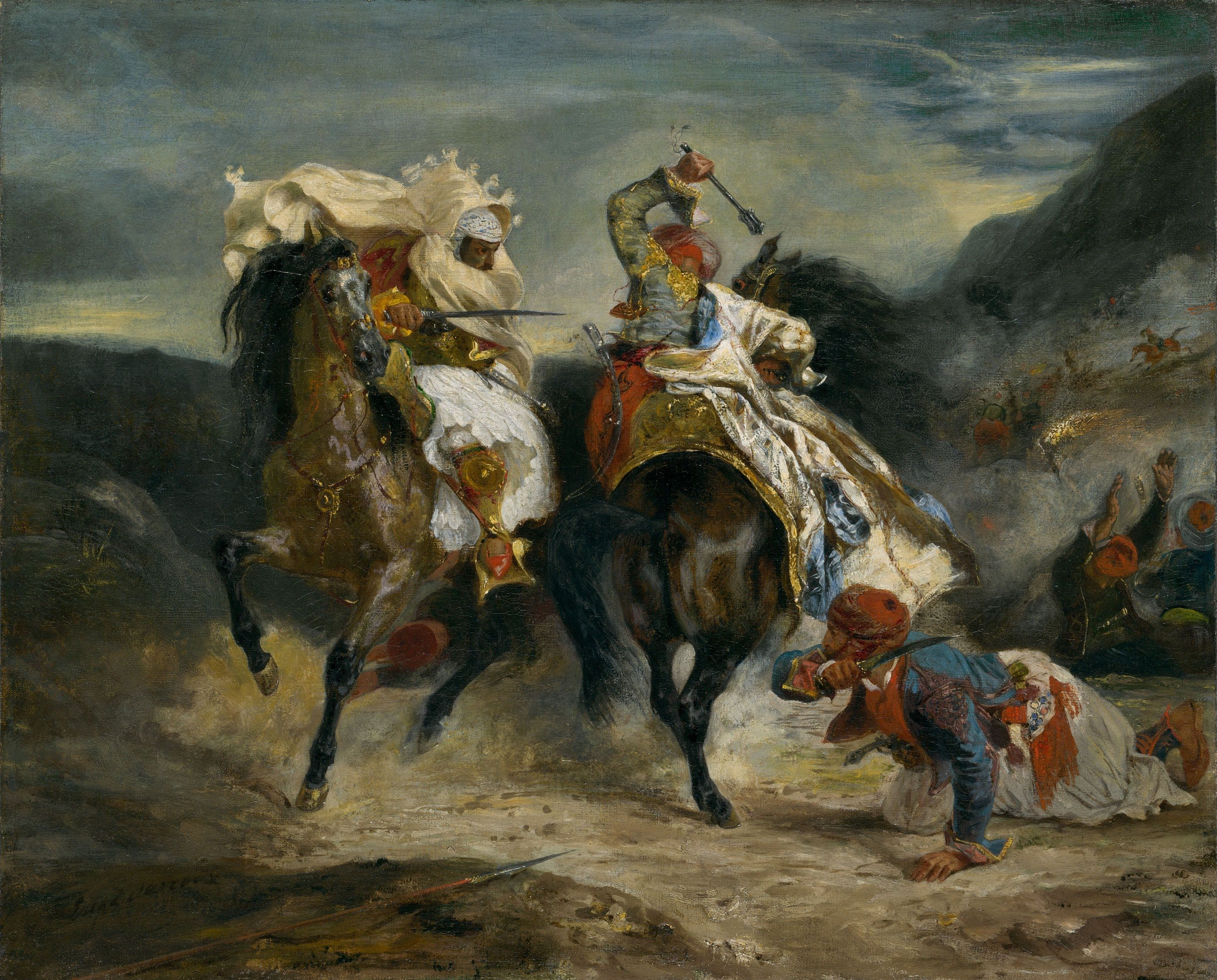
1826 version

In 1824, Delacroix recorded in his diary his experience of reading The Giaour and Childe Harold's Pilgrimage, probably in their 1819–1824 French translations by Amédée Pichot. In 1826, Delacroix completed his first painting of the combat of Giaour and Hassan, showing the two on horseback, fighting in a gorge. A Turk escorting Hassan kneels beside the Giaour's horse, trying to cut its legs with his knife.

This version was acquired by the Art Institute of Chicago in 1962.

== 1835 version ==
Now in the Petit Palais in Paris, the second version. Unlike the 1826 version, it focuses entirely on the two riders.

== 1856 version ==
This work is a variant of the two previous versions.
