= John Hoyland (disambiguation) =

John Hoyland was a British artist.

John Hoyland may also refer to:

- John Hoyland (American football) (born 2003), American football player
- John Hoyland (organist) (1783–1827), English organist and composer
- John Hoyland (writer) (1750–1831), English Quaker author, known as a writer on the Romani people
