= Johann Heinrich Abicht =

German philosopher (1762–1816)

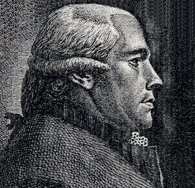
J.H. Abicht

Johann Heinrich Abicht (4 May 1762 – 28 April 1816) was a German philosopher.

== Biography ==
Abicht was born at Volkstedt (now part of Rudolstadt). His grandfather was teacher and organist in Wilmersdorf, Gehren, and his father was a teacher in Volkstedt. Johann Abicht himself finished the college in Rudolstadt and visited the University of Erlangen in 1781. In 1784 he became controller at the house of chief equerry von Schall in Öhringen. Abicht made his magister in 1786 and his doctor in philosophy in 1790. In the same year, he was appointed adjunct and then extraordinary professor in the philosophical faculty. He became regular professor in 1796. On 4 August 1804 he was appointed professor of logic and metaphysics at the newly reorganised university of Wilna. He died at Wilna, aged 53.

His philosophy is clearly influenced by Kant, later by Karl Leonhard Reinhold.

== Publications ==
- De philosophiae Kantianae ad theologiam habitu, 1788
- Versuch einer Metaphysik des Vergnügens nach Kantischen Grundsätzen zur Grundlegung einer systematischen Thelematologie und Moral, 1789
- Philosophie der Erkenntnisse, 1791
- Hermias, oder Auflösung der die gültige Elementarphilosophie betreffenden Aenesidemischen Zweifel, 1794
- Neues philosophisches Magazin zur Erläuterung und Anwendung des Kantischen Systems, 1789–1790, collaboration with Friedrich Gottlob Born.
- Philosophisches Journal, 4 volumes, 1794–1795, collaboration

== Sources ==
- Allgemeine Deutsche Biographie - online version at Wikisource
