= Whittaker Magna Carta =

1816 book

In 1816, the London bookbinder John Whittaker (also described as a bookseller or associated with other book-related occupations) produced a luxury edition of Magna Carta on its 600th anniversary. It was officially styled Magna Carta Regis Johannis XV. Die Junii Anno Regni XVII.

The text of Whittaker's Magna Carta was in gold. Copies in the small edition were intended for the king and other nobles; George III and either John Lambton, 1st Earl of Durham, or his son, were known to have copies. Different copies use different materials: some are printed on vellum, others on satin or paper. About 40 were auctioned in the 20th century. Thomas Frognall Dibdin described Whittaker's Magna Carta as "gorgeous and truly unrivalled" in Bibliographical Decameron.

== Works cited ==
- Friend, William L. (1944). "Magna Carta in Gold". Quarterly Journal of Current Acquisitions. 1 (4): 39–42. ISSN 0090-0095. JSTOR 29780350.
- Gregory, James (3 May 2018). "The 'Fancy for Fine Printing': Collecting Whittaker's Golden Magna Carta". In Bautz, Annika; Gregory, James (eds.). Libraries, Books, and Collectors of Texts, 1600–1900. Routledge. doi:10.4324/9780429489600. ISBN 978-0-429-48960-0.
- Maggs, Bryan (2000). "John Whittaker's Edition of the Magna Carta, Its Printing, and His Bindings on the Wormsley Copies". In Pearson, David (ed.). For the Love of the Binding: Studies in Bookbinding History Presented to Mirjam Foot. London: British Library; Oak Knoll Press. ISBN 1-58456-035-5. OCLC 45024505.
