= Sleep and Poetry =

Poem by John Keats

"Sleep and Poetry" (1816) is a poem by the English Romantic poet John Keats. It was started late one evening while staying the night at Leigh Hunt's cottage. It is often cited as a clear example of Keats's bower-centric poetry, yet it contains lines that make such a simplistic reading problematic, such as: "First the realm I'll pass/Of Flora, and old Pan ... I must pass them for a nobler life,/Where I may find the agonies, the strife /Of human hearts" (101–102; 123–125).

Furthermore, Keats defends his early "bower-centric" subject matter, which hearkens back to the classical poetic tradition of Homer and Virgil. Keats mounts an attack against Alexander Pope and many of his own fellow Romantic poets by downplaying their poetic departures into the imaginary: "with a puling infant's force/They sway'd about upon a rocking horse,/And thought it Pegasus. Ah dismal soul'd!" (185–7). Although written in simplistic rhyming couplets, the gradual turn towards inwardness serves as an important anticipation for Keats's later poetry.

== Excerpt ==
The poem begins:

What is more gentle than a wind in summer?
What is more soothing than the pretty hummer
That stays one moment in an open flower,
And buzzes cheerily from bower to bower?
What is more tranquil than a musk-rose blowing
In a green island, far from all men's knowing?
More healthful than the leafiness of dales?
More secret than a nest of nightingales?
More serene than Cordelia's countenance?
More full of visions than a high romance?
What, but thee Sleep? Soft closer of our eyes!
Low murmurer of tender lullabies!
Light hoverer around our happy pillows!
Wreather of poppy buds, and weeping willows!
Silent entangler of a beauty's tresses!
Most happy listener! when the morning blesses
Thee for enlivening all the cheerful eyes
That glance so brightly at the new sun-rise.

— lines 1-18
