= Zapolya (play) =

1815-16 play by Samuel Taylor Coleridge

Zapolya: A Christmas Tale, in Two Parts: The Prelude Entitled "The Usurper's Fortune;" and the Sequel Entitled "The Usurper's Fate."
- Author: Samuel Taylor Coleridge
- Language: English
- Genre: Play in verse form
- Set in: Illyria
- Publisher: Printed [by Samuel Curtis] for Rest Fenner, Paternoster Row
- Publication date: 1817
- Publication place: London, England, United Kingdom
- Media type: Hardcover
- Pages: 128
- OCLC: 3180304

Zapolya: A Christmas Tale is a verse play in two parts by Samuel Taylor Coleridge written in December 1815 and January 1816. It was Coleridge's last play and, like Osorio, was rejected by Theatre Royal, Drury Lane. It received its first performance in a production by Thomas Dibdin at the Surrey Theatre in 1816.

== Plot ==
The first part of the drama presents Raab Kiuprili, a heroic chieftain who confronts Emerick, the usurper of the crown of Illyria. Casimir, Kiuprili's son, turns against his father as a result of Emerick's deceit. Kiuprili is imprisoned with the deposed queen, Zapolya, but they escape with her son and rightful heir, Prince Andreas. In the second part, Zapolya is forced to live in the forest and is separated from Andreas, who is raised as a peasant by Old Bathory, a mountaineer. The play culminates in the defeat of Emerick and the reunification of Zapolya and Andreas. Kiuprili and Casimir are also reconciled.

== Analysis ==
The play is manifestly influenced by Shakespeare's "romances", in particular the tragicomedies The Winter's Tale and Cymbeline; Coleridge introduced the play as a 'dramatic poem... in humble imitation of the Winter's Tale'. Both Cymbeline and The Winter's Tale are concerned with usurpation and both feature the raising of rightful heirs in wild or pastoral environments. Coleridge probably used William Coxe's History of the House of Austria and Carolus Franciscus Palma's Notitia rerum Hungaricarum as historical sources for the setting of the play. Zapolya's character of Pestalutz, an assassin in the employ of Emerick, derives his name and profession from Schiller's Death of Wallenstein.

A reviewer of Dibdin's production in 1816 wrote that Zapolya was "of too serious a cast for the frequenters of this Theatre, and were we not fearful of giving offence we should say too good, at any rate we may be allowed to pronounce it too poetical".
