= Villa Diodati =

Mansion at Lake Geneva

Coordinates: 46°13′13″N 6°11′0″E

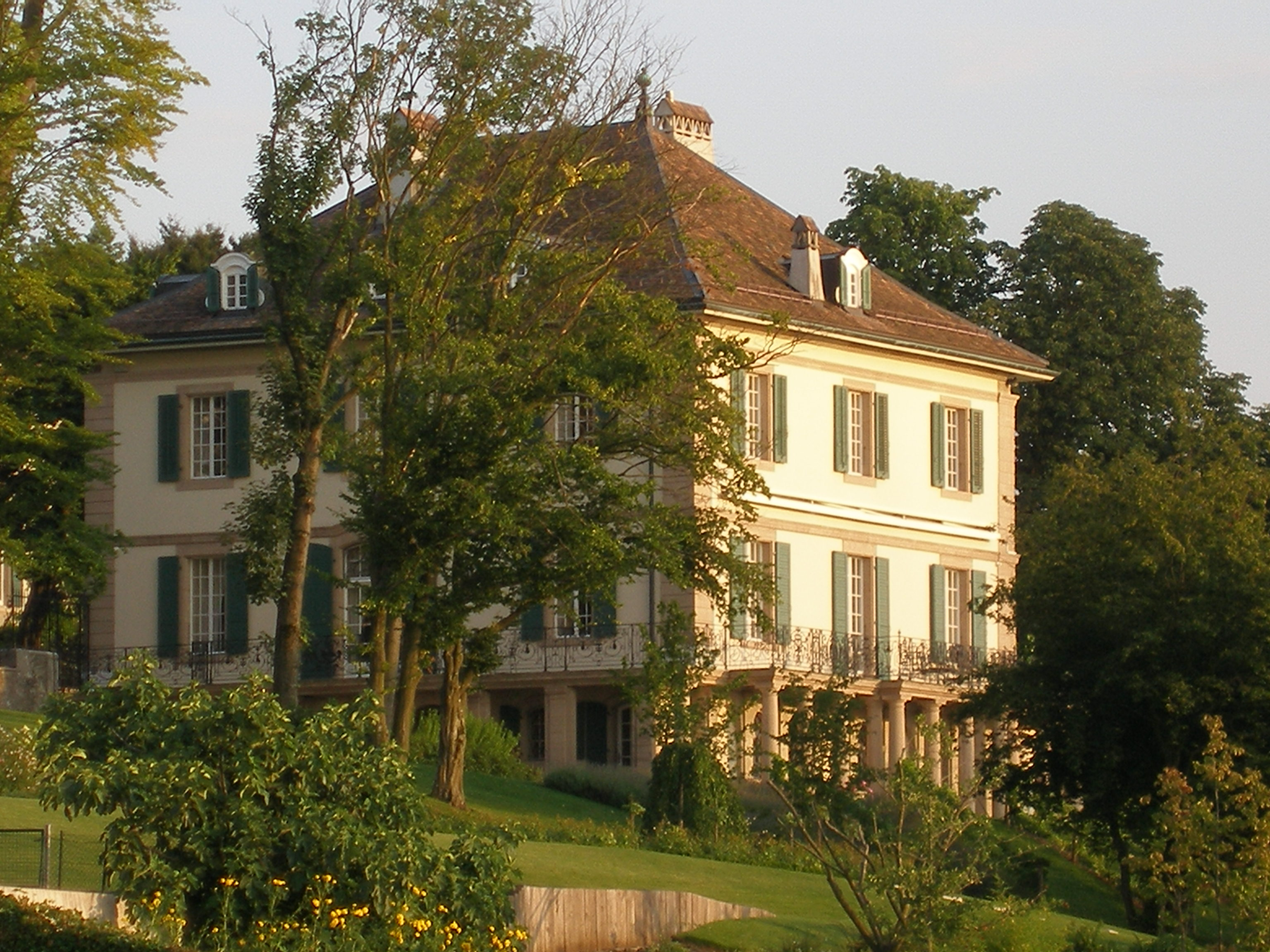
The Villa Diodati

The Villa Diodati is a mansion in the village of Cologny near Lake Geneva in Switzerland, notable because Lord Byron rented it and stayed there with Dr. John Polidori in the summer of 1816. Percy Bysshe Shelley, Shelley's partner Mary Godwin (later Mary Shelley), and Mary’s stepsister Claire Clairmont, who had rented a house nearby, were frequent visitors. Because of poor weather, in June 1816 the group famously spent three days together inside the house creating stories to tell each other, two of which were developed into landmark works of the Gothic horror genre: Frankenstein by Mary Shelley and The Vampyre, the first modern vampire story, by Polidori.

== Origin ==
Originally called the "Villa Belle Rive", Byron named it the Villa Diodati after the family that owned it. The family was distantly related to Italian translator Giovanni Diodati, uncle of Charles Diodati, the close friend of poet John Milton. Despite the presence of a plaque at the Villa heralding a supposed visit of Milton in 1638, in fact the villa was not built until 1710, long after Milton's death.

== Summer of 1816 ==
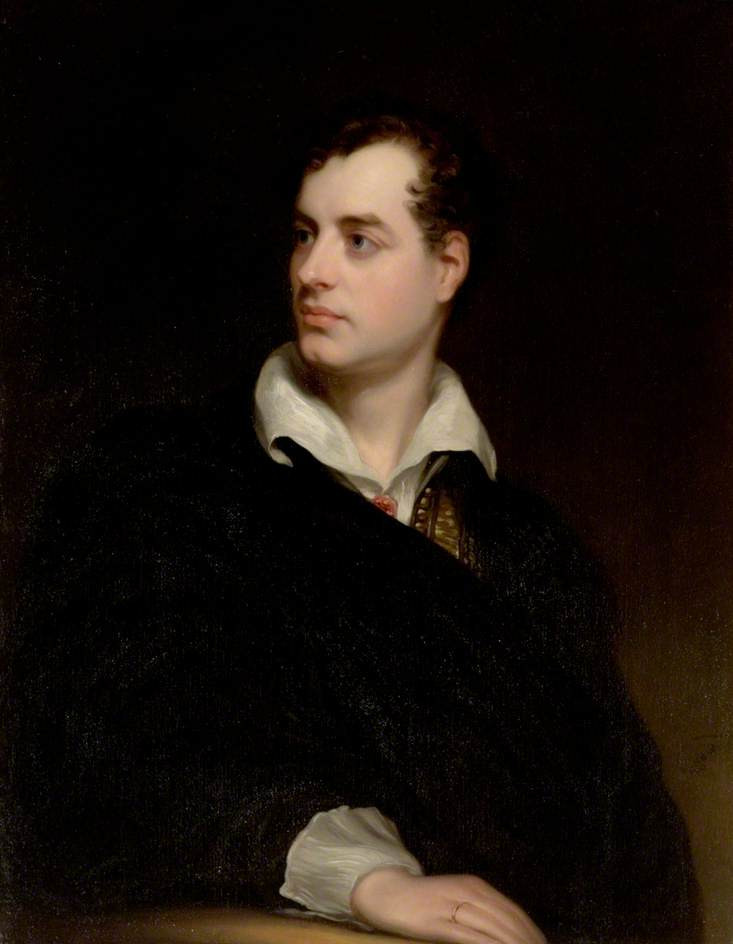
Portrait of Lord Byron by Thomas Phillips

Lord Byron rented the villa from 10 June to 1 November 1816. The scandal of his separation from his wife, rumours of an affair with his half-sister, and ever-increasing debt, had forced him to leave England, never to return, in April of that year. Byron arrived at Lake Geneva in May where he met and befriended the poet Percy Bysshe Shelley who was travelling with his future wife Mary Godwin (now better known as Mary Shelley). Byron settled at the Villa Diodati with his personal physician, John William Polidori, and Shelley rented a smaller house called "Maison Chapuis" on the waterfront nearby. The group was also joined by Mary's stepsister, Claire Clairmont, with whom Byron had had an affair in London.

The weather was unseasonably cold and stormy, and Mary Shelley later described the "incessant rain" of that "wet, ungenial summer". (Note: The storms and unseasonably cold weather resulted in 1816 being referred to as the Year Without a Summer. It is now known that the exceptional global weather conditions that year were caused by the volcanic eruption of Mount Tambora in Indonesia.) When the rain kept them indoors at the Villa Diodati over three days in June, the five turned to reading fantastical stories, including Fantasmagoriana, and then devising their own tales. Mary Shelley wrote the first draft of what would become Frankenstein, or The Modern Prometheus. She was just 18 years old at the time. Polidori was inspired by a fragmentary story of Byron's, Fragment of a Novel, to produce The Vampyre, the progenitor of the Romantic vampire genre.

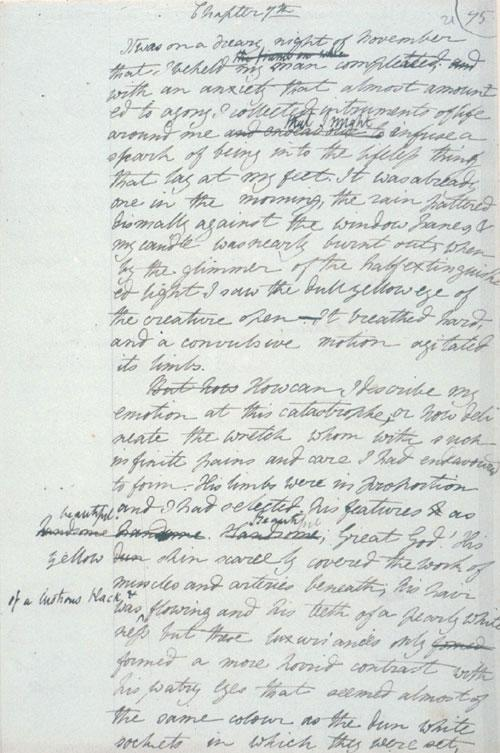
Mary Shelley's manuscript draft of Frankenstein begun at the Villa Diodati, with marginal notes by Percy Bysshe Shelley

Byron's Fragment of a Novel was published as a postscript to Mazeppa; he also wrote the third canto of Childe Harold.

== Subsequent history ==
After Byron's death, the Villa Diodati soon became a place of pilgrimage for devotees of Byron, and of Romanticism. The French writer Honoré de Balzac, who had become obsessed with the villa, had one of the characters in his 1836 novel Albert Savarus remark that the Villa Diodati is "now visited by everybody, just like Coppet and Ferney" (the homes of Madame de Staël and Voltaire respectively).

The villa has remained in private ownership. In 1945, the French artist Balthus moved into the property for a short period. The columnist Taki has written that when he visited the Villa Diodati in 1963 with the Belgian tennis player Philippe Washer it was then owned by the latter's family. However, the New York Times has reported that, as of 2011, the villa had been split up into "luxury apartments".

== Gallery ==
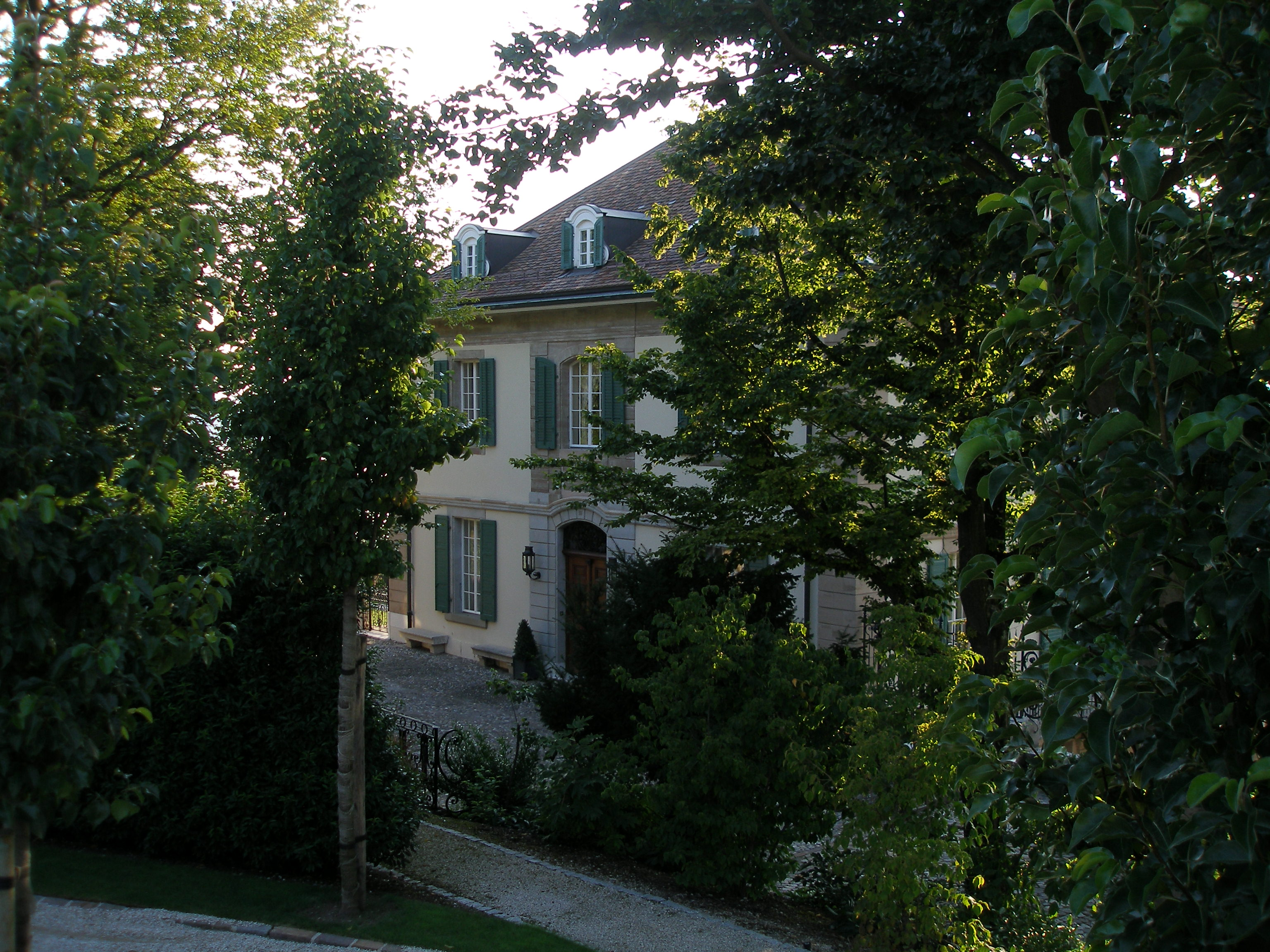

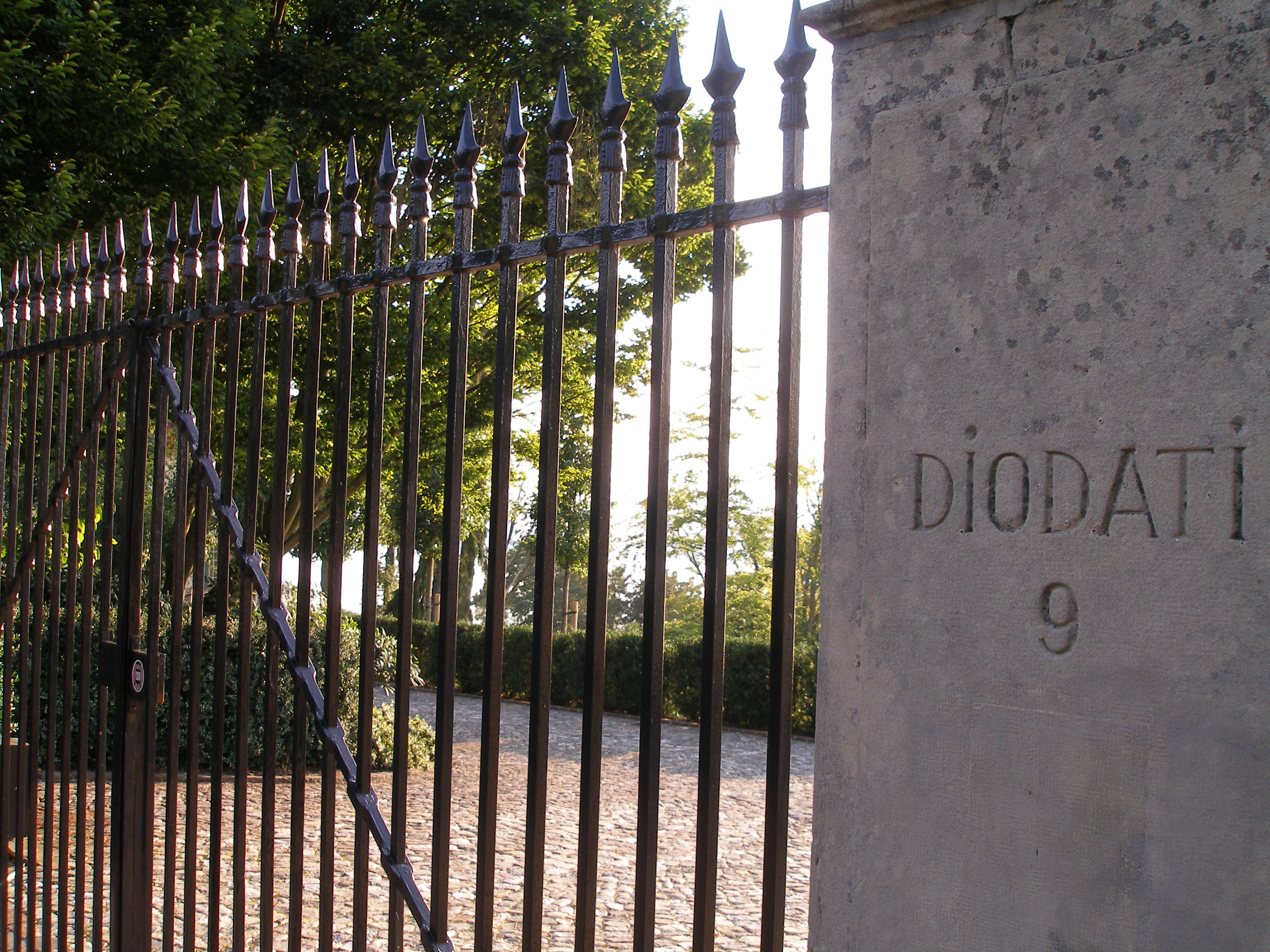

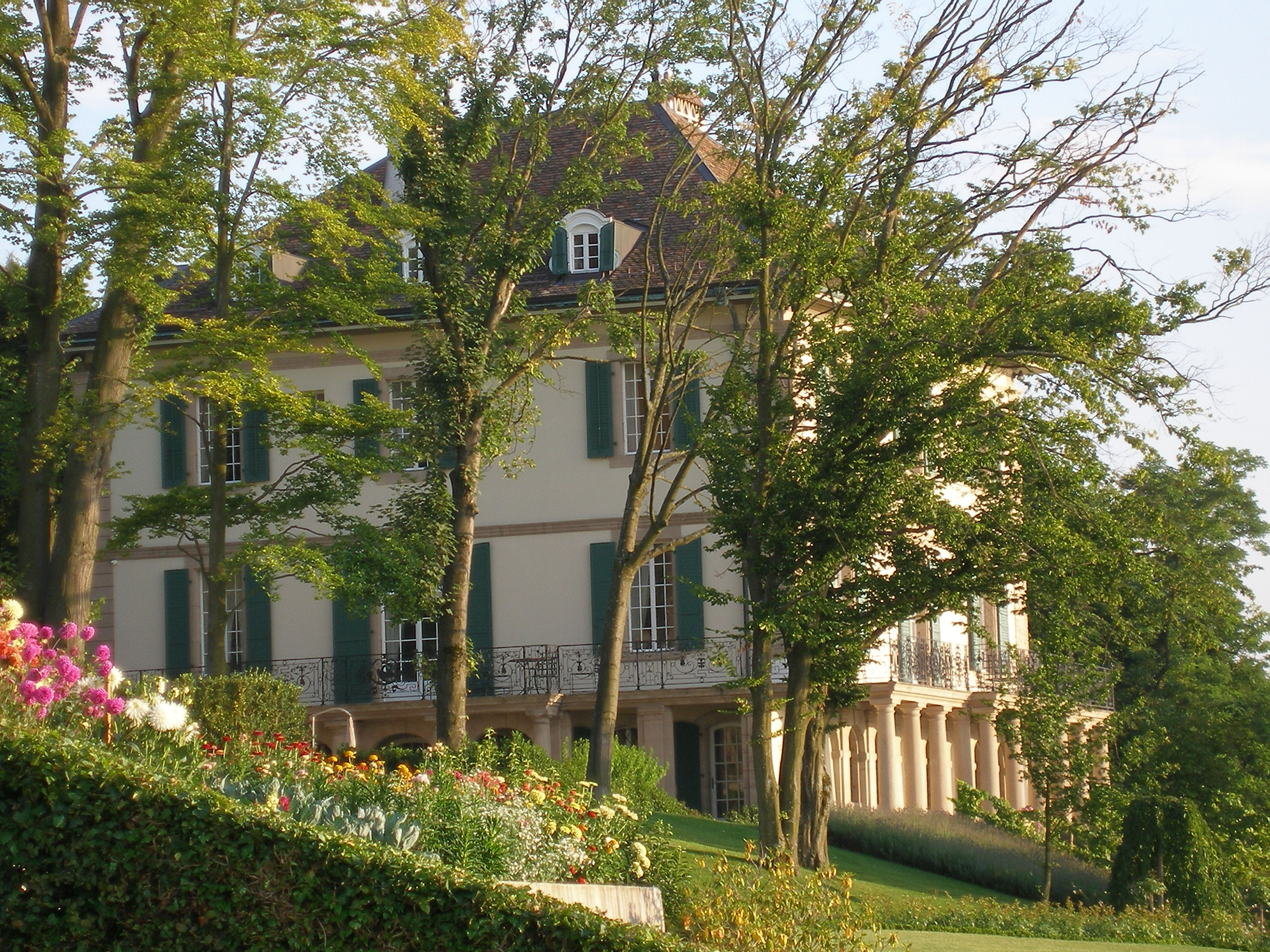

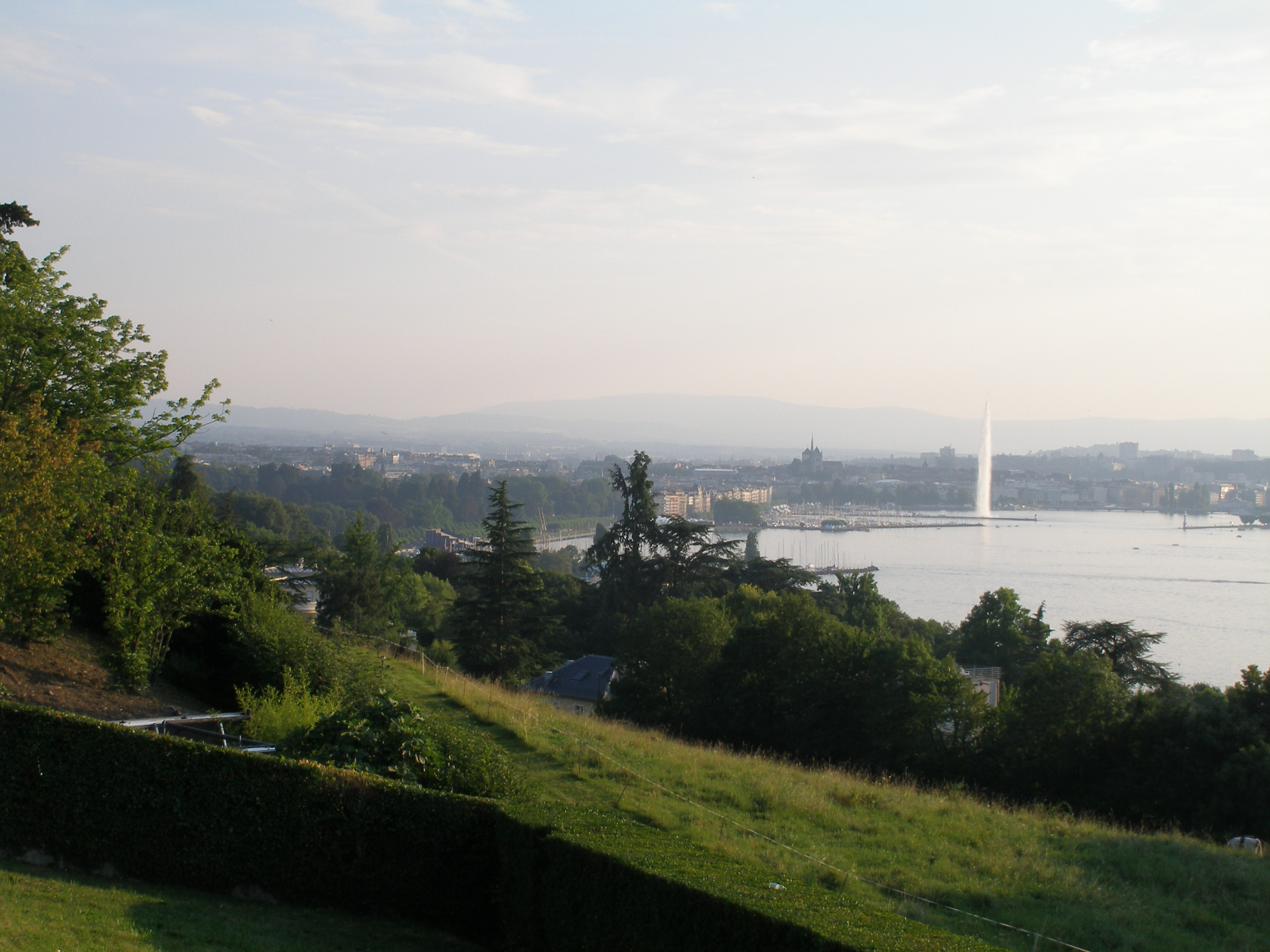

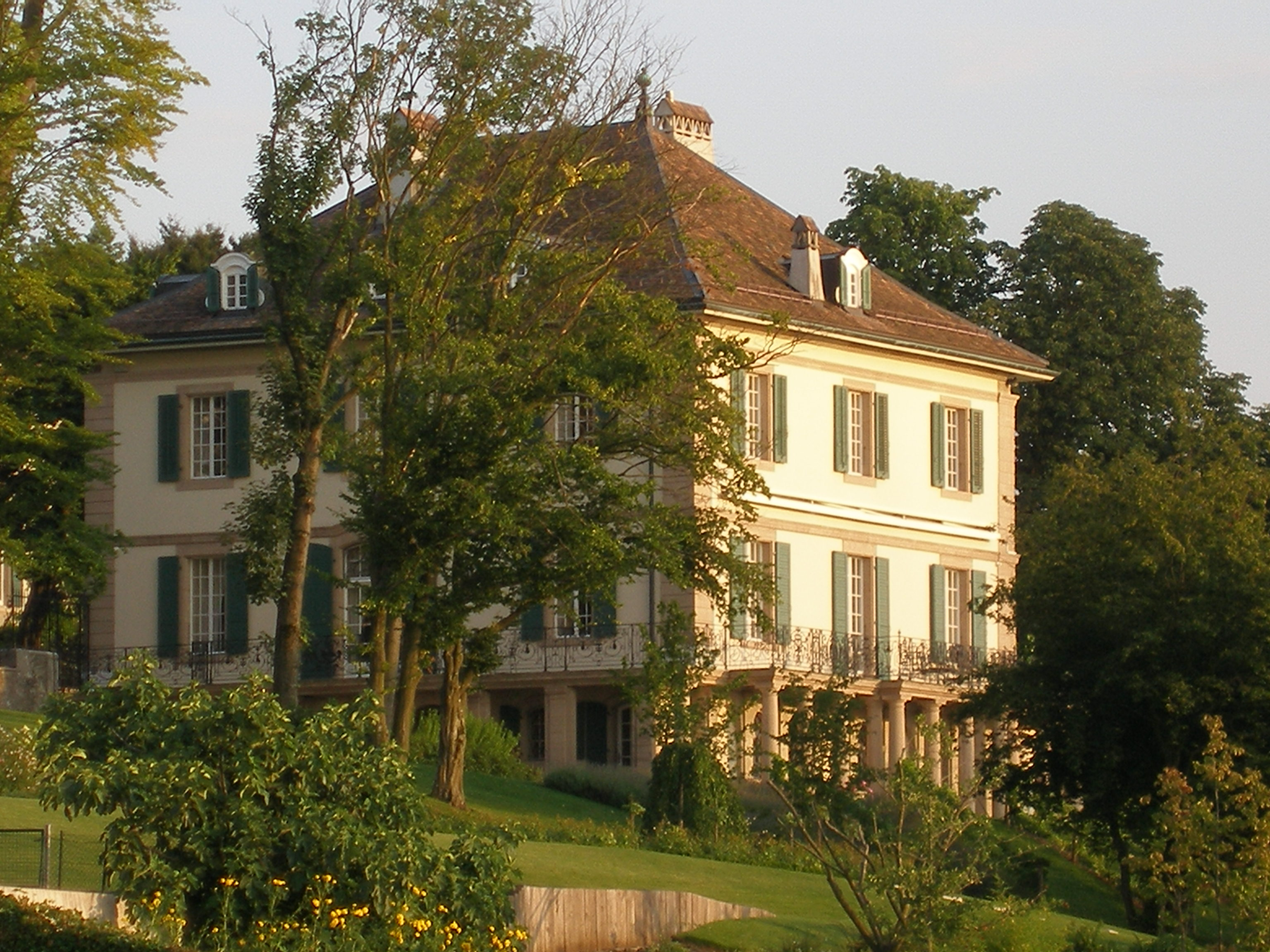

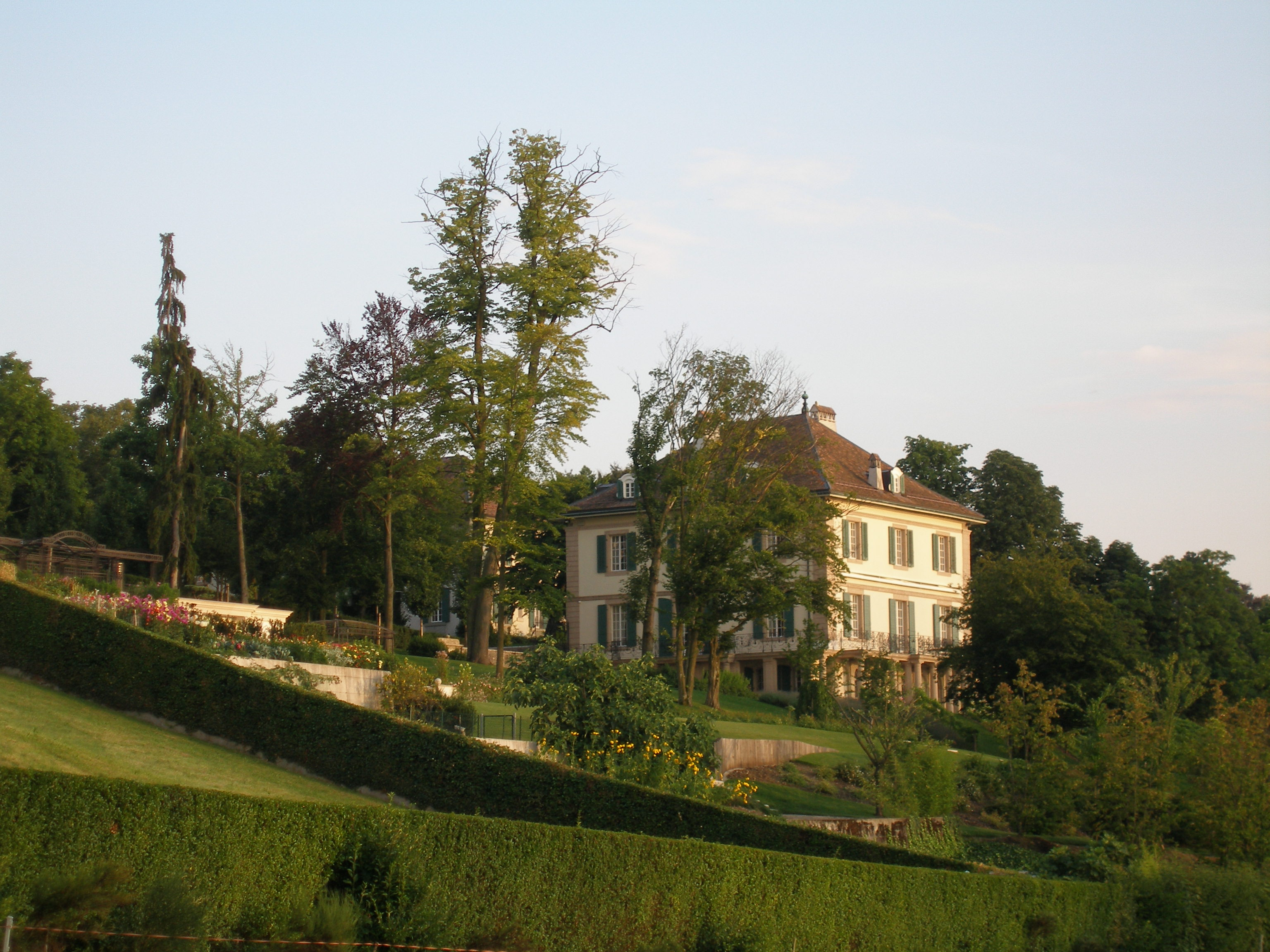
