= Fare Thee Well (poem) =

1816 poem by Lord Byron

"Fare Thee Well" is an 1816 poem by Lord Byron.

The poem was first publicly printed in The Champion in April, 1816 and was also printed in Leigh Hunt's Examiner, April 21, 1816, at the end of an article by L. H. entitled "Distressing Circumstances in High Life." The poem also appeared in The Works of Lord Byron in 1900.

== Background ==
Lord Byron married Annabella Milbanke on 2 January 1815. At the end of that year, their only child was born, a girl later known as Ada Lovelace, the computer programmer. Over the next few months, their marriage crumbled, and in March 1816 they made a legal settlement of separation. That month, Byron composed "Fare Thee Well" and enclosed a note that said, "Dearest Bell – I send you the first verses that ever I attempted to write upon you, and perhaps the last that I may ever write at all."

In April he signed a Deed of Separation and added the following notation:

A year ago, you swore, fond she!
"To love, to honour," and so forth:
Such was the vow you pledged to me,
And here's exactly what 'tis worth.

Byron left England and never saw his wife or daughter again.
