= The Vampyre =

1819 short story by John William Polidori

- Short story by John William Polidori
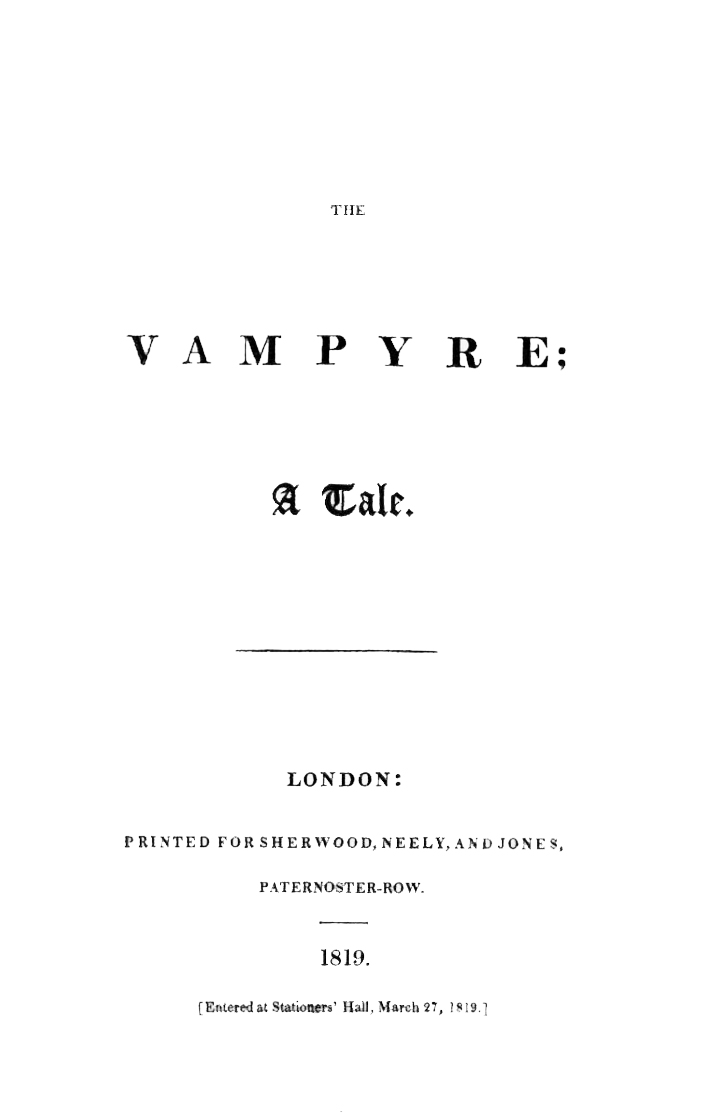
- 1819 title page, Sherwood, Neely, and Jones, London.

Text available at Wikisource
- Country: England
- Language: English
- Genre: Gothic Horror short story

Publication
- Publication type: Magazine
- Publisher: The New Monthly Magazine and Universal Register; London: H. Colburn, 1814–1820. Vol. 1, No. 63.
- Media type: Print (Periodical and Paperback)
- Publication date: 1 April 1819
- Pages: p.195–206

"The Vampyre" is a short work of prose fiction written in 1819 by John William Polidori, taken from the story told by Lord Byron as part of a contest among Polidori, Mary Shelley, Lord Byron, and Percy Shelley. The same contest produced the novel Frankenstein; or, The Modern Prometheus.

"The Vampyre" is often viewed as the progenitor of the romantic vampire genre of fantasy fiction. The work is described by Christopher Frayling as "the first story successfully to fuse the disparate elements of vampirism into a coherent literary genre."

== Characters ==
- Lord Ruthven: a suave British nobleman, the vampire
- Aubrey: a wealthy young gentleman, an orphan
- Ianthe: a beautiful Greek woman Aubrey meets on his journeys with Ruthven
- Aubrey's sister: Becomes engaged to the Earl of Marsden
- Earl of Marsden: Lord Ruthven's disguise when courting Aubrey's sister

== Plot ==
Aubrey meets the mysterious Lord Ruthven at a social event when he comes to London. After briefly getting to know Ruthven, Aubrey agrees to go travelling around Europe with him. Aubrey slowly realizes that Ruthven delights in causing the ruin and degradation of others, and after Ruthven attempts to seduce the daughter of a mutual acquaintance near Rome, Aubrey leaves in disgust. Alone, Aubrey travels to Greece where he falls in love with an innkeeper's daughter, Ianthe. She tells him about the legends of the vampire, which are very popular in the area, and Aubrey recognises that Ruthven fits the physical description.

This romance is short-lived: Ianthe is killed, her throat torn open by an attacker who injures Aubrey and leaves behind an unusual dagger. The whole town believes it to be the work of an evil vampire. Aubrey falls ill, but is found and nursed back to health by Ruthven. Although suspicious of the man, Aubrey feels obliged to Ruthven and rejoins him in his travels. The pair are attacked by bandits on the road and Ruthven is mortally wounded. On his deathbed, Ruthven makes Aubrey swear an oath that he will not speak of Ruthven or his death for a year and a day, and once Aubrey agrees, Lord Ruthven dies laughing. Amongst Ruthven's belongings Aubrey discovers a sheath which matches the dagger found by Ianthe's body.

Aubrey returns to London and is amazed when Ruthven appears shortly thereafter, alive and well. Ruthven reminds Aubrey of his oath and although Aubrey wants to warn others of Ruthven's character he feels unable to break his oath. Helpless to protect his sister from Ruthven, Aubrey has a nervous breakdown. Upon recovering, Aubrey learns that Ruthven has inherited an earldom and is engaged to his sister, and they are due to be married on the day that his oath will end. Unable to delay the wedding, Aubrey has a stroke. That night, his oath expires, and Aubrey relates the entire story before dying. But it is too late: Ruthven has disappeared, leaving his new wife dead and drained of blood.

== Publication ==
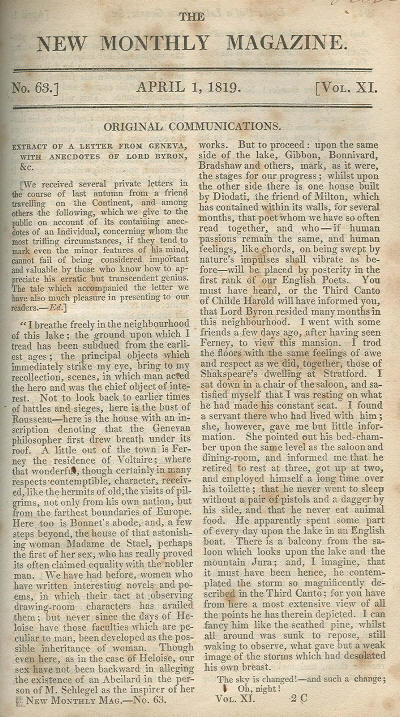
The New Monthly Magazine, 1 April 1819.

"The Vampyre" was first published on 1 April 1819 by Henry Colburn in The New Monthly Magazine with the false attribution "A Tale by Lord Byron". The name of the work's protagonist, "Lord Ruthven", added to this assumption, for that name was originally used in Lady Caroline Lamb's novel Glenarvon (from the same publisher), in which a thinly-disguised Byron figure was named Clarence de Ruthven, Earl of Glenarvon. Despite repeated denials by Byron and Polidori, the authorship often went unclarified. In the following issue, dated May 1, 1819, Polidori wrote a letter to the editor explaining "that though the groundwork is certainly Lord Byron's, its development is mine".

The tale was first published in book form by Sherwood, Neely, and Jones in London, Paternoster Row, in 1819 in octavo as The Vampyre; A Tale in 84 pages. The notation on the cover noted that it was: "Entered at Stationers' Hall, March 27, 1819". Once again, the author was given as Lord Byron on the title page. After Polidori protested, later printings removed Byron's name from the title page but did not replace it with Polidori's.

The story was an immediate popular success, partly because of the Byron attribution and partly because it exploited the gothic horror predilections of the public. Polidori transformed the vampire from a character in folklore into the form that is recognized today—an aristocratic fiend who preys among high society. Due to this influential aspect, Jan Čapek argued that "Ruthven’s excesses in Polidori’s tale reveal the landscape of modern, increasingly capitalistic class society to be laden with anxiety concerning the continuing power of the aristocracy, as though untouched by the social shifts in the wake of the industrial revolution."

The story has its genesis in the summer of 1816, the Year Without a Summer, when Europe and parts of North America underwent a severe climate abnormality. Lord Byron and his young physician John Polidori were staying at the Villa Diodati by Lake Geneva and were visited by Percy Bysshe Shelley, Mary Shelley, and Claire Clairmont. Kept indoors by the "incessant rain" of that "wet, ungenial summer", over three days in June the five turned to telling fantastical tales, and then writing their own. Fueled by ghost stories such as the Fantasmagoriana, William Beckford's Vathek, and quantities of laudanum, Mary Shelley produced what would become Frankenstein, or The Modern Prometheus. Polidori was inspired by a fragmentary story of Byron's, "Fragment of a Novel" (1816), also known as "A Fragment" and "The Burial: A Fragment", and in "two or three idle mornings" produced "The Vampyre". While most scholars pursue Polidori's proximity to Byron as a decisive factor, Jan Čapek warns against a "Byromaniacal" reading of the tale, arguing that "such an infection of the discussion about Polidori with the germ of Byron’s controversial persona is somewhat paradoxical, considering that the resulting debate oscillates somewhere between a sense that Polidori’s conception itself reflects his own sense of the debilitating domination of Byron’s genius and a sense that Polidori attempted to take control in defence against such domination and wrote the tale in an attempt to satirize the effects of Byron’s proximity and to assert his own worth."

== Influence ==
Polidori's work had an immense impact on contemporary sensibilities and ran through numerous editions and translations. Jan Čapek argued that:

"Whether Polidori wrote 'The Vampyre' out of spite toward Byron or not, whether he is guilty of a measure of plagiarism, or whether he even intended to have the story published or not, the tale energizes a series of figurations of the vampire in what is now over two centuries long tradition of vampire prose fiction. No matter the mysterious occasions or the undisclosed motivations or intentions, Polidori’s 'The Vampyre' must be judged by its shaping of vampire fiction, giving it a true start which would capture the Victorian period as much as the vampire panic captured the Enlightened period and as much as it would later capture much of the twentieth century without the interest waning in the early decades of the twenty-first century. [...] John William Polidori unleashes the figure of the vampire, in all its aristocratic and privileged, rhetorically powerful and seductive, sexually potent and corruptive and, in any case, cunning and elusive power."

That influence has extended into the current era as the text is seen as "canonical" and – together with Bram Stoker's Dracula and others – is "often even cited as almost folkloric sources on vampirism". An adaptation appeared in 1820 with Cyprien Bérard's novel Lord Ruthwen ou les Vampires, falsely attributed to Charles Nodier, who himself then wrote his own dramatic version, Le Vampire, a play which had enormous success and sparked a "vampire craze" across Europe. This includes operatic adaptations by Heinrich Marschner (see Der Vampyr) and Peter Josef von Lindpaintner (see Der Vampyr), both published in the same year. Nikolai Gogol, Alexandre Dumas and Aleksey Tolstoy all produced vampire tales, and themes in Polidori's tale would continue to influence Bram Stoker's Dracula and eventually the whole vampire genre. Dumas makes explicit reference to Lord Ruthven in The Count of Monte Cristo, going so far as to state that his character "The Comtesse G..." had been personally acquainted with Lord Ruthven.

In 1819, The Black Vampyre, an American novella by Uriah D'Arcy, was published, taking advantage of The Vampyre's popularity.

== Film adaptation ==
Earlier adaptations of Polidori's story include the 1945 film The Vampire's Ghost starring John Abbott as the Lord Ruthven character "Webb Fallon", with the setting changed from England and Greece to Africa. Also, The Vampyr: A Soap Opera, based on the opera Der Vampyr by Heinrich Marschner and the Polidori story, was filmed and broadcast on BBC 2 on December 2, 1992, with the Lord Ruthven character's name changed to "Ripley", who is frozen in the late eighteenth century but revives in modern times and becomes a successful businessman.

== Theatrical adaptations ==
In England, James Planché's play The Vampire, or The Bride of the Isles was first performed in London in 1820 at the Lyceum Theatre based on Charles Nodier's Le Vampire, which in turn was based on Polidori. Such melodramas were satirised in Ruddigore, by Gilbert and Sullivan (1887), in which a character called Sir Ruthven must abduct a maiden, or he will die.

In 1988, American playwright Tim Kelly created a drawing room adaptation of The Vampyre for the stage, popular among community theatres and high school drama clubs.
