= Fragment of a Novel =

1819 unfinished vampire horror story written by Lord Byron

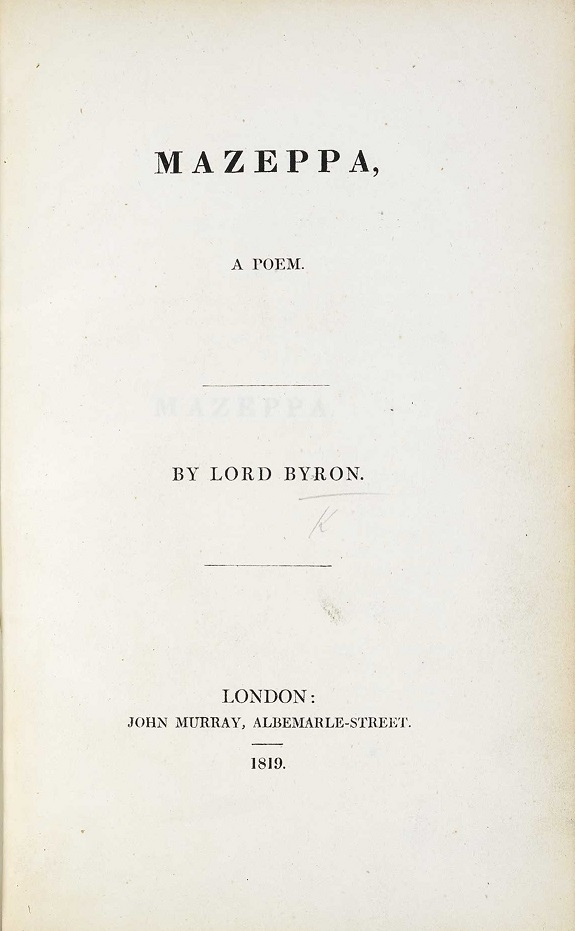
Title page of the first edition of Mazeppa (1819), which contained the first publication of "A Fragment"

"Fragment of Novel" is an unfinished 1819 vampire horror story written by Lord Byron. The story, also known as "A Fragment" and "The Burial: A Fragment", was one of the first in English to feature a vampire theme. The main character was Augustus Darvell. John William Polidori based his novella The Vampyre (1819), originally attributed in print to Lord Byron, on the Byron fragment. The vampire in the Polidori story, Lord Ruthven, was modelled on Byron himself.

The story was the result of the meeting that Byron had in the summer of 1816 with Percy Bysshe Shelley at Villa Diodati in Switzerland where a "ghost writing" contest was proposed. This contest was also what led to the creation of Frankenstein according to Percy Bysshe Shelley's 1818 Preface to the novel. The story is important in the development and evolution of the vampire story in English literature as one of the first to feature the modern vampire as able to function in society in disguise. The short story first appeared under the title "A Fragment" in the 1819 collection Mazeppa: A Poem, published by John Murray in London.

== Plot ==
The story is written in an epistolary form with the narrator recounting the events that had occurred in a letter. The letter is dated 17 June 1816. The narrator embarks on a journey or "Grand Tour" to the East with an older man, Augustus Darvell. During the journey, Darvell becomes physically weaker, "daily more enfeebled". They arrive at a Turkish cemetery between Smyrna and Ephesus near the columns of Diana. Near death, Darvell reaches a pact with the narrator not to reveal his impending death to anyone. A stork appears in the cemetery with a snake in its mouth. After Darvell dies, the narrator is shocked to see that his face turns black and his body rapidly decomposes:

"I was shocked with the sudden certainty which could not be mistaken — his countenance in a few minutes became nearly black. I should have attributed so rapid a change to poison, had I not been aware that he had no opportunity of receiving it unperceived."

Darvell is buried in the Turkish cemetery by the narrator. The narrator's reaction was stoical: "I was tearless." According to John Polidori, Byron intended to have Darvell reappear, alive again, as a vampire, but did not finish the story. Polidori's account of Byron's story in a letter to his publisher in 1819 indicates it "depended for interest upon the circumstances of two friends leaving England, and one dying in Greece, the other finding him alive upon his return, and making love to his sister."

== Major characters ==
- The Narrator, recounts the story in a letter
- Augustus Darvell, a wealthy, experienced man
- Suleiman, a Turkish janizary

== Publication history ==
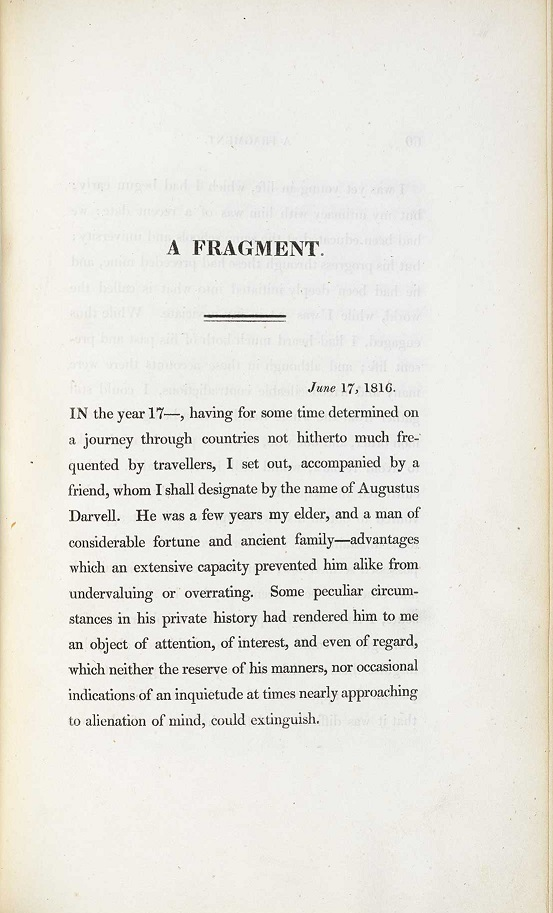
First page of "A Fragment"'s first edition, in the Mazeppa collection (1819)

Byron's unfinished short story, also known as "A Fragment" and "The Burial: A Fragment", was appended to Mazeppa by the publisher John Murray in June 1819 in London without the approval of Byron. On 20 March 1820, Byron wrote to Murray: "I shall not allow you to play the tricks you did last year with the prose you post-scribed to 'Mazeppa,' which I sent to you not to be published, if not in a periodical paper, – and there you tacked it, without a word of explanation, and be damned to you."

== Byron on vampirism ==
Byron wrote about his views on vampires and vampirism in his notes to the 1813 work The Giaour: A Fragment of a Turkish Tale:

The Vampire superstition is still general in the Levant. Honest Tournefort tells a long story about these 'Vroucolachas', as he calls them. The Romaic term is 'Vardoulacha'. I recollect a whole family being terrified by the scream of a child, which they imagined must proceed from such a visitation. The Greeks never mention the word without horror. I find that 'Broucolokas' is an old legitimate Hellenic appellation—the moderns, however, use the word I mention. The stories told in Hungary and Greece of these foul feeders are singular, and some of them most incredibly attested.

A vampire who returns to destroy his family is described in The Giaour, lines 757–768:

But first, on earth as vampire sent,
Thy corse shall from its tomb be rent:
Then ghastly haunt thy native place,
And suck the blood of all thy race;
There from thy daughter, sister, wife,
At midnight drain the stream of life;
Yet loathe the banquet which perforce
Must feed thy livid living corse:
Thy victims ere they yet expire
Shall know the demon for their sire,
As cursing thee, thou cursing them,
Thy flowers are withered on the stem.

In a 27 April 1819 letter, however, Byron disclaimed any interest in vampires: "I have besides a personal dislike to 'Vampires,' and the little acquaintance I have with them would by no means induce me to reveal their secrets."

Byron would be regarded as the originator or origin for the modern conception of the vampire in literature as a prominent member of society.

== Ghost story contest ==
The vampire fragment was a product of the ghost story contest that occurred in Geneva on 17 June 1816, when Byron stayed at the Villa Diodati with author and physician John William Polidori. Their guests were Percy Bysshe Shelley, Mary Godwin, Shelley's girlfriend at that time, and Claire Clairmont. Mary recalled the contest and Byron's contribution in the 1831 introduction to Frankenstein:

'We will each write a ghost story,' said Lord Byron; and his proposition was acceded to. There were four of us. The noble author began a tale, a fragment of which he printed at the end of his poem of Mazeppa.

In the 1818 preface to Frankenstein, Percy Bysshe Shelley described the contest with Lord Byron and John Polidori:

Two other friends (a tale from the pen of one of whom would be far more acceptable to the public than anything I can ever hope to produce) and myself agreed to write each a story, founded on some supernatural occurrence.

Byron began writing the fragment in an old account book of Lady Byron's, which he had kept as it contained the only sample he had of her writing other than their deed of separation.

== Sources ==
- Abbott, John. The Study of Vamprirism in Byron's Oriental Tales. Diss. 1985. uhcl-ir.tdl.org
- Bainbridge, S. "Lord Ruthven's Power: Polidori's 'The Vampyre', Doubles and the Byronic Imagination." The Byron Journal, 2006
- Barber, Paul. Vampires, Burial, and Death: Folklore and Reality. Yale University Press, 1988.
- Carrère, Emmanuel. Gothic Romance (Original French title: Bravoure). (1984). English version published by Scribner, 1990. ISBN 0-684-19199-7
- Clute, John and John Grant, editors. The Encyclopedia of Fantasy. Orbit, 1997, p. 154.
- Davis, G. "Bloodsucking Byron." Essays in Romanticism 12.1 (2004): 7-38.
- Frayling, Christopher, editor, with introduction. Vampyres: Lord Byron to Count Dracula. Faber and Faber, 1992. ISBN 0-571-16792-6
- Gelder, Ken. Reading the Vampire. NY: Routledge, 1994.
- The Byronic Vampyre.
- A vampiric extract from The Giaour: A Fragment of a Turkish Tale (1813).
- Lovecraft, H. P. "Supernatural Horror in Literature." The Recluse, No. 1 (1927), pp. 23–59.
- McGinley, Kathryn. "Development of the Byronic Vampire: Byron, Stoker, Rice." The Gothic World of Anne Rice, edited by Ray Broadus Browne and Gary Hoppenstand. Bowling Green State University Popular Press, 1996.
- Pop Zarieva, Natalija. "The Endurance of the Gothic: The Romantics’ Contribution to the Vampire Myth." International Journal Knowledge 28.7 (2018): 2339-2343.
- Seed, David. '"The Platitude of Prose": Byron's Vampire Fragment in the Context of his Verse Narratives', in Bernard Beatty and Vincent Newey, eds., Byron and the Limits of Fiction, Liverpool: Liverpool U.P., 1988, pp. 126–147.
- Sims, Michael, ed. Dracula's Guest: A Connoisseur's Collection of Victorian Vampire Stories. New York: Walker and Company, 2010. Contains "Fragment of a Novel" by Lord Byron under the title "The End of My Journey", pp. 36-44.
- Skarda, Patricia. "Vampirism and Plagiarism: Byron’s Influence and Polidori’s Practice." Studies in Romanticism, 28 (Summer 1989): 249–69.
- Stott, Andrew McConnell. The Poet and the Vampyre: The Curse of Byron and the Birth of Literature’s Greatest Monsters. New York: Canongate/Pegasus, 2014
- Stott, Andrew McConnell. "The Poet, the Physician and the Birth of the Modern Vampire", The Public Domain Review. Retrieved 7 August 2017..
- Tournefort, Joseph Pitton de. A Voyage Into the Levant, 1718. English edition, London: printed for D. Midwinter. Volume I, 1741.
- Whitton, Charlotte. "Lord Byron on Vampires." Queen's Quarterly 57 (1950): 474.
