= John Hoyland (writer) =

British writer (1750–1831)

- Born: 1750
- Died: 30 August 1831 (aged 81); Northampton, England
- Occupation: Author
- Writing career
- Genres: Non-fiction, Religious
- Notable works: A Historical Survey of the Customs, Habits, and Present State of the Gypsies (1816)
- Movement: Quakerism

John Hoyland (1750–1831) was an English Quaker author. Known as a writer on the Romani people, he also published a religious work.

== Life ==
Hoyland has been described as "of Sheffield, Yorkshire", and as "formerly of York". In the summer of 1814 he began to study the Romani of the East Midland counties Northamptonshire, Bedfordshire, and Hertfordshire, and their poor economic state. He is reported to have fallen in love with a "black-eyed gipsy girl"; but Walter Simson's assertion that he married one is considered unfounded. He carried out extensive survey work, and sought to draw attention to his perception that the Romani needed religious conversion, as well as a better standard of living. A sympathetic observer, Hoyland also supported forced education of the Romani.

Hoyland died at Northampton on 30 August 1831.

== Works ==
Hoyland's Epitome of the History of the World from the Creation to the Advent of the Messiah, first published anonymously (London, 1812), reached a third edition under the title The Fulfilment of Scripture Prophecy (1823). It is a euhemeristic work, in which Elijah is the prototype of Phaeton, as Jephtha's daughter is of Iphigenia. A Historical Survey of the Customs, Habits, and Present State of the Gypsies (York, 1816) is mainly based on Matthew Raper's translation of Heinrich Moritz Gottlieb Grellmann's Zigeuner.

== Notes ==
Attribution

This article incorporates text from a publication now in the public domain: Lee, Sidney, ed. (1891). "Hoyland, John (1750-1831)". Dictionary of National Biography. Vol. 28. London: Smith, Elder & Co.
