= Lady Caroline Lamb =

English novelist and aristocrat (1785–1828)

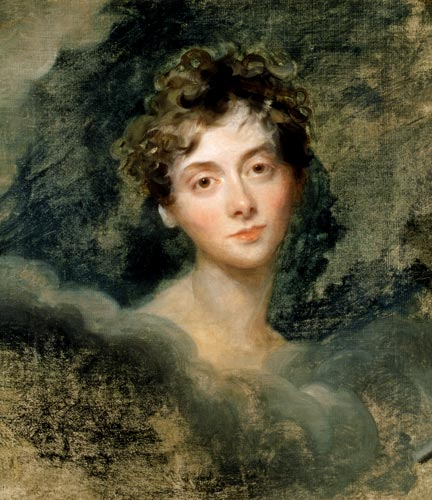
- Portrait of Lady Caroline Lamb by Thomas Lawrence, c. 1805
- Born: 13 November 1785
- Died: 25 January 1828 (aged 42)
- Spouse: William Lamb (m. 1805)
- Parents: The 3rd Earl of Bessborough; Lady Henrietta Spencer
- Relatives: Frederick Ponsonby (brother)

Lady Caroline Lamb (née Ponsonby; 13 November 1785 – 25 January 1828) was an Anglo-Irish aristocrat and novelist, best known for Glenarvon, a Gothic novel. In 1812, she had an affair with Lord Byron, whom she described as "mad, bad, and dangerous to know". Her husband was the Honourable William Lamb, who after her death became 2nd Viscount Melbourne and British prime minister.

== Family background ==
Lamb was the only daughter of Frederick Ponsonby, 3rd Earl of Bessborough, an Anglo-Irish peer, and Henrietta, Countess of Bessborough. She was known as the Honourable Caroline Ponsonby until her father succeeded to the earldom in 1793. While her brother, Frederick Ponsonby, was severely injured in the Battle of Waterloo, in the days after the battle, she had an affair with the Duke of Wellington.

She was related to other leading society ladies and was the niece of Georgiana Cavendish, Duchess of Devonshire, and cousin by marriage of Annabella, Lady Byron. She was related to Sarah Ponsonby, one half of the Ladies of Llangollen, and Diana, Princess of Wales.

She was never Viscountess Melbourne because she died before Melbourne succeeded to the peerage.

== Youth and education ==
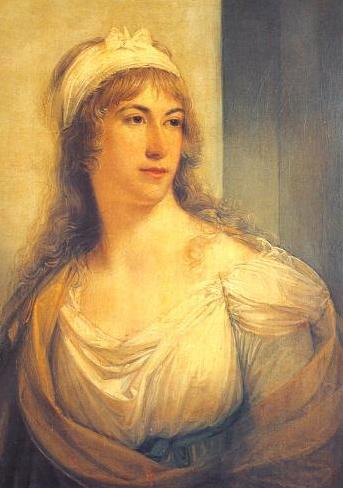
Lady Caroline's mother, Henrietta, Countess of Bessborough, by Angelica Kauffman in 1793

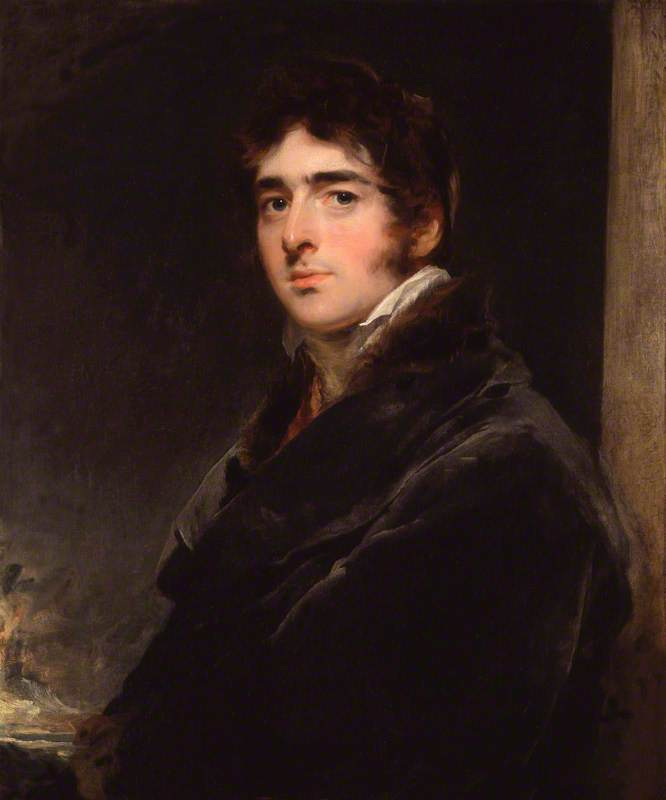
Portrait of Lord Melbourne by Thomas Lawrence, 1805.

As a small child, Lady Caroline was considered delicate and for the sake of her health spent much of her time in the country. She travelled with her mother and family to Italy, where she recovered from an illness caused by worms that nearly proved fatal. After returning with her mother to England, she rejoined a lively group of children who lived at Devonshire House and Roehampton. These were her cousins, the children of William Cavendish, 5th Duke of Devonshire by his first marriage, to Lady Georgiana Spencer. There were three children, Lady Georgiana ("Little G"), Lady Harriet Cavendish ("Hary-o"), and Lord Hartington ("Hart", later the 6th Duke of Devonshire). There were also two children by his mistress and second wife, Lady Elizabeth Foster: these were Augustus Clifford and Caroline St Jules, later wife of George Lamb.

During childhood, Lady Caroline became particularly close to Lady Harriet, who was three months older. Her behaviour reportedly grew increasingly troublesome to her family; she experimented with sedatives like laudanum and had a special governess to control her.

Lady Morgan reported in her memoirs that Lady Caroline told her that she had grown up as a tomboy and was unable to read or write until adolescence. She claimed that as a child, Lady Caroline considered being able to wash a dog one of her most satisfying accomplishments. While many scholars have accepted this (and other claims made by Lady Morgan), published works of correspondence about her family members make it extremely unlikely.

Her grandmother, the Dowager Lady Spencer, was dedicated to promoting education and later employed the children's governess as her own companion. This was Miss Selina Trimmer, daughter of Mrs Sarah Trimmer, an author of moral tales for children. She taught them an extensive curriculum. A published letter that Lady Caroline wrote on 31 October 1796, just before her eleventh birthday, demonstrates her literacy and shows her wit and talent for mimicry.

Lady Caroline was educated at home. She also attended a school in Hans Place, Knightsbridge, London, the successor to Reading Abbey Girls' School, where she was taught by Frances Arabella Rowden. Rowden was a published poet, and according to another pupil, Mary Russell Mitford, "she had a knack of making poetesses of her pupils".

In her early adult years, Lady Caroline wrote prose and poetry, and took to sketching and portraiture. She spoke French and Italian fluently, was skilled at Greek and Latin and enjoyed music and drama.

== Marriage and family ==
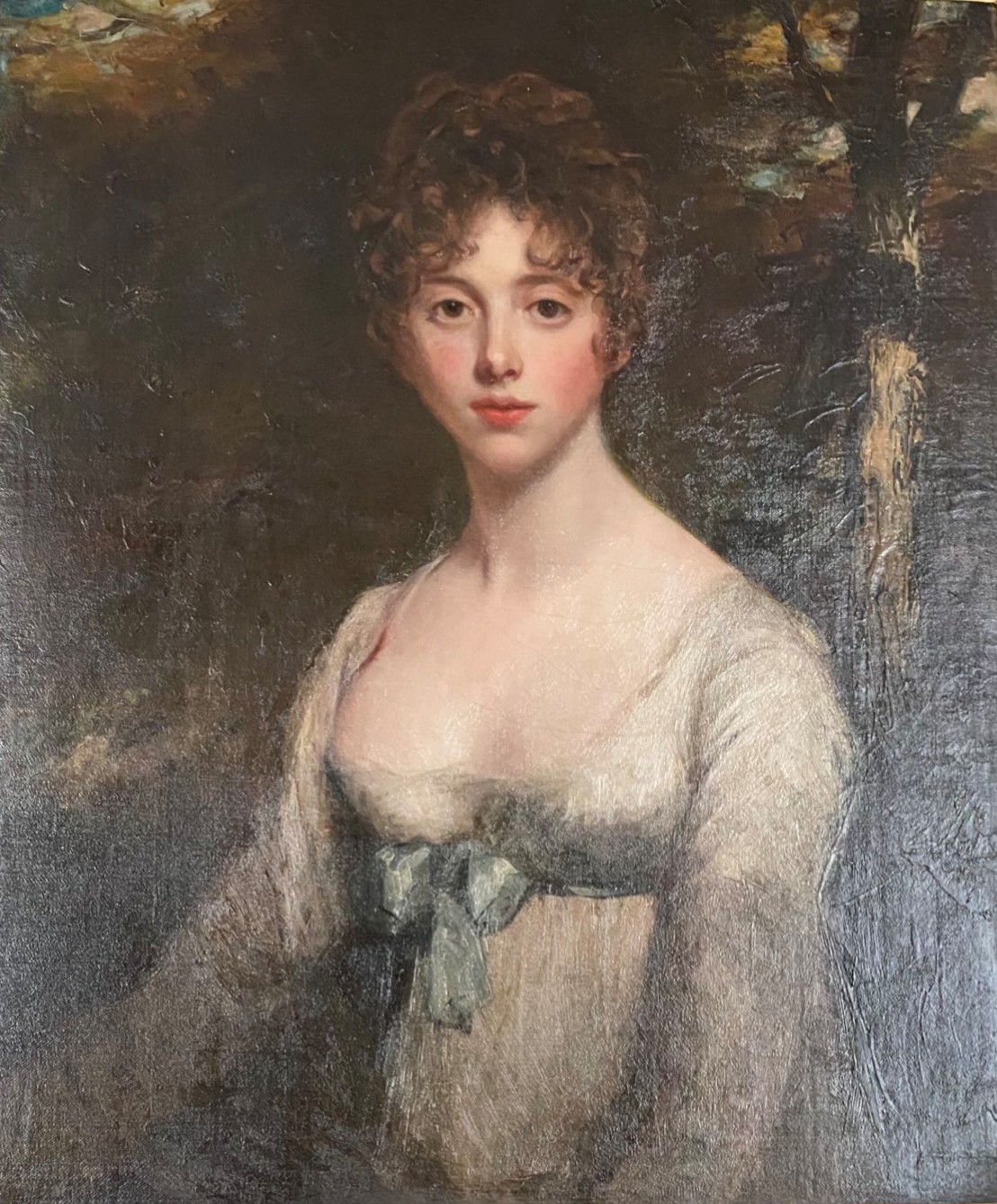
Lady Caroline Lamb, née Ponsonby by John Hoppner

In June 1805, at the age of nineteen, Lady Caroline Ponsonby married William Lamb, a rising politician and heir to the 1st Viscount Melbourne. Although their meeting had been shrewdly orchestrated by William Lamb's mother, theirs was a love match. The couple became "mutually captivated" during a visit to Brocket Hall in 1802 and for many years the pair enjoyed a happy marriage. In 1809, his brother George married her namesake cousin Caroline St Jules.

Caroline gave birth to a stillborn child in January 1806. She and William later had a son, George Augustus Frederick, born on 11 August 1807, and a premature daughter, born in 1809, who died within 24 hours. Lady Caroline suffered long recovery periods after each birth.

Her son was born with severe learning disabilities. Although most aristocratic families typically sent such relatives to institutions, the Lambs cared for their son at home until his eventual death in 1836, eight years after Lady Caroline's death. The stress of their son's ill health, combined with William Lamb's consuming career ambitions, drove a wedge between the couple. A further difficulty was that William's siblings all detested Caroline, whom they called "the little beast", and she and her mother-in-law had hated each other from the start. Their lifelong enmity was reportedly a great cause of unhappiness to Caroline.

== Relationship with Lord Byron ==
From March to August 1812, Lady Caroline embarked on a well-publicised affair with Lord Byron. He was 24, and she was 26. She spurned his attention on their first meeting, which was at a society event at Holland House. According to the memoirs of her friend Sydney, Lady Morgan, Lady Caroline claimed she coined the phrase "mad, bad, and dangerous to know" soon after she had met the poet. It became his lasting epitaph, but there is no contemporary evidence to prove that she coined the famous phrase at the time. She wrote him a fan letter. His response was to visit her because of her high social status and then to pursue her passionately.

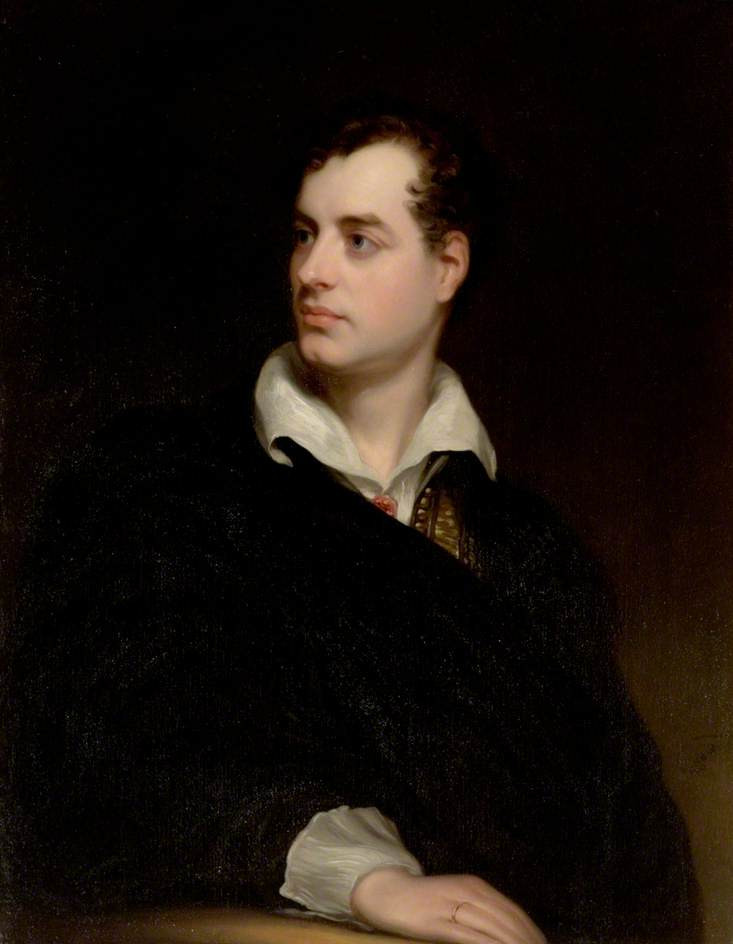
Portrait of Lord Byron in 1814, by Thomas Phillips

Lady Caroline and Lord Byron publicly decried each other as they privately pledged their love over the following months. Byron referred to Lamb as "Caro", which she adopted as her public nickname. After Byron ended the affair, her husband took Lady Caroline to Ireland. The distance did not cool Lady Caroline's interest in the poet, and she and Byron corresponded constantly during her exile. When Lady Caroline returned to London in 1813, however, Byron made it clear that he had no intention of restarting their relationship. That spurred increasingly-public attempts to reunite with her former lover.

Matters came to a head at a ball in honour of the Duke of Wellington when Byron publicly insulted Lady Caroline, who responded by breaking a wine glass and trying to slash her wrists. She did not seriously injure herself, and it is most unlikely that she had any suicidal intentions, but her reputation was damaged and her mental stability was questioned. Byron himself referred to it as a theatrical performance: "Lady Caroline performed the dagger scene" (a reference to Macbeth).

Lady Caroline's obsession with Byron would define much of her later life, as well as influencing both her and Byron's works. They would write poems in the style of each other about each other and even embed overt messages to one another in their verse. After a thwarted visit to Byron's home, Lady Caroline wrote "Remember Me!" into the flyleaf of one of Byron's books. He responded with the hate poem: "Remember thee! Remember thee!; Till Lethe quench life's burning stream; Remorse and shame shall cling to thee, And haunt thee like a feverish dream! Remember thee! Ay, doubt it not. Thy husband too shall think of thee! By neither shalt thou be forgot, Thou false to him, thou fiend to me!"

Her cousin Harriet, now Lady Granville, with whom Lady Caroline's relationship had deteriorated after childhood, visited her in December 1816 and was so incredulous at her unrepentant behaviour that she ended her description of the visit in a letter to her sister, "I mean my visits to be annual".

== Literary career ==
Lady Caroline Lamb was noted to have been involved in a few different literary circles that met in the Holland House, Lady Charleville's, Lord Ward's, Lord Lansdowne's and others of similar repute.

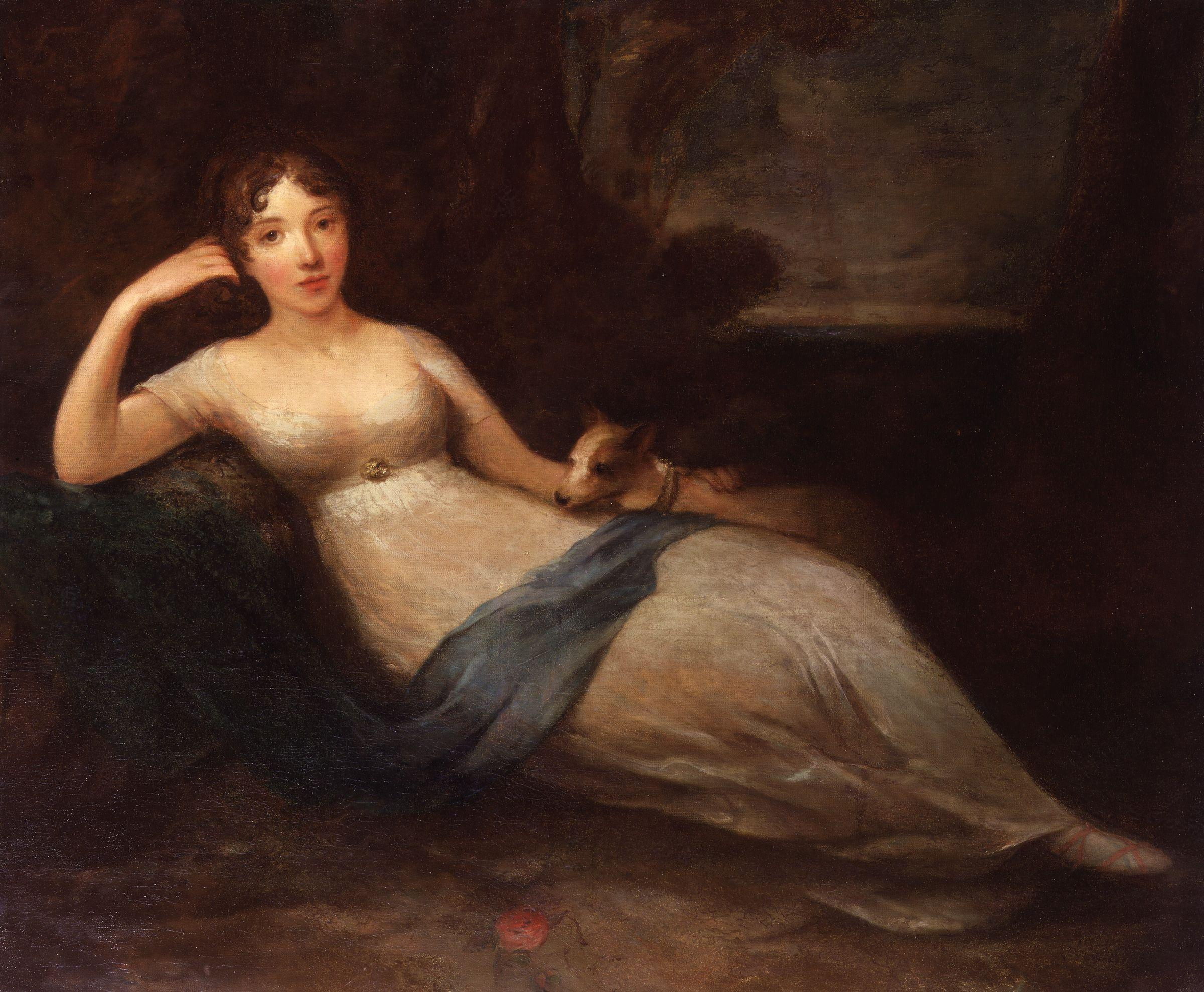
Lady Caroline Lamb by Eliza H. Trotter, 1810s

Lady Caroline's most famous work is Glenarvon, a Gothic novel that was released in 1816 just weeks after Byron's departure from England. Although published anonymously, Lady Caroline's authorship was an open secret. It featured a thinly disguised pen-picture of herself and her former lover, who was painted as a war hero who turns traitor against Irish nationalism. The book was notable for featuring the first version of the Byronic hero outside of Byron's own work as well as a detailed scrutiny of the Romantic period and, more specifically, the Ton. Lady Caroline included scathing caricatures of several of those prominent society members. One of them, the Countess of Jersey, cancelled Lady Caroline's vouchers to Almack's in retribution for her characterisations. This was the opening salvo in a backlash that found Lady Caroline outcast from fashionable society: although her sister-in-law, Emily Lamb, Countess Cowper, got Lady Caroline readmitted to Almack's in 1819, her reputation never fully recovered.

Byron responded to the novel; "I read Glenarvon too by Caro Lamb….God damn!" The book was a financial success that sold out several editions but was dismissed by critics as pulp fiction. However, Goethe deemed it worthy of serious literary consideration.

In 1819, Lady Caroline mimicked Byron's style in the narrative poem "A New Canto". Years before, Lady Caroline had impersonated Byron in a letter to his publishers to have them send her a portrait of Byron. It worked, and the tone and substance of her request fooled them into sending the painting. She used that skill to respond to Byron's "Don Juan I and II". Lady Caroline was most concerned with the allusions Byron had made about her; for example, the line "Some play the devil—and then write a novel" from "Don Juan II".

In "A New Canto", Lady Caroline wrote—as Byron—"I'm sick of fame; I'm gorged with it; so full I almost could regret the happier hour; When northern oracles proclaimed me dull." Byron never publicly responded to the poem. A reviewer of the time opined, in part; "The writer of this lively nonsense has evidently intended it as an imitation of Lord Byron. It is a rhapsody from beginning to end."

Lady Caroline published three additional novels during her lifetime: Graham Hamilton (1822), Ada Reis (1823), and Penruddock (1823).

== Later life and death ==
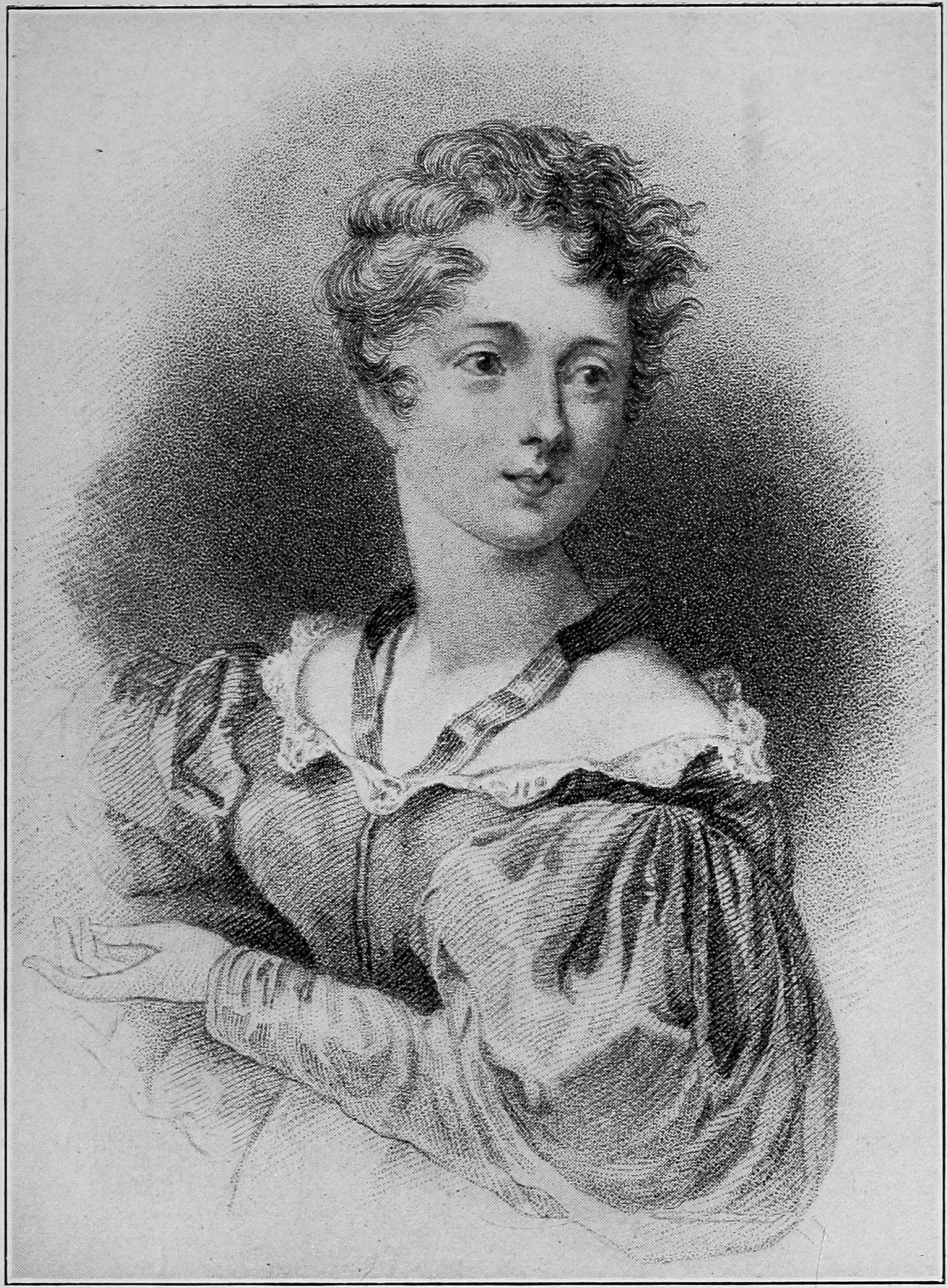
An illustration of Lady Caroline from In Spite of Epilepsy (1910) by Matthew Woods

Byron's confidante and close friend was his wife's maternal aunt, William Lamb's own mother, the colourful Elizabeth Lamb, Viscountess Melbourne. Lady Melbourne had been instrumental in bringing about the politically advantageous marriage of her son to Lady Caroline, despite disliking both her and her mother.

Once Lady Caroline began her affair with Byron, her mother-in-law began a long and blatant campaign to rid her son of his wife. As Lord David Cecil remarks, she had long since concluded that Caroline deserved all her misfortunes. William Lamb refused to submit and regretted that his mother had conspired against his wife with Byron. Calling Byron treacherous, William Lamb was supportive of his wife to her death.

Ultimately, it was Lady Caroline who prevailed on her husband to agree to a formal separation in 1825. Both parties had had numerous extramarital affairs by then, and Lamb had long been known to eschew duplicity. She took up permanent residence at Brocket Hall. Her struggle with mental illness became more pronounced in her last years and was complicated by her abuse of alcohol and laudanum. By 1827, she was under the care of a full-time physician as her body, which had always been frail, began to shut down and she retained fluids, a condition then known as dropsy, and now known as oedema. William Lamb was now Chief Secretary for Ireland and made a perilous crossing to be by her side when Lady Caroline died on 25 January 1828.

Lady Caroline was buried in the graveyard of St Etheldreda's Church in Hatfield. Her husband was later buried within the church.

== In popular culture ==
Portrait of Lady Caroline Lamb by Thomas Phillips, 1813

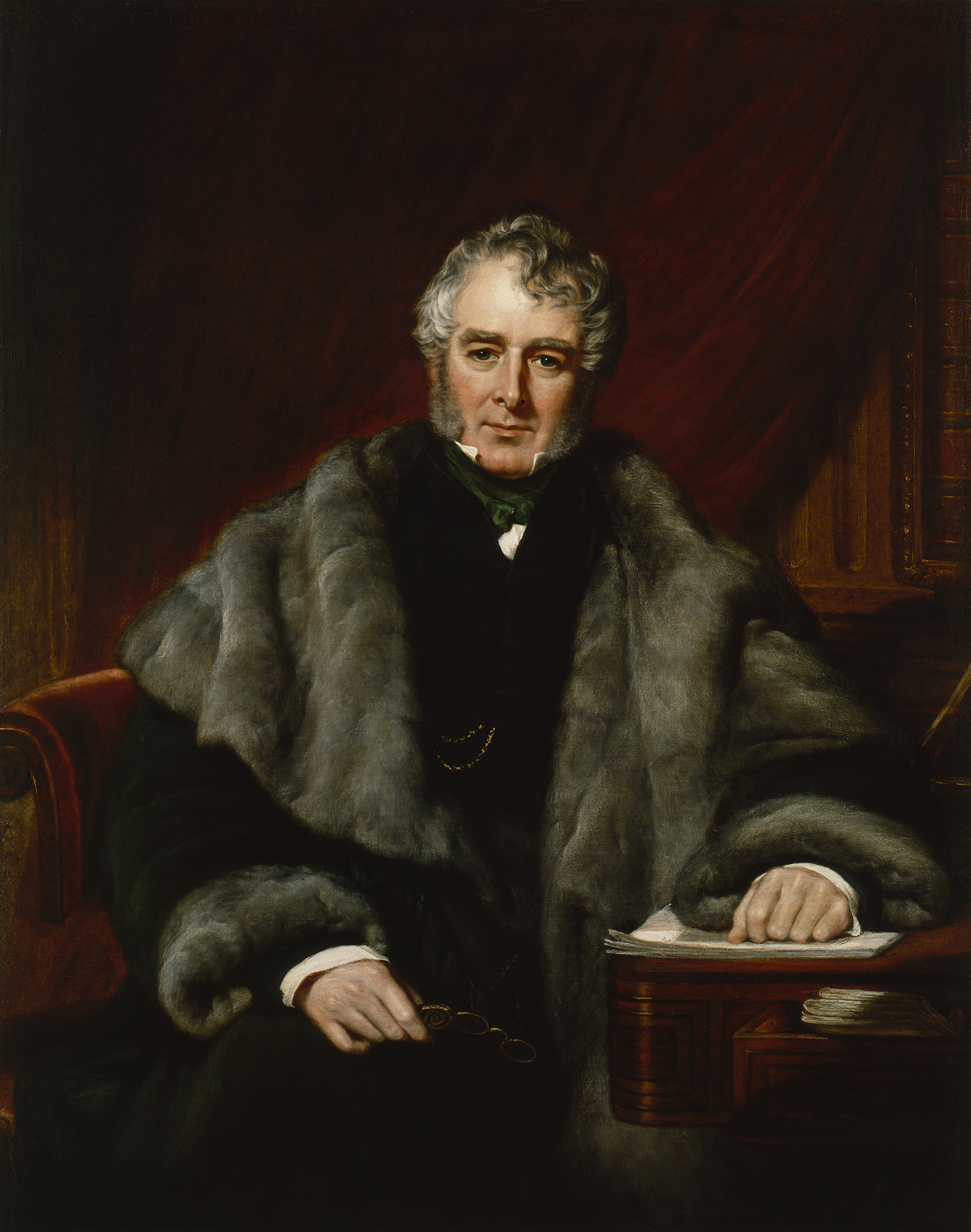
Portrait of Lord Melbourne by John Partridge. After her death her husband served twice as Prime Minister.

The 1905 novel The Marriage of William Ashe by Mary Augusta Ward was based on Lady Caroline and her husband.

The 1964 historical novel This for Caroline by Doris Leslie is based on her life.

In 1972, the film Lady Caroline Lamb was released with Sarah Miles in the lead role and Richard Chamberlain as Byron.

In 2003, the BBC broadcast Byron with Jonny Lee Miller in the title role and Camilla Power as Lady Caroline Lamb.

In 2026, the Dutch author Arthur Japin, published his novel 'Lord M.', which tells about the relationship between Lord Melbourne and the young Queen Victoria. The love for and relationship with Lady Caroline play a big part in the story.
