= Glenarvon =

1816 novel by Lady Caroline Lamb

Glenarvon was Lady Caroline Lamb's first novel. It created a sensation when published on 9 May 1816. Set in the Irish Rebellion of 1798, the book satirized the Whig Holland House circle, while casting a sceptical eye on left-wing politics. Its rakish title character, Lord Glenarvon, is an unflattering depiction of her ex-lover, Lord Byron. In 1866, it was reprinted under the title, The Fatal Passion.

== Theme ==
Glenarvon corrupts the innocent young bride Calantha (Caroline herself), leading to their mutual ruin and death. The picture of her husband, William Lamb (the 2nd Viscount Melbourne from 1828), called Lord Avondale in the book, is more favourable, although he too is held to be partly responsible for Calantha's misfortunes: his biographer remarks that the book's message is that Caroline's troubles are everybody else's fault. The book is full of wildly improbable melodramatic scenes: Calantha's infant brother, the heir to a dukedom, is apparently murdered on the orders of their aunt Lady Margaret, to ensure that her son will inherit the estates; yet later we are told that the child is still alive.

Lady Caroline was unprepared for the negative reaction to Glenarvon. The day after it was published, messages of outrage began to arrive. A second edition softened somewhat the book's sensationalism.

== Impact ==
The book was an enormous success with the reading public, but ruined Lamb's already questionable reputation. Society's leaders did not greatly mind reading about her love affairs, but they deeply resented the vicious and easily recognisable portraits of themselves in the book, which were its chief selling point. One of those thus satirised, Lady Jersey, took her revenge by barring Lamb from Almack's, the centre of fashionable life, a sign that she was socially an outcast. A Melbourne biographer remarked that Lamb never found her way back into society again.

Queen Victoria acquired a copy in September 1841, the day after her last official dispatch from former Prime Minister and close friend Lord Melbourne, who was alluded to in the form of the character Lord Avondale.

== Literary echoes ==
- The title character's full name is Clarence de Ruthven. John Polidori used a vampire named Lord Ruthven as a characterization of Lord Byron in his short story "The Vampyre" published in 1819.
- In the Regency novel Bath Tangle, by Georgette Heyer, the heroine is sent a copy of Glenarvon, which she pronounces both "the most diverting book that ever was written" and "the most absurd farrago of nonsense". After some banter about whether she is herself an innocent Calantha, a partial key to the book is offered, with Lady Morganet taken as a mix of Caroline's mother and her aunt, Lady Bessborough and the Duchess of Devonshire.

== Popular culture ==
The New York City band Glenarvon took their name from the novel.

== See also ==
- Argenis
- Mary Wollstonecraft
- The New Atalantis
