= Early life of Lord Byron =

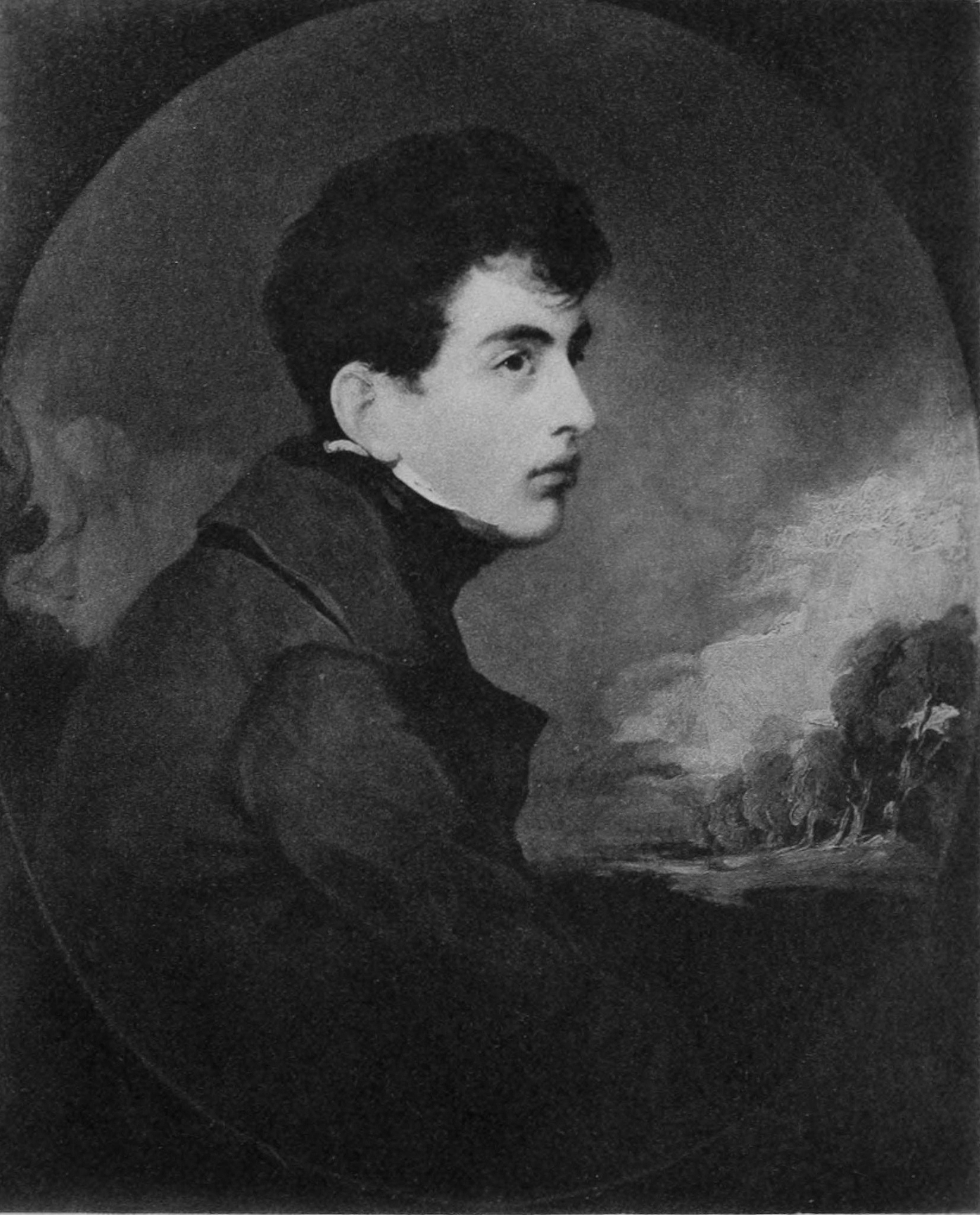
Byron in his late teens. 1804–1806

George Noel Gordon Byron, 6th Baron Byron of Rochdale, better known as Lord Byron, was a British poet. Born 22 January 1788 in Holles Street, London, England, and from two years old raised by his mother in Aberdeen, Scotland he moved back to England at age ten. His life was complicated by his father, who died deep in debt when he was a child. He was able to work his way through school, and his life advanced after he inherited both his great-uncle's title in 1798 and the Newstead Abbey estate.

== Parents ==
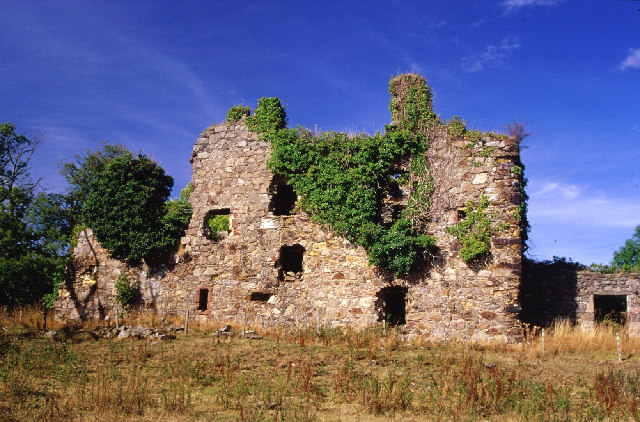
Gight Castle, Aberdeenshire, home of Byron's Gordon ancestors

Lord Byron's family in the English Midlands can be traced back without interruption to Ralph de Buran who arrived in England with William the Conqueror in the 11th century. His land holdings are listed in the Domesday Book.

Byron was the only child of Captain John Byron (known as 'Jack') and his second wife Catherine Gordon, heiress of the Gight estate in Aberdeenshire, Scotland.

Byron's paternal grandparents were Vice-Admiral John Byron and Sophia Trevanion. Having survived a shipwreck as a teenage midshipman, set a new speed record for circumnavigating the globe and become embroiled in a tempestuous voyage during the American Revolutionary War, John had been nicknamed 'Foul-Weather Jack' Byron by the press. The rest of the Byron family seemed to have a knack for scandal, and a history of infidelity and debt. The poet's great-uncle, William, 5th Baron Byron had virtually ruined their ancestral estate at Newstead Abbey thanks to his constant spending, and had been tried for murder after a violent encounter in a London tavern.

Byron's own father Jack was the sixth child and eldest boy of nine. Having attended school, and a military academy, he enlisted into the army. Even before he turned 21 he had developed a habit for spending, and constantly wheedled money out of his parents. While in his early twenties Byron's father Jack had previously been somewhat scandalously married to Amelia, Marchioness of Carmarthen, with whom he had been having an affair – the wedding took place just weeks after her divorce from her husband, and she was around eight months pregnant. The marriage was not a happy one, and their first two children – Sophia Georgina, and an unnamed boy – died in infancy. Amelia herself died in 1784 almost exactly a year after the birth of their third child, the poet's half-sister Augusta Mary. Though she succumbed to a wasting illness, probably tuberculosis, the press reported that her heart had been broken out of remorse for leaving her husband. Much later, 19th-century sources blamed Jack's own "brutal and vicious" treatment of her.

John Byron, in debt and deprived of his wife's £4000 a year income, went to Bath in search of another rich wife. Here he met Catherine Gordon, who was called his "Golden Dolly" for her fortune of £23,000; she was a direct descendant of James I of Scotland.

The Gordon family, like the Byron family, had a history of turmoil and death; her grandfather drowned in 1760, her sister Abercromby died in 1777, her father drowned in Bath Canal in 1779, her other sister Margaret died in 1780, and her mother died in 1782. Her parents, to preserve the family name, had introduced a clause in their will that required the husband of their daughter to take the Gordon name as his own, which John Byron was eager to do. The two married in Bath, 13 May 1785. By July the newly-weds had settled at Gight where John Byron ran through most of the £23,000 Catherine had brought to their marriage. Soon after, he sold her property, the Castle of Gight, for £18,690 to pay off his debts. In March 1786 they went through a second marriage ceremony and John Byron became John Byron Gordon to fulfil the need to sell the estate in Gight. By the end of 1786, Catherine had lost her fortune and her land to John Byron's creditors but she never blamed him for her loss. In July 1787 John fled from the Isle of Wight, where the couple had been living to avoid creditors, to Paris. He was joined there the following September by Mrs Byron who was pregnant. In December she returned to London whilst Byron's father remained on the move to avoid creditors.

== Childhood ==
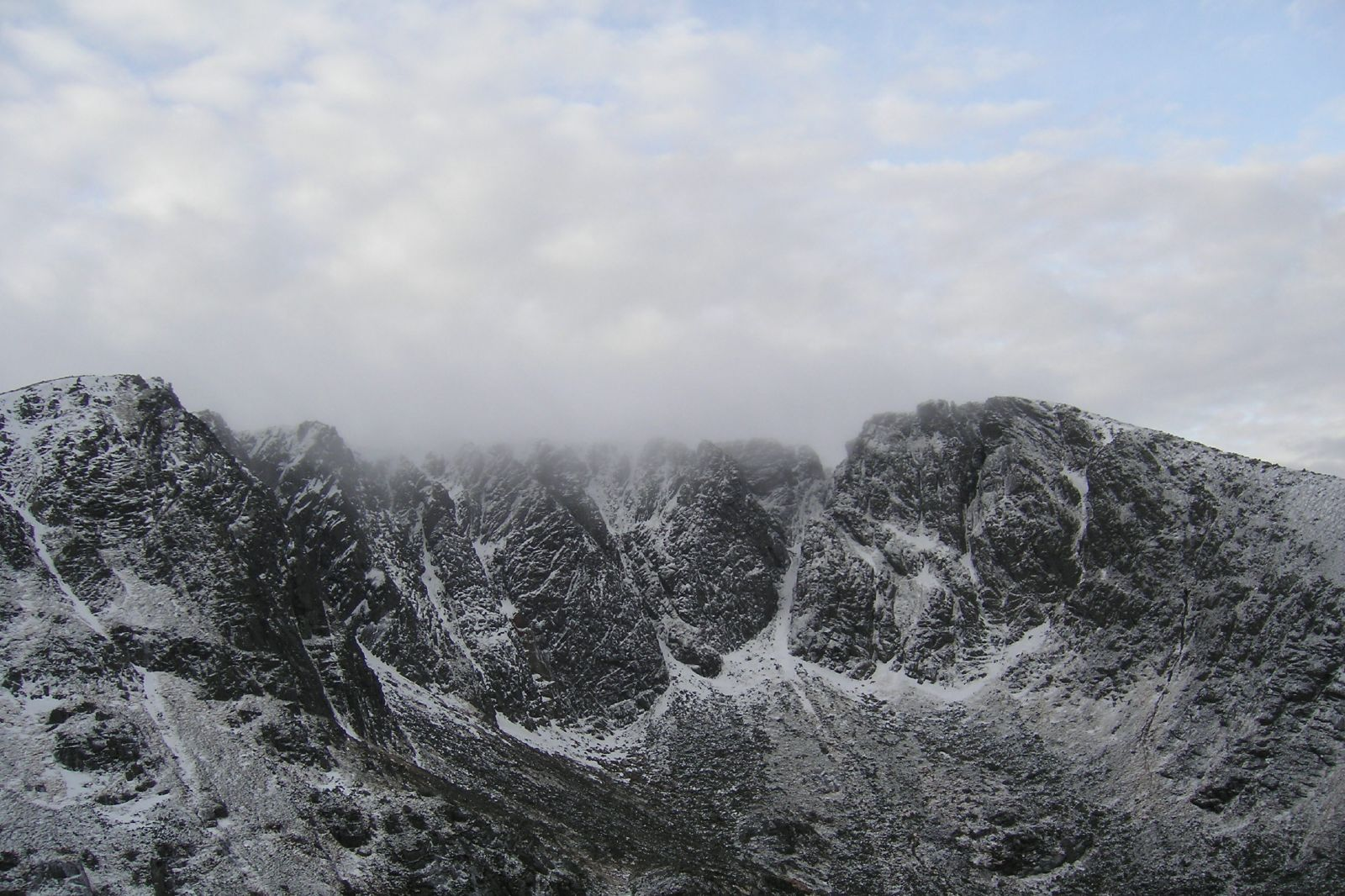
Lochnagar corrie in winter. The area provided Byron with his inspiration for his 1807 poem, Lachin y Gair.

George Gordon Byron was born 22 January 1788 in a house on Holles Street in London. In 1790, Jack and Catherine moved to Aberdeen. His parents' residency in Scotland was not to last, as John wrote to his sister, "She is very amiable at a distance; but I defy you and all the Apostles to live with her two months, for if anybody could live with her, it was me". Byron's parents then decided to live in separate houses upon the same street to see if the distance would allow them to bear each other. This left Byron to be raised by his mother and a nursemaid, Agnes Gray. His parents would meet regularly until they realised that their separation did not solve their problems; John Byron would come to talk to his son, but after being allowed to take Byron to his house to spend one night, he realised that he could not tolerate either Byron or his mother any longer. Shortly thereafter, John left Scotland to live with his sister Fanny (Frances) Leigh at Valenciennes, France, where he died in 1791 of a 'long & suffering' consumptive illness, probably tuberculosis. After John Byron's death, Gordon claimed that she "ever sincerely loved" Byron, and she despaired at her loss.

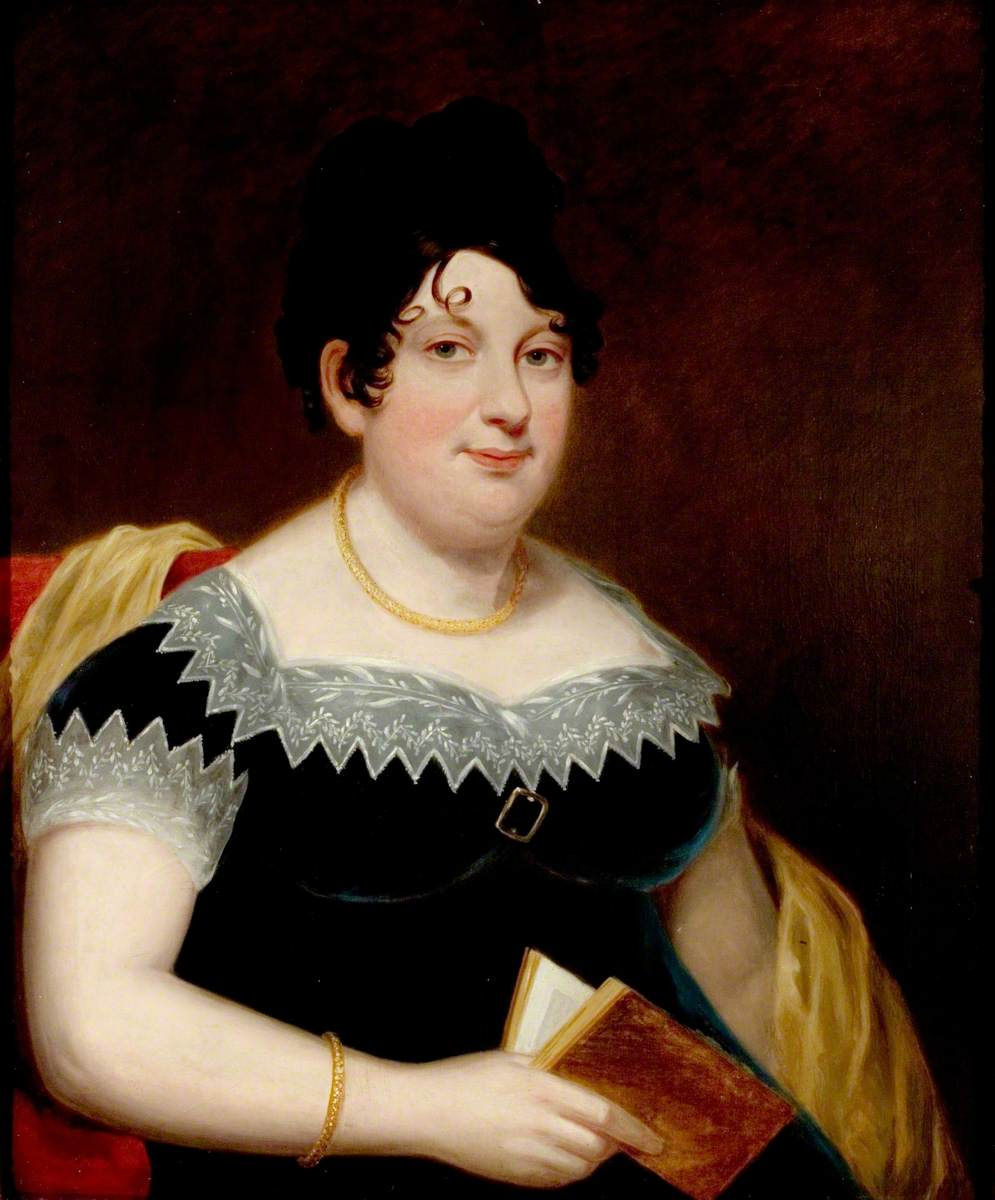
Catherine Gordon

Catherine Gordon was taught to read at a young age and had a passion for literature, a passion she shared with her son. Byron would read through the Bible, focusing predominantly on the Old Testament, and he would also read works dealing with history or narrative tales like the Arabian Nights. However this passion for reading was not the only passion mother and child shared; Catherine was also known for having a violent temper. The son inherited his mother's temper but he would not speak while he experienced various fits. On one occasion, the young Byron bit off a piece of a china saucer during his "silent rage". Byron's problems were compounded by his mother's lack of money, especially with her having to provide for her delinquent husband. When word reached her that John Byron had died, she cried out loud enough for her neighbourhood to hear. However, her troubles were not over, for in his final moments John Byron had incurred even more debt, which burdened his widow to the point of having to move to another home in worse conditions.

Without money, she was instead forced to send her son to a day-school at the Long Acre of Aberdeen. Byron did not learn anything at the school, and his mother was forced to hire a series of tutors who taught him literature until he was able to enter the Aberdeen Grammar School which he attended until his move back to England as a ten year old in 1798. It was here that Byron became fascinated with politics and began to practice writing narratives. Not everything taught to Byron was met with appreciation; Byron was brought up under Scottish Calvinistic influences including predestination, which encouraged a pessimistic view of life. His mother felt that Byron took in "the gloomiest Calvinistic tenets" and believed that she was also "broken against the rock of Predestination."

=== Illness and Newstead ===
In 1796, Byron suffered from scarlet fever, and his mother took him to the Scottish Highlands to stay in the mountains until his recovery. This experience affected Byron greatly, as he described in his poetry, especially his memory of the mountain of Lochnagar and a girl named Mary. He soon fell in love with another Mary, a cousin, and would still think of her until he was 27. On 21 May 1798, the death of Byron's great-uncle, the "wicked" Lord Byron, allowed the 10-year-old to become the 6th Baron Byron; he inherited the Rochdale estate in Lancashire, and Newstead Abbey in Nottinghamshire, coming under the care of his relative, Frederick Howard, Earl of Carlisle. Byron noticed no difference in how he was treated until the first time he was given the title dominus (meaning 'lord') in class; he was struck speechless and burst into tears while the other schoolchildren sat in amazement. However, little money came with the inheritance, as his great-uncle had already squandered most of his fortune; the fifth Lord Byron had sold the Rochdale estate illegally, and more money had to be put into a legal battle to restore Rochdale to Byron.

Although Newstead was not in a state that allowed Byron and his mother to live there, they were able to move to nearby Nottingham during August 1798. The residence formed by the ruins of Newstead Abbey adjoined by a large house served as an inspiration of Gothic themes and his belief that there are layers of history that are part of objects in life. During his early moments at Newstead, Byron was attended to by a nurse, May Gray, who developed a reputation for "perpetually beating him", which shocked the residents of Nottingham. These beatings occurred as she attempted to educate Byron on religion, after which she abandoned the young boy in the dark. This darkness particularly frightened Byron, as Gray led him to believe that the house was haunted at Gray's prompting. Byron's mother did not find out about these incidents until after Gray was dismissed in 1799.

When Byron was born, he suffered from lameness and a twisted foot. After Gray was fired, Byron was put in the care of a "trussmaker to the General hospital", a man named Lavender, in hopes that he could be cured; however, Lavender instead abused the boy and would occasionally use him as a servant. After Byron exposed Lavender as a fool, Gordon took her son to visit Doctor Matthew Baillie in London. They took up residence at Sloane Terrace during the summer of 1799, and there Byron started to receive treatment, such as specially designed boots. This medical treatment amounted to £150 a year with 2 guineas per school visit by the physician. Not all of Byron's experiences at Nottingham were for the worse, as Byron was popular among his relatives, such as his great-aunt Frances Byron and her Mrs Parkyns, and among the gentry, middle class, and other important individuals of Nottingham society.

=== Education ===
In August 1799, Byron entered the school of William Glennie, an Aberdonian in Dulwich. Glennie was Byron's first "serious teacher", but also one with whom Catherine Gordon would constantly squabble, especially over the control of her son's schedule. Catherine's actions alienated her from both Glennie and Lord Carlisle, with Byron unable to do anything but observe. Regardless of his suffering, Byron was able to perform his "first dash into poetry" in 1800; he wrote a love poem in honour of his cousin, Margaret Parker, "one of the most beautiful of evanescent beings"., and she would inspire another poem two years later when she died at the age of 15. Byron also refused to let his lameness prevent him from participating in any of the usual physical activities that schoolboys engage in, and on one occasion threw his leg brace into a pond in defiance.

In 1801, his mother declared "he must go to a public school", and Byron was soon after sent to Harrow. His experience at Harrow was dissatisfying to Byron as his lame foot, his lack of money, and his previously neglected education caused to say later that "I always hated Harrow till the last year and a half." The Headmaster, Dr Joseph Drury, believed that Byron was "a wild mountain colt" who had a "supersensitive vanity", and as a result placed him under the individual tutorial guidance of his own son Henry Drury, an assistant master, until he could be placed in a class of boys that were his own age. In response to the harsh treatment that he felt that he received at Harrow from the schoolmasters and some of the fellow students, Byron wrote to his mother in 1804: "I will cut myself a path through the world or perish in the attempt. Others have begun life with nothing and ended Greatly. And shall I who have a competent if not a large fortune, remain idle, No, I will carve myself the passage to Grandeur, but never with Dishonour."

While at Harrow, Byron became close to John FitzGibbon, second Earl of Clare, and with George John, fifth Earl De la Warr, and Byron retained memories of both. Clare in particular was Byron's favourite, and, after one meeting in which they could spend only five minutes together, Byron afterwards could "hardly recollect an hour of my existence which could be weighted against them". Byron had other friends at Harrow, including John Wingfield, Edward Noel Long, (grandson of Edward Long) and George, Duke of Dorset, all of whom appear in Byron's Childish Recollections. Only Long would continue to Cambridge with Byron. These friendships meant a lot to Byron, and when his friends started dying he claimed that "some curse hangs over me. I never could keep alive even a dog that I liked, or that liked me". Not all of Byron's relationships encouraged him to stay at the school. Byron's early loves included Mary Duff and Margaret Parker, his distant cousins, and Mary Chaworth, whom he met while at Harrow. Byron refused to return to Harrow in September 1803 due to his love for Chaworth. In Byron's later memoirs, according to Byron's biographer Fiona MacCarthy, "Mary Chaworth is portrayed as the first object of his adult sexual feelings". He returned to Harrow in January 1804. By Easter of that year he had begun to correspond with his half-sister, Augusta. His early letters to her illustrate his earnest desire to establish an affectionate friendship with 'a Friend to whom I can confide.'

“	Since I left Harrow, I have become idle and conceited, from scribbling rhyme and making love to women.	”
– Byron

However, his time at Harrow was not spent just in idleness or with his friends; Byron busied himself by reading books; history was his primary subject, followed by biography, poetry, philosophy, and other topics. He was originally supposed to be an orator, and he would read various passages in aloud for others. However, Byron's attitude caused problems between him and the administration at Harrow (markedly, he led a rebellion among the boys against the new headmaster, the Revd Dr George Butler) and during the 1804 Christmas holidays, Byron, at Drury's prompting, wanted to leave the school. However, Carlisle intervened and Byron stayed at Harrow until July 1805. He was accepted at Trinity College, Cambridge, where he went up the following October.

=== College ===
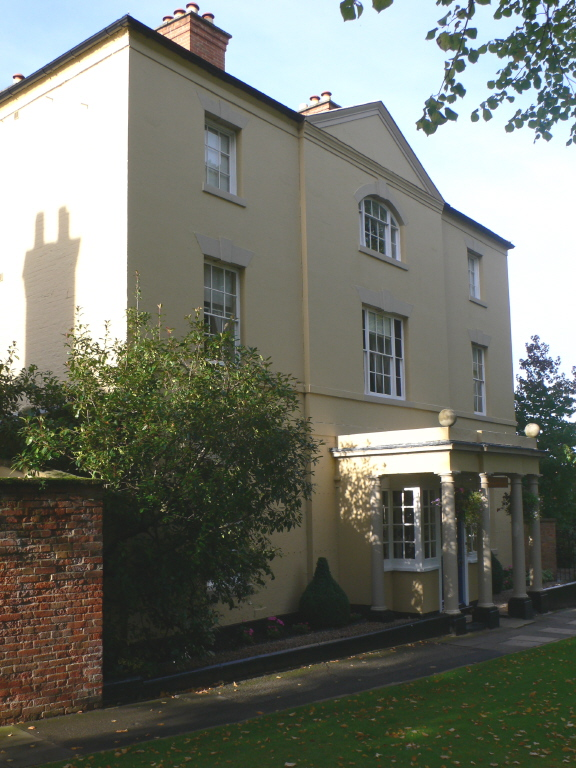
Byron's house in Southwell, Nottinghamshire

While not at school or college, Byron lived with his mother at Burgage Manor in Southwell, Nottinghamshire. Although there was some antagonism between mother and son, Byron cultivated friendships with Elizabeth Pigot and her brother, John, with whom he staged two plays for the delight of the community, along with Augusta Mary Byron, his half-sister. During this time, with the help of Elizabeth Pigot, who copied many of his rough drafts, he was encouraged to write his first volumes of poetry. Fugitive Pieces was the first, printed by Ridge of Newark, which contained poems written when Byron was only 14. However, it was promptly recalled and burned on the advice of his friend, the Reverend Thomas Becher, on account of its more amorous verses, particularly the poem "To Mary". The second edition impression of the book, called Poems on Various Occasions printed in January 1807, was given to John Pigot as a gift that he cherished until his death.

Instead of Cambridge, Byron originally wanted to go to Christ Church, Oxford but there were no vacancies. Instead, he chose Cambridge at Drury's recommendation. The choice did not matter, since college life in general did not suit his personality. He wrote in his diary, "I was so completely alone in this new world that it half broke my spirits... It was one of the deadliest and heaviest feelings of my life that I was no longer a boy". However, this did not mitigate his contempt towards the other students, and he quickly grew dissatisfied with the society surrounding Cambridge: "It is the Devil or at least his principal residence. They call it the University, but any other appellation would have suited it better, for Study is the last pursuit of the Society".

He spent his time with Long, and the two would swim, ride, read, and talk with each other. However, they shared a fear of becoming overweight, and this marked the beginning of Byron's "Thinning Campaign". Long was not Byron's only companion during this time; he had a short-lived friendship with John Edleston, a fifteen-year-old choirboy. About his "protégé" he wrote, "He has been my almost constant associate since October, 1805. His voice first attracted my attention, his countenance fixed it, and his manners attached me to him for ever." The boy gave Byron a carnelian ring, in return for saving his life, and to which Byron wrote The Cornelian in October 1806:

He offer'd it with downcast look,
As fearful that I might refuse it;
I told him, when the gift I took,
My only fear should be, to lose it.

The two planned to live together after Edleston grew older, but the two parted and Byron would never see the boy again as Edleston died from consumption in 1811. As well as spending time with friends, Byron did join in with the rest of the community; however, he did not enjoy this time because, as he said, "I could not share in the commonplace libertinism of the place and time without disgust. And yet this very disgust, and my heart thrown back upon itself, threw me into excesses perhaps more fatal than those from which I shrunk, as fixing upon one (at a time) the passions which, spread amongst many, would have hurt only myself".

== See also ==
Lord Byron (main article)
