= Mary Pelham, Countess of Chichester =

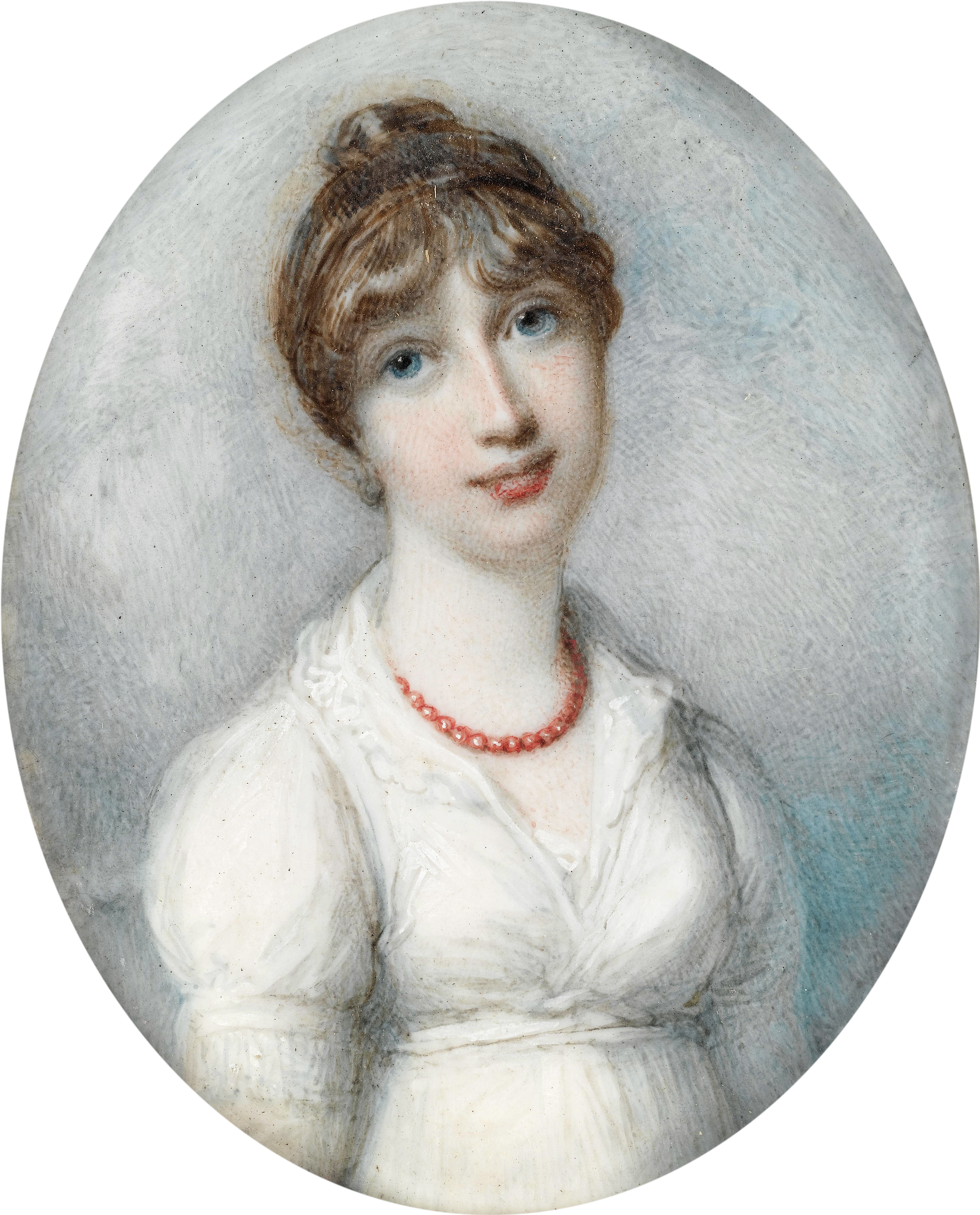
Mary, Countess of Chichester (Richard Cosway)

Mary Pelham, Countess of Chichester (7 September 1776 – 21 October 1862), formerly Lady Mary Henrietta Juliana Osborne, was the wife of Thomas Pelham, 2nd Earl of Chichester.

She was born in Grosvenor Square, London, the daughter of Francis Osborne, 5th Duke of Leeds, and his first wife Amelia (née Darcy), whom he divorced in 1779, following the scandal of her affair with Captain John Byron, whom she subsequently married. Amelia died in 1784, by which time Mary's father had remarried, his second wife being the former Catherine Anguish, who had two children, a half-brother and half-sister to Mary and her older brothers George and Francis. Through her mother's remarriage, she was a half-sister to Augusta Leigh.

Lady Mary married the future earl on 16 July 1801 at Lambeth Palace. They had four sons and six daughters, including:

- Henry Pelham, 3rd Earl of Chichester (1804-1886)
- Lady Amelia Rose Pelham (1806-1884), who married, as his second wife, Maj.-Gen. Sir Joshua Jebb
- Rear-Admiral the Hon. Frederick Thomas Pelham (1808-1861), who married Ellen Kate Mitchell and had children
- The Right Reverend John Thomas Pelham, Bishop of Norwich (1811-1894), who married Henrietta Tatton and had children
- Lady Catherine Georgiana Pelham (1814-1885), who married Rev Hon Lowther John Barrington and had children
- Lady Lucy Anne Pelham (1815-1901), who married Sir David Dundas and had one child

On 8 January 1805 Pelham succeeded to the earldom and Mary accordingly became Countess of Chichester. The earl died in July 1826, aged 70, and was succeeded in his titles by his eldest son, Henry. The countess died in October 1862 at her home in Grosvenor Square, aged 86.
