= Mary Darcy, Countess of Holderness =

The Right Honourable The Countess of Holderness
- Mary, Countess of Holderness by Jean-Étienne Liotard, 1745, Kupferstichkabinett, Staatliche Museen zu Berlin
- Full name: Mary Darcy (née Maria Doublet)
- Born: 14 September 1721; Delft, Netherlands
- Died: 3 October 1801 (aged 79–80); London
- Spouse: Robert Darcy, 4th Earl of Holderness
- Issue: George Darcy, Lord Darcy and Conyers; Thomas Darcy, Lord Darcy and Conyers; Lady Amelia Darcy
- Father: Frans (François) Doublet van Groenevelt (July 18 1688 's-Gravenhage - September 11, 1725 Delft)
- Mother: Anna Constantia Van der Beek (September 28, 1697 den Haag - April 7, 1723 Delft)

Mary Darcy, Countess of Holderness (c.1721 – 13 October 1801), formerly Maria Doublet, was the wife of Robert Darcy, 4th Earl of Holderness.

== Early Life ==
Mary was the daughter of Frans (or François) Doublet van Groenevelt and Constance Catharina (or Anna Constantia) van der Beek.

She married Robert, Earl of Holderness, in the English Episcopal Church in Rotterdam on 19 November 1743 (sometimes incorrectly recorded as November 1742).

Mary and the Earl had three children, only one of whom reached adulthood. They were:

- George Darcy, Lord Darcy and Conyers (1745-1747)
- Thomas Darcy, Lord Darcy and Conyers (born and died 1750)
- Lady Amelia Darcy (1754-1784), who married firstly Francis Osborne, Marquess of Carmarthen, and had children. Following their divorce in 1779, Amelia married John "Mad Jack" Byron, father of Lord Byron, and had one daughter, Augusta Leigh.

Robert D'Arcy, 4th Earl of Holderness, pastel by Jean-Étienne Liotard, 1745 (Kupferstichkabinett, Staatliche Museen zu Berlin)

After their marriage, the couple moved to Venice where the Earl served as British Ambassador until the autumn of 1746. In May 1749 he became minister plenipotentiary at the Hague for a two-year appointment. The couple returned to England in 1751 and remained until March 1761 when the Earl was dismissed from public office with an annual pension of £4,000. Thereafter they embarked on a European tour.

== The 'Queen of Smugglers' ==
Towards the end of July 1764, the Earl and Countess returned to England after several years touring Continental Europe. Arriving at Calais, they chartered a barque for the journey; when the ship arrived at port in Dover, customs officers boarded the vessel and searched their luggage.

In the mid 18^{th} Century, strict import controls were applied to protect the domestic textile industry, particularly luxury products such as Spitalfields silk. It was generally illegal to import foreign silks, Indian chintz and cotton although the wealthy and well connected tended to take a chance and hope they wouldn’t get caught.

Mary was caught. Her trunks contained 114 expensive gowns from Paris along with silk and chinz fabric ready to be sewn into more dresses for her and waistcoats for the Earl. Almost everything was seized and confiscated; Mary and her husband were left with little more clothing than they had put on that morning.

The seizure led to a general clampdown at the ports to the horror of London society. Horace Walpole wrote to George Montagu in 1769:

‘I could certainly buy many things for you [in Paris] that you would like, the relics of the last age's magnificence; but since my Lady Holderness invaded the Custom House with an hundred and fourteen gowns in the reign of that twopenny monarch, George Greville, the ports are so guarded, that not a soul but a smuggler, can smuggle anything into England’.

Baroness Holland commented, ‘Lady Holderness has done us all great mischief – indeed the officers are so exceeding strict just now, ‘tis a bad time to attempt getting anything from abroad’.

In October 1765, the Earl was able to take up an appointment as warden of the Cinque Ports which came with an official residence at Walmer Castle which was perfect for Mary's dislike of paying duty on imported goods. Her friend Lady Mary Coke stayed with her in 1768. She recorded in her diary entry for June 17 that, after breakfast, she walked to Deal with Lady Holderness. There, the countess took Lady Mary to the houses of three men (known smugglers!) who imported Indian goods, including silks, muslin, and tea. The muslin, Lady Mary recorded with glee, was half the price she would expect to pay in London. Horace Walpole called Mary 'The Queen of the Smugglers'.

== Later Life ==
Mary (née Doublet), Countess of Holderness by Henry Bone, June 1802 (National Portrait Gallery)

From 1770 until her death in 1801, the Countess of Holderness was a Lady of the Bedchamber to Charlotte of Mecklenburg-Strelitz, queen consort of King George III of the United Kingdom.

In 1777, Horace Walpole referred in a letter to "a great breach in the house of Holderness", caused by Amelia and her husband having shielded a young couple who had eloped; her mother is said to have banished her from her presence for this. Amelia died in 1784, and Augusta was largely brought up by her grandmother, the countess, until the latter died in 1801.

The countess's portrait was painted in 1745 by Jean-Étienne Liotard. A sale of her goods, which included paintings, was held in London on 6 March 1802. She was a patron of the poet William Mason, who died in 1797.
