= Countess of Holderness =

Countess of Holderness is a title normally given to the wife of the Earl of Holderness. Women who have held the title include:

- Frances Darcy, Countess of Holderness (1618–1681)
- Frederica Mildmay, Countess of Mértola (1687–1751)
- Mary Darcy, Countess of Holderness (c.1721-1801)
