= Robert Darcy, 4th Earl of Holderness =

British diplomat and politician

The Right Honourable The Earl of Holderness PC
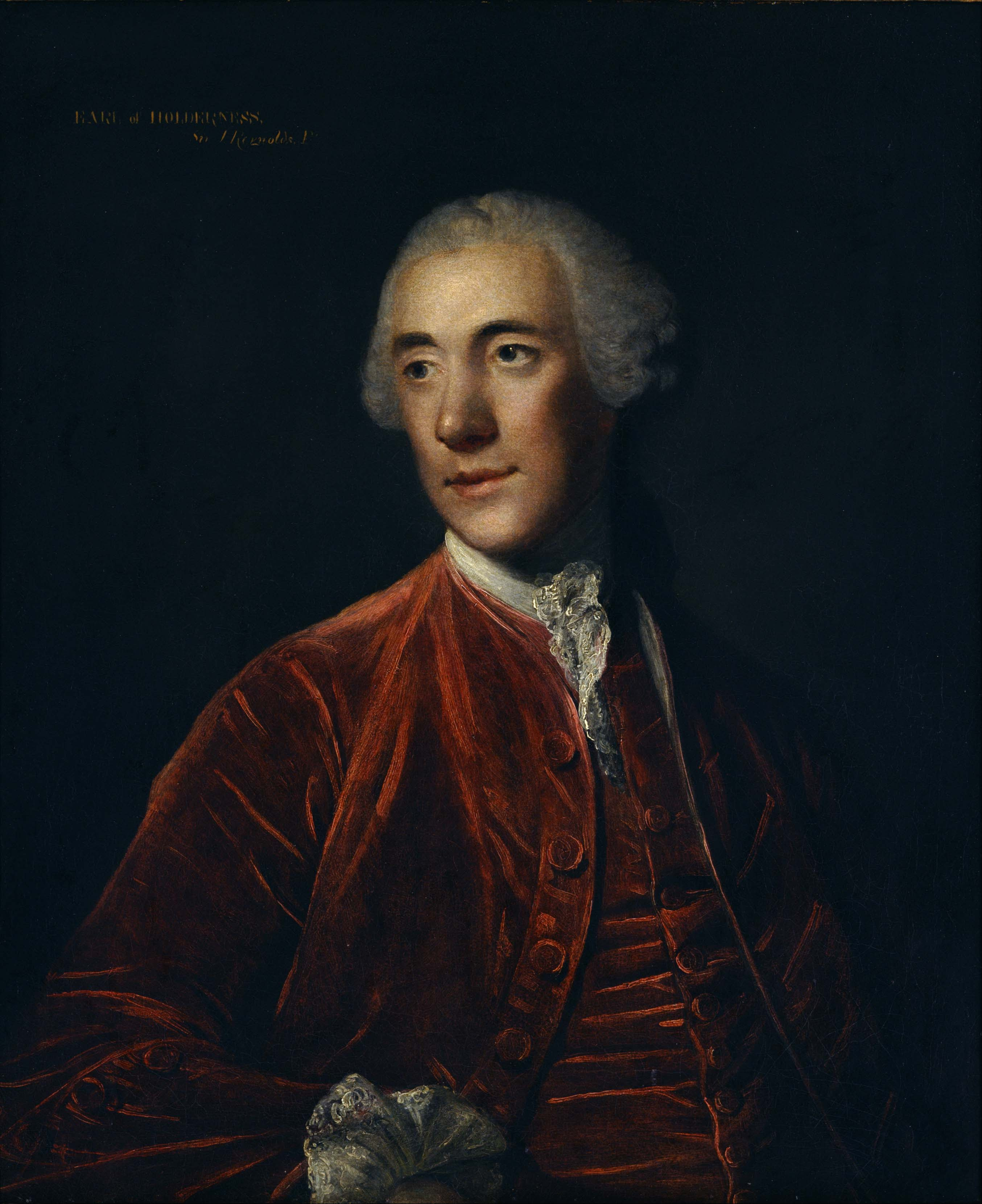

Secretary of State for the Southern Department
- In office 6 April 1757 – 27 June 1757
- Monarch: George II
- Preceded by: William Pitt
- Succeeded by: William Pitt
- In office 18 June 1751 – 23 March 1754
- Monarch: George II
- Preceded by: The Duke of Bedford
- Succeeded by: Thomas Robinson

Secretary of State for the Northern Department
- In office 23 March 1754 – 25 March 1761
- Monarchs: George II; George III
- Preceded by: The Duke of Newcastle
- Succeeded by: The Earl of Bute

Personal details
- Born: 17 May 1718
- Died: 16 May 1778 (aged 59) Syon Hill, London, England
- Spouse: Mary Doublet
- Children: Amelia Osborne, Marchioness of Carmarthen
- Parent(s): Robert Darcy, 3rd Earl of Holderness; Lady Frederica Schomberg
- Occupation: Diplomat, politician

Robert Darcy, 4th Earl of Holderness, PC (17 May 1718 – 16 May 1778), known before 1721 as Lord Darcy and Conyers, was a British diplomat and politician who served as Secretary of State for the Northern Department from 1754 to 1761.

== Career ==
In 1741 he collaborated with G.F. Handel in the production of Deidamia. From 1744 to 1746 he was ambassador at Venice and from 1749 to 1751 he represented his country at The Hague. In 1751 he became Secretary of State for the Southern Department, transferring in 1754 to the Northern Department, and he remained in office until March 1761, when he was dismissed by King George III in favour of Lord Bute, although he had largely been a cipher in that position to the stronger personalities of his colleagues, successively the Duke of Newcastle, Thomas Robinson, Henry Fox, and William Pitt the Elder. From 1771 to 1776 he acted as governor to two of the King's sons, a solemn phantom as Horace Walpole calls him. He left no sons who survived childhood, and all his titles became extinct except the Baronies of Darcy de Knayth and Conyers, which were baronies by writ inherited from his father, and the Portuguese countship of Mértola, inherited from his mother. In those peerages, he was succeeded by his daughter, Amelia Osborne, Marchioness of Carmarthen.

David Hume wrote, "It is remarkable that this family of d'Arcy [sic] seems to be the only male descendant of any of the Conqueror's barons now remaining among the Peers. Lord Holdernessae [sic] is the heir of that family".

== Family ==
He was the only surviving son of Robert Darcy, 3rd Earl of Holderness, and his wife Lady Frederica Schomberg. On 29 October 1743, Darcy married Mary Doublet, daughter of Francis Doublet and Constantia Van-der-Beck. The couple had three children, only one of whom survived childhood:

- George Darcy, Lord Darcy and Conyers (September 1745 – 27 September 1747)
- Thomas Darcy, Lord Darcy and Conyers (born and died 1750), buried 29 July 1750 in the Great or St. James Church in The Hague, the Netherlands
- Lady Amelia Darcy (12 October 1754 – 27 January 1784); married firstly Francis Osborne, Marquess of Carmarthen, and had issue. The couple divorced in 1779. She married secondly John "Mad Jack" Byron, father of Lord Byron, and had one surviving daughter, Augusta Leigh.

== See also ==
- Great Britain in the Seven Years War

== Portraits ==
Robert D'Arcy, 4th Earl of Holderness, pastel by Jean-Étienne Liotard, 1745 (Kupferstichkabinett, Staatliche Museen zu Berlin)

Mary, Countess of Holderness by Jean-Étienne Liotard, 1745, Kupferstichkabinett, Staatliche Museen zu Berlin

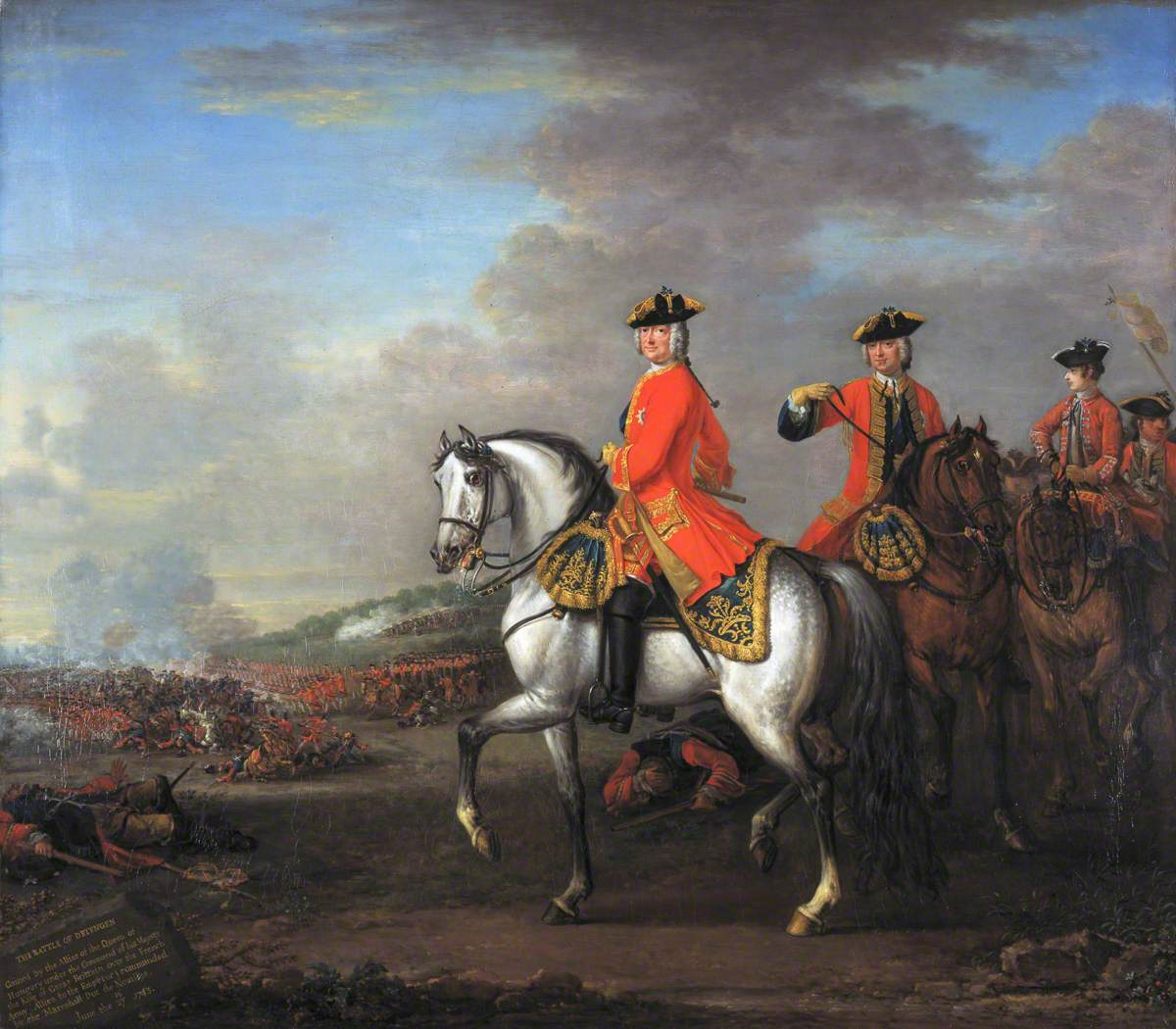
John Wootton (c.1682-1764) - George II at the Battle of Dettingen, with the Duke of Cumberland and Robert, 4th Earl of Holderness, 27 June 1743 - NAM. 1961-07-116 - National Army Museum

George Knapton (1698-1778) - Robert d'Arcy (1718–1778), 4th Earl of Holderness (Temple Newsam)

Bookplate of Robert Darcy Earl of Holderness

Arms of the 4th Earl of Holderness, inherited by the Dukes of Leeds

Diplomatic posts
Preceded by ?	Minister at Venice; 1744–1746	Succeeded by Sir James Gray
Preceded by ?	Minister at the Hague; 1749–1751	Succeeded by Joseph Yorke
Political offices
Preceded by The Duke of Bedford	Secretary of State for the Southern Department; 1751–1754	Succeeded by Thomas Robinson
Preceded by The Duke of Newcastle	Secretary of State for the Northern Department; 1754–1761	Succeeded by The Earl of Bute
Preceded by William Pitt	Secretary of State for the Southern Department; 1757	Succeeded by William Pitt
Honorary titles
Preceded by Sir Conyers Darcy	Lord Lieutenant of the North Riding of Yorkshire; 1740–1778	Succeeded by The Earl Fauconberg
Preceded by The Marquess of Rockingham	Custos Rotulorum of the North Riding of Yorkshire; 1762–1765	Succeeded by The Marquess of Rockingham
Preceded by The Marquess of Rockingham	Vice-Admiral of Yorkshire; 1763–1776	Succeeded by The Marquess of Rockingham
Preceded by The Duke of Dorset	Lord Warden of the Cinque Ports; 1765–1778	Succeeded by The Lord North
Peerage of England
Preceded by Robert Darcy	Earl of Holderness; 1722–1778	Extinct
Preceded by Robert Darcy	Baron Darcy de Knayth and Conyers; 1722–1778	Succeeded by Amelia Osborne
Portuguese nobility
Preceded by Frederica Mildmay	Count of Mértola; 1751–1778	Succeeded by Amelia Osborne
