= Elizabeth Medora Leigh =

Third daughter of Augusta Leigh (1814–1849)

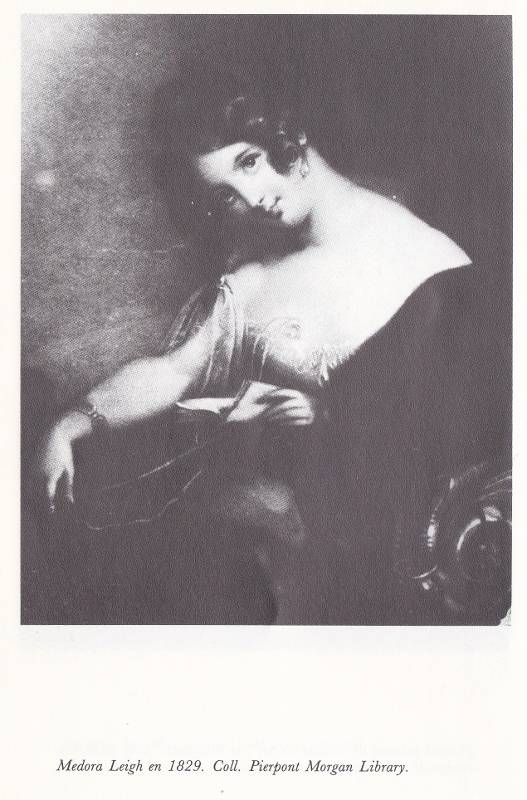
- Elizabeth Medora Leigh
- Born: 15 April 1814
- Died: 28 August 1849 (aged 35); Versols-et-Lapeyre, France
- Resting place: Versols-et-Lapeyre
- Spouse: Jean-Louis Taillefer
- Partner: Henry Trevanion
- Children: Marie Violette Trevanion; Elie Taillefer
- Parent(s): George Leigh (legally); George Gordon Byron, 6th Baron Byron (presumed); Augusta Leigh

Elizabeth Medora Leigh (15 April 1814 – 28 August 1849) was the third daughter of Augusta Leigh. It is widely speculated that she was fathered by her mother's half-brother Lord Byron; this is supported by comments from his widow, even though her mother's husband, Colonel George Leigh, was her legal father.

== Birth ==
She was born the middle child of seven. Three days after her birth, Byron visited Augusta and the baby. He later wrote to a friend, Lady Melbourne: "Oh! but it is 'worth while' – I can't tell you why – and it is not an Ape and if it is – that must be my fault." The child's middle name was taken from the heroine of Byron's poem The Corsair. In the family, she was known as Elizabeth or "Libby", but she also later used the name Medora. In 1816, the scandal over his separation from his wife Annabella, rumours surrounding his relationship with Augusta, and mounting debts forced Byron to leave England. He never returned.

== Early life ==
Augusta's husband, George, never questioned the paternity of Medora, and she grew up among her brothers and sisters unaware that she might be the first of Byron's three daughters. As a young teenager, she was seduced by her brother-in-law, Henry Trevanion, unhappily married to her older sister Georgiana. She had accompanied the couple when they took up residence in Canterbury in a house belonging to their aunt, Lady Byron. When neighbours reported the scandalous appearance of an apparently pregnant unwed teenager to Lady Byron, she arranged for the trio to travel to France, where the child was born and placed for adoption. Medora returned home, but the relationship continued and she became pregnant again. The three departed for Bath to stay in a house of one of Henry's relatives in an attempt to hide the second pregnancy from Medora's father, Colonel Leigh. The Colonel was eventually informed, and after travelling to Bath with an attorney removed her from the Trevanions and sent Medora to an establishment in London, to give birth in secrecy. After she miscarried, Henry arranged for her escape and in 1831 the couple eloped to France.

== Marriage and life in France ==
Henry Trevanion and Medora set up in an ancient, tumble-down chateau near Morlaix in France, living under the surname Aubin. By 1833 Henry and Medora were living in Brittany, at the Breton Carhaix.

Medora became a Catholic and declared her intention of entering a convent; however, she was pregnant again. The Abbess found Medora lodgings outside the convent, where a daughter was born on 19 May 1834. She was baptised Marie Violette Trevanion on 21 May 1834.

Due to poverty and illness, the pair eventually had to beg their families for money. Henry's father, Major John Bettesworth Trevanion, sent one of Henry's uncles to Brittany to persuade Henry to return to England. Henry refused to leave. Augusta Leigh was now keeping her other daughter Georgiana's three children by Henry, but sent what money she could to Medora. However, Augusta eventually lost touch with Medora, who had become ill in Brittany after a series of miscarriages.

In 1838, Henry Trevanion and Medora Leigh parted permanently. In her 1844 autobiography, Medora later wrote of Henry that he "gave himself up to religion and shooting".

Medora and her daughter were supported financially and emotionally for a number of years by Byron's widow, Annabella Milbanke, and by Byron's only legitimate daughter, Ada Lovelace. Milbanke told Lovelace that Medora was her half-sister and had been fathered by Byron.

Medora had an affair with a French officer, who then abandoned her. She ultimately ended up partnered with his servant, former sergeant Jean-Louis Taillefer, with whom she went to live in south Aveyron, in Versols et Lapeyre. They had a son, Elie (1846–1900). Leigh and Taillefer married on 23 August 1848.

== Death ==
Medora died on 28 August 1849 from smallpox in Versols-et-Lapeyre, Aveyron, southern France, where her grave can be visited (a tombstone was erected in the 1960s). Henry died in 1855 in Brittany, France. Her daughter Marie Violette entered a convent in 1856 under the name "Sister St. Hilaire" and is said to have died within the order in 1873.

Elie grew up with the Byron temper where he was removed from two Jesuit schools before being trained as in accounting becoming a poor traveling salesman but inherited 1044 francs from his father up his death. He married a Constance Lavail in Sète but had no children. There he was buried in a common grave.

== See also ==
- Allegra Byron
- Annabella Milbanke
- Ada Lovelace
