= Catherine Osborne =

Catherine Osborne may refer to:

- Catherine Osborne, Duchess of Leeds (1764–1837), second wife of Francis Osborne, 5th Duke of Leeds
- Catherine Isabella Osborne (1818–1880), Irish artist, writer and patron
- Catherine Rowett, who published as Catherine Osborne from 1979 to 2011, professor of philosophy
