= Saint-Félix-de-Sorgues =

Commune in Occitanie, France

- Commune
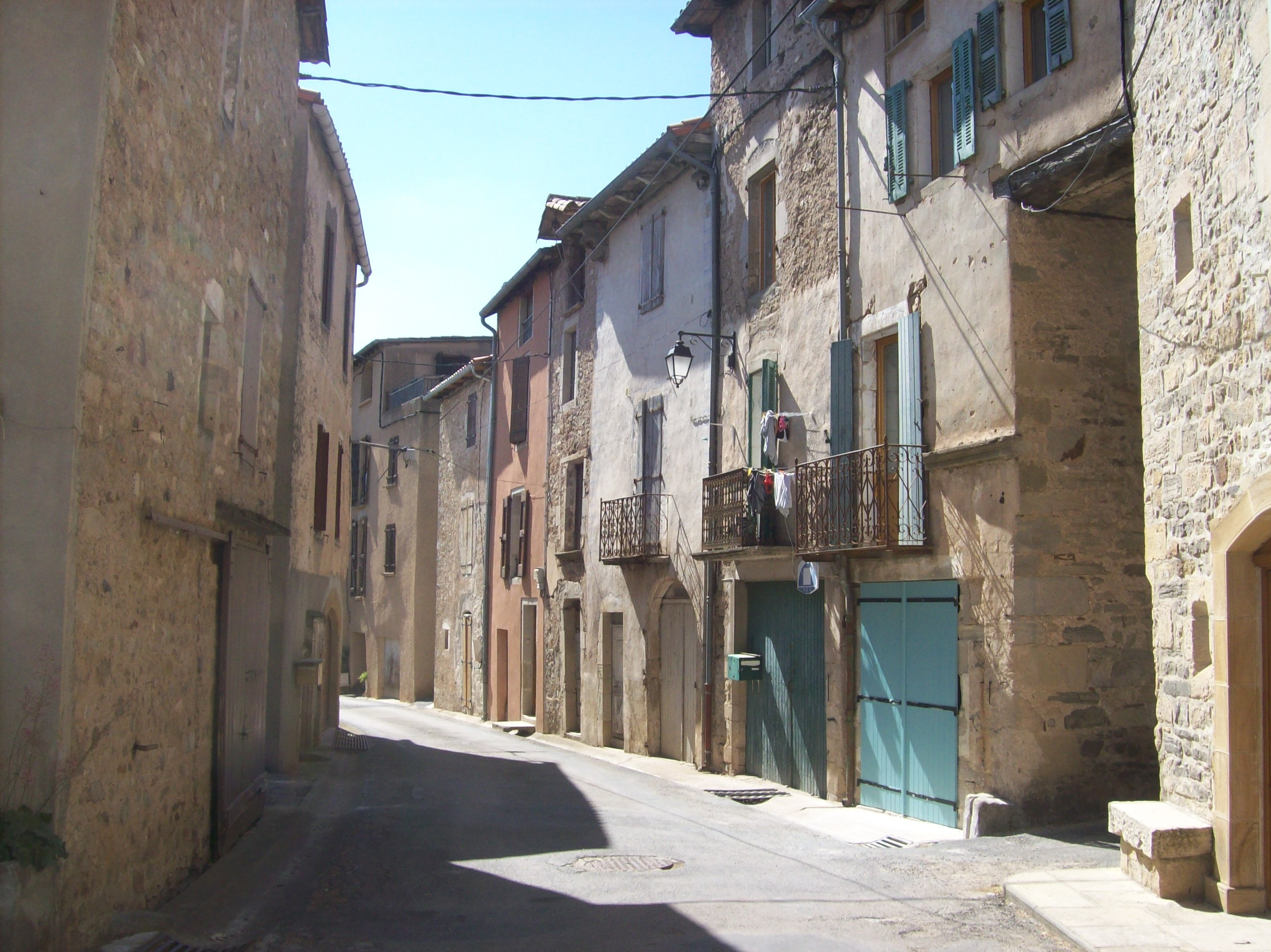
- The main street in Saint-Félix-de-Sorgues

- Coat of arms
- Location of Saint-Félix-de-Sorgues
- Location within France Location within Occitanie
- Coordinates: 43°53′06″N 2°59′05″E
- Country: France
- Region: Occitania
- Department: Aveyron
- Arrondissement: Millau
- Canton: Saint-Affrique

Government
  - Mayor (2020–2026): Bertrand Schmitt
- Area^{1}: 29 km^{2} (11 sq mi)
- Highest elevation: 745 m (2,444 ft)
- Lowest elevation: 375 m (1,230 ft)
- Population (2023): 204
  - Density: 7.0/km^{2} (18/sq mi)
- Time zone: UTC+01:00 (CET)
  - Summer (DST): UTC+02:00 (CEST)
- INSEE/Postal code: 12222 /12400
- ^{1} French Land Register data, which excludes lakes, ponds, glaciers > 1 km^{2} (0.386 sq mi or 247 acres) and river estuaries.

Saint-Félix-de-Sorgues (French pronunciation: [sɛ̃ feliks də sɔʁɡ], literally Saint-Félix of Sorgues; Languedocien: Sant Faliç) is a commune in the Aveyron department in southern France.

== Geography ==
The village lies on the right bank of the Sorgues, which flows west through the middle of the commune.

== Population ==
Historical population
Year	Pop.	±% p.a.
1968	228	—
1975	202	−1.71%
1982	183	−1.40%
1990	206	+1.49%
1999	196	−0.55%
2007	199	+0.19%
2012	217	+1.75%
2017	213	−0.37%
2023	204	−0.72%
Source: INSEE

== See also ==
- Communes of the Aveyron department
