= Marnhagues-et-Latour =

Commune in Occitanie, France

- Commune
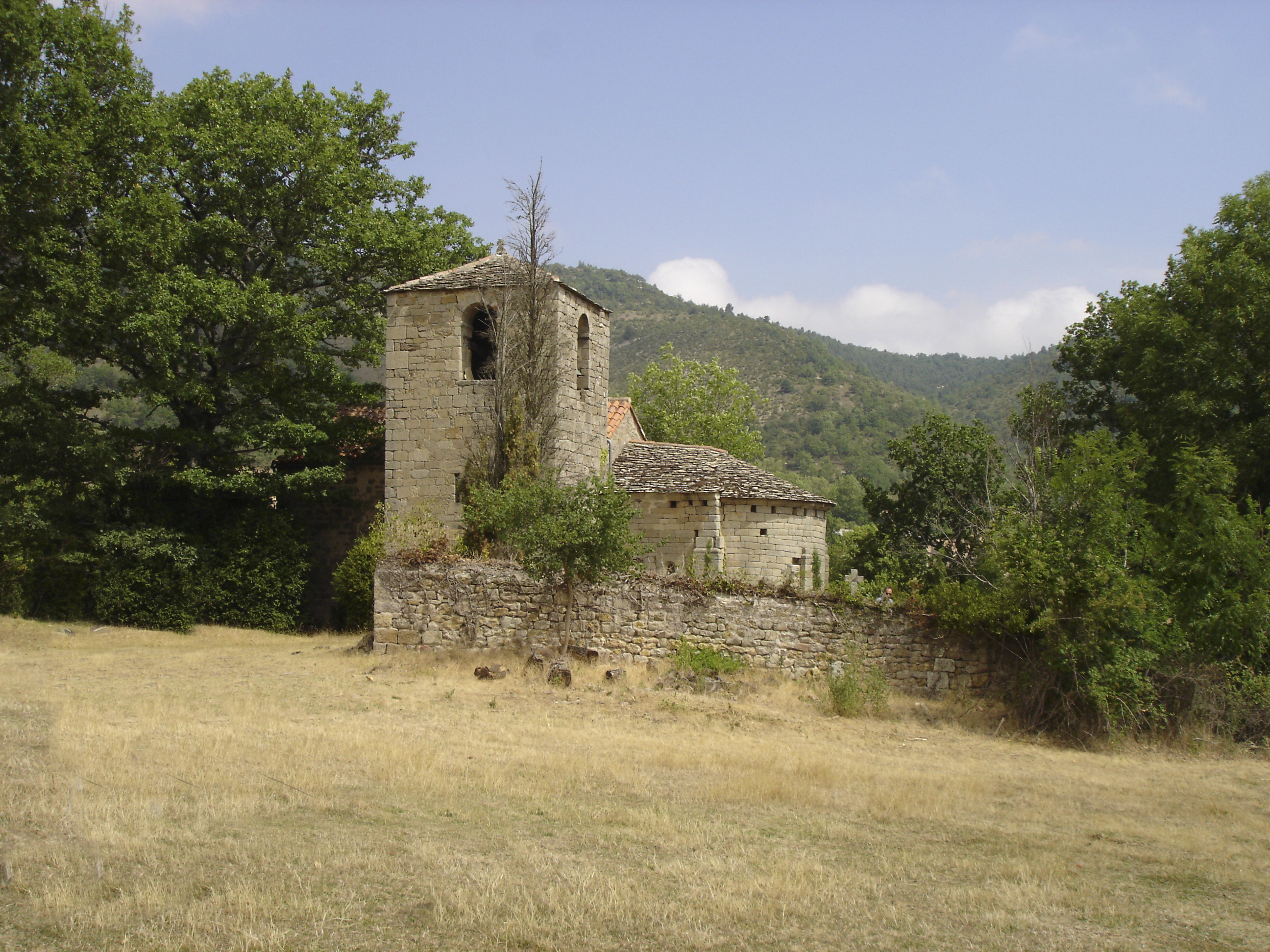
- The Chapel of Manhargues
- Location of Marnhagues-et-Latour
- Location within France Location within Occitanie
- Coordinates: 43°52′24″N 3°01′50″E
- Country: France
- Region: Occitania
- Department: Aveyron
- Arrondissement: Millau
- Canton: Causses-Rougiers

Government
  - Mayor (2020–2026): Jérôme Thibault-Laurent
- Area^{1}: 21.92 km^{2} (8.46 sq mi)
- Elevation: 422 m (1,385 ft)
- Highest elevation: 762 m (2,500 ft)
- Lowest elevation: 396 m (1,299 ft)
- Population (2023): 147
  - Density: 6.71/km^{2} (17.4/sq mi)
- Time zone: UTC+01:00 (CET)
  - Summer (DST): UTC+02:00 (CEST)
- INSEE/Postal code: 12139 /12540
- ^{1} French Land Register data, which excludes lakes, ponds, glaciers > 1 km^{2} (0.386 sq mi or 247 acres) and river estuaries.

Marnhagues-et-Latour (French pronunciation: [maʁnaɡ e latuʁ]; Occitan: Marnhagas e la Tor) is a commune in the Aveyron department in southern France.

== Geography ==
The Sorgues flows west-northwest through the commune; the Latour hamlet lies on its right bank. The Marnhagues hamlet lies in the valley of the Matas brook, a tributary of the Sorgues. The third hamlet in the commune, Laroquaubel, lies in the valley of the Annou, another tributary of the Sorgues.

== Population ==
Historical population
Year	Pop.	±% p.a.
1968	144	—
1975	146	+0.20%
1982	132	−1.43%
1990	102	−3.17%
1999	132	+2.91%
2007	144	+1.09%
2012	125	−2.79%
2017	139	+2.15%
2023	147	+0.94%
Source: INSEE

== Sights ==
- The Nonenque Charterhouse (French: Chartreuse Notre-Dame du Précieux Sang or Chartreuse de Nonenque) lies north of Laroquaubel, in the same valley.

== See also ==
- Communes of the Aveyron department
