= Cornus, Aveyron =

Commune in Occitanie, France

Cornus
- Commune
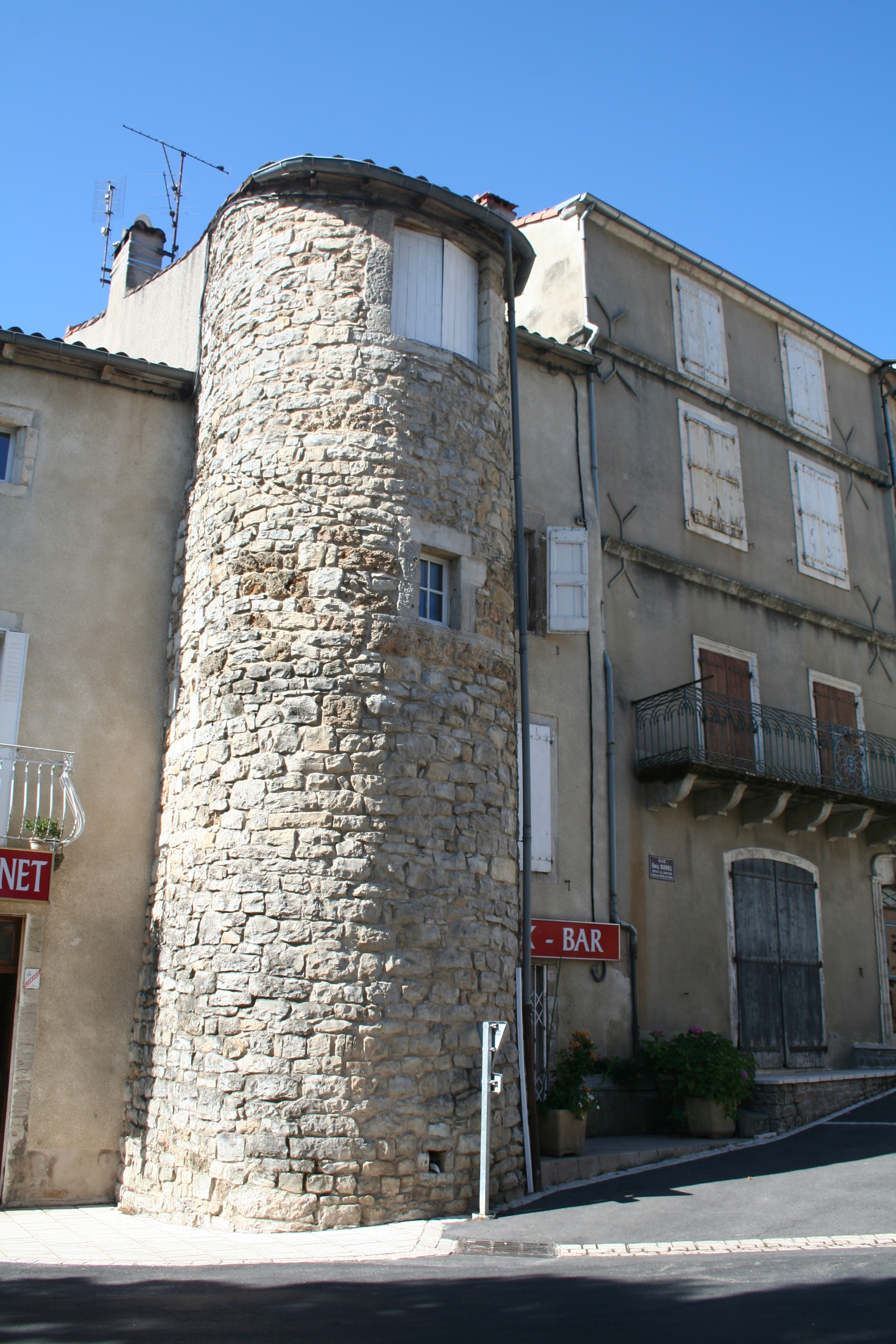
- Tour de l'Aiguillon

- Coat of arms
- Location of Cornus
- Location within France Location within Occitanie
- Coordinates: 43°54′11″N 3°10′46″E
- Country: France
- Region: Occitania
- Department: Aveyron
- Arrondissement: Millau
- Canton: Causses-Rougiers

Government
  - Mayor (2020–2026): Christophe Laborie (UDI)
- Area^{1}: 92.74 km^{2} (35.81 sq mi)
- Elevation: 630 m (2,070 ft)
- Highest elevation: 887 m (2,910 ft)
- Lowest elevation: 496 m (1,627 ft)
- Population (2023): 512
  - Density: 5.52/km^{2} (14.3/sq mi)
- Time zone: UTC+01:00 (CET)
  - Summer (DST): UTC+02:00 (CEST)
- INSEE/Postal code: 12077 /12540
- ^{1} French Land Register data, which excludes lakes, ponds, glaciers > 1 km^{2} (0.386 sq mi or 247 acres) and river estuaries.

Cornus (French pronunciation: [kɔʁnys]; Occitan: Cornús) is a commune in the Aveyron department in southern France.

== Geography ==
The commune lies on the causse du Larzac.

The village lies in the valley of the Dèvre, a tributary of the Sorgues, which has its source in the commune.

Climate data for Cornus (1991–2020 averages)
| Month | Jan | Feb | Mar | Apr | May | Jun | Jul | Aug | Sep | Oct | Nov | Dec | Year |
|---|---|---|---|---|---|---|---|---|---|---|---|---|---|
| Record high °C (°F) | 20.7 (69.3) | 22.0 (71.6) | 22.3 (72.1) | 27.3 (81.1) | 29.2 (84.6) | 36.1 (97.0) | 35.0 (95.0) | 38.6 (101.5) | 31.7 (89.1) | 28.8 (83.8) | 21.6 (70.9) | 20.0 (68.0) | 38.6 (101.5) |
| Mean daily maximum °C (°F) | 6.1 (43.0) | 7.0 (44.6) | 10.9 (51.6) | 14.4 (57.9) | 17.7 (63.9) | 23.0 (73.4) | 25.9 (78.6) | 25.5 (77.9) | 21.1 (70.0) | 15.8 (60.4) | 10.3 (50.5) | 7.3 (45.1) | 15.4 (59.7) |
| Mean daily minimum °C (°F) | −1.4 (29.5) | −2.0 (28.4) | 0.2 (32.4) | 3.1 (37.6) | 6.4 (43.5) | 10.0 (50.0) | 11.9 (53.4) | 11.5 (52.7) | 8.4 (47.1) | 6.4 (43.5) | 2.7 (36.9) | −0.6 (30.9) | 4.7 (40.5) |
| Record low °C (°F) | −17.9 (−0.2) | −15.4 (4.3) | −17.3 (0.9) | −10.3 (13.5) | −4.5 (23.9) | −0.1 (31.8) | 4.3 (39.7) | 2.6 (36.7) | −2.9 (26.8) | −7.4 (18.7) | −10.8 (12.6) | −14.0 (6.8) | −17.9 (−0.2) |
| Average precipitation mm (inches) | 87.1 (3.43) | 70.6 (2.78) | 75.8 (2.98) | 95.9 (3.78) | 88.2 (3.47) | 49.8 (1.96) | 36.1 (1.42) | 55.4 (2.18) | 84.3 (3.32) | 140.8 (5.54) | 141.0 (5.55) | 82.4 (3.24) | 1,007.4 (39.66) |
| Average precipitation days | 10.4 | 8.9 | 10.2 | 9.2 | 8.8 | 5.7 | 4.9 | 6.1 | 5.5 | 9.6 | 11.0 | 10.3 | 100.7 |
Source: Météo France

== Population ==
Historical population
| Year | Pop. | ±% p.a. |
|---|---|---|
| 1968 | 513 | — |
| 1975 | 510 | −0.08% |
| 1982 | 434 | −2.28% |
| 1990 | 345 | −2.83% |
| 1999 | 364 | +0.60% |
| 2007 | 511 | +4.33% |
| 2012 | 500 | −0.43% |
| 2017 | 524 | +0.94% |
| 2023 | 512 | −0.39% |
Source: INSEE

== See also ==
- Communes of the Aveyron department
