= Fondamente =

Commune in Occitanie, France

- Commune
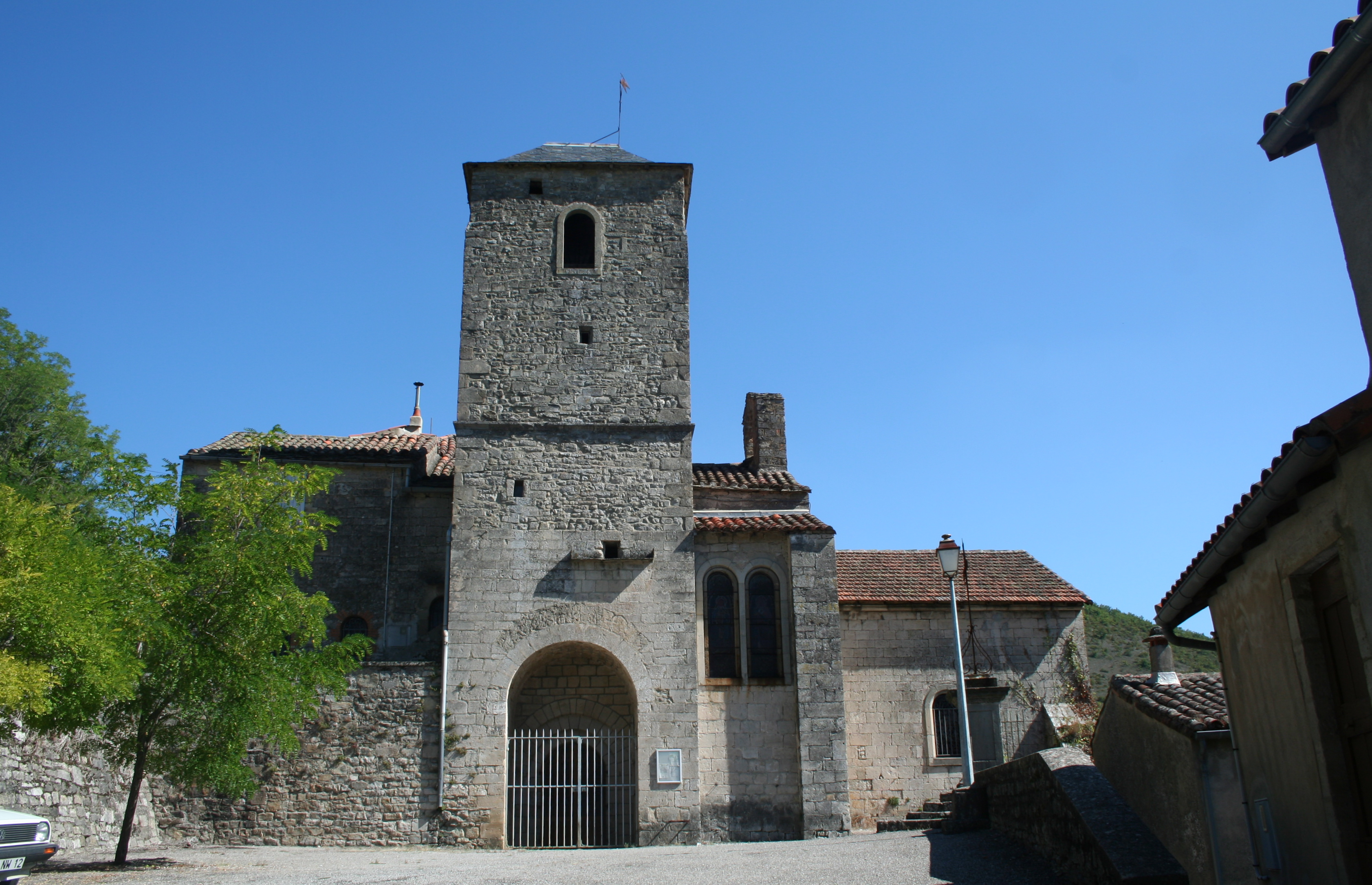
- The church of Saint-Pierre

- Coat of arms
- Location of Fondamente
- Location within France Location within Occitanie
- Coordinates: 43°52′38″N 3°07′28″E
- Country: France
- Region: Occitania
- Department: Aveyron
- Arrondissement: Millau
- Canton: Causses-Rougiers

Government
  - Mayor (2020–2026): Martine Rodriguez
- Area^{1}: 50.58 km^{2} (19.53 sq mi)
- Elevation: 480 m (1,570 ft)
- Highest elevation: 844 m (2,769 ft)
- Lowest elevation: 422 m (1,385 ft)
- Population (2023): 318
  - Density: 6.29/km^{2} (16.3/sq mi)
- Time zone: UTC+01:00 (CET)
  - Summer (DST): UTC+02:00 (CEST)
- INSEE/Postal code: 12155 /12540
- ^{1} French Land Register data, which excludes lakes, ponds, glaciers > 1 km^{2} (0.386 sq mi or 247 acres) and river estuaries.

Fondamente (French pronunciation: [fɔ̃damɑ̃t]; Occitan: Fondamenta, before 1987: Montpaon) is a commune in the Aveyron department in southern France.

== Geography ==
The village lies on the right bank of the Sorgues, which flows west-southwest through the northern part of the commune.

== Population ==
Historical population
Year	Pop.	±% p.a.
1968	361	—
1975	302	−2.52%
1982	295	−0.33%
1990	316	+0.86%
1999	303	−0.47%
2007	287	−0.68%
2012	321	+2.26%
2017	327	+0.37%
2023	318	−0.46%
Source: INSEE

== See also ==
- Communes of the Aveyron department
