= Sorgues (river) =

River in Southern France

Sorgue
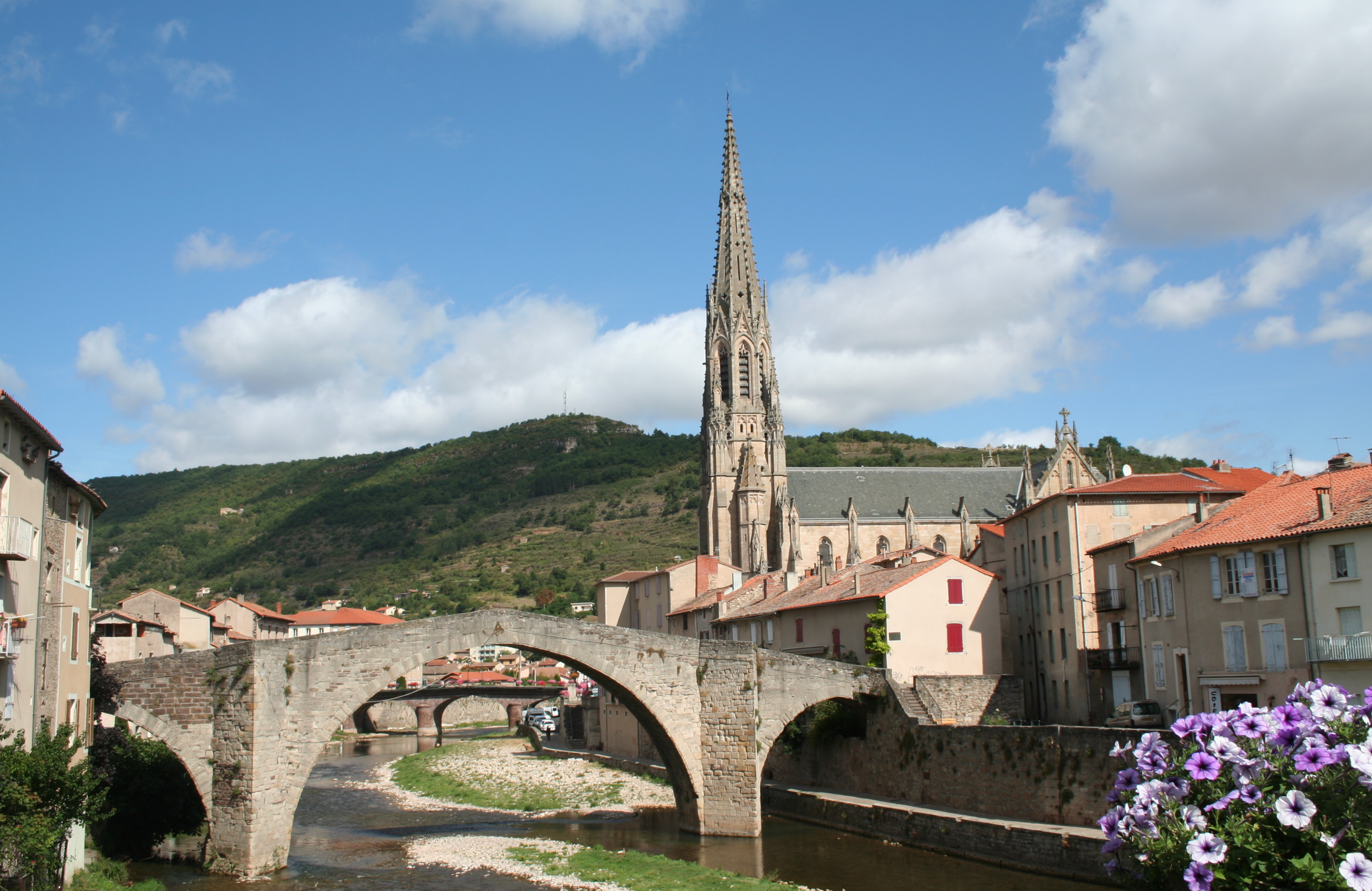
- The Sorgues at Saint-Affrique

- Location within France Location within Occitanie

Location
- Country: France

Physical characteristics
- Source
  - location: Cornus
  - coordinates: 43°52′34″N 03°12′22″E
  - elevation: 600 m (2,000 ft)
- Mouth: Dourdou de Camarès
  - coordinates: 43°57′20″N 02°50′12″E
  - elevation: 298 m (978 ft)
- Length: 46.4 km (28.8 mi)
- Basin size: 279 km^{2} (108 sq mi)
- Discharge
  - average: 4.38 m^{3}/s (155 cu ft/s)

Basin features
- Progression: Dourdou de Camarès→ Tarn→ Garonne→ Gironde estuary→ Atlantic Ocean

The Sorgue (French: la Sorgue, also called Sorgue, French pronunciation: [sɔʁg]; Occitan: Sòrga) is a 46.4-kilometre-long (28 13/16 mi) river in the Aveyron department in Southern France. Its source is a karstic spring at Fontaine de Valcluse, in Provence. See also “Sorgue.”

== Communes along its course ==
This list is ordered from source to mouth: Cornus, Fondamente, Marnhagues-et-Latour, Saint-Félix-de-Sorgues, Versols-et-Lapeyre, Saint-Affrique, Vabres-l'Abbaye
