= Lachin y Gair =

1807 poem by Lord Byron

1807 title page.

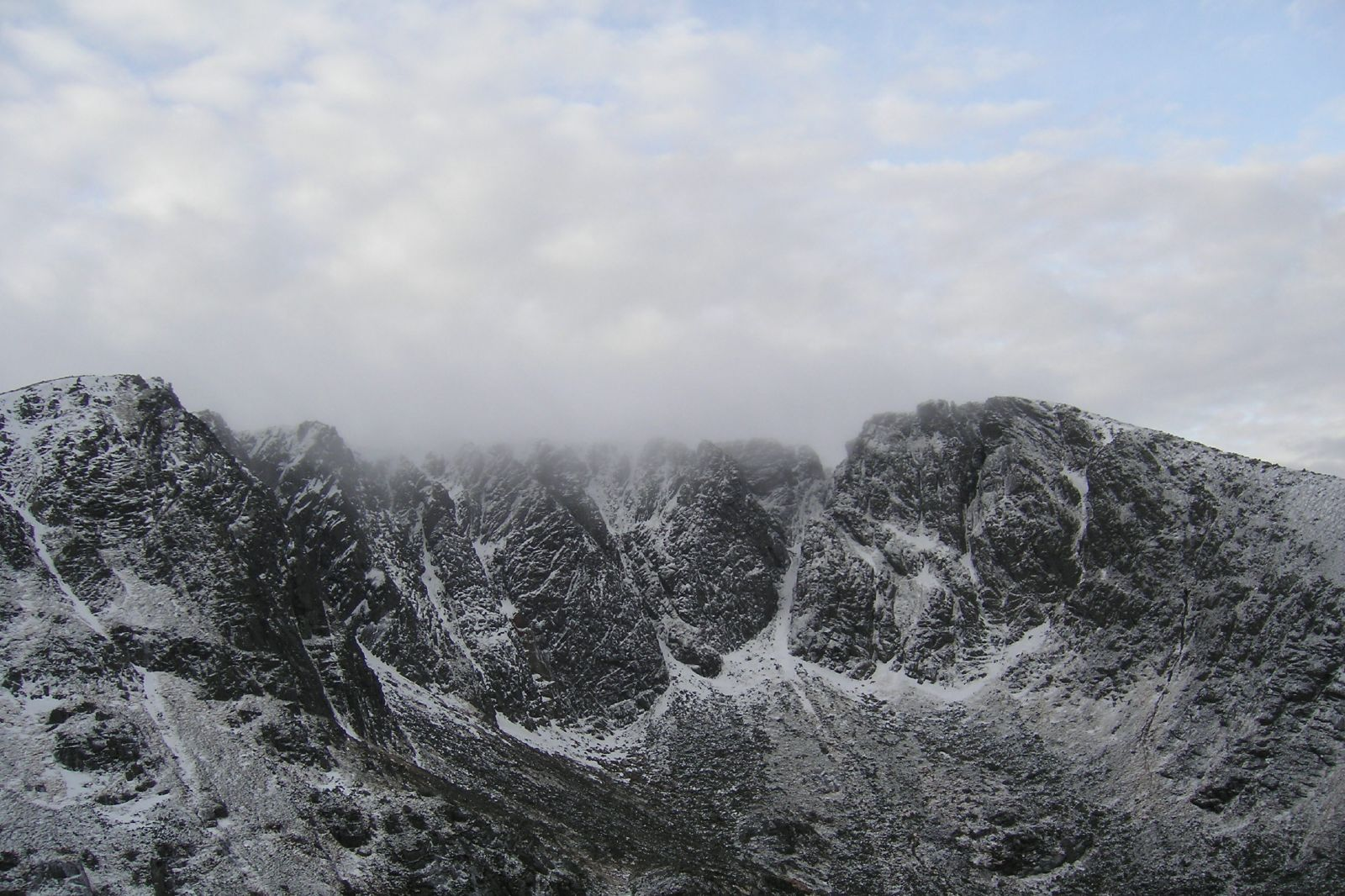
Lochnagar corrie in winter

"Lachin y Gair", often known as "Dark Lochnagar" or "Loch na Garr", is a poem by Lord Byron, written in 1807. It discusses the author's childhood in north east Scotland, when he used to visit Lochnagar in Highland Aberdeenshire. It is perhaps one of the poet's most Scottish works, both in theme and sentiment.

The poem was published in Hours of Idleness in 1807.

== Textual analysis ==
Lachin y Gair is essentially about childhood, ancestry (dualchas), and sense of place (duthchas) presented as Sehnsucht.

Byron begins with contrasting the gentrified landscapes of southern England with the harsher, colder East Highlands:

Away, ye gay landscapes, ye gardens of roses!
In you let the minions of luxury rove;
Restore me the rocks where the snow-flake reposes,
Though still they are sacred to freedom and love.
Yet, Caledonia, beloved are thy mountains,
Round their white summits though elements war;
Though cataracts foam 'stead of smooth-flowing fountains,
I sigh for the valley of dark Loch na Garr.

— lines 1-8

Then in the second stanza Byron refers to how his "young footsteps in infancy, wander'd" around the area, and how he would hear the "traditional story,/Disclos'd by the natives of dark Loch na Garr."

In the third and fourth stanzas, Byron mentions his Jacobite ancestors who haunt the area and who were "Ill starr'd, though brave, did no visions foreboding/Tell you that fate had forsaken your cause?/Ah! were you destined to die at Culloden" Byron himself says

I allude here to my maternal ancestors, "the Gordons," many of whom fought for the unfortunate Prince Charles, better known by the name of the Pretender. This branch was nearly allied by blood, as well as attachment, to the Stuarts. George, the second Earl of Huntley, married the Princess Annabella Stuart, daughter of James I. of Scotland. By her he left four sons: the third, Sir William Gordon, I have the honour to claim as one of my progenitors.

In the fifth stanza, Byron laments his exile from Scotland:

Years have roll'd on, Loch na Garr, since I left you,
Years must elapse ere I tread you again:
Nature of verdure and flow'rs has bereft you,
Yet still are you dearer than Albion's plain.
England! thy beauties are tame and domestic [...]

— lines 33-37

== Folk song ==
The work has been set to a tune attributed to Sir Henry Bishop, and remains a popular standard in Scottish folk music. A number of versions exist, but it was notably recorded by The Corries. Jimmy McDermid, father of Val McDermid also used to sing the song.

The Fiddler's Companion claims that the tune also travelled to Ireland:

Gearóid Ó hAllmhuráin believe this tune may have been learned in County Clare from Scottish sappers in the 1830s who were sent to the region as part of the British survey of the country.

As the Penguin Book of Scottish Verse says:

There are few major English poets who can be heard sung in peasant bothies among the more native fare, but Byron's Lachin A Gair is a popular favourite, and those sophisticated critics who sneer at the poem but don't know the tune should hear it sung by a farm-labourer's 'tenore robusto'.

Beethoven set the poem as "Lochnagar" (No. 9 in his 12 Scottish Folksongs WoO 156, published 1814–15) to a purportedly Scottish folk melody, but the tune was actually written by an Englishman called Maurice Greene (1696-1755), a composer of the late Baroque period.

== Lochnagar elsewhere in Byron ==
Byron also referred to Lochnagar in The Island:

The infant rapture still survived the boy,
And Loch-na-gar with Ida looked o'er Troy.

— The Island: Canto II, stanza XII, lines 290-291

== See also ==
- Early life of George Gordon Byron
