= Catherine Osborne, Duchess of Leeds =

British courtier

Her Grace The Duchess of Leeds
- Born: Catherine Anguish; 21 January 1764
- Died: 9 October 1837 (aged 73)
- Spouse: Francis Osborne, 5th Duke of Leeds
- Issue: Lord Sidney Godolphin Osborne; Lady Catherine Anne Sarah Osborne
- Father: Thomas Anguish, Esq.
- Mother: Sarah Henley
- Occupation: Governess of Princess Charlotte of Wales; Mistress of the Robes to Queen Adelaide

Catherine Osborne, Duchess of Leeds (21 January 1764 – 9 October 1837), formerly Catherine Anguish, was a British courtier. She was the second wife of Francis Osborne, 5th Duke of Leeds.

She was the daughter of Thomas Anguish, Esq., a lawyer from Great Yarmouth, whose son Thomas heir to the estates of Sir Thomas Allin, 4th Baronet, of Somerleyton. Her beauty was praised by Lord Sheffield in the "Auckland Correspondence".

She married Osborne in 1788, while he was still Marquess of Carmarthen. He had divorced his first wife, Amelia, in 1779. However, his son from his first marriage, George Osborne, would inherit the dukedom.

The duke and his second wife had two children:

- Lord Sidney Godolphin Osborne (1789-1861), who died unmarried. In 1843, following the death of both his mother's brothers, he inherited the Allin estates.
- Lady Catherine Anne Sarah Osborne (1791-1878), who married Major John Whyte-Melville, and had children, including George Whyte-Melville.

The duchess was fond of music and an accomplished singer, particularly known for her interpretations of works by Handel. She was a patron of the novelist Ann Radcliffe, who dedicated an edition of The Romance of the Forest to her.

In 1813, the duchess was appointed governess to Princess Charlotte of Wales, daughter of the Prince Regent and his wife, Caroline of Brunswick. It was claimed by Lady Charlotte Bury that Princess Charlotte despised the duchess. She was obliged to resign from her position, when the princess declined to marry the partner chosen for her, William, Prince of Orange.

Between 1830 and 1837, as Dowager Duchess, she was Mistress of the Robes to Adelaide of Saxe-Meiningen, queen consort of King William IV of the United Kingdom.

Court offices
Preceded by Elizabeth Thynne, Marchioness of Bath	Mistress of the Robes to Queen Adelaide; 1830–1837	Succeeded by Harriet Sutherland-Leveson-Gower, Duchess of Sutherland
