= Lochnagar =

Mountain in the Grampians, Scotland

- Beinn Chìochan
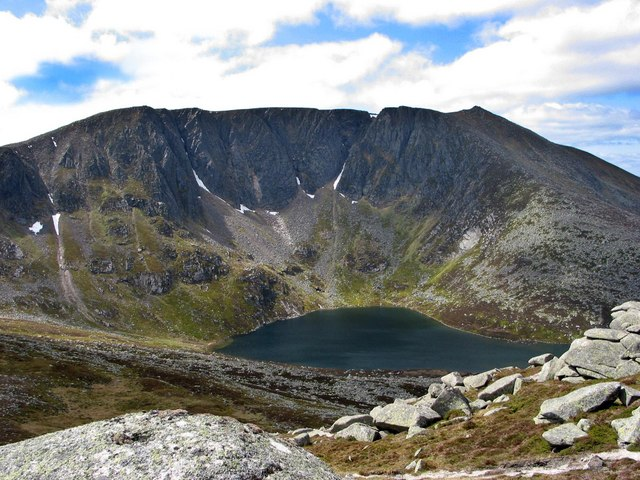
- Lochnagar summit and loch from Meikle Pap

Highest point
- Elevation: 1,155 m (3,789 ft)
- Prominence: 671 m (2,201 ft)
- Parent peak: Ben Avon
- Isolation: 19.21 km (11 mi 1,648 yd)
- Listing: Munro, Marilyn
- Coordinates: 56°57′17″N 3°14′25″W

Naming
- Native name: Beinn Chìochan (Scottish Gaelic)
- English translation: breast-shaped mountain
- Pronunciation: English: /ˌlɒxnəˈɡɑːr/ LOKH-nə-GAR; Scottish Gaelic: [peɲ ˈçiəxən]

Geography
- Location within Scotland
- Location: Aberdeenshire, Scotland
- Parent range: Grampian Mountains
- OS grid: NO244861
- Topo map: OS Landranger 44

Lochnagar or Beinn Chìochan is a mountain in the Mounth, in the Grampians of Scotland. It is about five miles (eight kilometres) south of the River Dee near Balmoral. It is a popular hill with hillwalkers, and is a noted venue for summer and winter climbing. At the foot of the mountain is a lochan, Lochan na Gaire, from which the mountain's name derives.

== Names ==
The English name refers to a mountain loch in the northeast corrie, Lochan na Gaire, the 'little loch of the noisy sound'. Beinn Chìochan or Beinn nan Cìochan, 'mountain of breasts' or 'breast-shaped mountain', is probably the original Gaelic name for the mountain.

The summit itself is Cac Càrn Beag, meaning 'small cairn of faeces' in Gaelic, or less euphemistically, 'little pile of shit'. Peter Drummond, former chairman of the Architectural Heritage Society of Scotland, has also suggested that cac is a corruption of cadha ('slope'), which would lend a translation of 'little cairn of the slope'.

== Geography ==
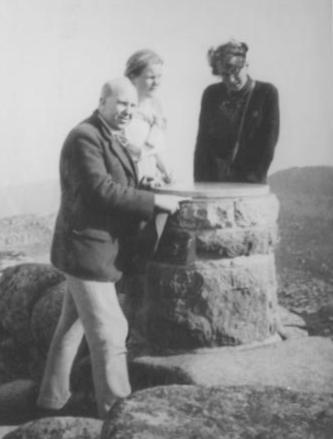
Scottish tourists on the summit in 1933

Lochnagar is located on the Royal Estate of Balmoral. Its principal feature is a north-facing corrie, around which most of the subsidiary tops, as well as the main peak, sit. The corrie is the location of many classic summer and winter climbing routes. The mountain is a Munro and is popular with hillwalkers at all times of the year, with the most common ascent route being from Glen Muick. Care should be taken on the summit in poor visibility: the plateau has few obvious features and has steep cliffs on its northern edge.

== Climate ==
Lochnagar's summit experiences an Alpine Tundra Climate, with freezing, snowy winters and cool summers. The nearest UK Met Office weather station is at Braemar 6 1/2 miles (10 kilometres) northwest. The yearly temperature range is usually between −6.6 and 9.4 °C (20.1 and 48.9 °F). January has the highest average frosts, despite February nights being colder; January has an average of 26.9 frost days, compared with 24.3 in February. There is the risk of a frost at any time of the year, even in July and August, when each month averages one air frost every 10 years.

== Nature and conservation ==
Lochanagar lies within the Cairngorms National Park, and also gives its name to Deeside and Lochnagar National Scenic Area, one of 40 such areas in Scotland. The designated national scenic area is 40,000 hectares (99,000 acres) in size, and covers the mountains surrounding Lochnagar as far south as the head of Glen Doll, as well Deeside to the north.

The mountain forms part of two designated Special Protection Areas, due to its importance for breeding dotterel (Charadrius morinellus) and golden eagles (Aquila chrysaetos).

== Cultural references ==
Due to its location on the Balmoral estate the mountain has many royal links, and Queen Victoria climbed to the summit in 1848. In the film Mrs. Brown, John Brown and Benjamin Disraeli hike up Lochnagar to discuss the need for the Queen to return to active involvement with government. It is also the setting for a children's story, The Old Man of Lochnagar, originally told by Prince Charles. In 2023, a recessional tune entitled The Call of Lochnagar was composed for the service at which Charles III was presented the Honours of Scotland.

The poet Lord Byron spent time in the area in his youth, and wrote the poem, Lachin y Gair (also known as Dark Lochnagar), which also forms the basis of a song which would eventually be composed by Beethoven.

England! thy beauties are tame and domestic,

To one who has rov'd on the mountains afar:
Oh! for the crags that are wild and majestic,

The steep, frowning glories of dark Loch na Garr

— Byron

A malt-whisky distillery located near the Balmoral estate on the south side of the River Dee produces the Royal Lochnagar Single Malt whisky.

The hill gives its name to one of the houses at Aboyne Academy.

== See also ==
- Ben Nevis
- Breast-shaped hill
- List of Munro mountains
- Lochnagar crater: The site of the largest single mine of World War I, exploded at the beginning of the Battle of the Somme. Dug from a communication trench named "Lochnagar Street".
- Mountains and hills of Scotland
