= Portrait of the Duke of Leeds =

1796 painting by Thomas Lawrence

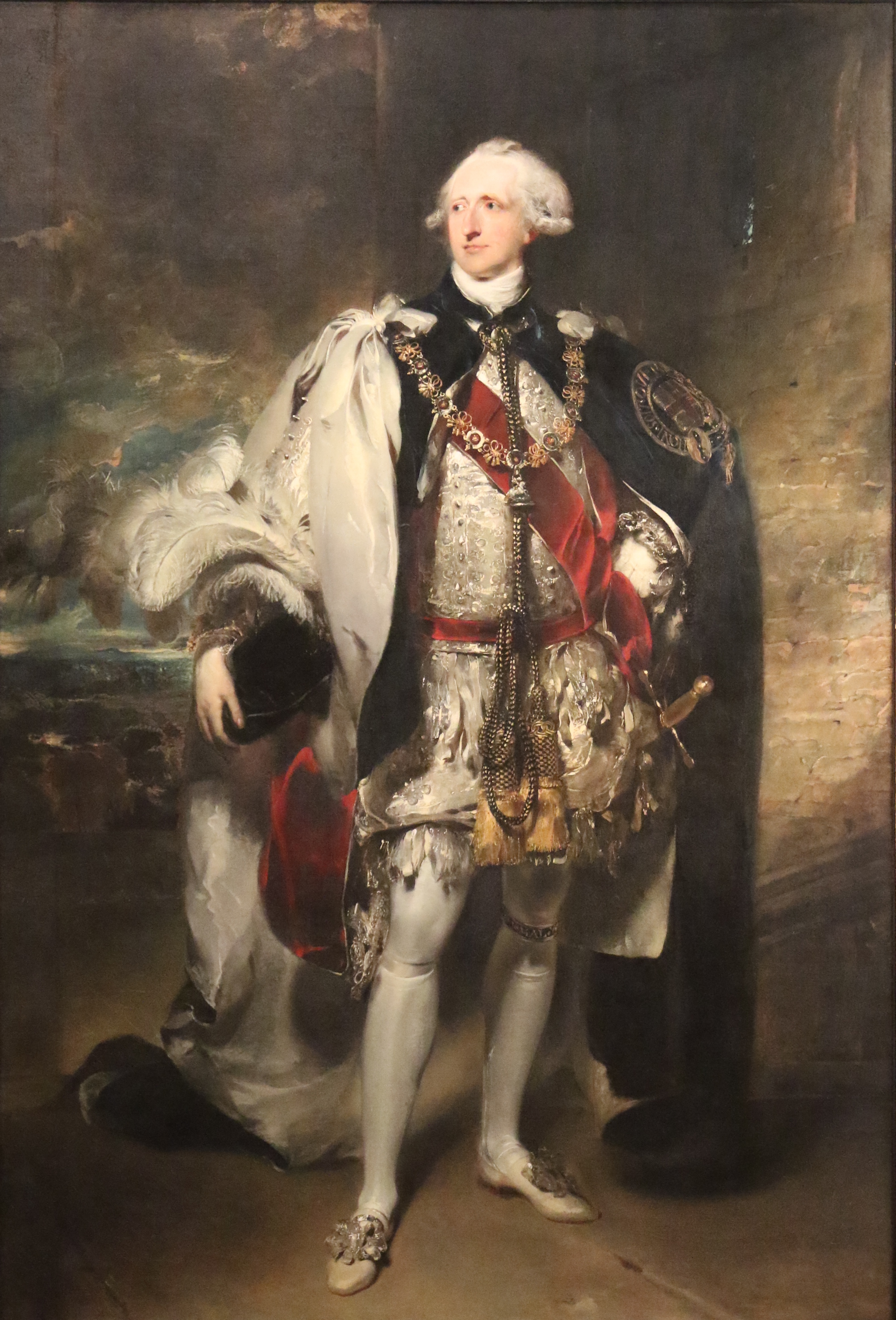
- Artist: Thomas Lawrence
- Year: 1796
- Type: Oil on canvas, portrait painting
- Dimensions: 220 cm × 142 cm (88 in × 55.9 in)
- Location: Ashmolean Museum, Oxford

Portrait of the Duke of Leeds is a 1796 portrait painting by the English artist Thomas Lawrence. It depicts the British politician Francis Osborne, 5th Duke of Leeds who served as foreign secretary between 1783 and 1791 in the government of Pitt the Younger.

== History and description ==
It was begun in 1791 shortly after the Duke was awarded the Order of the Garter after his resignation from the Foreign Office, but took several years to complete. The work was displayed at the Royal Academy's Summer Exhibition in 1796. It helped revive the career of the young Lawrence who had recently received poor reviews after his earlier, breakthrough successes. Lawrence went on to become the leading portrait painter of the Regency era and in 1820 was elected as President of the Royal Academy

The portrait shows the Duke of Leeds at full length, with his Yorkshire property Hornby Castle in the background. He is dressed in the robes of the Order of the Garter. Today the painting is in the collection of the Ashmolean Museum in Oxford having been acquired in 2014 through acceptance in lieu.

== Bibliography ==
- Levey, Michael. Sir Thomas Lawrence. ISBN 0300109989. Yale University Press, 2005.
- Neville, Peter. Historical Dictionary of British Foreign Policy. ISBN 0810871734. Scarecrow Press, 2013.
