= Versols-et-Lapeyre =

Commune in Occitanie, France

- Commune
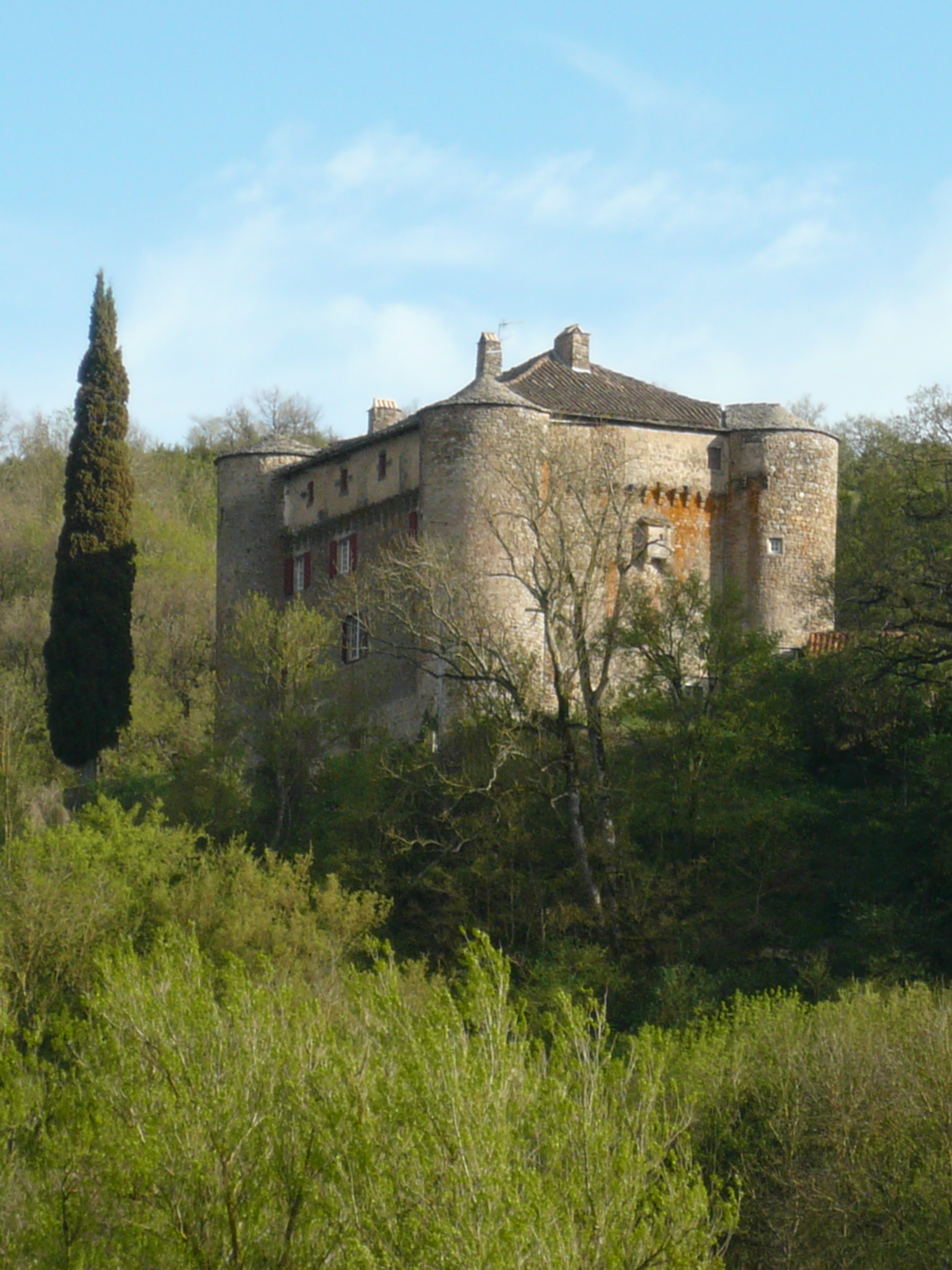
- Montalègre chateau
- Location of Versols-et-Lapeyre
- Location within France Location within Occitanie
- Coordinates: 43°54′N 2°57′E
- Country: France
- Region: Occitania
- Department: Aveyron
- Arrondissement: Millau
- Canton: Saint-Affrique
- Intercommunality: Saint Affricain, Roquefort, Sept Vallons

Government
  - Mayor (2020–2026): Marc Desoteux
- Area^{1}: 27.95 km^{2} (10.79 sq mi)
- Elevation: 380 m (1,250 ft)
- Highest elevation: 766 m (2,513 ft)
- Lowest elevation: 264 m (866 ft)
- Population (2023): 421
  - Density: 15.1/km^{2} (39.0/sq mi)
- Time zone: UTC+01:00 (CET)
  - Summer (DST): UTC+02:00 (CEST)
- INSEE/Postal code: 12292 /12400
- ^{1} French Land Register data, which excludes lakes, ponds, glaciers > 1 km^{2} (0.386 sq mi or 247 acres) and river estuaries.

Versols-et-Lapeyre (French pronunciation: [vɛʁsɔl e lapɛʁ]; Occitan: Verzòls e La Pèira) is a commune in the Aveyron department in southern France.

== Geography ==
The hamlets of Versols and Lapeyre lie on the right bank of the Sorgues, which flows northwest through the middle of the commune.

== Population ==
Historical population
Year	Pop.	±% p.a.
1968	310	—
1975	260	−2.48%
1982	307	+2.40%
1990	340	+1.28%
1999	353	+0.42%
2007	437	+2.70%
2012	458	+0.94%
2017	420	−1.72%
2023	421	+0.04%
Source: INSEE

== See also ==
- Communes of the Aveyron department
