= Amelia Byron, Baroness Conyers =

British peer and Portuguese countess

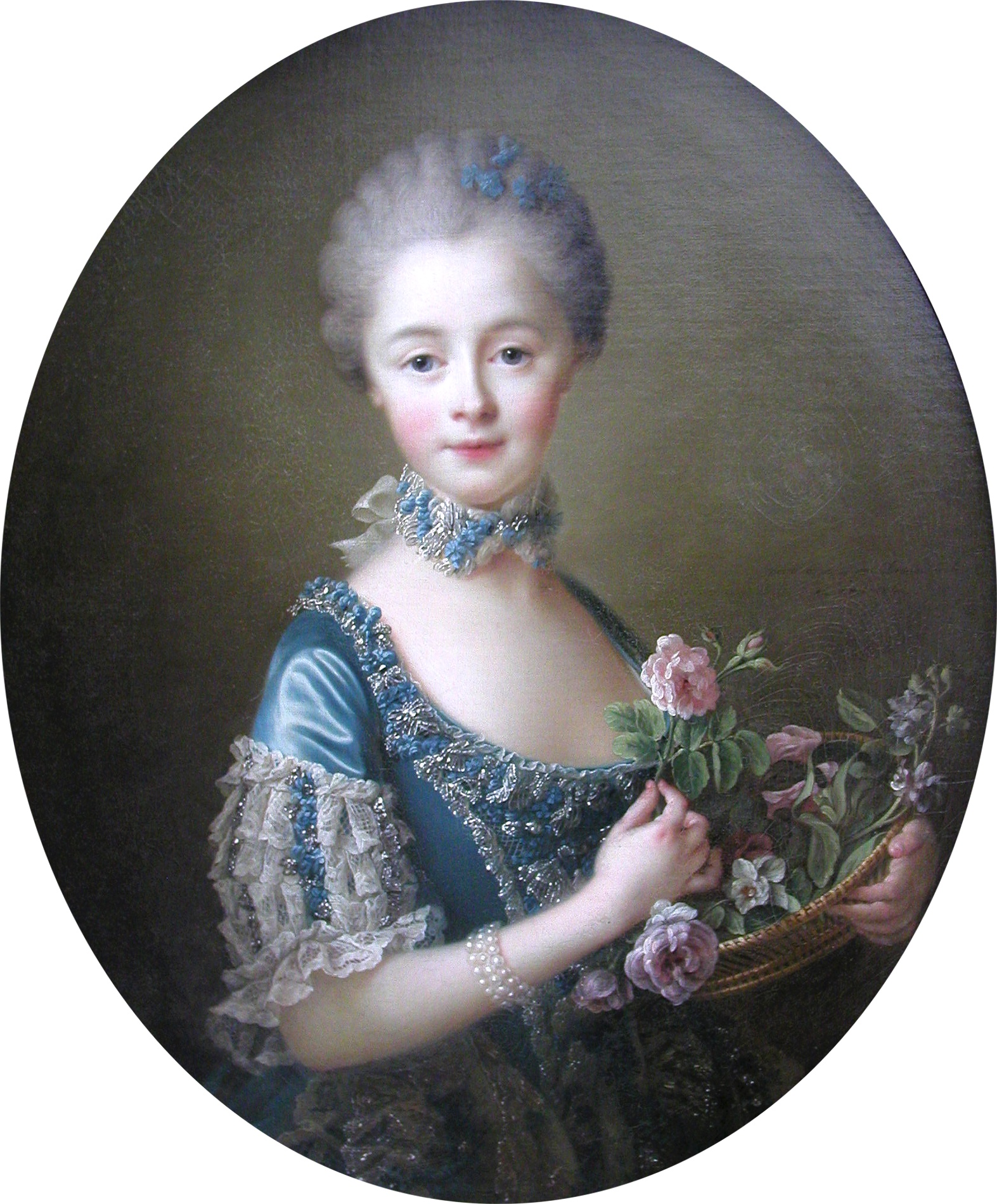
- Amelia Osborne, painted by François-Hubert Drouais
- Born: Lady Amelia d'Arcy; 12 October 1754
- Died: 27 January 1784 (aged 29); Mayfair, London
- Spouses: Francis, Marquess of Carmarthen (m. 1773; div. 1779) John "Mad Jack" Byron (m. 1779–1784)
- Children: The 6th Duke of Leeds; Mary, Countess of Chichester; The 1st Baron Godolphin; Hon. Augusta Leigh
- Parent(s): The 4th Earl of Holderness; Mary Doublet

Amelia Byron, Baroness Conyers, 12th Baroness Darcy de Knayth, 9th Baroness Conyers, 5th Countess of Mértola (née Lady Amelia Darcy; 12 October 1754 – 27 January 1784), known as the Marchioness of Carmarthen from 1773–9, was a British peer and a Portuguese countess. She is best known for eloping with John "Mad Jack" Byron, father of Lord Byron.

== Early life ==
Lady Amelia was the only surviving child of the 4th Earl of Holderness and his wife, the former Mary Doublet. Her portrait was painted in about 1764 by François-Hubert Drouais.

== Marriage to Marquess of Carmarthen ==
On 29 November 1773, Lady Amelia married Francis, Marquess of Carmarthen, in London, and they had three children:

- Lord George William Frederick Osborne (21 July 1775 – 10 July 1838), later 6th Duke of Leeds; married Lady Charlotte Townshend, daughter of the 1st Marquess Townshend, on 17 August 1797 and had issue.
- Lady Mary Henrietta Juliana Osborne (7 September 1776 – 21 October 1862); married the 2nd Earl of Chichester (28 April 1756 – 4 July 1826) in 1801 and had issue.
- Lord Francis Godolphin Osborne (18 October 1777 – 15 February 1850), later 1st Baron Godolphin; married The Hon. Elizabeth Eden, third daughter of the 1st Baron Auckland, on 31 March 1800 and had issue.

In early 1777, Lady Amelia's mother, Lady Holderness, broke off relations with her daughter after the Carmarthens gave shelter to Richard Glover (son of the poet), a friend of Lord Carmarthen, when he eloped with one of the daughters of Solomon Dayrolles.

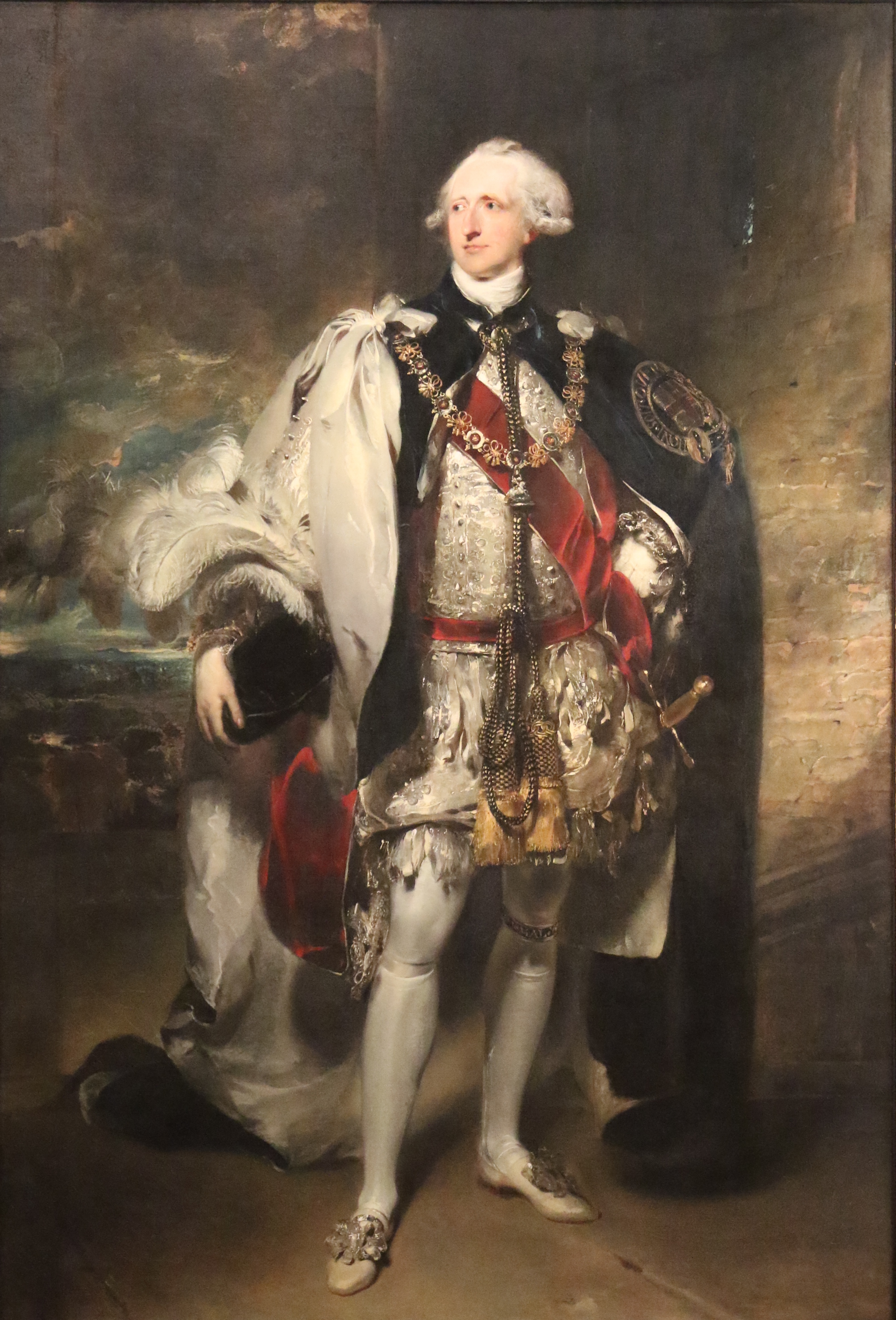
Portrait of the Duke of Leeds by Thomas Lawrence. Her marriage to her first husband ended when she eloped with Captain Jack Byron

On 16 May 1778, as the only surviving child of her father, Lady Amelia succeeded de jure to the titles of 12th Baroness Darcy de Knayth and 9th Baroness Conyers in her own right, and to the Portuguese countship of Mértola. Her right to the baronies of Darcy de Knayth and Conyers was eventually confirmed in 1798, long after her death.

== Affair with "Mad Jack" Byron ==
In December 1778, Lady Carmarthen's marriage ended when she ran off with Captain John "Mad Jack" Byron. The previous month, Byron visited her at home in Grosvenor Square when her husband was absent, and they began an affair. Lord and Lady Carmarthen were divorced on 31 May 1779. Almost immediately after the divorce, Lady Conyers, as she was styled, married Byron. They had three children:

- Hon. Sophia Georgina Byron (18 July 1779 – died aged two months; buried at Twickenham on 18 September 1779).
- Unnamed son (died at birth, ca. 1780/81).
- Hon. Augusta Maria Byron (26 January 1783 – 12 October 1851).

== Death ==
A year after the birth of the last child, Lady Conyers died following a lingering illness at her home at Upper Brook Street, Mayfair. Her titles were inherited by her eldest son, George. By his second wife, her widower became the father of the poet, Lord Byron.

Portuguese nobility
Preceded by Robert Darcy	Countess of Mértola; 1778–1784	Succeeded by George Osborne
Peerage of England
Preceded by Robert Darcy	Baroness Darcy de Knayth; 1778–1784	Succeeded by George Osborne
Preceded by Robert Darcy	Baroness Conyers; 1778–1784	Succeeded by George Osborne
