= John Byron (British Army officer) =

British Army officer and writer

Captain John Byron
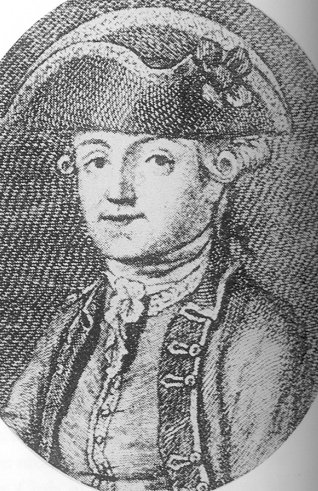
- Lord Byron's father, Captain John "Mad Jack" Byron
- Born: 1757
- Died: 2 August 1791 (aged 34); Valenciennes
- Other name: Mad Jack
- Education: Westminster School
- Spouses: Amelia Osborne, Marchioness of Carmarthen (m. 1779; died 1784) Catherine Gordon (m. 1785)
- Children: Augusta Leigh; The 6th Baron Byron
- Parent(s): Vice-Admiral The Hon. John Byron; Sophia Trevanion
- Relatives: The 4th Baron Byron (paternal grandfather)
- Military career
- Allegiance: Kingdom of Great Britain
- Branch: British Army
- Rank: Captain

Captain John Byron (1757 – 2 August 1791) was a British Army officer and letter writer, best known as the father of the poet Lord Byron. In 1824, an obituary of his son gave him the nickname "Mad Jack Byron", and though there is no evidence for this in his own lifetime, it has since stuck – certainly he was called "Jack" by his family members and referred to himself as such.

== Early life ==
Byron was the sixth child and eldest son of Vice-Admiral Hon. John Byron and Sophia Trevanion and grandson of William Byron, 4th Baron Byron of Rochdale. The earliest record of him is his baptism record, dated 17 March 1757 in Plymouth.

After his family moved to London he was educated at Westminster School.

He gained the rank of captain in the Coldstream Guards and was dispatched with his regiment to Philadelphia, where he managed to accrue considerable debts during the American Revolution.

== Marriages ==
In 1778, Jack became embroiled in an affair with the married Amelia Osborne, Marchioness of Carmarthen, daughter of Robert Darcy, 4th Earl of Holderness. Shortly before Christmas they ran away to Rottingdean, where they were discovered in bed together by one of her husband's servants. Her husband, Francis Osborne, later 5th Duke of Leeds, petitioned for divorce on the grounds of adultery in 1779. Byron married Amelia in London on 9 June 1779 and they went on to have three children: Sophia Georgina Byron, an unnamed boy, and Augusta Maria Byron. Sophia and the unnamed boy died in infancy; Augusta Byron went on to marry George Leigh. Amelia died in London in 1784.

Byron then married Catherine Gordon, heiress of Gight in Aberdeenshire, Scotland, daughter of George Gordon of Gight and Catherine Innes, on 17 May 1785. In order to claim his wife's estate in Scotland, Captain Byron took the surname Gordon. They had one child, born on 22 January 1788: George Gordon Byron, 6th Baron Byron.

Having attempted to live with his wife in Aberdeen and squandered her fortune, Jack eventually left both his wife and son in Scotland and went to France to live with his sister, Frances Leigh (1749-1823). Having never managed to take control of his spending, Jack continued to attend parties and theatre trips and engage courtesans, and subsequently died in August 1791 at Valenciennes, while still in his mid-thirties.

Though his son Lord Byron claimed many years later that his father had cut his own throat, there is no contemporary evidence to support this. The fact that Jack mentioned coughing up blood and losing weight, and that his sister Sophy described his "long and suffering illness" supports the idea that he died from a consumptive illness such as tuberculosis.

Had he survived, Jack would have been next in line to inherit his uncle's title as Lord Byron. Instead, it fell to his ten-year-old son George in 1798.

== Bibliography ==
- Michael Bakewell and Melissa Bakewell, Augusta Leigh: Byron's Half-Sister (2000)
- Emily Brand, The Fall of the House of Byron (John Murray, 2020)
- Violet Walker, The House of Byron (Quiller Press, 1988)
