= Augusta Leigh =

Half-sister of Lord Byron (1783–1851)

The Honourable Augusta Leigh
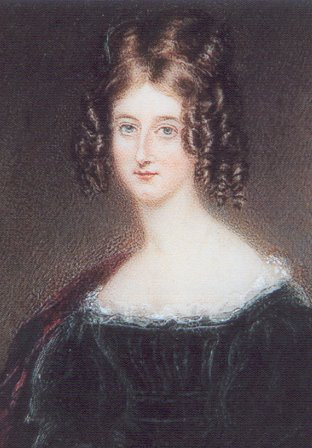
- Augusta Maria Leigh
- Born: Hon. Augusta Maria Byron; 26 January 1783
- Died: 12 October 1851 (aged 68)
- Spouse: Lt.-Colonel George Leigh
- Children: Elizabeth Medora Leigh
- Parent(s): John "Mad Jack" Byron; Amelia Osborne, Marchioness of Carmarthen
- Relatives: Lord Byron (paternal half-brother)

Augusta Maria Leigh (née Byron; 26 January 1783 – 12 October 1851) was the only surviving daughter of John "Mad Jack" Byron, the poet Lord Byron's father, by his first wife, Amelia, née Darcy (Lady Conyers in her own right and the divorced wife of Francis, Marquis of Carmarthen).

== Early life ==
Augusta's mother died soon after giving birth. Her grandmother, Lady Holderness, raised Augusta for a few years, but died when Augusta was still a young girl, and the child divided her time among relatives and friends.

== Marriage ==
Augusta later married her cousin, Lt. Colonel George Leigh (1771–1850), son of General Charles Leigh (1748–1815) and his wife, Frances Byron (1749–1823), her paternal aunt. The couple had seven children: Georgiana Augusta, Augusta Charlotte, George Henry, Elizabeth Medora, Frederick George, Amelia Marianne, and Henry Francis. Richard Temple-Nugent-Brydges-Chandos-Grenville, 1st Duke of Buckingham and Chandos, noted the wedding with disdain in his diary: "Poor Augusta Leigh marries today! Poor thing! I pity her connecting herself with such a Family and such a fool! However, she has nobody to blame but herself." The marriage turned out unhappily because he fell into a dissolute way of life and gambled away all his money. In the end, he left his wife and children nothing but debts.

== Lord Byron ==
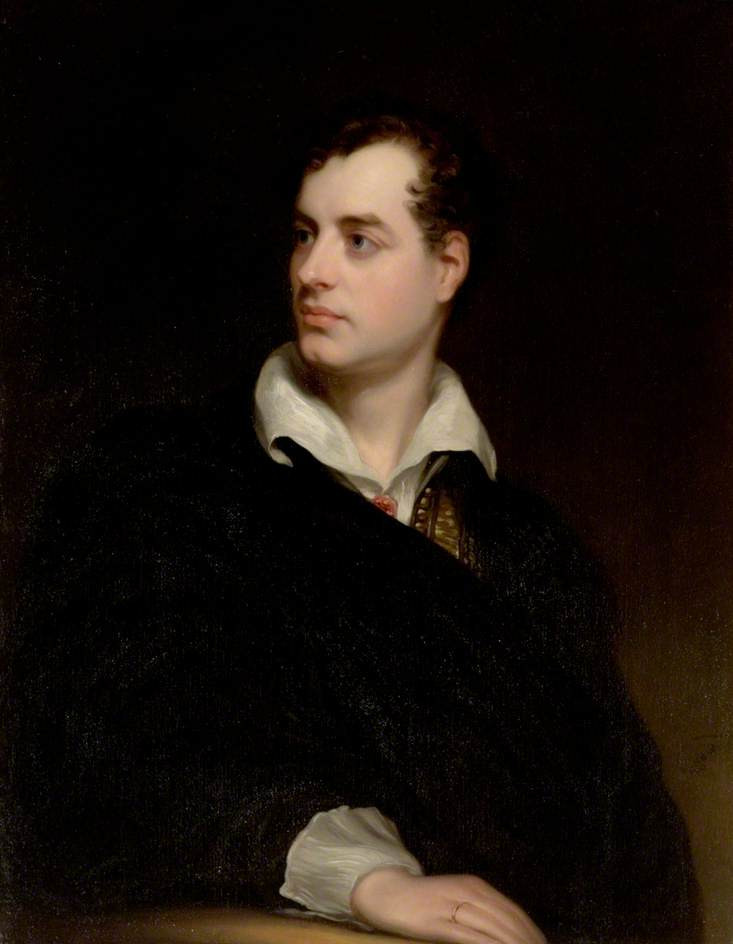
Portrait of Lord Byron by Thomas Phillips, c. 1814

Augusta's half-brother, George Lord Byron, did not meet her until he went to Harrow School, and even then only very rarely. From 1804 onward, however, she wrote to him regularly and became his confidante, especially in his quarrels with his mother. Their correspondence ceased for two years after Byron had gone abroad, and was not resumed until she sent him a letter expressing her sympathy on the death of his mother, Catherine, in 1811.

Not having been brought up together, they were almost like strangers to each other. But they got on well together and appear to have fallen in love with each other. When Byron's marriage collapsed and he sailed away from England never to return, rumours of incest were rife.

There is some evidence to support the incest accusation. Augusta Leigh's third daughter, born in spring of 1814, was christened Elizabeth Medora Leigh. A few days after the birth, Byron went to his sister's house Swynford Paddocks in Cambridgeshire to see the child, and wrote, in a letter to his confidante, Lady Melbourne: "Oh! but it is 'worth while', I can't tell you why, and it is not an "Ape", and if it is, that must be my fault; however, I will positively reform. You must however allow that it is utterly impossible I can ever be half so well liked else-where, and I have been all my life trying to make someone love me and never got the sort I preferred before."

== Later life ==
One of Augusta's daughters, Georgiana, married a cousin, Henry Trevanion in 1826, apparently at her mother's instigation. They had three daughters. Trevanion, who may also have had a relationship with Augusta herself, left Georgiana in 1829–30 for her younger sister Elizabeth Medora, who had been staying with them; Medora and Trevanion lived together for several years in France, before finally separating in the 1840s, Medora going on to marry a French soldier.

== Poetic references ==
Augusta is also the subject of Byron's Epistle to Augusta (1816) and Stanzas to Augusta.

== See also ==
- Margaret de Valois
- Marguerite de Ravalet
