= Francis Osborne, 5th Duke of Leeds =

British politician (1751–1799)

His Grace The Duke of Leeds KG PC
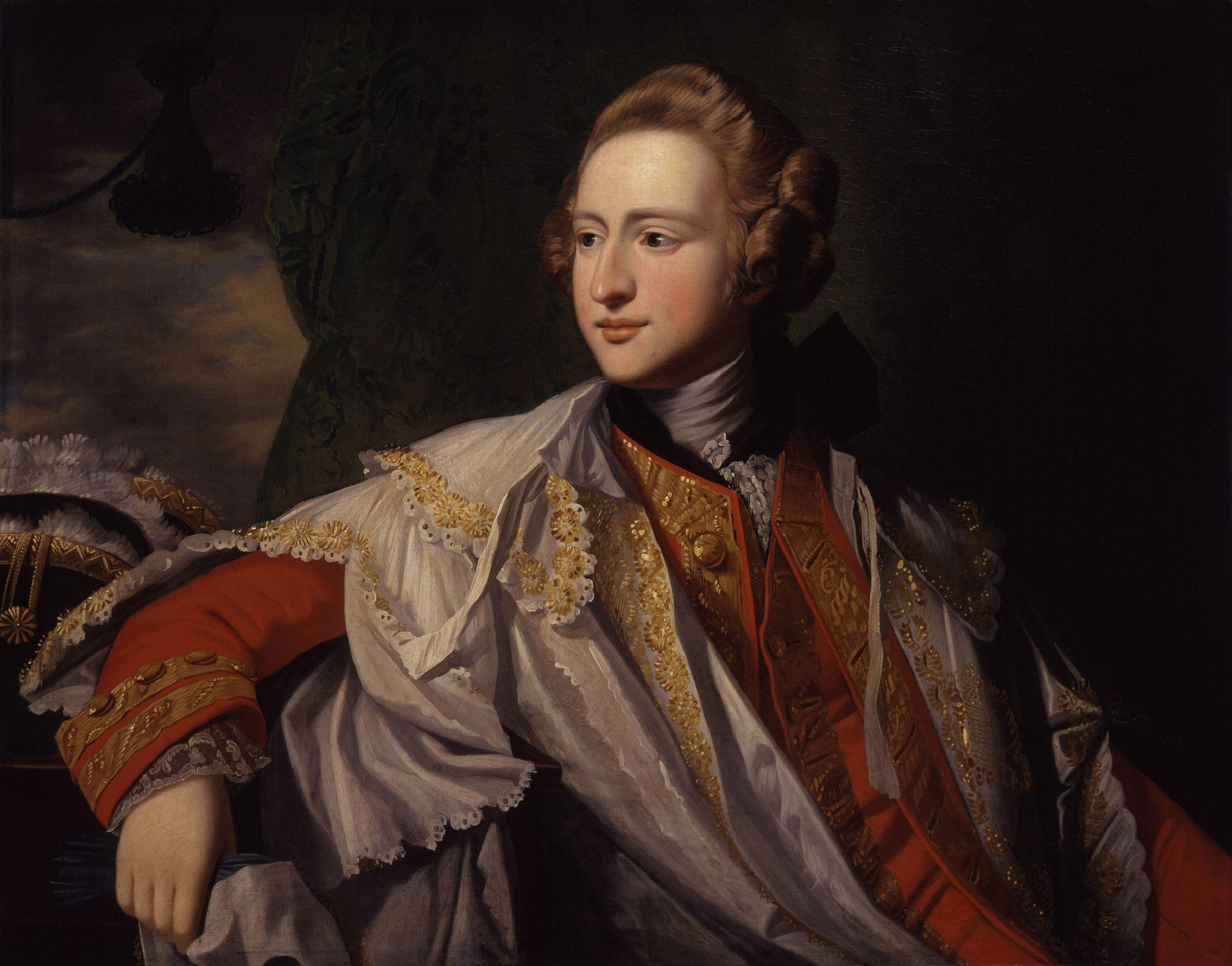
- c. 1769 portrait of Leeds by Benjamin West

Secretary of State for Foreign Affairs
- In office 23 December 1783 – May 1791
- Monarch: George III
- Prime Minister: The Right Hon. William Pitt
- Preceded by: The Earl Temple
- Succeeded by: The Lord Grenville

Leader of the House of Lords
- In office 1789–1790
- Preceded by: The Lord Sydney
- Succeeded by: The Lord Grenville

Personal details
- Born: 29 January 1751
- Died: 31 January 1799 (aged 48) London, England, Great Britain
- Resting place: All Hallows Church, Harthill, South Yorkshire
- Party: Tory
- Spouses: Lady Amelia Darcy (m. 1773; div. 1779) Catherine Anguish (m. 1788)
- Children: George Osborne, 6th Duke of Leeds; Mary Pelham, Countess of Chichester; Francis Osborne, 1st Baron Godolphin; Lord Sidney Osborne; Lady Catherine Whyte-Melville
- Parent(s): Thomas Osborne, 4th Duke of Leeds; Lady Mary Godolphin
- Education: Christ Church, Oxford

Francis Godolphin Osborne, 5th Duke of Leeds, KG, PC (29 January 1751 – 31 January 1799), styled Marquess of Carmarthen until 1789, was a British politician. He notably served as Foreign Secretary under William Pitt the Younger from 1783 to 1791. He also was Governor of Scilly. In 1790, he was made a Knight of the Order of the Garter. As a statesman, he is generally regarded as a failure, and his deep hostility to the newly independent United States damaged relations between the two countries.

== Background and education ==
Carmarthen was the only surviving son of Thomas Osborne, 4th Duke of Leeds, by his wife, Lady Mary, daughter of Francis Godolphin, 2nd Earl of Godolphin, and Henrietta Godolphin, 2nd Duchess of Marlborough. He was educated at Westminster School and at Christ Church, Oxford.

== Political career ==
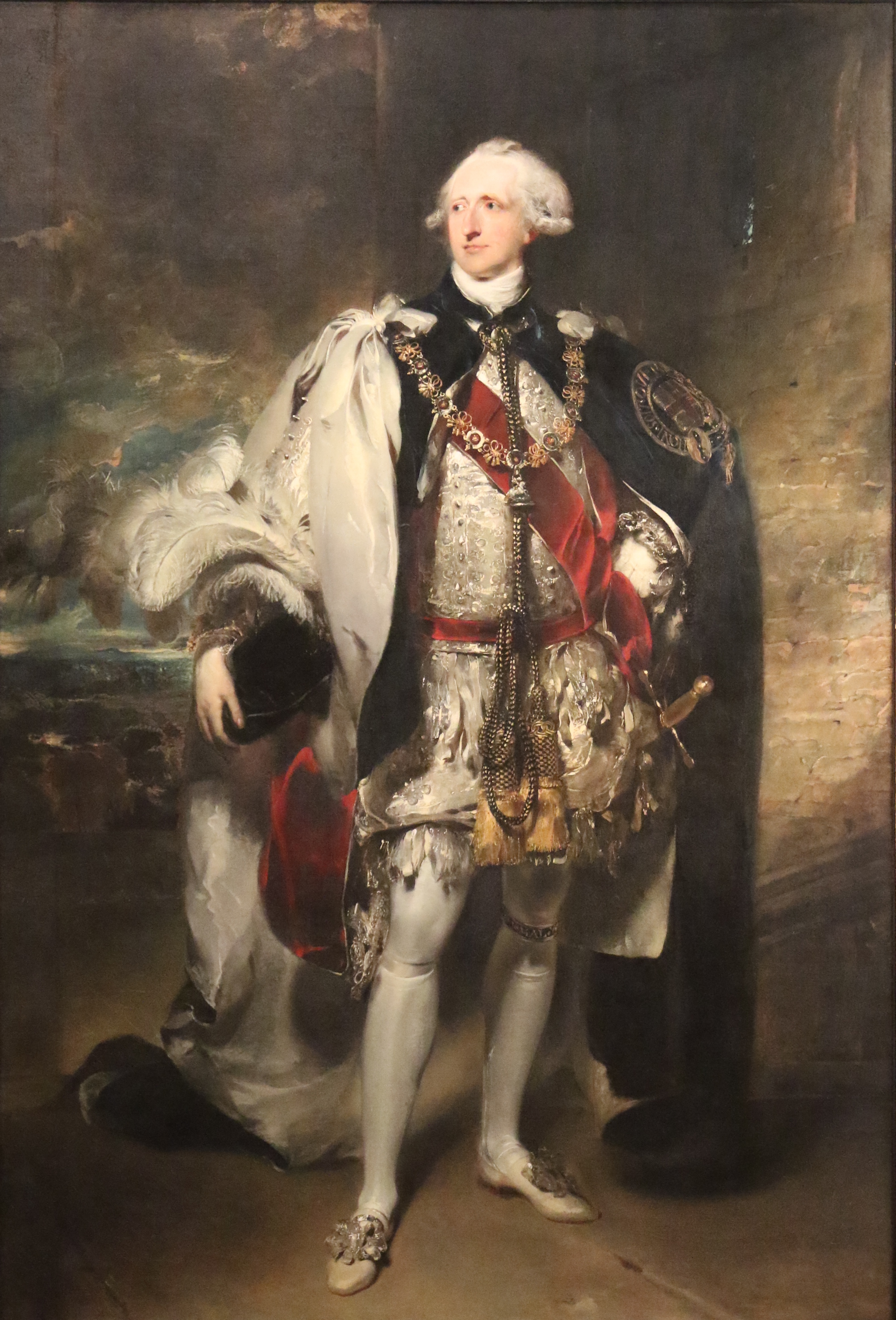
Portrait of the Duke of Leeds by Thomas Lawrence, 1796

Carmarthen was a member of parliament for Eye in 1774 and for Helston from 1774 to 1775; in 1776 having received a writ of acceleration as Baron Osborne, he entered the House of Lords, and in 1777 Lord Chamberlain of the Queen's Household and Captain of Deal Castle. In the House of Lords he was prominent as a determined foe of the prime minister, Lord North, who, after he had resigned his position as chamberlain, deprived him of the office of Lord Lieutenant of the East Riding of Yorkshire in 1780. He regained this, however, two years later.

Early in 1783, Carmarthen was selected as ambassador to France, but he did not take up this appointment, becoming instead Secretary of State for Foreign Affairs under William Pitt the Younger in December of the same year. Historian Jeremy Black says that in terms of foreign policy, Pitt and other leaders were disappointed with his performance as a minister. The Duke of Leeds, as he became upon his father's death in 1789, was anti-French but did not develop an active and aggressive foreign policy. Instead, King George III himself set the main lines of foreign policy before he became mentally disabled. Pitt's rejection of Leeds' anti-Russian policy was the final blow and he left office in April 1791.

Leeds, who was hostile to the newly independent United States, did nothing to foster good Anglo-American relations: two future U.S. Presidents, John Adams and Thomas Jefferson, who both served as the American ambassadors to Britain, complained about Leeds' obstructive attitude and "aversion to having anything to do with us". While Adams, who was somewhat of an Anglophile by inclination, was prepared to forgive and forget, Jefferson was not, and it can be argued that Leeds' only lasting achievement was to foster Jefferson's implacable hostility as President to the British government.

Subsequently, Leeds took little part in politics: in 1792, hearing rumours that a new coalition might be formed, he unwisely offered himself as its head and met with a firm rebuff from both Pitt and the King.

== Family ==
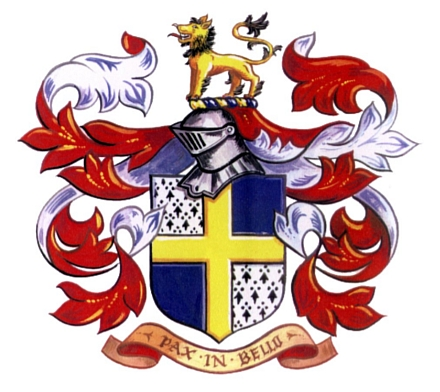
Ancestral arms of the Osborne family, Dukes of Leeds

Leeds married firstly in 1773 Lady Amelia Darcy, daughter of Robert Darcy, 4th Earl of Holderness on 29 November 1773. Lady Amelia became Baroness Darcy de Knayth and Baroness Conyers in her own right in 1778. They were divorced in 1779. Their marriage produced three children:

- George William Frederick Osborne, Marquess of Carmarthen (21 July 1775 – 10 July 1838), later 6th Duke of Leeds; married Lady Charlotte Townshend, daughter of the 1st Marquess Townshend, on 17 August 1797 and had issue.
- Lady Mary Henrietta Juliana Osborne (7 September 1776 – 21 October 1862); married Thomas Pelham, 2nd Earl of Chichester (28 April 1756 – 4 July 1826) in 1801 and had issue.
- Lord Francis Osborne (18 October 1777 – 15 February 1850), later 1st Baron Godolphin; married The Hon. Elizabeth Eden, third daughter of the 1st Baron Auckland, on 31 March 1800 and had issue.

He married secondly Catherine, daughter of Thomas Anguish, in 1788 and had two more children:

- Lord Sidney Godolphin Osborne (1789–1861); unmarried.
- Lady Catherine Anne Sarah Osborne (1791–1878); married Major John Whyte-Melville on 1 June 1819 and had issue.

Leeds died in London in January 1799, aged 48, and was buried in the Osborne family chapel at All Hallows Church, Harthill, South Yorkshire. He was succeeded in the dukedom by his eldest son from his first marriage, George Osborne, 6th Duke of Leeds. His second son from his first marriage, Lord Francis Osborne, was created Baron Godolphin in 1832. The dowager Duchess of Leeds died in October 1837, aged 73. Leeds's Political Memoranda were edited by Oscar Browning for the Camden Society in 1884, and there are eight volumes of his official correspondence in the British Museum.

Parliament of Great Britain
Preceded by Richard Burton Phillipson; William Cornwallis	Member of Parliament for Eye; 1774; With: Richard Burton Phillipson	Succeeded by Richard Burton Phillipson; John St John
Preceded by William Evelyn; The Earl of Clanbrassil	Member of Parliament for Helston; 1774–1775; With: Francis Owen	Succeeded by Francis Cockayne Cust; Philip Yorke
Court offices
Preceded by The Earl De La Warr	Lord Chamberlain to The Queen; 1777–1780	Succeeded by The Earl of Ailesbury
Political offices
Preceded by The Earl Temple	Foreign Secretary; 1783–1791	Succeeded by The Lord Grenville
Preceded by The Lord Sydney	Leader of the House of Lords; 1789–1790	Succeeded by The Lord Grenville
Honorary titles
Vacant Title last held by The Viscount of Irvine	Lord Lieutenant of the East Riding of Yorkshire; 1778–1780	Succeeded by The Earl of Carlisle
Preceded by The Earl of Carlisle	Lord Lieutenant of the East Riding of Yorkshire; 1782–1799	Succeeded by The Earl of Carlisle
Vacant Title last held by The Marquess of Rockingham	Vice-Admiral of Yorkshire; 1795–1799	Vacant Title next held by The Lord Mulgrave
Preceded by The Lord Godolphin	Governor of the Isles of Scilly; 1785−1799	Succeeded by The Duke of Leeds
Peerage of England
Preceded by Thomas Osborne	Duke of Leeds; 1789–1799	Succeeded by George Osborne
Preceded by Thomas Osborne	Baron Osborne (writ in acceleration); 1776–1799	Succeeded by George Osborne
