= Roquefort-sur-Soulzon =

Commune in Occitania, France

- Commune
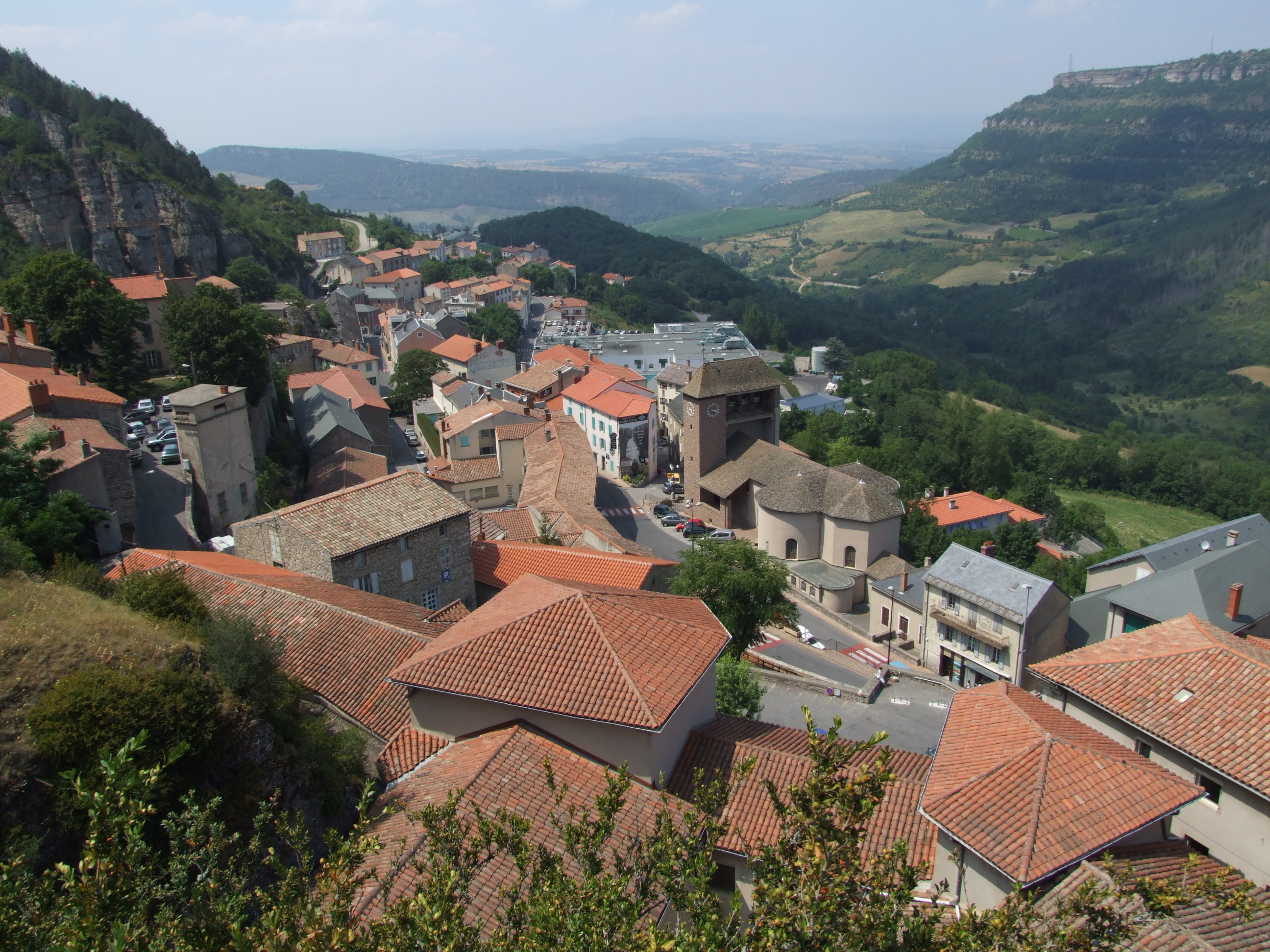
- A general view of Roquefort-sur-Soulzon

- Coat of arms
- Location of Roquefort-sur-Soulzon
- Location within France Location within Occitanie
- Coordinates: 43.974912°N 2.991993°E
- Country: France
- Region: Occitania
- Department: Aveyron
- Arrondissement: Millau
- Canton: Saint-Affrique
- Intercommunality: Saint Affricain, Roquefort, Sept Vallons

Government
  - Mayor (2026–32): Yannick Rouquette
- Area^{1}: 17.03 km^{2} (6.58 sq mi)
- Highest elevation: 828 m (2,717 ft)
- Lowest elevation: 424 m (1,391 ft)
- Population (2023): 475
  - Density: 27.9/km^{2} (72.2/sq mi)
- Time zone: UTC+01:00 (CET)
  - Summer (DST): UTC+02:00 (CEST)
- INSEE/Postal code: 12203 /12250
- ^{1} French Land Register data, which excludes lakes, ponds, glaciers > 1 km^{2} (0.386 sq mi or 247 acres) and river estuaries.

Roquefort-sur-Soulzon (French pronunciation: [ʁɔkfɔʁ syʁ sulzɔ̃]; Occitan: Ròcafòrt de Solson or Ròcafòrt [rɔkaˈfɔɾt]) is a commune in the department of Aveyron, and the region of Occitania, southern France. It is known for Roquefort cheese, a sheep's-milk cheese that takes its name from the commune.

The commune forms part of the former province of Rouergue, whose vernacular language before French became dominant was a form of Occitan known as Rouergat.

== Geography ==
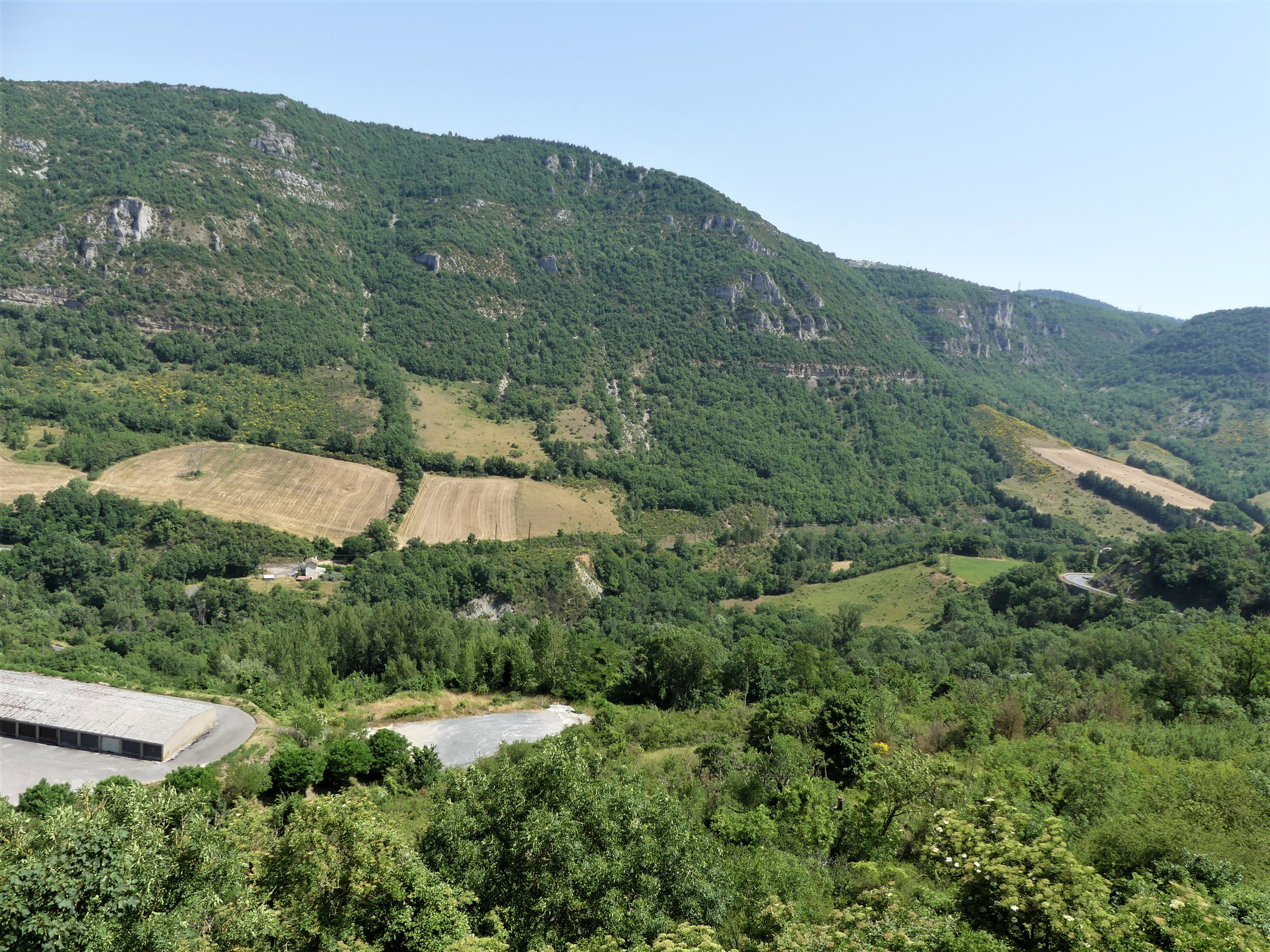
The Soulzon valley seen from the village, looking north-east.

Roquefort-sur-Soulzon lies in the south-eastern part of the Aveyron department, within the Grands Causses Regional Natural Park. The commune covers 17.03 km^{2} (6.58 sq mi) and occupies part of the foothills of the Causse du Larzac, on the southern edge of the Massif Central.

The Soulzon crosses the commune from north-east to north-west for nearly 5 km (3.1 mi) and also forms part of its north-western boundary for about 2 km (1.2 mi). The commune is also drained by several tributaries of the Soulzon and, in the south, by tributaries of the Sorgues and their own tributaries, including the Massergues, Pradeilles, Saint-Jean and Vailhauzy streams.

The lowest point of the commune, 424 m (1,391 ft), is in the far north, where the Soulzon leaves the commune and enters Saint-Rome-de-Cernon. The highest point, 828 m (2,717 ft), is in the north-east, on the boundary with Saint-Rome-de-Cernon, on the heights above the right bank of the Soulzon.

The village of Roquefort-sur-Soulzon stands at the junction of departmental roads D23 and D53. In a straight line, it is about 8.5 km (5.3 mi) east-north-east of Saint-Affrique. It overlooks the narrow Soulzon valley and is backed by the northern flank of the Combalou. Natural caves were formed there by the collapse of the limestone plateau on the edge of the Grands Causses. Over a distance of only 2 km (1.2 mi), a system of fissures gave rise to caves and cracks known as fleurines, which still provide the natural ventilation of the cellars cut into the rock. These are the Roquefort caves, where Roquefort cheese is matured.

The commune is also served by departmental roads D293 and D999.

=== Neighbouring communes ===
Roquefort-sur-Soulzon borders five other communes: Saint-Rome-de-Cernon to the north, Tournemire to the east, Saint-Jean-et-Saint-Paul to the south-east, Saint-Jean-d'Alcapiès to the south and Saint-Affrique to the west.

=== Climate ===
Several climate classifications have been applied to the commune. In 2010, according to a study by the French National Centre for Scientific Research based on climate data, topography, land use and other environmental factors for the 1971–2000 reference period, the commune had a climate of the mountainous-margin type. For the 1988–2017 period, the predominant climate was classified as Cfb under the Köppen climate classification, corresponding to a temperate climate with cool summers and no dry season.

In the 2020 climate typology published by Météo-France, Roquefort-sur-Soulzon is exposed to a mountain or mountain-margin climate. It lies within the south-eastern Massif Central climate region, which is characterised by annual rainfall of 1,000 to 1,500 mm (39 to 59 in), with a summer minimum and an autumn maximum. The commune is also in zone H2c for the purposes of France's 2020 environmental regulations for new buildings.

For the 1971–2000 period, the mean annual temperature was 11.7 °C (53.1 °F), with an annual thermal amplitude of 4.2 °C (7.6 °F). Mean annual precipitation was 990 mm (39 in), with 10.7 days of precipitation in January and 4.9 days in July. For the 1991–2020 period, the nearest Météo-France weather station, at La Cavalerie, about 14 km (8.7 mi) away, recorded a mean annual temperature of 10.1 °C (50.2 °F) and mean annual precipitation of 934.2 mm (36.78 in).

== Classification ==
As of 1 January 2024, Roquefort-sur-Soulzon is classified by INSEE as a rural commune with dispersed settlement, according to the seven-level municipal density grid defined by INSEE in 2022. It lies outside any urban unit and outside the catchment area of any city.

=== Settlements ===
The main village has about 170 permanent inhabitants; the rest of the population is dispersed among hamlets and other settlements including Le Bousquet Bas, Le Bousquet Haut, Caumillas, Les Espires, Lauras, Montégut, Moussac, Pradeilles, Saint-Privat, Salès and Tendigues.

Lauras is a village of nearly 500 inhabitants, about 3 km (1.9 mi) from the main village. Its population is growing, and its surrounding land is rich in fossils.

== History ==
Prehistoric remains have been found within the territory of Roquefort-sur-Soulzon, notably in the Taulan cave. A sandstone millstone from the cave, dated to the Middle Neolithic between 4500 and 3300 BC, is held in the collections of the Musée Fenaille in Rodez.

The history of the commune is closely linked to that of Roquefort cheese. In 1411, letters patent issued by Charles VI of France protected local production, and in 1457 a charter of Charles VII of France reinforced this status.

On 31 August 1666, a judgment of the Parlement of Toulouse recognised the sole right of the inhabitants of Roquefort to mature cheese in the village caves and imposed penalties for counterfeits made in the surrounding area.

A law of 26 July 1925 guaranteed the Appellation d'origine contrôlée of Roquefort cheese. It reserved the name "Roquefort" for cheeses prepared exclusively from sheep's milk and made and matured according to local, traditional customs, particularly as regards the place of maturing and the method used.

== Politics and administration ==
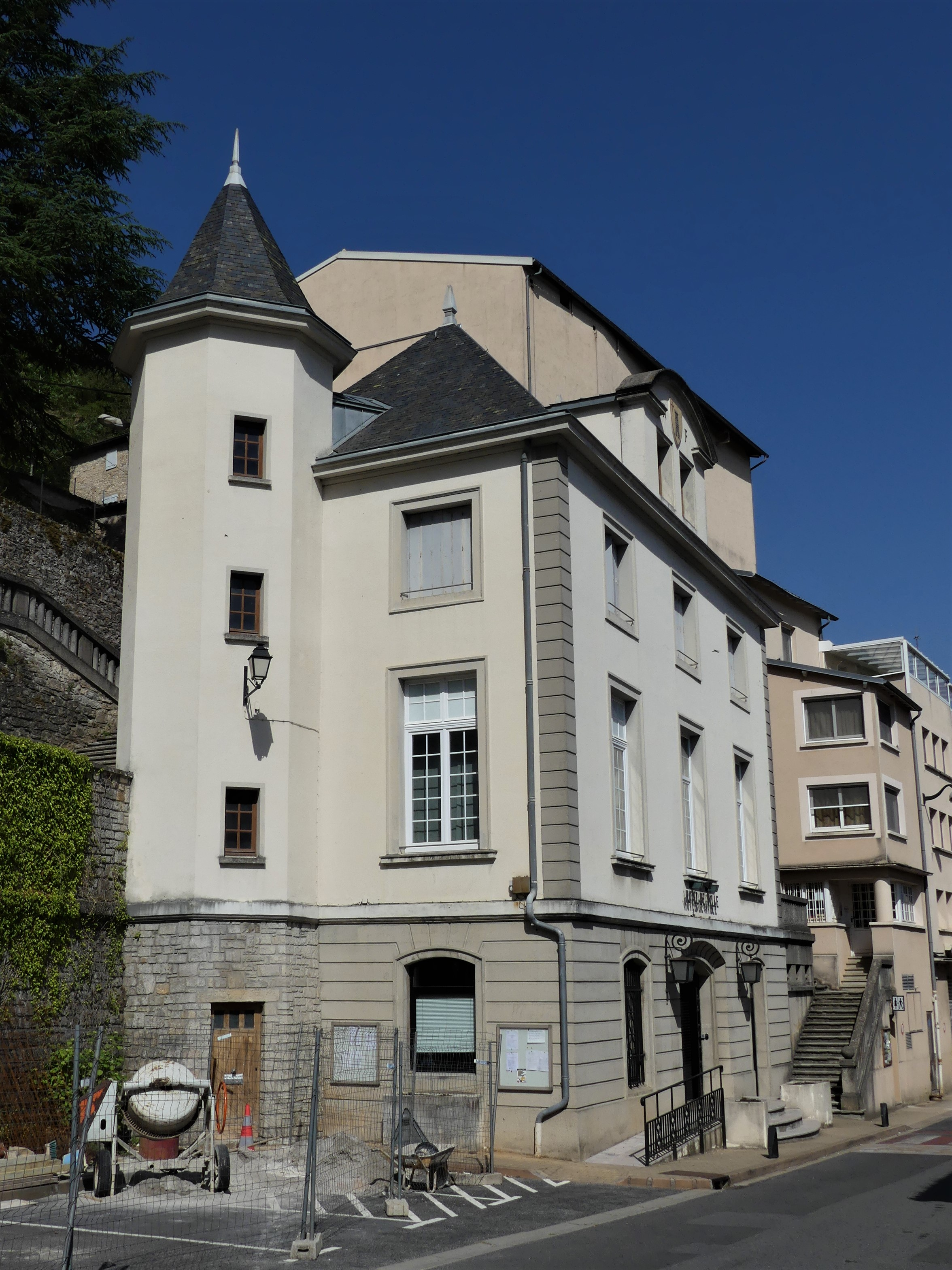
Town hall in 2019.

=== List of mayors ===
| Term | Mayor | Notes |
|---|---|---|
| 1813–1830 | Antoine Laumière | |
| 1830–1836 | Marcelin Barascud | |
| 1836–1847 | Étienne Vernhet | |
| 1847–1878 | Amédée Coupiac | |
| 1878–1890 | Eugène Abeille | Died in office on 8 January 1890. |
| 1890–1904 | Auguste Vernières | |
| 1904–1906 | Maurice Seres | |
| 1906–1919 | Louis Maraval | |
| 1920–1939 | Nicolas Régis | Died in office. |
| 1939–1944 | Léon Vernières | First deputy acting as mayor; resigned. |
| 1945–1947 | Louis Treillet | First deputy acting as mayor. |
| 1947–1965 | Jean Gastal | Cheese industrialist. |
| 1965–1971 | Henri Treillet | Executive at the Société des Caves. |
| 1971–1989 | Benjamin Crouzat | Cheese industrialist. |
| 1989–22 October 2025 | Bernard Sirgue | Physician; UMP–LR. |
| October 2025–20 March 2026 | Luc Donnadieu | |
| 20 March 2026–present | Yannick Rouquette | |

== Demographics ==
Historical population
| Year | Pop. | ±% p.a. |
|---|---|---|
| 1968 | 1,349 | — |
| 1975 | 949 | −4.90% |
| 1982 | 880 | −1.07% |
| 1990 | 789 | −1.36% |
| 1999 | 679 | −1.65% |
| 2007 | 691 | +0.22% |
| 2012 | 620 | −2.15% |
| 2017 | 552 | −2.30% |
| 2023 | 475 | −2.47% |
Source: INSEE

== Economy ==
=== Income ===
In 2021, the commune had 231 fiscal households, comprising 492 people. The median disposable income per consumption unit was €23,390.

=== Employment ===
In 2022, the population aged 15 to 64 numbered 319. Of these, 75.6% were economically active, including 71.0% in employment and 4.6% unemployed, while 24.4% were inactive. The unemployment rate in the census sense was 6.1% in 2022, compared with 9.4% in 2016 and 8.7% in 2011.

The commune is outside the catchment area of any city. It had 1,170 jobs in 2022, compared with 1,094 in 2016 and 1,138 in 2011. Salaried positions accounted for 93.2% of jobs in the commune in 2022.

Of the 227 employed residents aged 15 or over in 2022, 119 worked in the commune, or 52.6% of employed residents. For commuting to work, 75.1% of residents used a car, van or lorry, 16.7% walked, 2.5% used public transport, 2.5% used a motorised two-wheeler, 1.8% cycled and 1.4% did not need to travel.

=== Non-agricultural activity ===
On 31 December 2023, Roquefort-sur-Soulzon had 83 economically active non-agricultural establishments.

| Sector | Number | % |
|---|---|---|
| Total | 83 | 100% |
| Manufacturing, mining and other industrial activities | 18 | 21.7% |
| Construction | 7 | 8.4% |
| Wholesale and retail trade, transport, accommodation and food services | 31 | 37.3% |
| Information and communication | 2 | 2.4% |
| Financial and insurance activities | 7 | 8.4% |
| Real estate activities | 2 | 2.4% |
| Professional, scientific and technical activities; administrative and support services | 9 | 10.8% |
| Public administration, education, human health and social work | 6 | 7.2% |
| Other service activities | 1 | 1.2% |

The sector comprising wholesale and retail trade, transport, accommodation and food services was the largest in the commune, with 31 establishments, or 37.3% of the total. Manufacturing, mining and other industrial activities accounted for 18 establishments, or 21.7% of the total. In 2024, 11 establishments were created in the commune, including four in manufacturing, mining and other industrial activities.

=== Roquefort cheese ===
The commune is principally known for the cheese of the same name, Roquefort. The cheese is matured in the Roquefort caves, which are cut into the Combalou rock. Natural cracks known as fleurines ventilate the caves and help create the conditions required for maturing the cheese.

Roquefort-sur-Soulzon retains significant agro-industrial activity connected with the maturing and trade of Roquefort cheese. In 2023, establishments with employees in the commune had 1,192 employees; trade, transport and other services accounted for 629 employees, or 52.8% of the workforce, and industry for 504 employees, or 42.3%.

=== Agriculture ===
The commune lies in the Grands Causses, a small agricultural region occupying the south-eastern part of the Aveyron department. In 2020, the main technical and economic orientation of agriculture in the commune was sheep or goat farming.

| Year | Farms | Utilised agricultural area |
|---|---|---|
| 1988 | 10 | 834 ha (2,060 acres) |
| 2000 | 6 | 915 ha (2,260 acres) |
| 2010 | 5 | 960 ha (2,400 acres) |
| 2020 | 8 | 955 ha (2,360 acres) |

Eight farms with their headquarters in the commune were recorded in the 2020 agricultural census, compared with ten in 1988. The utilised agricultural area was 955 ha (2,360 acres).

== Culture and heritage ==
=== Industrial and gastronomic heritage ===
The commune is known for the Roquefort caves, developed in the natural caves of the Combalou rock. These caves were formed by the collapse of the limestone plateau; their natural cracks, known as fleurines, ventilate the cellars and contribute to the conditions in which Roquefort cheese matures.

Several maturing caves are open to visitors in Roquefort-sur-Soulzon, including those of the Société, Papillon, Gabriel Coulet, Le Vieux Berger and Carles houses.

=== Natural and landscape heritage ===
The Combalou rock and its scree slopes dominate the village. The site includes natural caves and cracks, known as fleurines, formed by the collapse of the limestone plateau.

The Sentier des Échelles walking route provides access to the area around the Combalou and offers views over the Larzac, the cirque of Tournemire and the village of Roquefort. The path crosses the Combalou scree and passes near the Saut de Balhol fault, the Combalou sheepfold and the chapel of Saint Peter.

Another route, the Sentier du Menhir, forms a loop in the Soulzon valley. It takes its name from a stone about 3 m (9.8 ft) high, bearing two engraved crosses, whose origin remains uncertain.

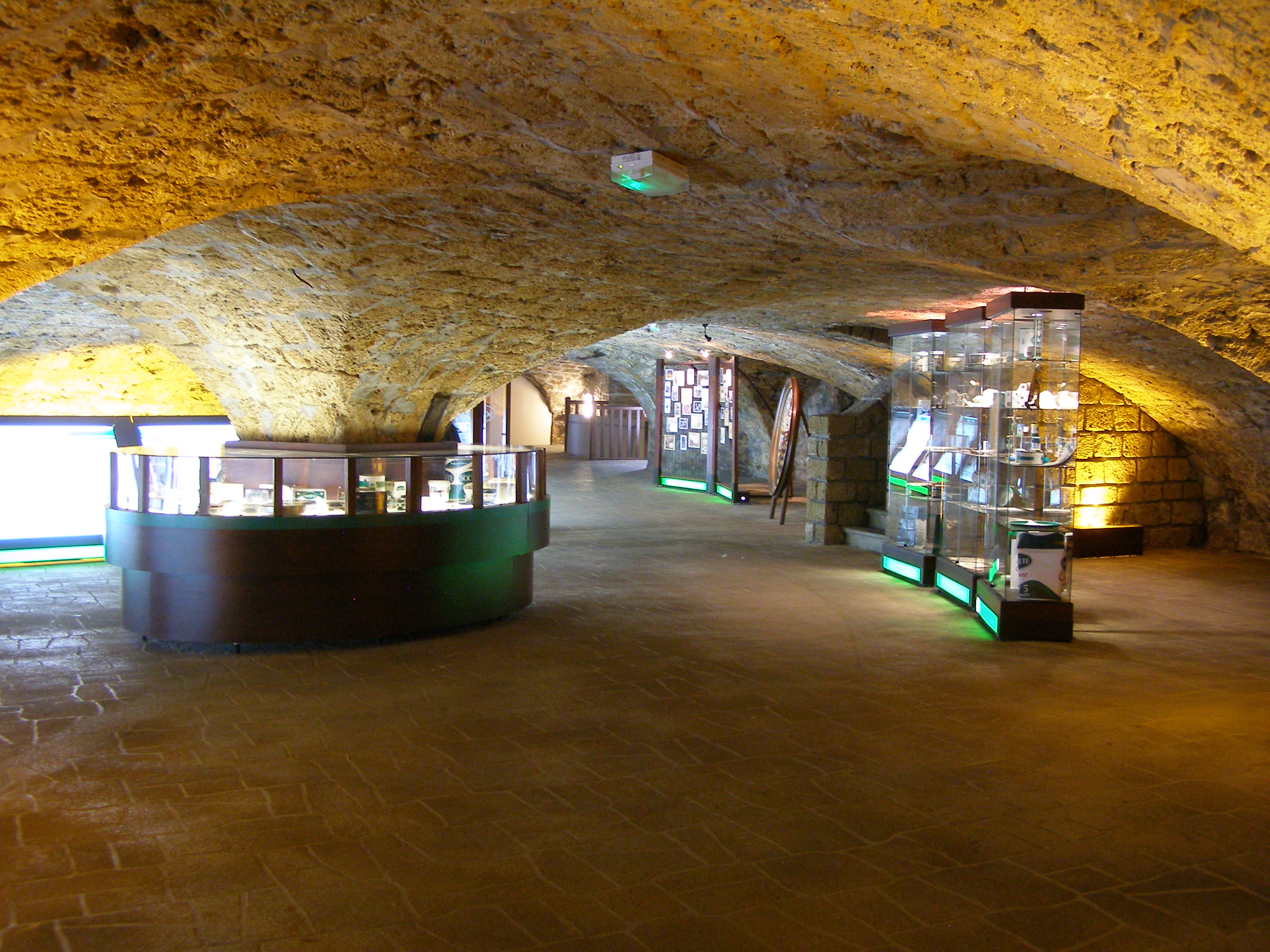
Cellar selling Roquefort cheese.

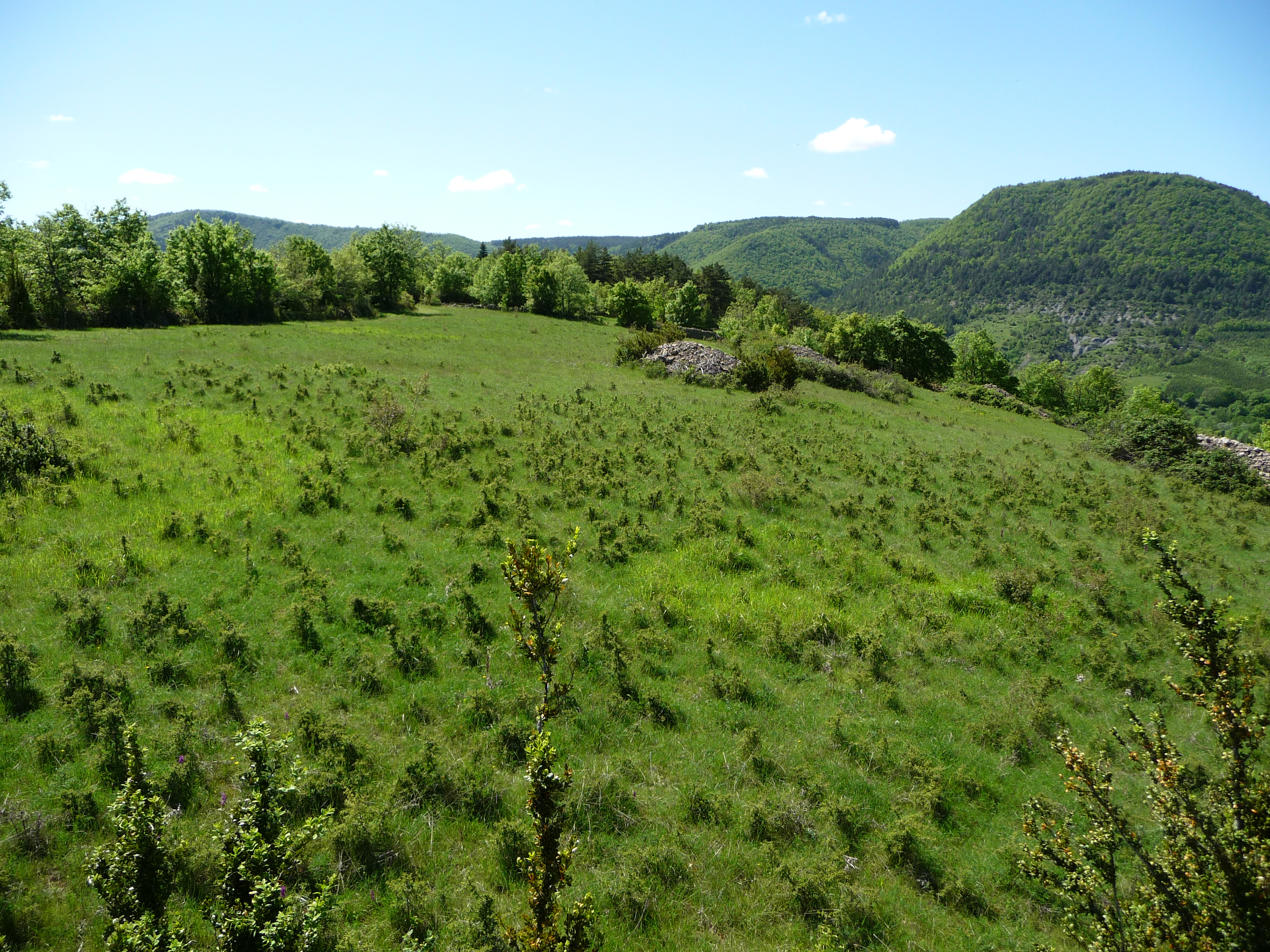
Sheep pasture on limestone terrain.

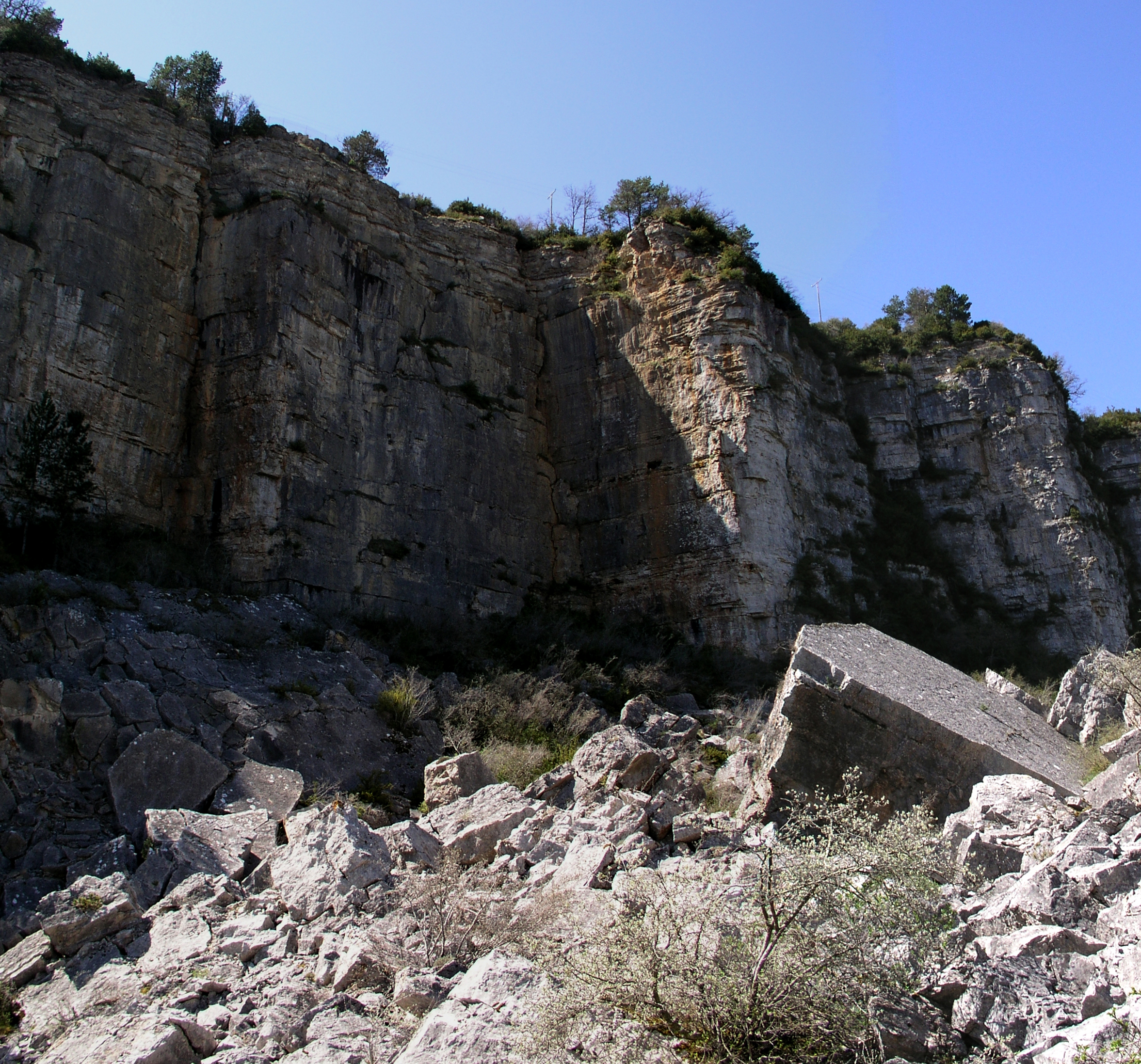
Boulder field below the Combalou rock.

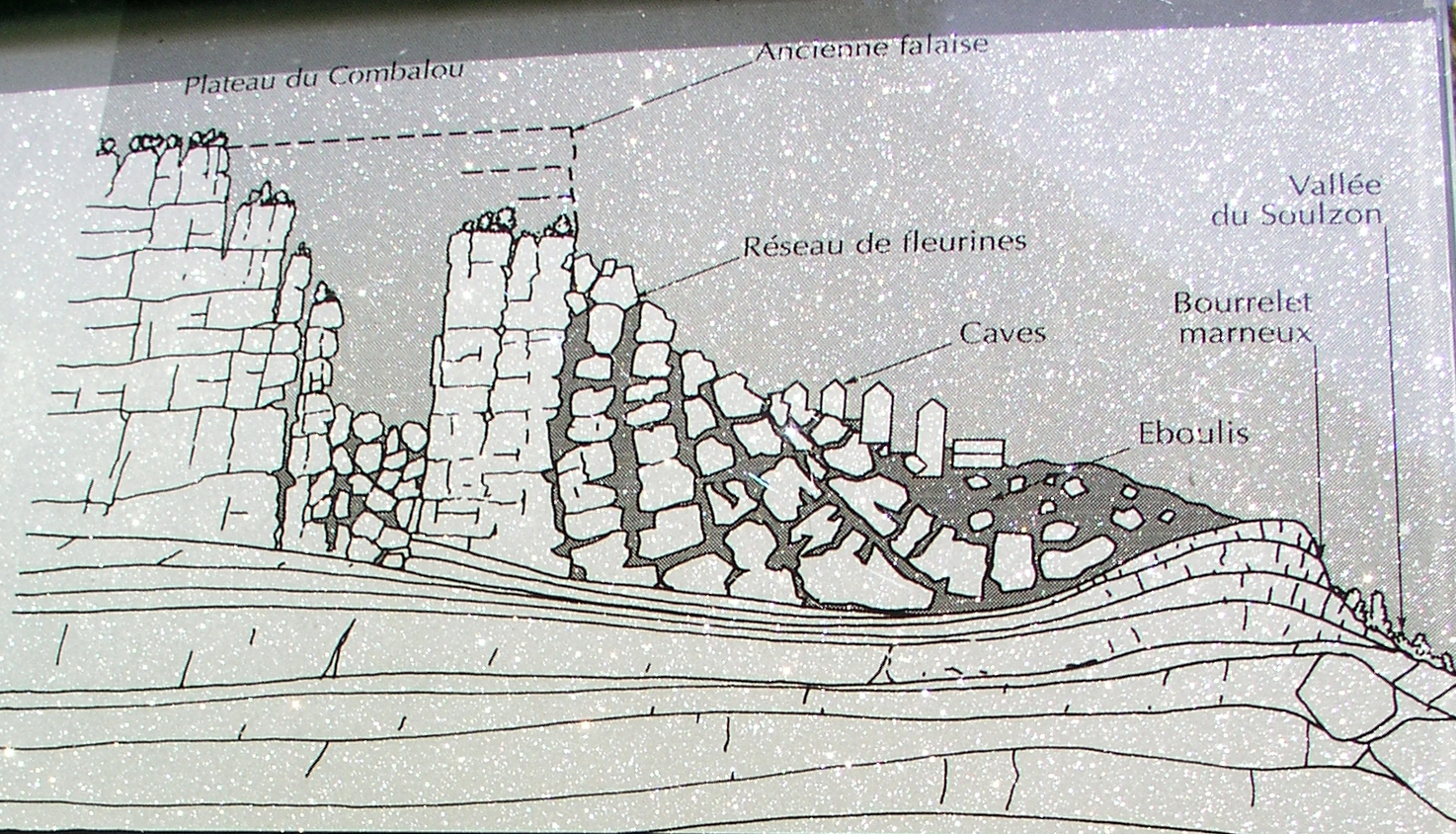
Information panel on the Sentier des Échelles.

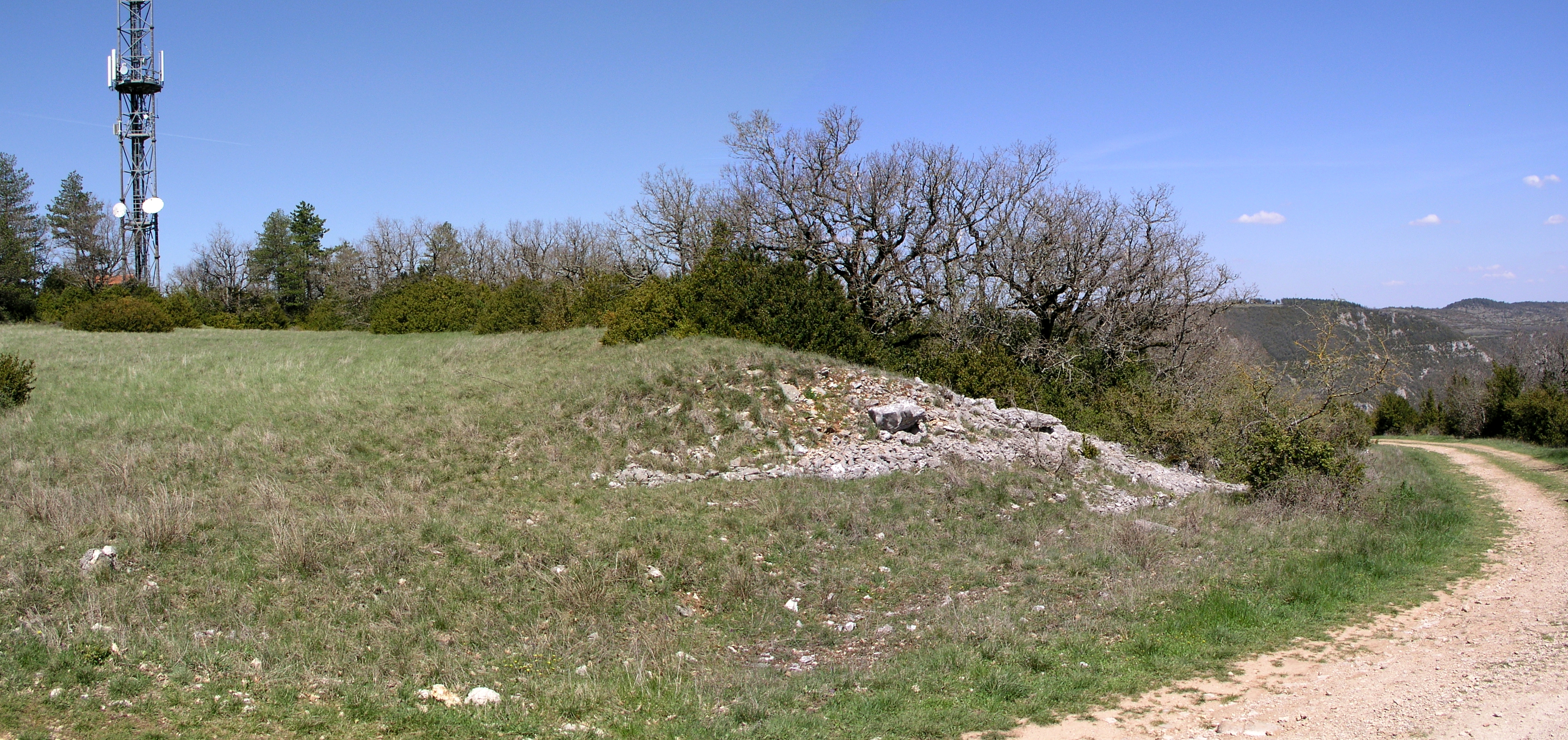
Section through the protohistoric rampart of the Combalou.

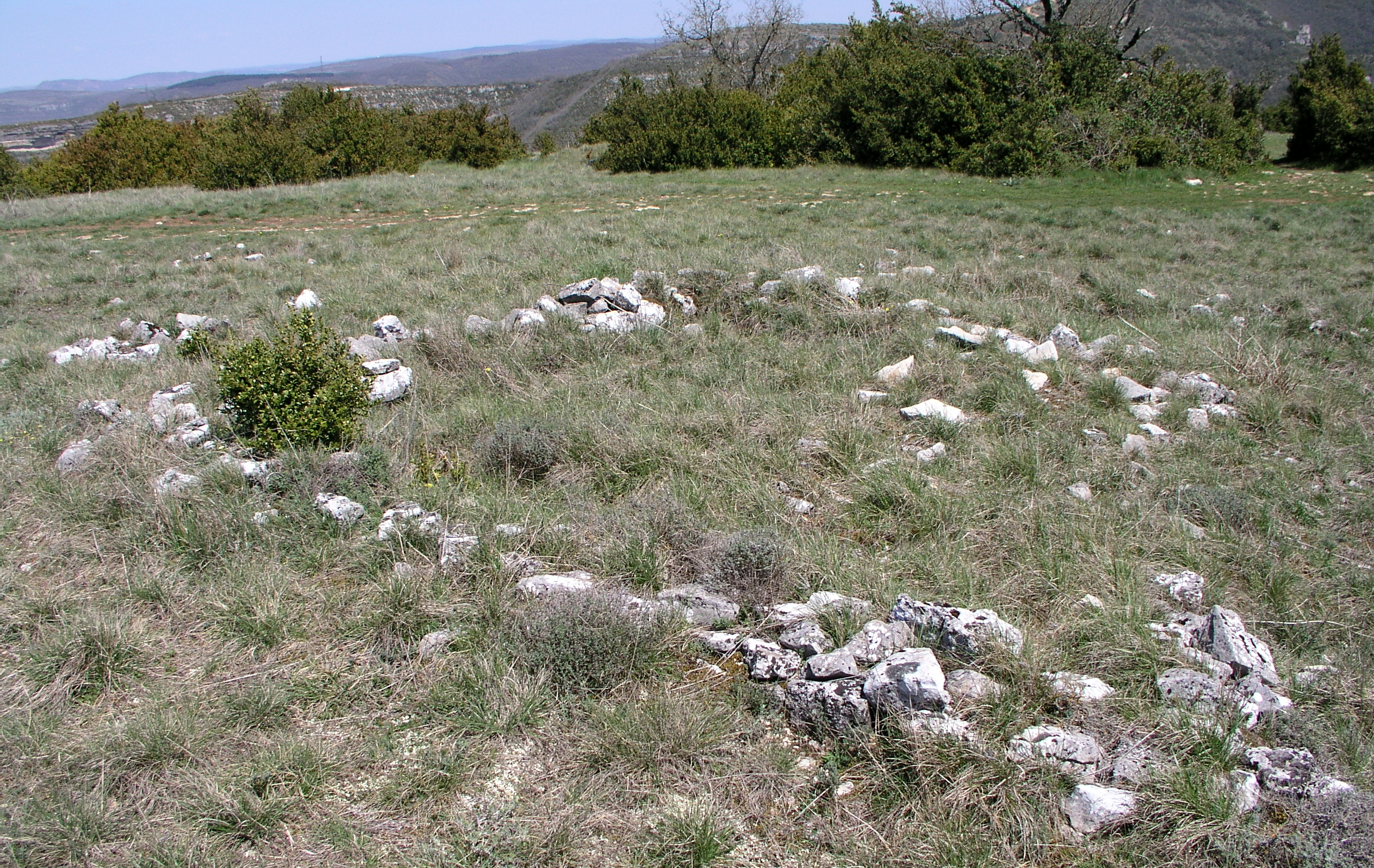
Ruins of the Combalou temple.

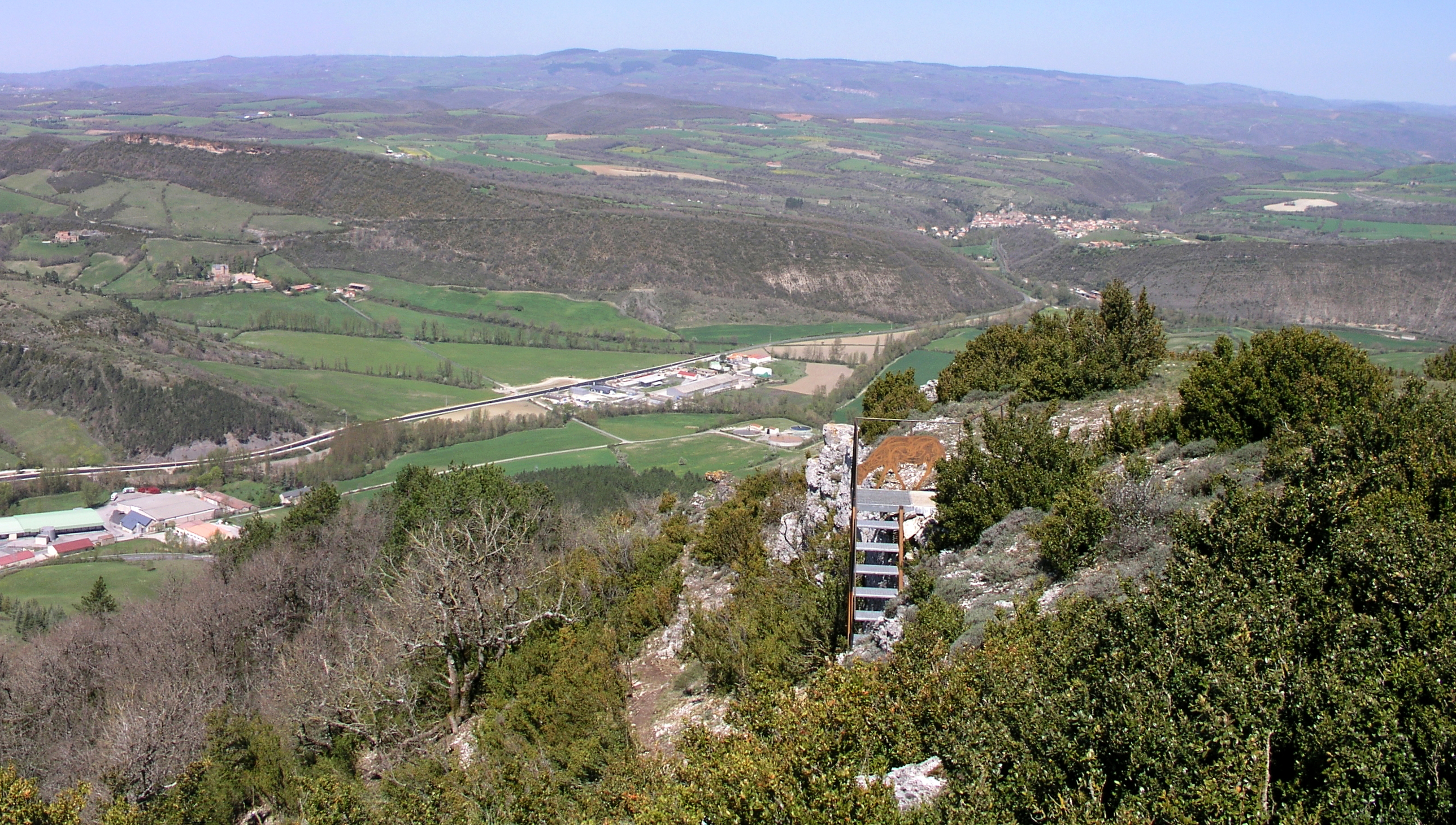
The Sentier des Échelles near the summit of the Combalou.

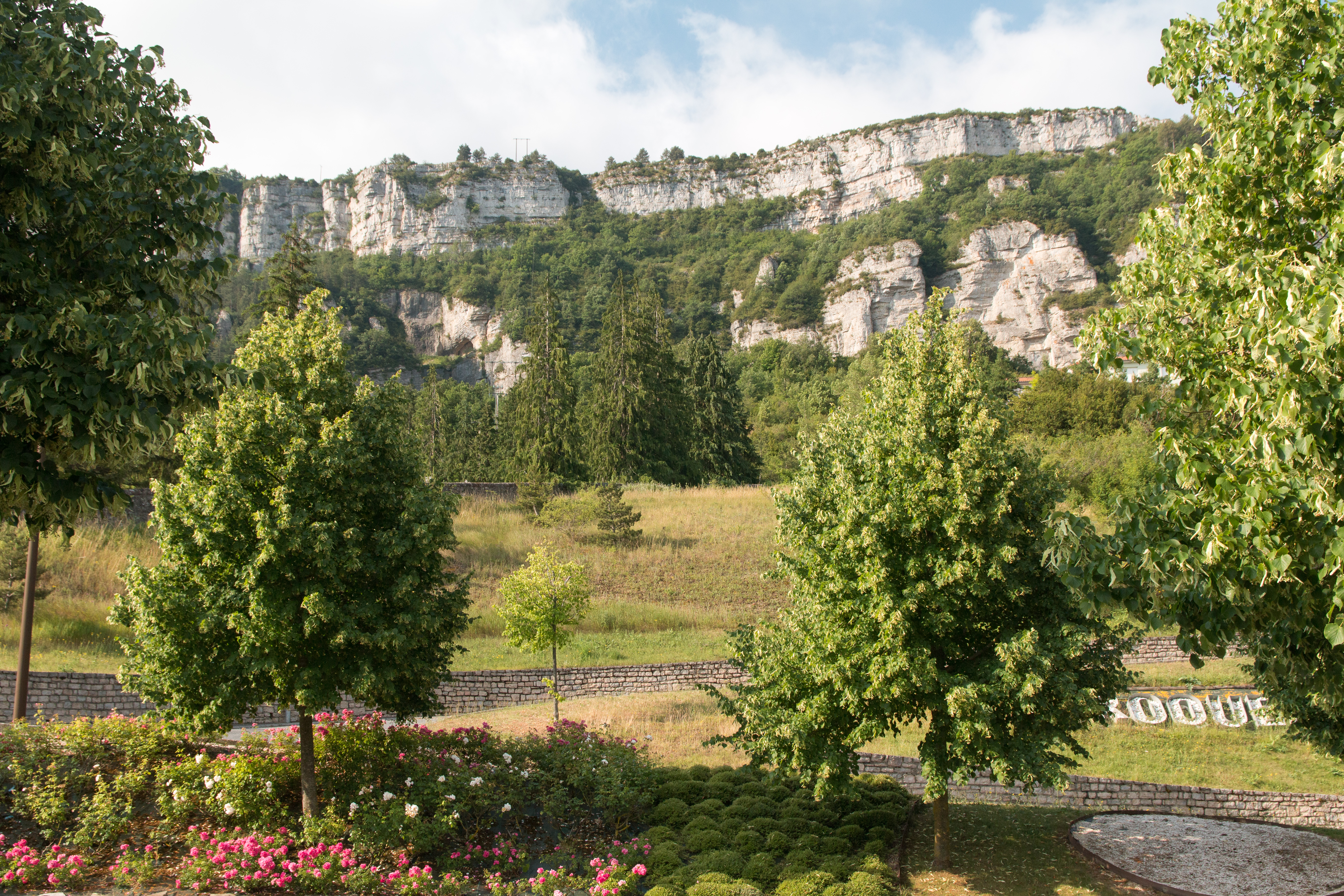
The Combalou rock.

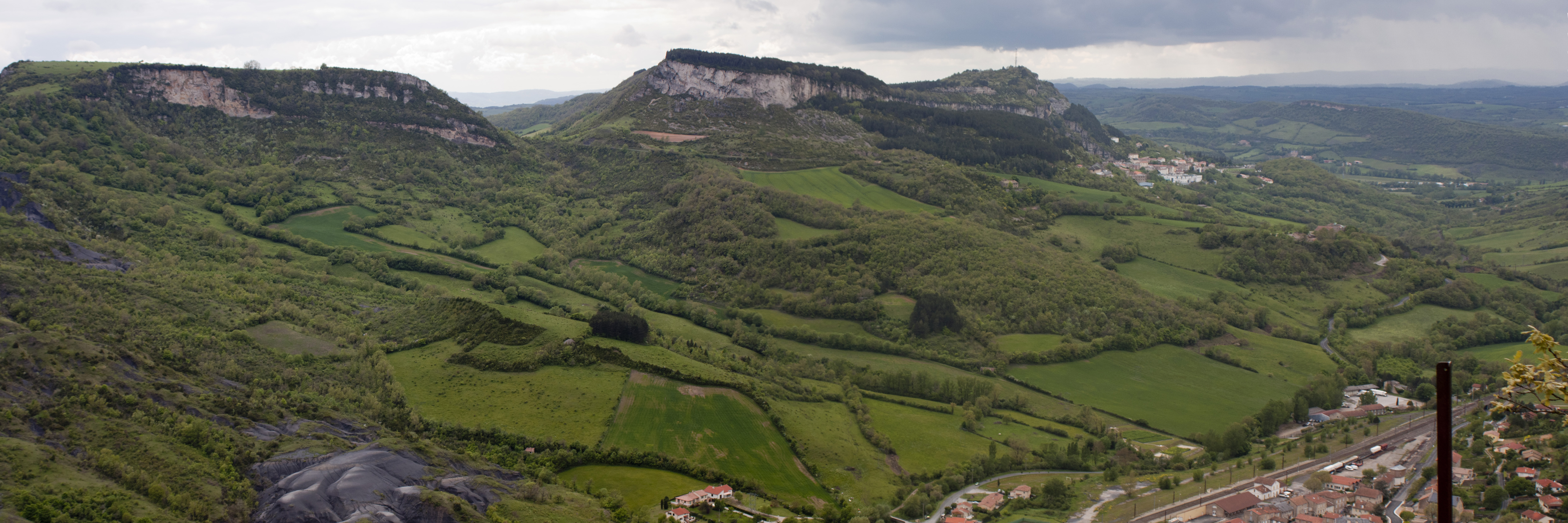
Panorama towards Roquefort-sur-Soulzon.

=== Religious buildings ===
- The parish church of Saint Peter, dating from the 19th century and altered in 1957–1958, has a comb-shaped bell-gable with five bells.
- The ruins of the 11th-century chapel of Saint Peter.
- The church of Saint Privat at Lauras.
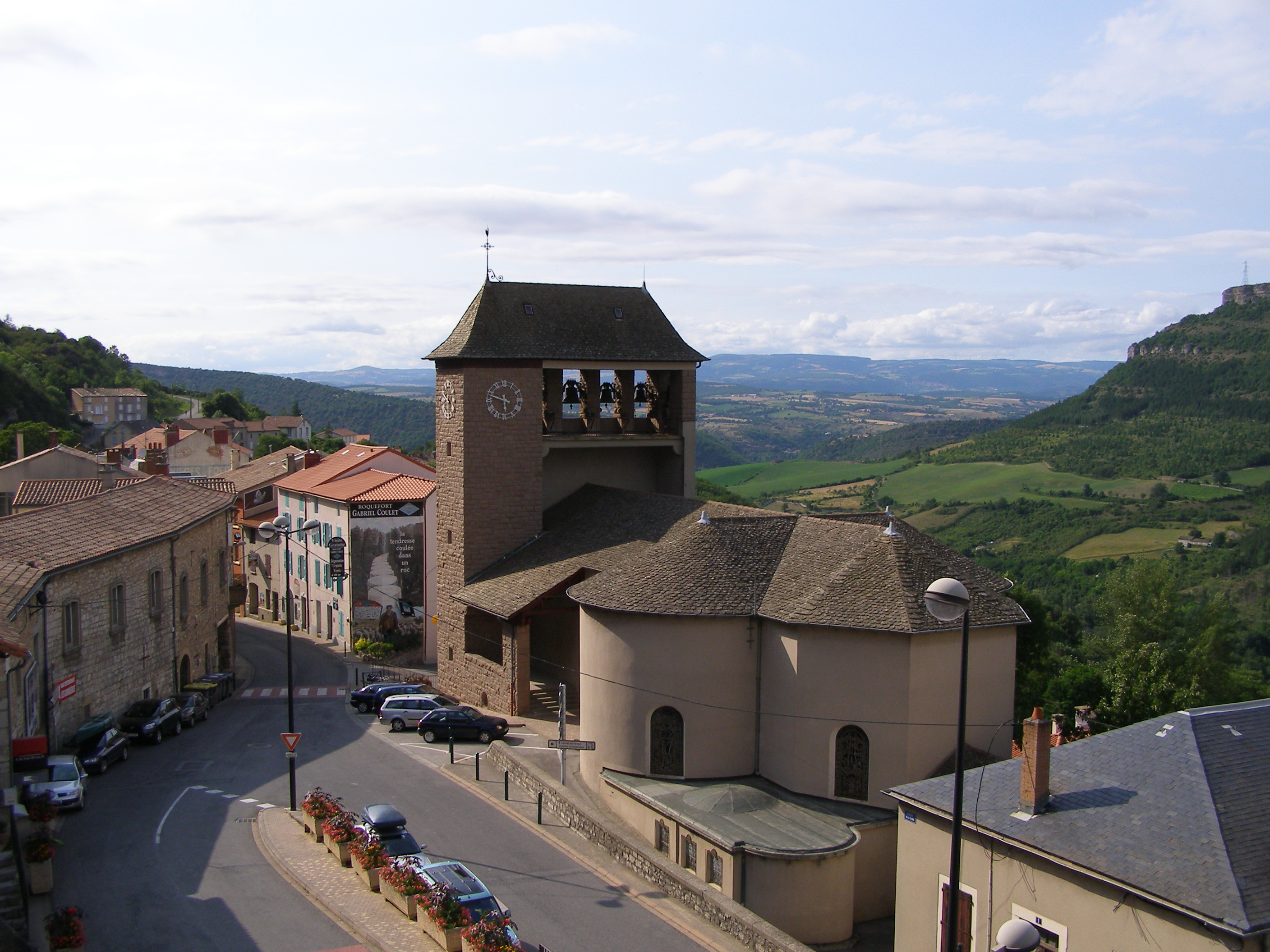
The parish church of Saint Peter.

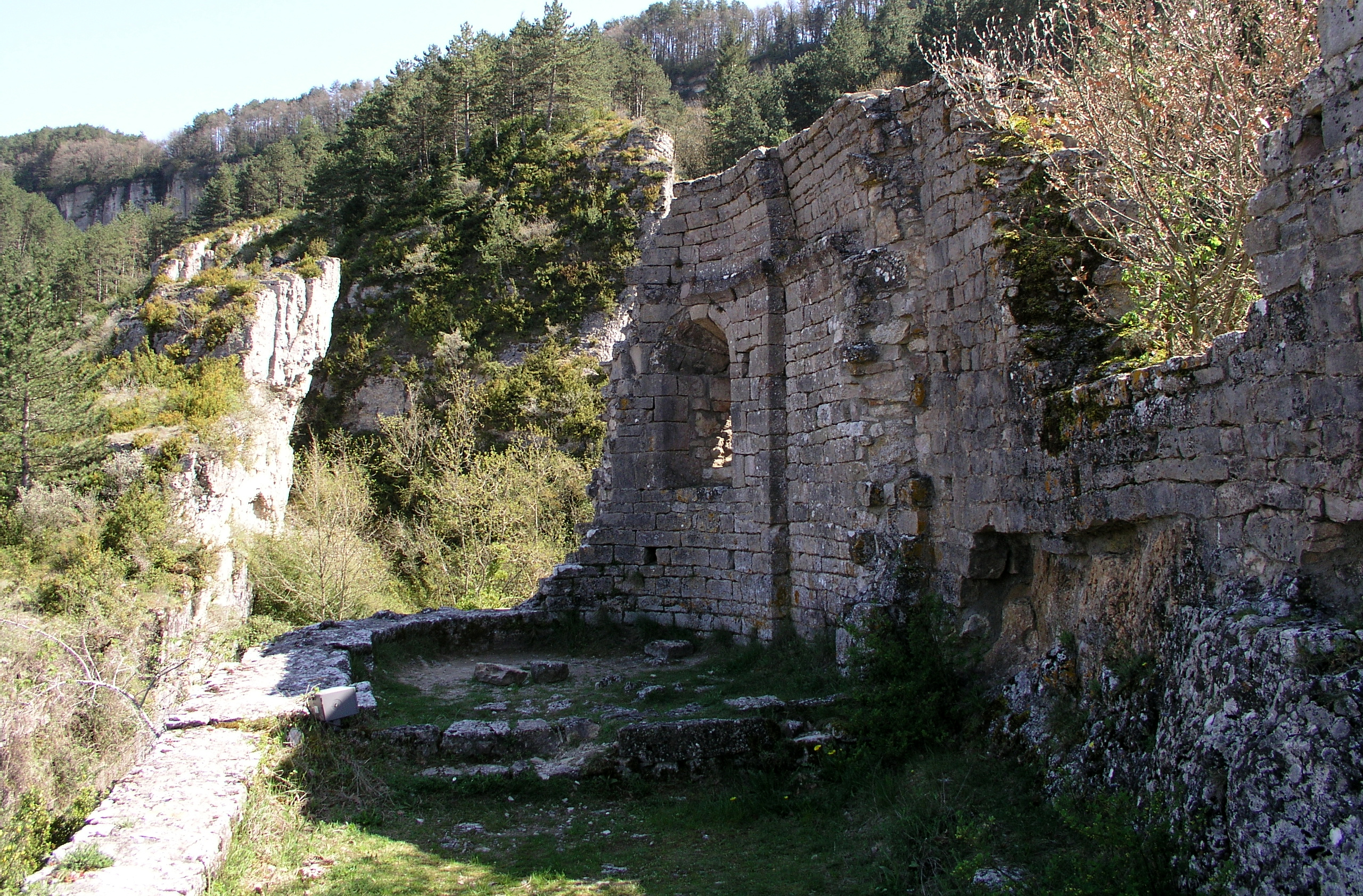
Ruins of the chapel of Saint Peter.

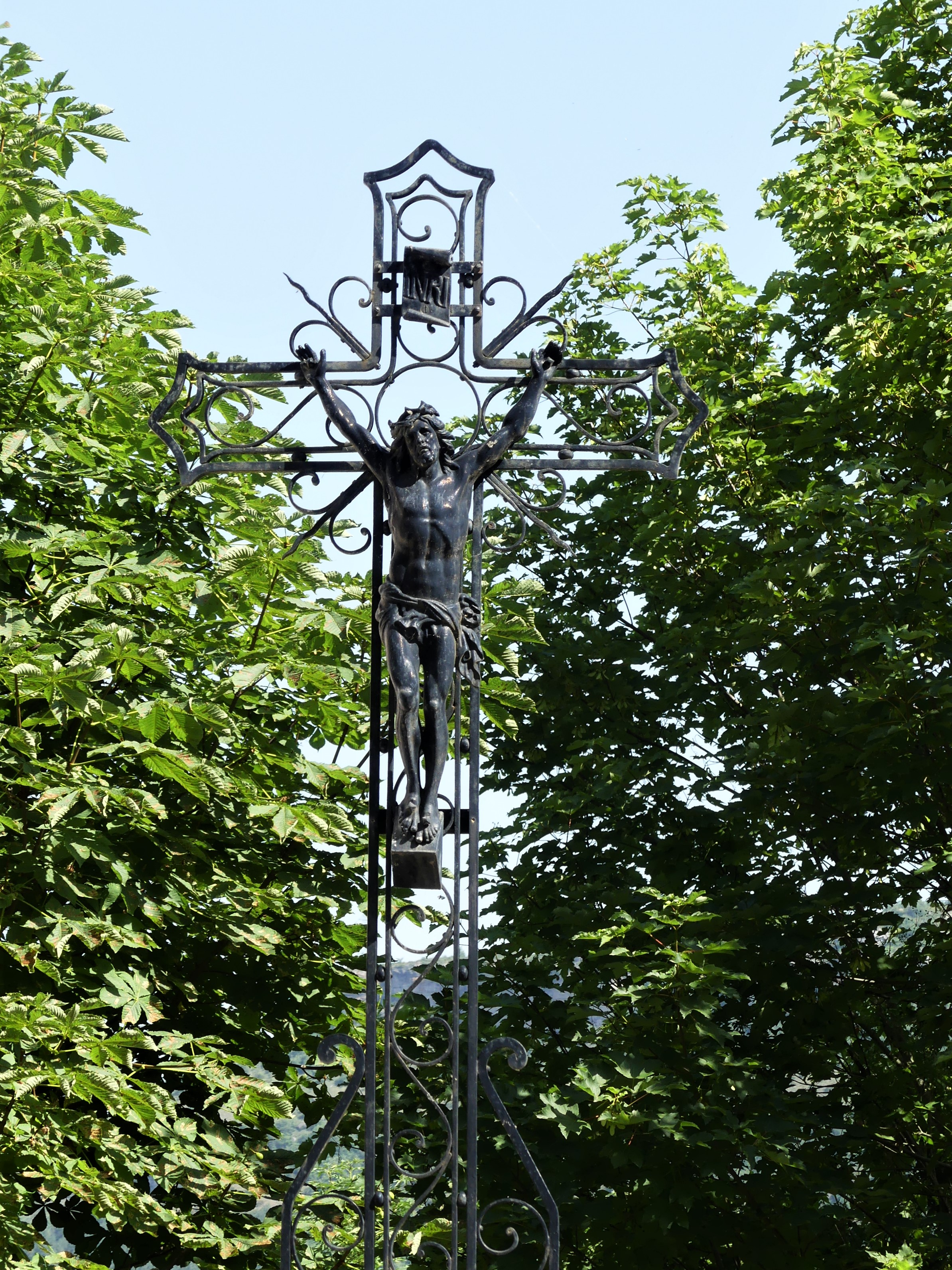
Crucifix in the village.

=== People associated with the commune ===
- Maurice Astruc (1938–2012), master affineur of Roquefort cheese, known for his appearances in advertising.

=== Heraldry ===
| Arms of Roquefort-sur-Soulzon | Argent, a tower sable, open and windowed of the field, accompanied in dexter chief by a cross fleury fitchy also sable. |

== Gallery ==
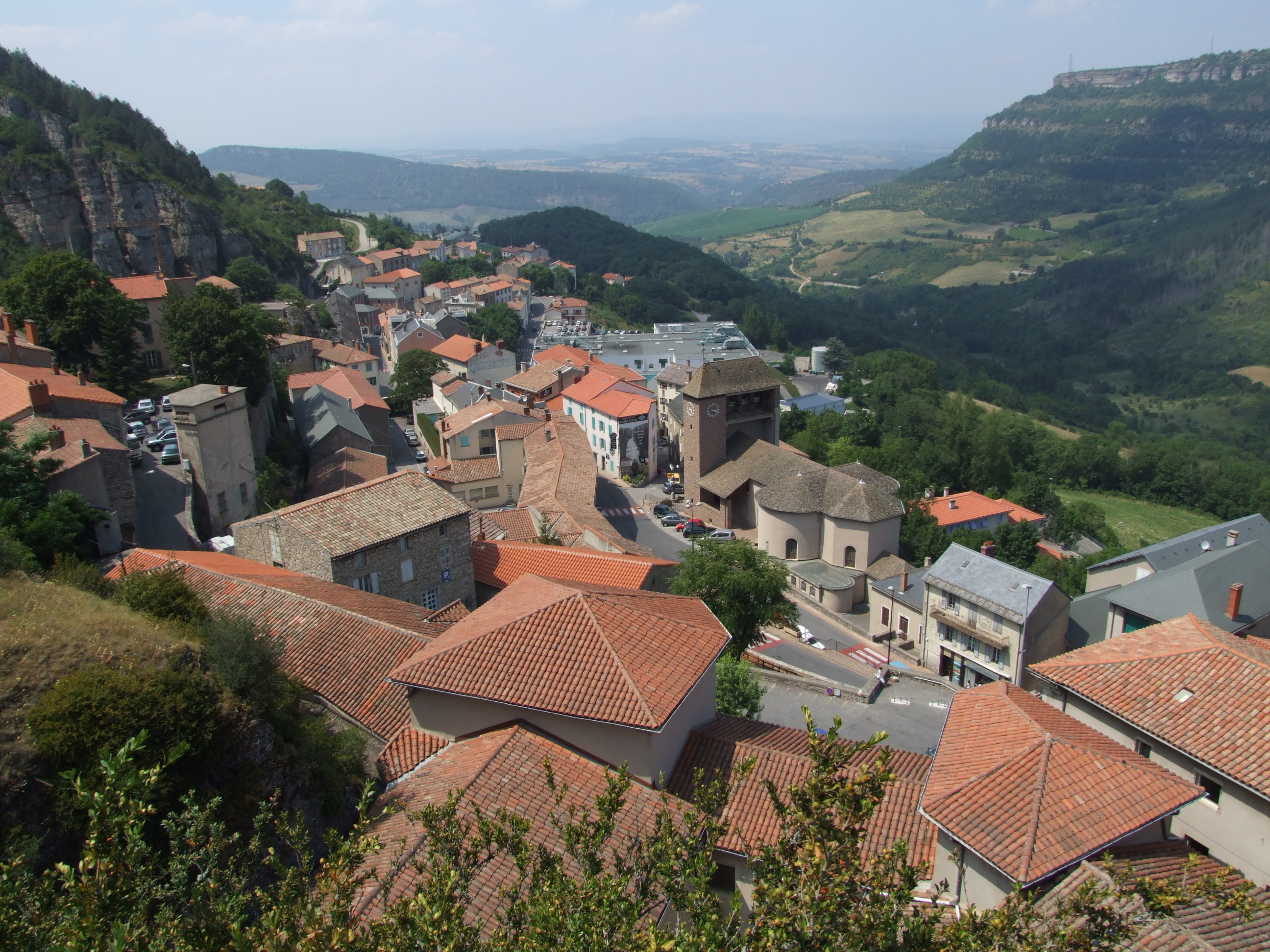
The village of Roquefort-sur-Soulzon.

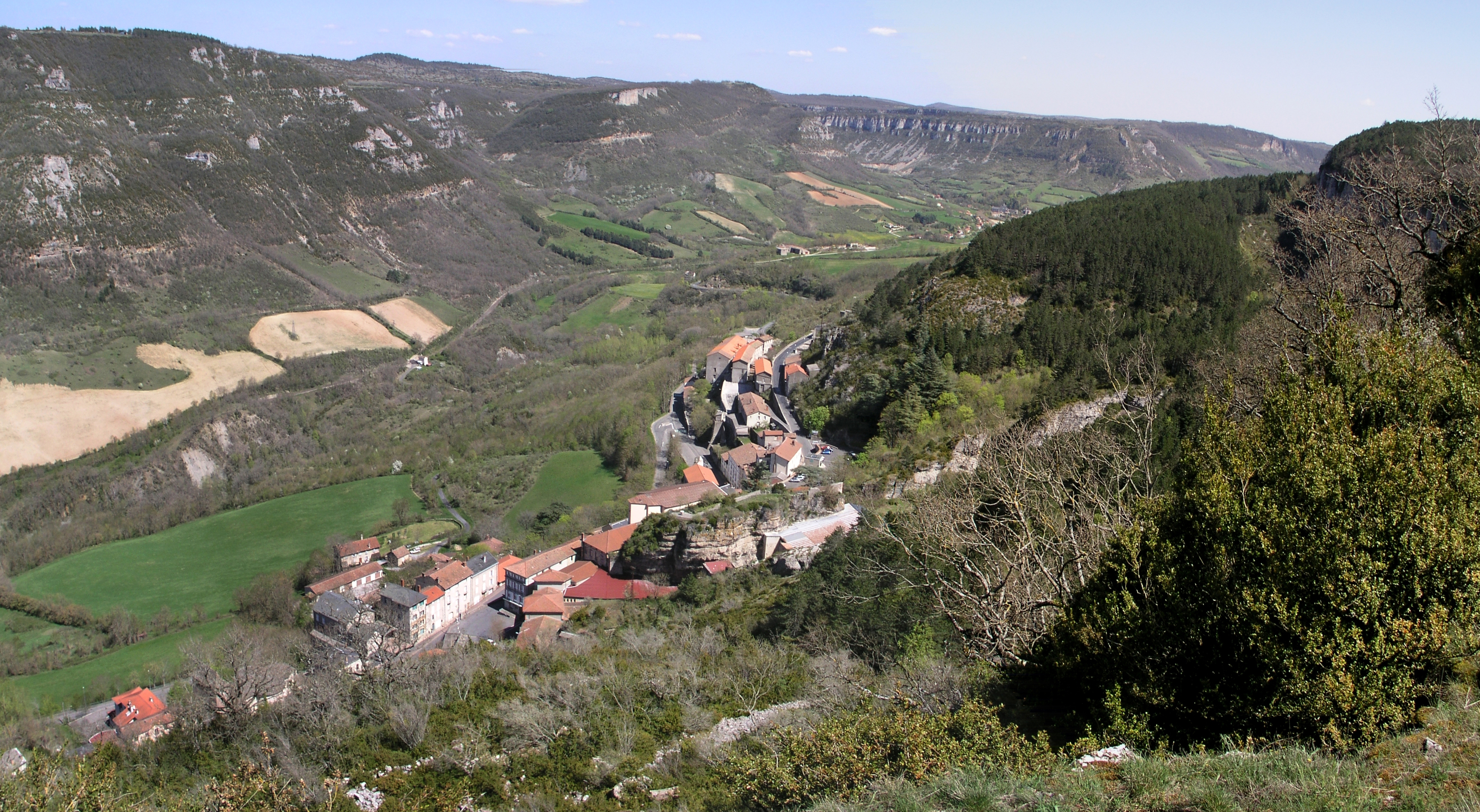
View of the village from the slopes of the Combalou rock.

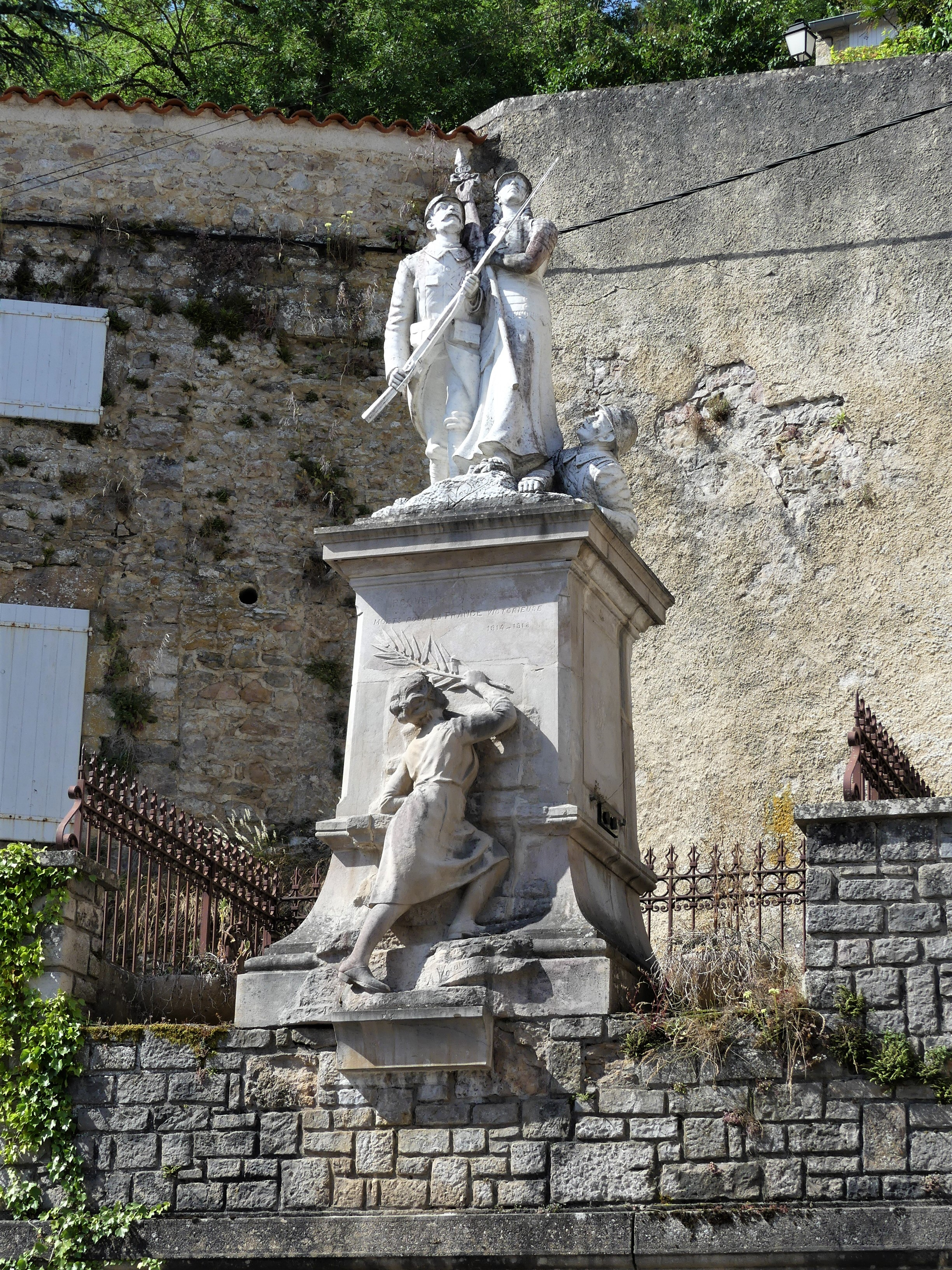
The war memorial.

== See also ==
- Communes of the Aveyron department
- Grands Causses Regional Natural Park
- Roquefort cheese
- Caves of Roquefort
