= La Bastide-Pradines =

Commune in Occitanie, France

La Bastide-Pradines La Bastida de Pradinas (Occitan)
- Commune
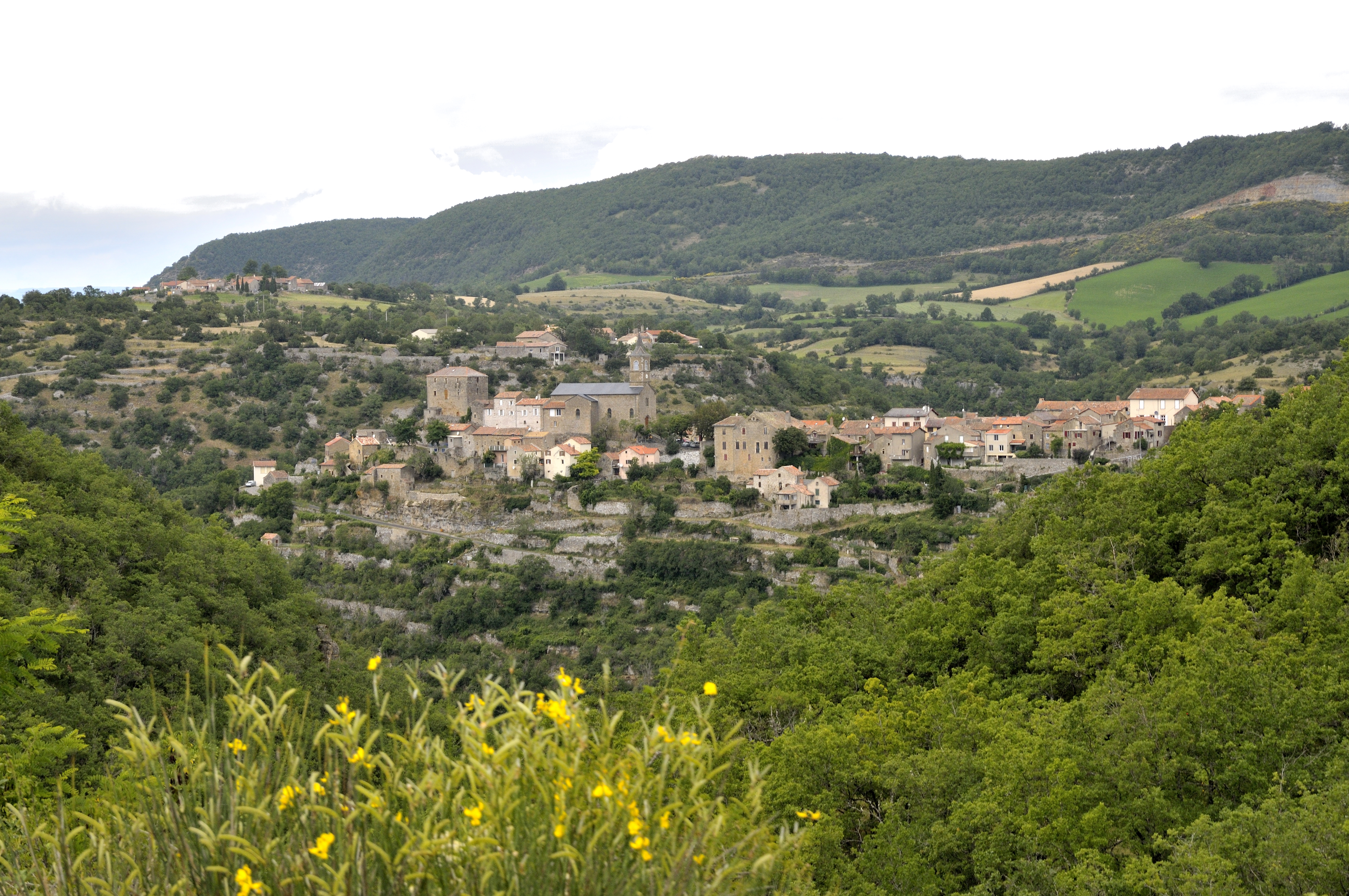
- A general view of La Bastide-Pradines
- Location of La Bastide-Pradines
- Location within France Location within Occitanie
- Coordinates: 44°00′09″N 3°02′50″E
- Country: France
- Region: Occitania
- Department: Aveyron
- Arrondissement: Millau
- Canton: Saint-Affrique
- Intercommunality: Larzac et Vallées

Government
  - Mayor (2020–2026): Yves Malric
- Area^{1}: 20.56 km^{2} (7.94 sq mi)
- Elevation: 574 m (1,883 ft)
- Highest elevation: 862 m (2,828 ft)
- Lowest elevation: 460 m (1,510 ft)
- Population (2023): 122
  - Density: 5.93/km^{2} (15.4/sq mi)
- Time zone: UTC+01:00 (CET)
  - Summer (DST): UTC+02:00 (CEST)
- INSEE/Postal code: 12022 /12490
- ^{1} French Land Register data, which excludes lakes, ponds, glaciers > 1 km^{2} (0.386 sq mi or 247 acres) and river estuaries.

La Bastide-Pradines (French pronunciation: [la bastid pʁadin]; Occitan: La Bastida de Pradinas or La Bastida Pradinas) is a commune in the Aveyron department in the Occitanie region of Southern France.

The inhabitants of the commune are known as Bastidois (masculine) or Bastidoises (feminine) in French.

== Geography ==
La Bastide-Pradines is located some 50 km south-east of Rodez and 10 km north-east of Saint-Affrique in the heart of the Parc naturel régional des Grands Causses. Access to the commune is by the A75 autoroute which passes through the north of the commune from north-west to east with Exit 46 in the commune and connecting to the D999. The D999 comes from Saint-Rome-de-Cernon in the west and passes through the centre of the commune north of the village and continues east to Exit 47 on the autoroute and to La Cavalerie. The D77 branches from Saint-Rome-de-Cernon by a southern route through the commune and the village and continues east to Lapanouse-de-Cernon. The D560 connects the village to the D999 to the north in the commune. A disused railway line passes through the commune from west to east south of the village. The commune is heavily forested in the south with the rest mainly farmland.

The Cernon river flows through the commune and the village from east to west and continues west then north joining the Tarn east of Comprégnac. The Ruisseau de Coufours rises in the north of the commune and flows south to join the Cernon near the village. The Ruisseau de Saute-Bouc rises in the north-east of the commune and flows south-west to join the Ruisseau de Coufours just north of the village. The Ruisseau des Clarous rises in the south of the commune and flows north to join the Cernon.

== Toponymy ==
La Bastide-Pradines appears as la Baftide de Pradines on the 1750 Cassini Map and as la Bastide de Pradines on the 1790 version.

== History ==
Formerly called La Bastide de Sernonenque, La Bastide-Pradines was once a Commandry of the Knights Hospitaller.

== Administration ==
List of Successive Mayors

Mayors from the French Revolution to 1925

| From | To | Name |
|---|---|---|
| 1793 | 1795 | Antoine Bosc |
| 1795 | 1800 | Joseph Calvet |
| 1801 | 1815 | Jean Pierre Vernhes |
| 1816 | 1858 | Louis Marie Antoine Gasc de la Gineste |
| 1859 | 1865 | Auguste Soutou |
| 1865 | 1871 | Gédéon Joseph Paul Caylet |
| 1871 | 1876 | Pierre Gazel |
| 1876 | 1886 | Benjamin Sigaud |
| 1886 | 1888 | Etienne Lacoste |
| 1888 | 1896 | Gualy de la Gineste |
| 1896 | 1900 | Auguste Malzac |
| 1900 | 1908 | Auguste Malzac |
| 1908 | 1925 | Jules Soutou |

Mayors from 1925

| From | To | Name |
|---|---|---|
| 1925 | 1956 | Emile de Gualy |
| 1956 | 1977 | Gabriel Malric |
| 1977 | 1983 | Augustin Mailhe |
| 1983 | 1995 | Alain Arnal |
| 2001 | 2008 | Emilien Boutonnet |
| 2008 | 2014 | Agnès Comby |
| 2014 | 2026 | Yves Malric |

== Demography ==
Historical population

| Year | Pop. | ±% p.a. |
|---|---|---|
| 1793 | 347 | — |
| 1800 | 417 | +2.66% |
| 1841 | 467 | +0.28% |
| 1846 | 486 | +0.80% |
| 1851 | 463 | −0.96% |
| 1856 | 466 | +0.13% |
| 1861 | 455 | −0.48% |
| 1866 | 435 | −0.89% |
| 1872 | 480 | +1.65% |
| 1876 | 446 | −1.82% |
| 1881 | 463 | +0.75% |
| 1886 | 929 | +14.94% |
| 1891 | 543 | −10.18% |
| 1896 | 385 | −6.65% |
| 1901 | 345 | −2.17% |
| 1906 | 332 | −0.77% |
| 1911 | 333 | +0.06% |

| Year | Pop. | ±% p.a. |
|---|---|---|
| 1921 | 253 | −2.71% |
| 1926 | 258 | +0.39% |
| 1931 | 257 | −0.08% |
| 1936 | 235 | −1.77% |
| 1946 | 189 | −2.15% |
| 1954 | 163 | −1.83% |
| 1962 | 143 | −1.62% |
| 1968 | 143 | +0.00% |
| 1975 | 118 | −2.71% |
| 1982 | 97 | −2.76% |
| 1990 | 102 | +0.63% |
| 1999 | 98 | −0.44% |
| 2007 | 108 | +1.22% |
| 2012 | 109 | +0.18% |
| 2017 | 101 | −1.51% |
| 2023 | 122 | +3.20% |

Source: EHESS and INSEE

== Sites and Monuments ==
- The Granieyras, a fortified granary dating from the 14th century, at the time of the Knights Hospitaller.
- Houses from the 12th century.
- A Two-arch Bridge 17.60 m long, one arch forming a slight donkeyback and the other semicircular.

== Notable people linked to the commune ==
- Emma Calvé, singer, has stayed at La Bastide-Pradines with her aunt.

== Bibliography ==
- Christian-Pierre Bedel, preface by Jean-Luc Malet, Sent-Africa, La Bastida, Caumèls-e-Lo Vialar, Ròcafòrt, Sant-Faliç, Sent-Esèri, Sent-Jan, D'Aucàpias, Sent-Roma de Sarnon, Tornamira, Vabre, Verzòls-e-La Pèira / Christian-Pierre Bedel e los estatjants del canton de Sent-Africa, Rodez, Mission départementale de la culture, 2002, Al canton collection, 429 pages, ill., cov. ill. 28 cm, ISBN 2-907279-54-8, ISSN 1151-8375, BnF 38977452h (in Occitan)

== See also ==
- Communes of the Aveyron department
