= Africus =

Africus may refer to:

- Africus (mythology) or Lips (mythology), the deity of the south west wind
- Saint Africus, 7th-century French saint
- Africus, the 1995 Johannesburg Biennale exhibition
