= Cazelle de Saint Affrique =

French cheese

- Country of origin: France
- Region: Midi-Pyrénées, Aveyron Department
- Source of milk: Sheep
- Pasteurized: Yes
- Texture: Soft
- Aging time: 6-9 weeks

Cazelle de Saint Affrique (Occitan: Cazelle de Sant Afric) is a soft-ripened, pungent cheese, made from pasteurized sheep's milk in the Midi-Pyrénées region of France. It is an artisan cheese, hand-fashioned in small rounds.

The cheese derives its name from the cazelle, a stone building common in Aveyron, the area where the cheese originates. Cazelles are used to house hay, and to shelter the local shepherds and their sheep. The Saint Affrique portion of the name references the commune of Saint Affrique, where the cheese is processed.

The cheese is made in a manner similar to Crottin de Chavignol. At six weeks old it has a smooth, dense and slightly gummy texture. The flavor is mildly nutty, with a very clean finish. The edible rind is supple, with a slightly bitter flavor.
