= Canton of Saint-Affrique =

Coordinates: 43.96°N 2.89°E

- Canton
- Situation of the canton of Saint-Affrique in the department of Aveyron
- Country: France
- Region: Occitania
- Department: Aveyron
- No. of communes: {{{nbcomm}}}
- Population (2023): 12,459
- INSEE code: 1219

The canton of Saint-Affrique is an administrative division of the Aveyron department, southern France. Its borders were not modified at the French canton reorganisation which came into effect in March 2015. Its seat is in Saint-Affrique.

It consists of the following communes:

1. La Bastide-Pradines
2. Calmels-et-le-Viala
3. Roquefort-sur-Soulzon
4. Saint-Affrique
5. Saint-Félix-de-Sorgues
6. Saint-Izaire
7. Saint-Jean-d'Alcapiès
8. Saint-Rome-de-Cernon
9. Tournemire
10. Vabres-l'Abbaye
11. Versols-et-Lapeyre
