= Roquefort =

French blue cheese

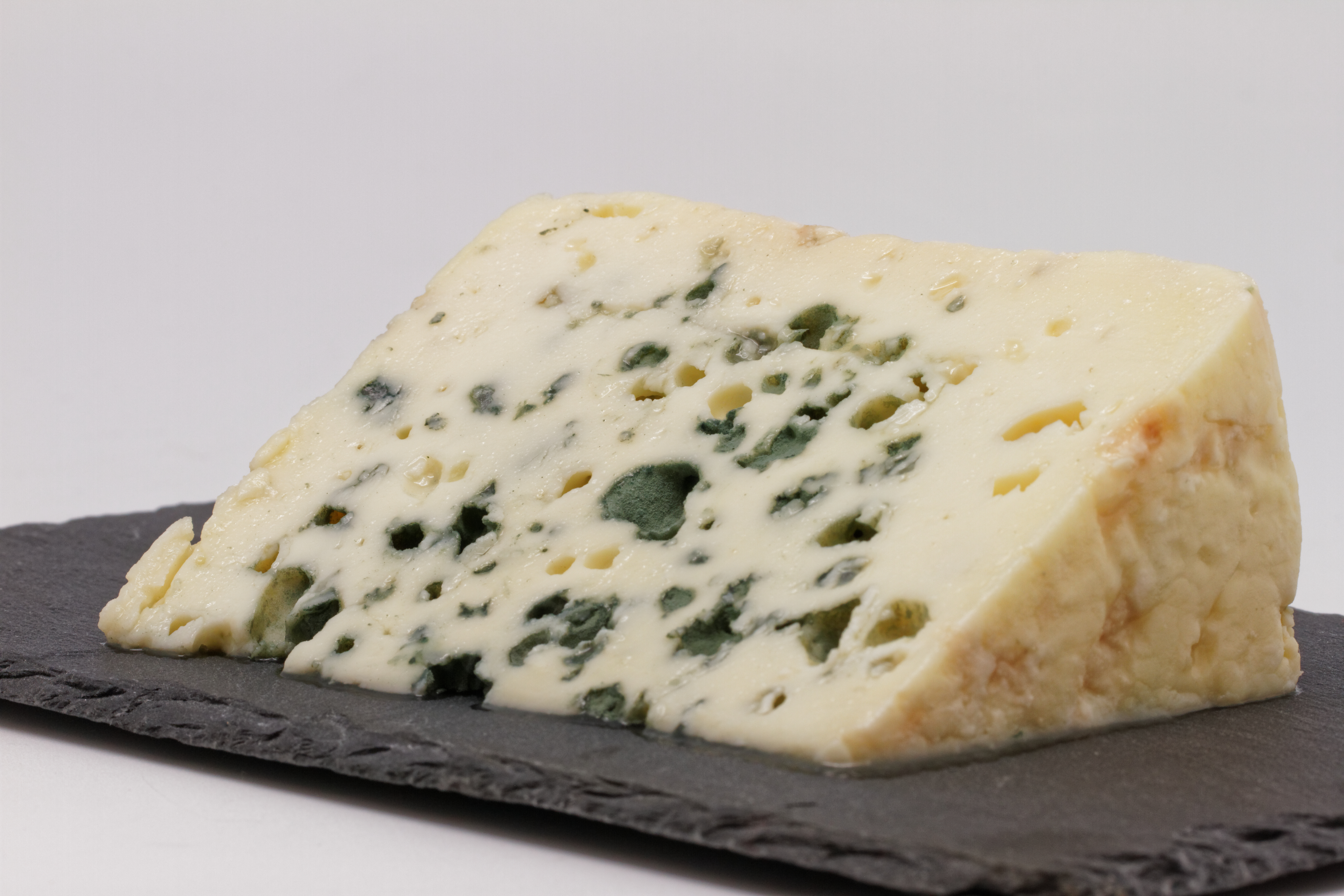
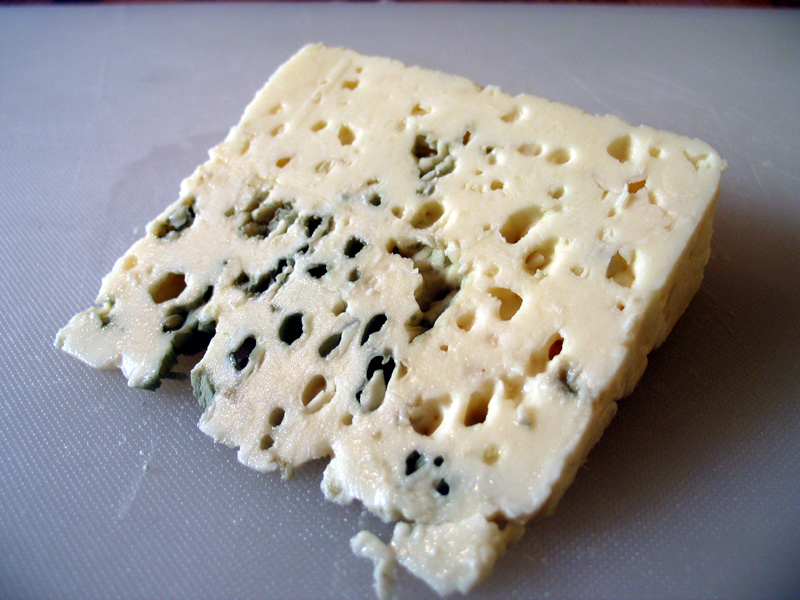
- Roquefort Texture of Roquefort
- Country of origin: France
- Region: Aveyron
- Town: Roquefort-sur-Soulzon
- Source of milk: Ewe (sheep)
- Pasteurised: No
- Texture: Semi-hard
- Aging time: 5 months
- Certification: AOC: 1925
- Named after: Roquefort-sur-Soulzon

Roquefort (French pronunciation: [ʁɔkfɔʁ]; Languedocien: Ròcafòrt) is a sheep-milk blue cheese from southern France. EU law dictates that only those cheeses aged in the natural Combalou caves of Roquefort-sur-Soulzon (in the Occitania region) may bear the name "Roquefort", as it is a recognised geographical indication and has a protected designation of origin.

Roquefort is white, tangy, creamy and slightly moist, with veins of blue mold. It has a characteristic fragrance and flavor with a taste of butyric acid; the blue veins provide a sharp tang. It has no rind; the exterior is edible and slightly salty. A typical wheel weighs between 2.5 and 3 kg (5.5 and 6.6 lb), and is about 10 cm (4 in) thick. Each kilogram of finished cheese requires about 4.5 liters of milk to produce. In France, Roquefort is often called the "king of cheeses" (French: roi des fromages) or the "cheese of kings", although those names also apply to other cheeses.

== History ==
According to legend, Roquefort cheese was discovered when a shepherd, eating his lunch of bread and ewes' milk cheese, saw a beautiful girl in the distance. Abandoning his meal in a nearby cave, he ran to meet her. When he returned a few months later, the mold (Penicillium roqueforti) had transformed his plain cheese into Roquefort.

In AD 79, Pliny the Elder praised the cheeses of Lozère and Gévaudan and reported their popularity in ancient Rome; in 1737, Jean Astruc suggested that this was a reference to an ancestor of Roquefort. The theory was widely taken up and by the 1860s was being promoted by the Société des Caves. Others have dismissed the idea, on the grounds that Pliny does not clearly identify a blue cheese. There is no clear consensus on the meaning of Pliny's description—it has been variously interpreted as a reference to fromage frais, cheese pickled in grape-juice, and even fondue, as well as a reference to Roquefort.

By the middle ages, Roquefort had become a recognized cheese. On 4 June 1411, Charles VI granted a monopoly for the ripening of the cheese to the people of Roquefort-sur-Soulzon as they had been doing for centuries.

By 1820, Roquefort was producing 300 tonnes a year, a figure that steadily increased throughout the next century so that by 1914 it was 9,250.

In 1925, the cheese was the recipient of France's first Appellation d'Origine Contrôlée when regulations controlling its production and naming were first implemented. In 1961, in a landmark ruling that outlawed imitation, the Tribunal de Grande Instance at Millau decreed that, although the method for the manufacture of the cheese could be followed across the south of France, only those cheeses whose ripening occurred in the natural caves of Mont Combalou in Roquefort-sur-Soulzon were permitted to bear the name Roquefort.

== Production ==
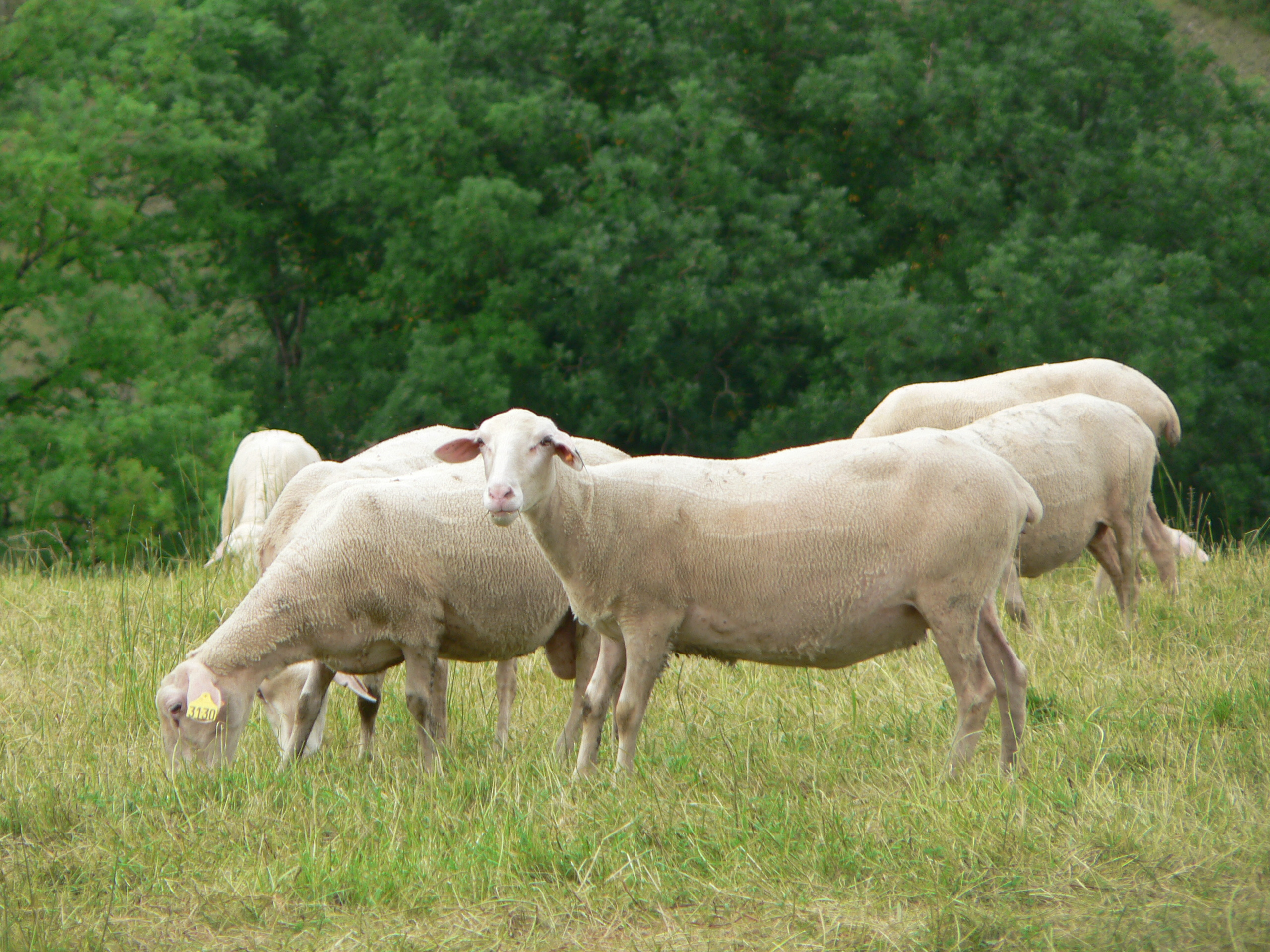
A Lacaune flock in France

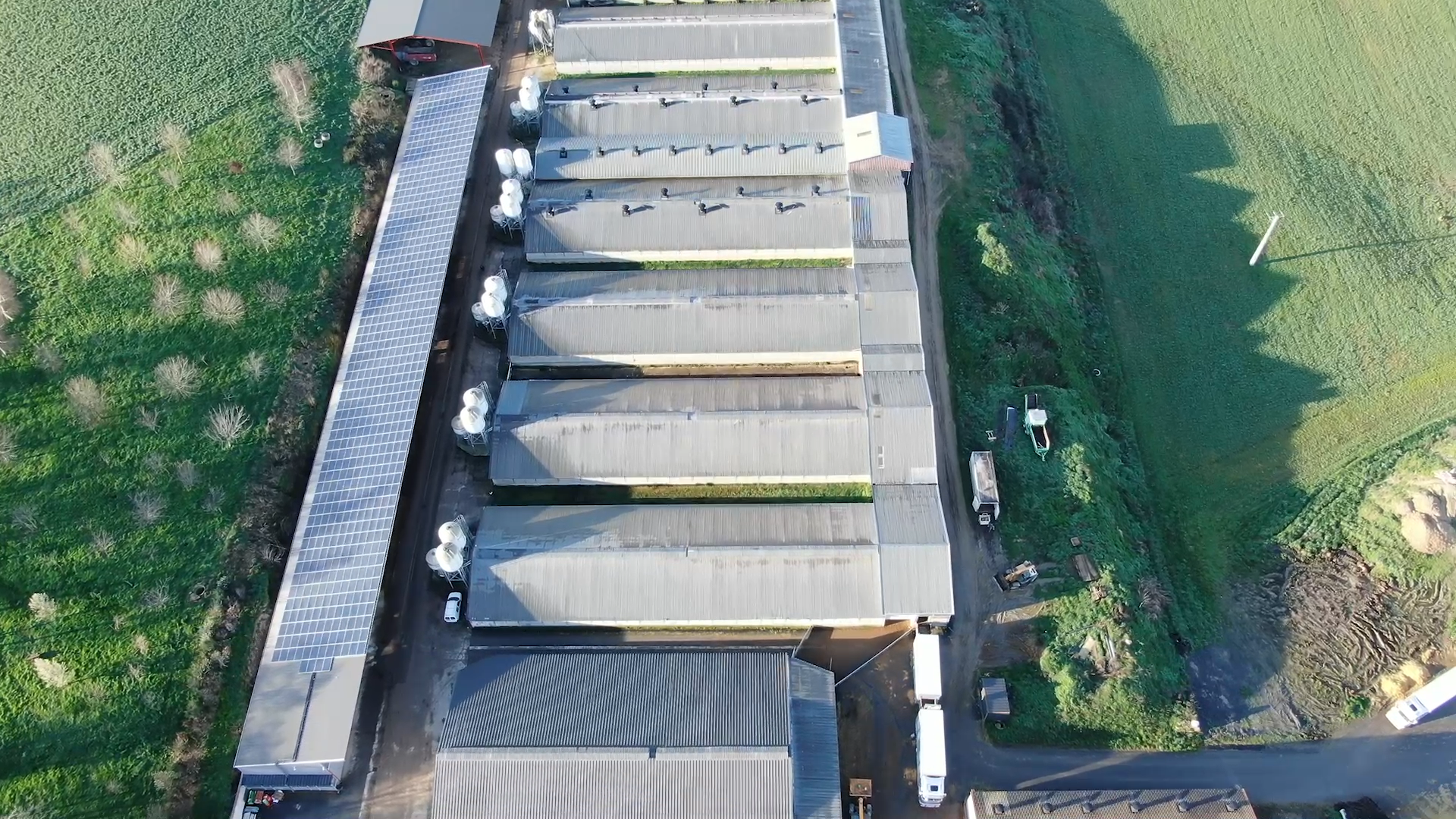
A Roquefort farm in Southern France

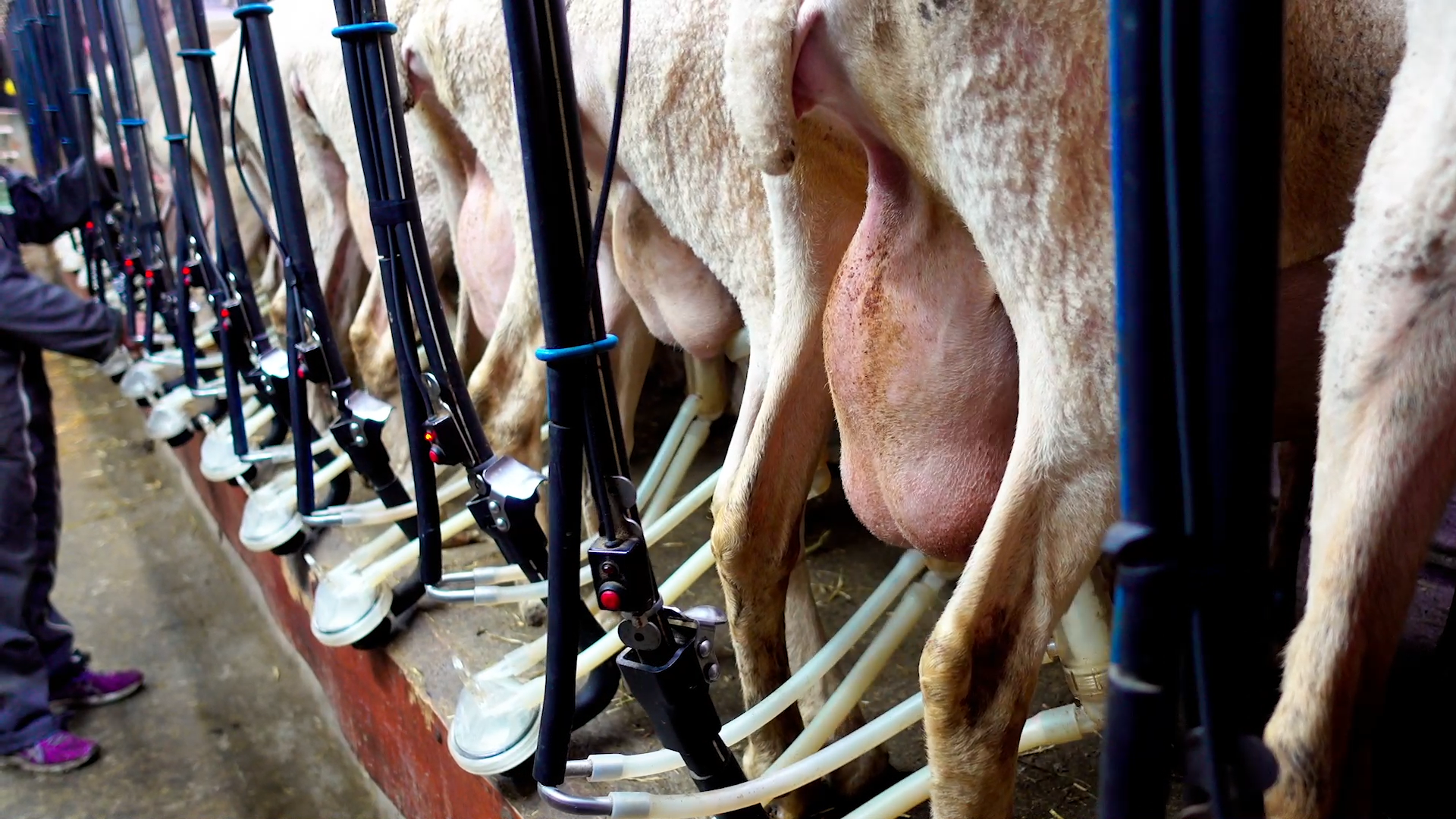
Sheep being milked for Roquefort production

Roquefort is made entirely from the milk of the Lacaune breed of sheep. Prior to the Appellation d'Origine Contrôlée (AOC) regulations of 1925, a small amount of cow's or goat's milk was sometimes added. Around 4.5 L (1 1/4 US gal) of milk is required to make one kilogram (2.2 lb) of Roquefort.

Roquefort is produced throughout the département of Aveyron and part of the nearby départements of Aude, Lozère, Gard, Hérault and Tarn. As of 2009, there are seven Roquefort producers. The largest-volume brand by far is Roquefort Société made by the Société des Caves de Roquefort, since 1990 a subsidiary of Lactalis. Other producers are Papillon, Carles, Gabriel Coulet, Fromageries occitanes, Vernières and Le Vieux Berger.

Around three million cheese wheels are made annually (10,000 tonnes) making it, after Comté, France's second-most-popular cheese. Roquefort has a high content of free glutamate, 1,280 mg per 100 g of cheese.

The regional cuisine in and around Aveyron includes many Roquefort-based recipes for main-course meat sauces, savory tarts and quiches, pies, and fillings.

=== AOC regulations ===
The Appellation d'origine contrôlée regulations that govern the production of Roquefort have been laid down over a number of decrees by the INAO. These include:

1. All milk used must be delivered at least 20 days after lambing has taken place.
2. The sheep must be on pasture, whenever possible, in an area that includes most of Aveyron and parts of neighboring departments. At least 75% of any grain or fodder fed must come from the area.
3. The milk must be whole, raw (not heated above 34 °C [93 °F]), and unfiltered except to remove macroscopic particles.
4. The addition of rennet must occur within 48 hours of milking.
5. The Penicillium roqueforti used in the production must be produced in France from the natural caves of Roquefort-sur-Soulzon.
6. The salting process must be performed using dry salt.
7. The whole process of maturation, cutting, packaging and refrigeration of the cheese must take place in the commune of Roquefort-sur-Soulzon.

== Health benefits ==
Penicillium roqueforti does not produce penicillin. However, due to the presence of other anti-inflammatory proteins, it was common in country districts for shepherds to apply this cheese to wounds to avoid gangrene.

The presence of anti-inflammatory compounds was confirmed by a 2012 study. A study from 2013 found that proteins from Roquefort cheese inhibit chlamydia propagation and lipopolysaccharide (LPS) leukocyte migration.

== See also ==
- List of French cheeses
- List of cheeses
- Stilton
