= Calmels-et-le-Viala =

Commune in Occitanie, France

- Commune
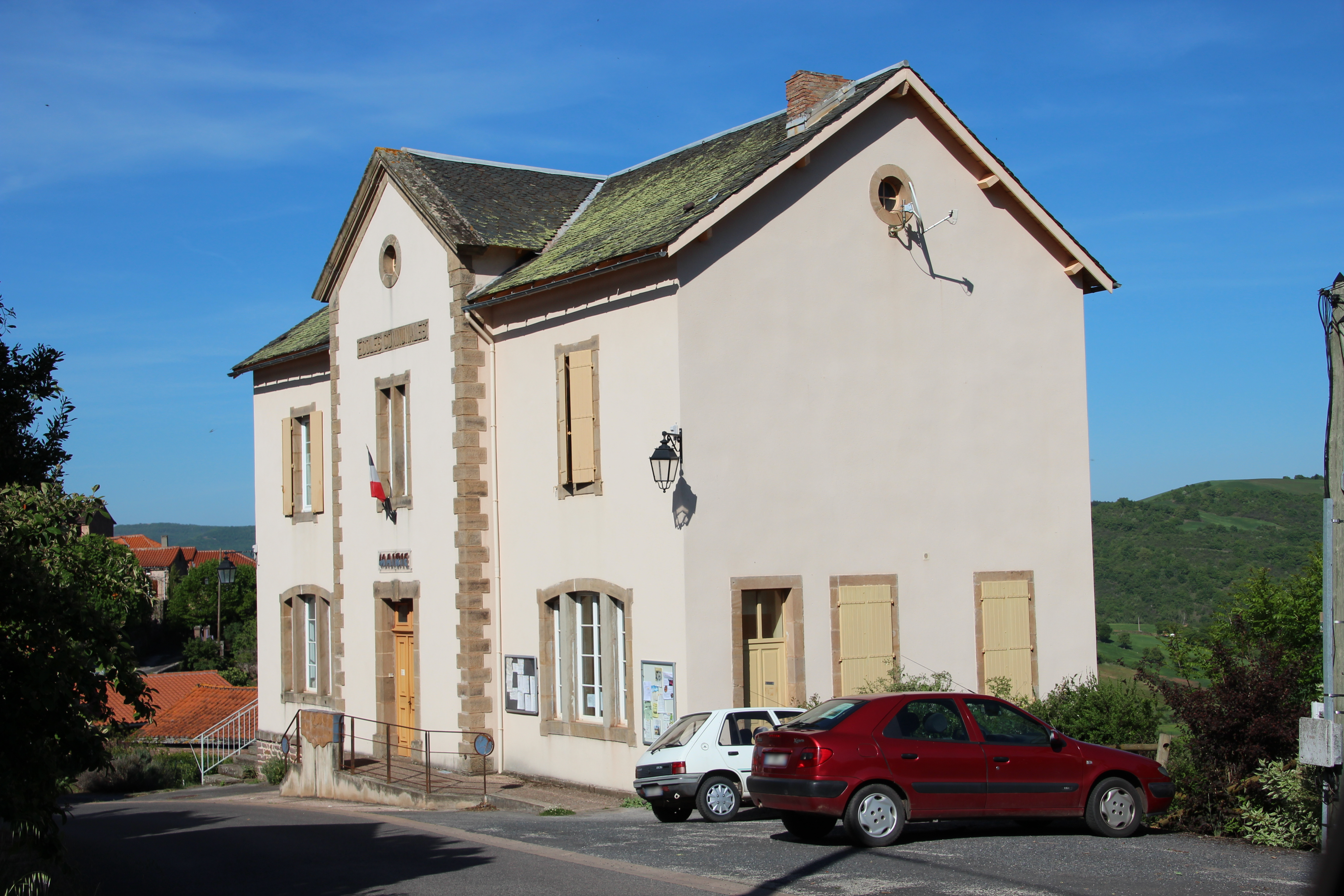
- The town hall in Calmels-et-le-Viala
- Location of Calmels-et-le-Viala
- Location within France Location within Occitanie
- Coordinates: 43°56′48″N 2°45′11″E
- Country: France
- Region: Occitania
- Department: Aveyron
- Arrondissement: Millau
- Canton: Saint-Affrique

Government
  - Mayor (2020–2026): Anne-Marie Constans
- Area^{1}: 23.20 km^{2} (8.96 sq mi)
- Elevation: 350 m (1,150 ft)
- Highest elevation: 574 m (1,883 ft)
- Lowest elevation: 269 m (883 ft)
- Population (2023): 182
  - Density: 7.84/km^{2} (20.3/sq mi)
- Time zone: UTC+01:00 (CET)
  - Summer (DST): UTC+02:00 (CEST)
- INSEE/Postal code: 12042 /12400
- ^{1} French Land Register data, which excludes lakes, ponds, glaciers > 1 km^{2} (0.386 sq mi or 247 acres) and river estuaries.

Calmels-et-le-Viala (French pronunciation: [kalmɛl e lə vjala]; Occitan: Caumèls e Lo Vialar) is a commune in the Aveyron department in southern France.

== Geography ==
The commune is traversed by the Dourdou de Camarès River.

== Population ==
Historical population
Year	Pop.	±% p.a.
1968	303	—
1975	239	−3.33%
1982	211	−1.76%
1990	214	+0.18%
1999	207	−0.37%
2007	236	+1.65%
2012	223	−1.13%
2017	208	−1.38%
2023	182	−2.20%
Source: INSEE

== See also ==
- Communes of the Aveyron department
