= Saint Africus =

- Born: c. 7th century France
- Died: c. 7th century France
- Venerated in: Roman Catholic Church; Eastern Orthodox Church; Anglican Communion
- Feast: November 16

Saint Africus was a 7th-century French Roman Catholic saint about whom very little is known. He was a bishop of Comminges in southern France (Haute-Garonne), celebrated for his zeal for orthodoxy.

His 7th-century shrine was destroyed by Calvinists. His feast day is celebrated November 16. His tomb was in the town of Saint-Affrique.

== Sources ==
- St Africus
