= Saint-Jean-d'Alcapiès =

Commune in Occitanie, France

- Commune
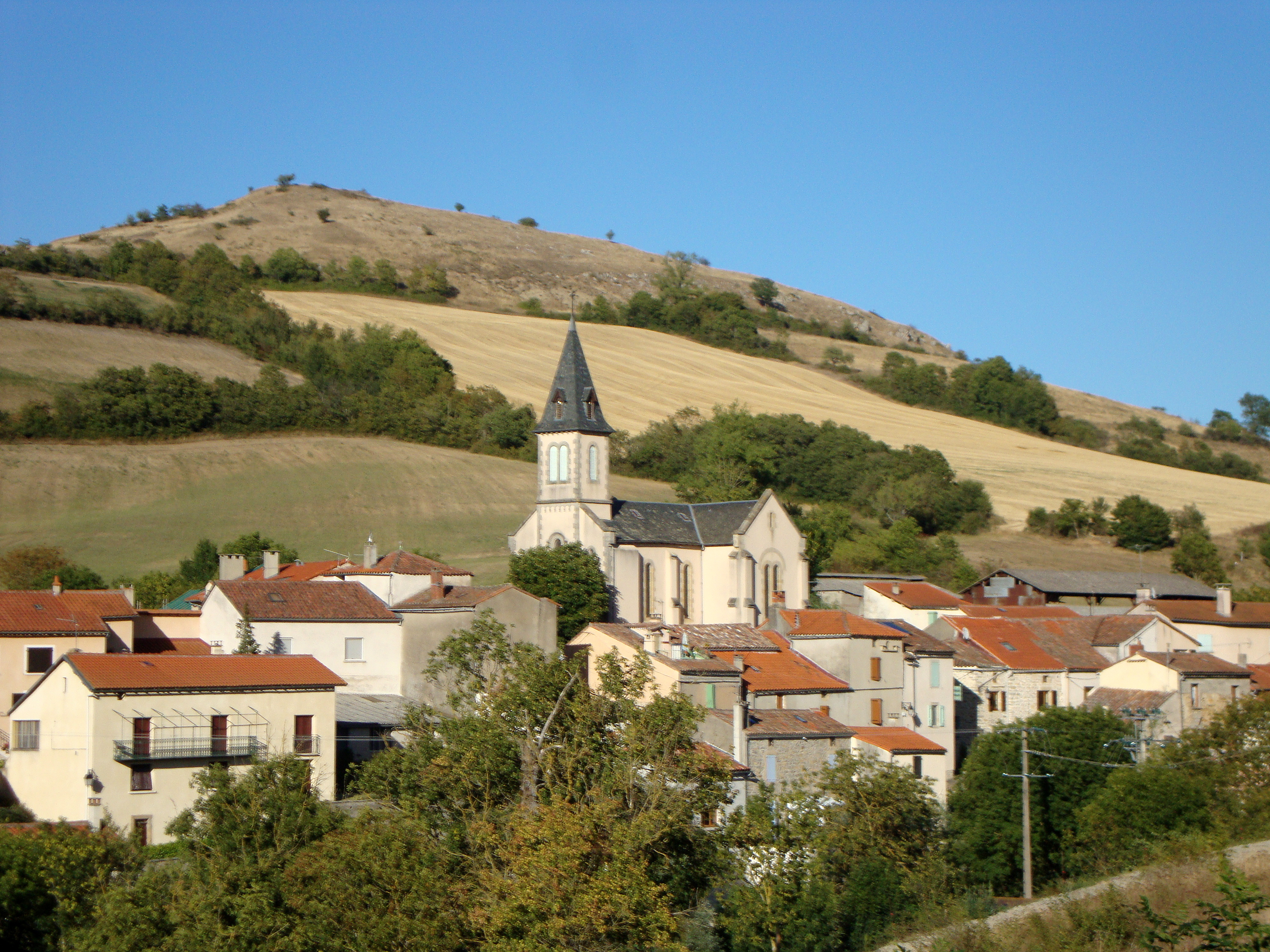
- The church and surrounding buildings in Saint-Jean-d'Alcapiès
- Location of Saint-Jean-d'Alcapiès
- Location within France Location within Occitanie
- Coordinates: 43°57′08″N 2°58′37″E
- Country: France
- Region: Occitania
- Department: Aveyron
- Arrondissement: Millau
- Canton: Saint-Affrique

Government
  - Mayor (2020–2026): Jean-Luc Taillefer
- Area^{1}: 8.62 km^{2} (3.33 sq mi)
- Highest elevation: 689 m (2,260 ft)
- Lowest elevation: 422 m (1,385 ft)
- Population (2023): 219
  - Density: 25.4/km^{2} (65.8/sq mi)
- Time zone: UTC+01:00 (CET)
  - Summer (DST): UTC+02:00 (CEST)
- INSEE/Postal code: 12229 /12250
- ^{1} French Land Register data, which excludes lakes, ponds, glaciers > 1 km^{2} (0.386 sq mi or 247 acres) and river estuaries.

Saint-Jean-d'Alcapiès (French pronunciation: [sɛ̃ ʒɑ̃ dalkapjɛs]; Languedocien: Sent Joan d'Aucàpias) is a commune in the Aveyron department in southern France.

== Population ==
Historical population
Year	Pop.	±% p.a.
1968	139	—
1975	118	−2.31%
1982	110	−1.00%
1990	133	+2.40%
1999	163	+2.29%
2007	255	+5.75%
2012	258	+0.23%
2017	255	−0.23%
2023	219	−2.50%
Source: INSEE

== See also ==
- Communes of the Aveyron department
