= Tournemire, Aveyron =

Commune in Occitanie, France

Tournemire
- Commune
- Location of Tournemire
- Location within France Location within Occitanie
- Coordinates: 43°58′12″N 3°01′13″E
- Country: France
- Region: Occitania
- Department: Aveyron
- Arrondissement: Millau
- Canton: Saint-Affrique

Government
  - Mayor (2020–2026): Pascal Rivier
- Area^{1}: 8.91 km^{2} (3.44 sq mi)
- Elevation: 498 m (1,634 ft)
- Highest elevation: 856 m (2,808 ft)
- Lowest elevation: 490 m (1,610 ft)
- Population (2023): 413
  - Density: 46.4/km^{2} (120/sq mi)
- Time zone: UTC+01:00 (CET)
  - Summer (DST): UTC+02:00 (CEST)
- INSEE/Postal code: 12282 /12250
- ^{1} French Land Register data, which excludes lakes, ponds, glaciers > 1 km^{2} (0.386 sq mi or 247 acres) and river estuaries.

Tournemire (French pronunciation: [tuʁnəmiʁ]; Occitan: Tornamira) is a commune in the Aveyron department in southern France.

== Population ==
Historical population
Year	Pop.	±% p.a.
1968	645	—
1975	521	−3.00%
1982	473	−1.37%
1990	474	+0.03%
1999	416	−1.44%
2007	459	+1.24%
2012	387	−3.35%
2017	427	+1.99%
2023	413	−0.55%
Source: INSEE

== See also ==
- Communes of the Aveyron department
