= Saint-Rome-de-Cernon =

Commune in Occitanie, France

- Commune
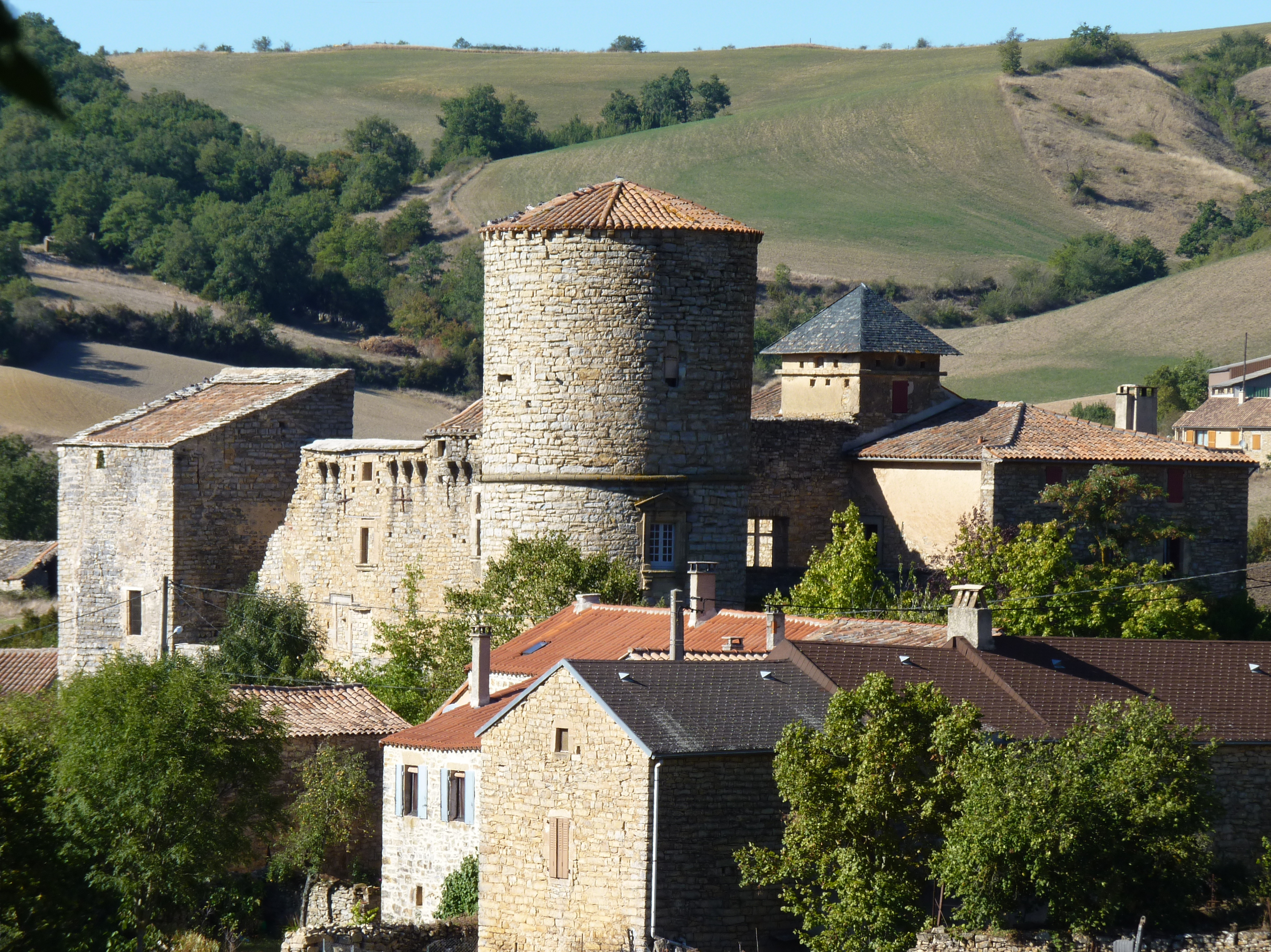
- Chateau of Mélac

- Coat of arms
- Location of Saint-Rome-de-Cernon
- Location within France Location within Occitanie
- Coordinates: 44°00′46″N 2°57′51″E
- Country: France
- Region: Occitania
- Department: Aveyron
- Arrondissement: Millau
- Canton: Saint-Affrique

Government
  - Mayor (2020–2026): Pierre Pantanella
- Area^{1}: 37.88 km^{2} (14.63 sq mi)
- Highest elevation: 856 m (2,808 ft)
- Lowest elevation: 374 m (1,227 ft)
- Population (2023): 963
  - Density: 25.4/km^{2} (65.8/sq mi)
- Time zone: UTC+01:00 (CET)
  - Summer (DST): UTC+02:00 (CEST)
- INSEE/Postal code: 12243 /12490
- ^{1} French Land Register data, which excludes lakes, ponds, glaciers > 1 km^{2} (0.386 sq mi or 247 acres) and river estuaries.

Saint-Rome-de-Cernon (French pronunciation: [sɛ̃ ʁɔm də sɛʁnɔ̃]; Occitan: Sent Roma de Sarnon) is a commune in the Aveyron department in southern France.

== Population ==
Historical population
Year	Pop.	±% p.a.
1968	759	—
1975	841	+1.48%
1982	878	+0.62%
1990	871	−0.10%
1999	794	−1.02%
2007	754	−0.64%
2012	806	+1.34%
2017	925	+2.79%
2023	963	+0.67%
Source: INSEE

== See also ==
- Communes of the Aveyron department
