= Saint-Affrique =

Commune in Occitanie, France

- Commune
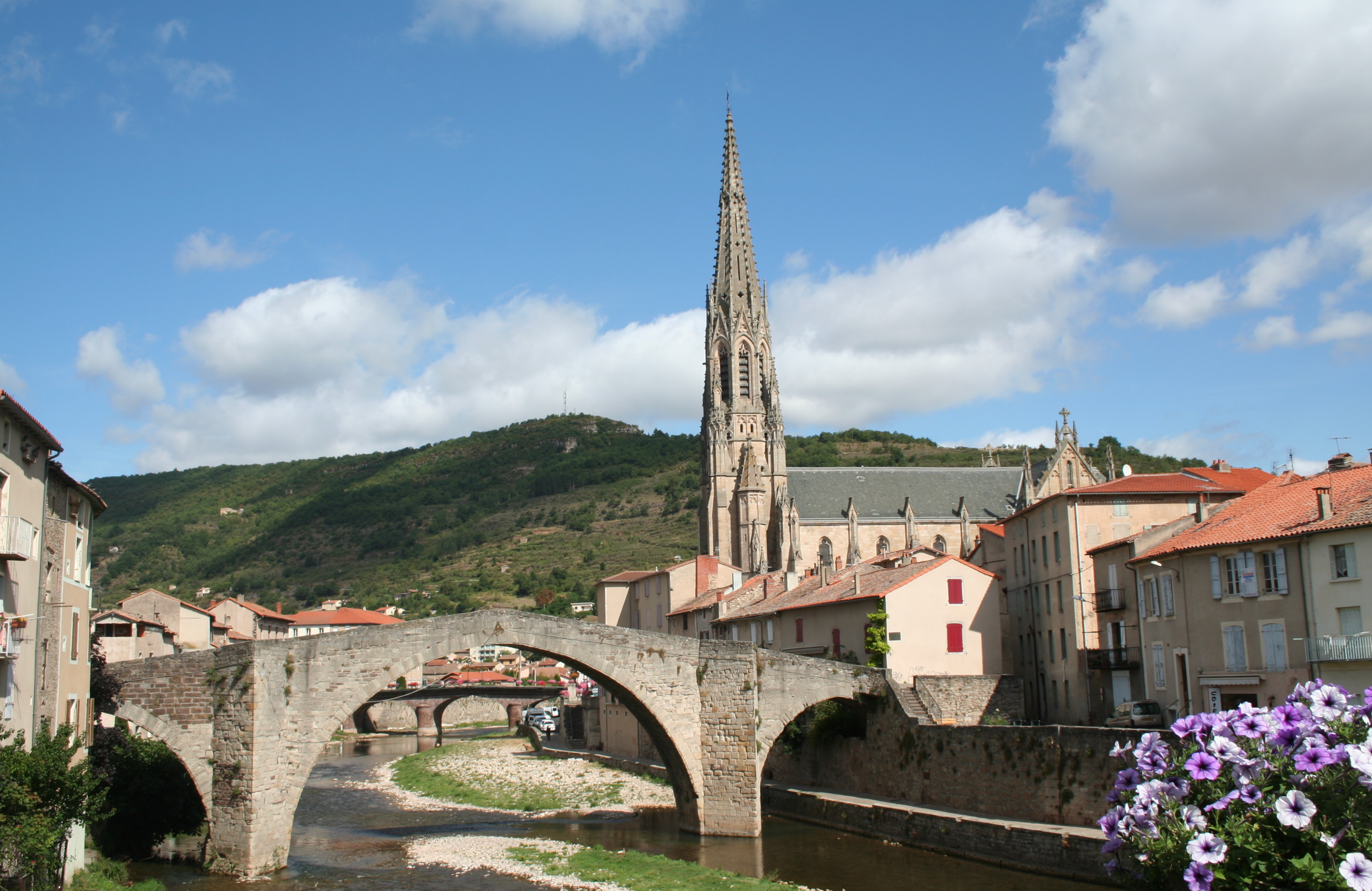
- The bridge and church in Saint-Affrique

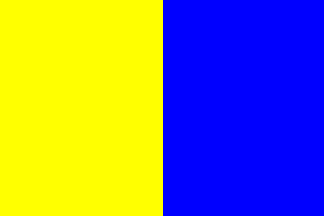
- Flag Coat of arms
- Location of Saint-Affrique
- Location within France Location within Occitanie
- Coordinates: 43°57′33″N 2°53′14″E
- Country: France
- Region: Occitania
- Department: Aveyron
- Arrondissement: Millau
- Canton: Saint-Affrique

Government
  - Mayor (2021–2026): Sébastien David
- Area^{1}: 110.96 km^{2} (42.84 sq mi)
- Elevation: 330 m (1,080 ft)
- Highest elevation: 720 m (2,360 ft)
- Lowest elevation: 279 m (915 ft)
- Population (2023): 7,941
  - Density: 71.57/km^{2} (185.4/sq mi)
- Time zone: UTC+01:00 (CET)
  - Summer (DST): UTC+02:00 (CEST)
- INSEE/Postal code: 12208 /12400
- ^{1} French Land Register data, which excludes lakes, ponds, glaciers > 1 km^{2} (0.386 sq mi or 247 acres) and river estuaries.

Saint-Affrique (French: [sɛ̃t‿afʁik]; Languedocien: Sant Africa) is a commune in the Aveyron department in Southern France.

== History ==
Saint-Affrique grew in the 6th century around the tomb of Saint Africus, bishop of Comminges. In the 12th century a fortress was built on the neighboring rock of Caylus. The possession of Saint-Affrique was vigorously contested during the French Wars of Religion. It was eventually occupied by the Huguenots until 1629, when it was seized and dismantled by a royal army.

== Geography ==
The Sorgues, a tributary of the Dourdou de Camarès, flows through the commune and crosses the town. The Dourdou de Camarès flows northwestward through the western part of the commune and forms part of its northwestern border.

== Population ==
Historical population

Year	Pop.	±% p.a.
1793	3,578	—
1800	4,616	+3.71%
1806	5,348	+2.48%
1821	6,008	+0.78%
1831	6,336	+0.53%
1836	6,421	+0.27%
1841	6,208	−0.67%
1846	6,760	+1.72%
1851	6,618	−0.42%
1856	6,760	+0.43%
1861	6,807	+0.14%
1866	7,046	+0.69%
1872	7,214	+0.39%
1876	7,622	+1.38%
1881	7,598	−0.06%
1886	7,177	−1.13%
1891	7,223	+0.13%
1896	7,026	−0.55%
1901	6,699	−0.95%

Year	Pop.	±% p.a.
1906	6,571	−0.39%
1911	6,495	−0.23%
1921	6,211	−0.45%
1926	6,181	−0.10%
1931	6,592	+1.30%
1936	6,881	+0.86%
1946	7,455	+0.80%
1954	7,236	−0.37%
1962	7,142	−0.16%
1968	7,674	+1.20%
1975	8,223	+0.99%
1982	8,475	+0.43%
1990	7,798	−1.04%
1999	7,507	−0.42%
2007	8,067	+0.90%
2012	8,255	+0.46%
2017	8,089	−0.41%
2023	7,941	−0.31%

Source: EHESS and INSEE (1968-2023)

== Sights ==
An old bridge over the Sorgue and some megaliths in the neighborhood, especially, the dolmen of Tiergues, are of antiquarian interest.

== Personalities ==
Saint-Affrique was the birthplace of:

- Pierre Frédéric Sarrus (1798–1861), mathematician
- Lucien Galtier (1812–1866), priest who built the first Catholic Church in Minnesota, USA
- Pierre-Auguste Sarrus (1813–1876), musician and inventor
- Noël Édouard, vicomte de Curières de Castelnau (1851-1944) General
- Émile Borel (1871–1956), mathematician and politician
- Stéphane Diagana (born 1969), athlete
- Richard Sainct (born 1970), motorcycle racer

== Saint-Affrique prize ==
The Grand Prix of Saint-Affrique has been awarded to noted Parisian painters since the second part of the 20th century. It consists of a month-long stay of at the hotel of famous chef François Decucq during which the painters could visit and paint one of the most beautiful counties in France. Some prize winners: Daniel du Janerand, Maurice Boitel.

== International relations ==
- The town is twinned with Driffield, in the East Riding of Yorkshire, England.

== See also ==
- List of European art awards
- List of medieval bridges in France
- Communes of the Aveyron department
- Cazelle de Saint Affrique
