= List of lord mayors of York =

Lord Mayor of York
- Coat of arms of the City of York
- Incumbent; Margaret Wells since 21 May 2026
- Style: The Right Honourable ex officio
- Residence: Mansion House
- Appointer: City of York Council
- Term length: One year
- Inaugural holder: Hugh de Selby (as Mayor); William de Selby (as Lord Mayor)
- Formation: 1217 (as Mayor); 1389 (as Lord Mayor)
- Website: City of York Council

The Lord Mayor of York is the chairman of City of York Council, first citizen and civic head of York. The appointment is made by the council each year in May, at the same time appointing a sheriff, the city's other civic head. York's lord mayor is second only to the Lord Mayor of London in precedence. The office of mayor dates back to at least 1217 and was upgraded by Richard II to that of Lord Mayor in 1389.

The Mansion House, York, is the Lord Mayor's working residence during the mayor's term of office.

The use of the prefix "right honourable" appears to have been used since the creation of the lord mayoralty. It was confirmed by letters patent dated 1 April 1974, when York became a non-metropolitan district and reconfirmed by letters patent dated 1 April 1996, when it became a unitary authority.

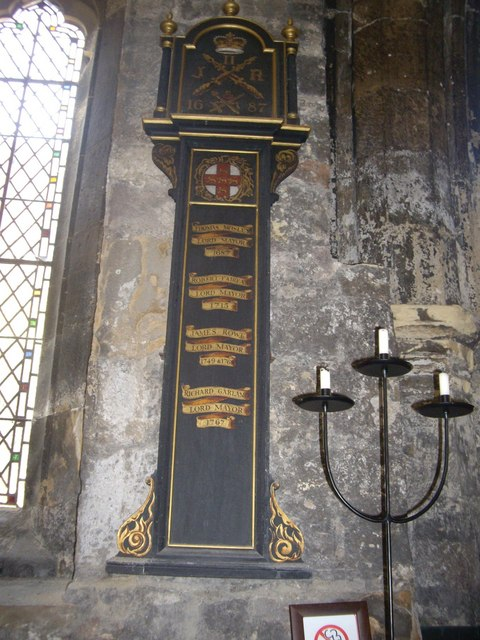
Wall plaque in Holy Trinity Church commemorating past lord mayors Thomas Mosley 1687, Robert Fairfax 1715, James Rowe 1749 & 1768 and Richard Garland 1767

In 1212, King John granted York the right to collect its own taxes, hold courts and conduct its own affairs and thereby the right to elect a mayor. These rights were temporarily forfeited in 1280–1282 for altering a royal charter, in 1292–1297 for failing to pay taxes and in 1405–1406 for supporting Archbishop Richard Scrope in the 1405 Northern Rising. In 1389, King Richard II elevated the mayor to the status of lord mayor and supposedly gave his sword to be carried point upwards before him.

== List of Mayors of York ==
Source: "Eboracum"

=== Before 1300 ===
Year	Name	Notes
1217	Hugh de Selby	
c.1219	Thomas Palmer	
1222	Adam Flur	
c.1224	H. de Ebor	
c.1225	Hendy de Seizevaux	or de Sexdecim Vallibus
1226	Hugh de Selby	
1229–1230	Hugh de Selby	
1235–1236	Hugh de Selby	
c.1246	Nicholas Orgar	
c.1248	‘Domino J.’	(John de Selby?)
1249	Nicholas Orgar	
1250	‘Domino J.’	(John de Selby?)
1251–1253	John de Selby	
1255–1256	Gacio de Calvo Monte	or Chaumont
1258	Mark de Northfolke	
1259–1260	Adam le Cerf	
1260	Adam le Cerf	
1264	John de Selby	
1266	John de Selby	
1267	-	
1268	John de Selby	
1271	Walter de Stokes or Adam le Cerf	
1273	John le Specer Snr	
1274	John le Specer	
1274–1277	Robert de Bromholme	
1278	Walter de Stokes (24 June) & Sir Gilbert de Luda	
1279	Richard de Romundby	
1280	John Sampson	
1281	City governed by the King's men	
1282	Sir Gilbert de Luda & John Sampson	
1283	John Sampson	
1284	Sir Gilbert de Luda	
1285	John Sampson	
1286–1289	Nicholas de Selby	MP for York, 1294
1290	Roger Basy	MP for York, 1294
1293–1294	City governed by the King's men	
1295	Robert de Bromholme	
1296	City governed by the King's men	
1297	Nicholas De Langton Snr	
1298	James le Flemyng	
1299	John Sampson	

=== 14th century ===
Year	Name	Notes
1300	John Sampson	
1301–1304	John le Specer Jnr	
1305	Andrew de Bolingbroke	MP for York, 1299
1306	Nicholas de Langton Snr	
1307–1308	John de Askham	
1309	Robert le Meke	
1310	Andrew de Bolingbrok	
1311–1316	Nicholas le Flemyng	son of James le Flemyng, killed at the Battle of Myton
1317	Robert le Meke	
1318	Thomas de Redness	
1319	Nicholas le Flemyng	
1320–1321	Robert le Meke	
1322–1333	Nicholas de Langton	son of Nicholas de Langton Snr
1334–1337	Henry de Belton	
1338	Nicholas de Langton	
1339	Henry de Belton	
1340–1342	Nicholas de Langton	
1343	Nicholas Foukes	
1344–1346	John de Shirburn	
1347	Henry le Goldbeter	
1348–1352	Henry de Scoreby	
1353–1361	John de Langton	
1364	John de Acastre	
1365	Richard de Wateby	
1366	Roger de Hovingham	
1367	William Graa	
1368	Robert de Howme	
1369	William Savage	
1370	Roger de Selby	
1371–1372	John de Gisburn	
1373	Roger de Moreton Jnr	
1374	Thomas de Howme	
1375	Thomas Graa	MP for York, 1377–1397
1376	Ralphe de Hornby	
1377	John de Sancton	
1378	John de Barden	
1379	John de Acastre	
1380	John de Gisburn	Forcibly deposed
1381–1383	Simon de Quixley	
1384	Robert Savage	MP for York, 1383,1386
1385	William de Selby	MP for York, 1383–1397
1386	John de Howden	MP for York, 1384–1391
1387	John de Selby	
1388	William de Selby	MP for York, 1383–1397

== List of Lord Mayors of York ==
Year	Name	Notes
1389	William de Selby	First to use ceremonial sword.
1390–1391	Thomas Smyth	
1392–1393	Robert Savage	1393 first to use ceremonial mace. MP for York, 1383, 1386
1394	Thomas de Stayveley	
1395	William de Helmsley	MP for York, 1393
1396	Thomas de Stayveley	
1397	Sir William Frost	MP for York, 1399
1398	Thomas Graa	MP for York, 1377–1397
1399	Robert de Talkan	MP for York, 1402,1407

=== 15th century ===
Year	Name	Notes
1400–1404	Sir Willam Frost	MP for York, 1399
1405	Adam del Bank	
1406	Sir William Frost	MP for York, 1399
1407–1409	Henry Wyman	
1410	John de Bolton	MP for York, 1399,1407
1411	John de Craven	
1412	Robert Howme	Merchant.
1413	Nicholas Blackburn Snr	Mercer.
1414	Thomas de Sancton	MP for York, 1413,1417
1415	William de Alne	Merchant.
1416	John de Northeby	Merchant.
1417	William Bowes Snr	Merchant, and MP for York, 1413,1417
1418	John de Moreton	MP for York, 1415, 1421
1419	John de Bedale	
1420	Thomas del Gare	MP for York, 1419,1421
1421	Richard Russell	Merchant, and MP for York, 1415,1422,1425
1422	Henry Preston	MP for York, 1420
1423	Thomas Esingwald	Merchant.
1424	Thomas Bracebridge	Merchant.
1425	William Ormeshede	Merchant, and MP for York, 1421,1426,1431
1426	Peter Buckey	
1427	John Alstonmore	Merchant.
1428	William Bowes Snr	MP for York, 1413,1417
1429	Nicholas Blackburn Jnr	
1430	Richard Russell	MP for York, 1415,1422,1425
1431	John Bolton	Merchant.
1432	Thomas Snawden	Pewterer.
1433	William Ormeshede	MP for York, 1421,1426,1431
1434	Thomas del Gare Jnr	
1435	Thomas Kirkham	
1436	Richard Wartre	Merchant.
1437	William Bedale	Merchant.
1438	William Useflete	Merchant.
1439	Thomas Ridelay	
1440	William Girlington	Draper.
1441	Thomas Kirke	Mercer.
1442	John Thriske	Merchant, mayor of the staple.
1443	William Bowes	Merchant.
1444	Richard Buckden	Merchant.
1445	Thomas Crathorne	
1446	William Stockton	
1447	John Crosyer	
1448	John Carre	
1449	William Holbeek	Merchant of the staple.
1450	Thomas Barton	Grocer.
1451	Richard Wartre	First year of the reign of Henry VI.
1452	Thomas Danby	Merchant.
1453	John Catryk	
1454	Thomas Neleson	Merchant.
1455	Richard Lematon	
1456	John Carre	
1457	Robert Collinson	Merchant.
1458	William Holbeck	
1459	Nicholas Holgate	
1460	Thomas Beverley	Merchant of the Staple
1461	William Stockton	First year of the reign of Edward IV.
1462	John Thrisk	
1463	Thomas Scawsby	
1464	John Gilliot	Knight of the Bath.
1465	Thomas Neleson	
1466	John Kent	Merchant.
1467	John Marshall	Merchant.
1468	William Snawsell	Goldsmith
1469	Sir Richard Yorke	Merchant of the Staple.
1470	William Holbeck	
1471	Thomas Beverley	
1472	William Holbeck	
1473	Christopher Marshall	
1474	Sir John Gilliot	
1475	William Lame	
1476	Thomas Wrangwish	
1477	John Tong	
1478	John Ferriby	Merchant.
1479	William Welles	
1480	John Marshall	
1481	Robert Amyas	
1482	Richard Yorke	Mayor of the Staple
1483	John Newton	Dyer. First year of the reign of Richard III
1484	Thomas Wrangwith	Merchant.
1485	Nicholas Lancaster	LL. D. First year of the reign of Henry VII
1486	William Chimney	Draper.
1487	Sir William Todd	Merchant.
1488	Robert Hancock	Grocer.
1489	John Harper	Merchant.
1490	Sir John Gilliot	Merchant.
1491	John Ferriby died and replaced by William White	
1492	Thomas Scotton	Merchant.
1493	Nicholas Lancaster	Merchant.
1494	Michael White	dyer
1495	George Kirke	Merchant.
1496	Robert Johnson	Grocer.
1497	Thomas Gray	Goldsmith.
1498	John Metcalfe	Merchant.
1499	John Elwald	Merchant.

=== 16th century ===
Year	Name	Notes
1500–1501	William Nelson	Merchant, and MP for York, 1504,1510,1512,1515
1501–1502	John Stockdale	Merchant.
1502–1503	Richard Thornton	Grocer.
1503–1504	Sir John Gilliot	Merchant.
1504–1505	Thomas Jameson	Merchant.
1505–1506	William White died and replaced by Michael White	
1506–1507	Allan Stavely	Merchant.
1507–1508	John Birkhead	Merchant.
1508–1509	Sir John Petty died and replaced by John Dodgson	
1509–1510	George Essex	Apothecary. First year or the reign of Henry VIII.
1510–1511	John Shawe	Merchant.
1511–1512	Bertram Dawson	Merchant.
1512–1513	George Kirke	
1513–1514	William Wilson	Goldsmith.
1514–1515	John Thornton	Merchant.
1515–1516	Thomas Drawsword	MP for York, 1512
1516–1517	John Hall	Tanner.
1517–1518	John Dodgson	
1518–1519	William Wright	MP for York, 1515
1519–1520	Alan Staveley	
1520–1521	Thomas Parker	
1521–1522	Thomas Bankhouse died and replaced by Simon Vicars	
1522–1523	Paulyn Gillow died and replaced by Thomas Burton	Gillow was a merchant. Burton was MP for York, 1523
1523–1524	Thomas Drawsword	MP for York, 1512
1524–1525	John Norman	MP for York, 1523
1525–1526	William Barker	
1526–1527	Peter Jackson	MP for York, 1529
1527–1528	Robert Wilde	Merchant.
1528–1529	Thomas Mason	
1529–1530	Robert Whitfield	
1530–1531	Sir George Lawson	MP for York, 1529, 1536
1531–1532	Henry Dawson	
1532–1533	William Barker	
1533–1534	John Hodgson	MP for York, 1539, 1542
1534–1535	George Gale	Goldsmith and MP for York, 1529, 1536, 1542
1535–1536	William Wright	MP for York, 1515
1536–1537	William Harrington	Merchant. Great-grandfather of Guy Fawkes
1537–1538	Ralph Pulleyn	Goldsmith.
1538–1539	John Shawe died and replaced by John North	North was MP for York, 1545,1553
1539–1540	Robert Elward	Merchant.
1540–1541	William Dodgson	Merchant.
1541–1542	Robert Hall	Merchant and MP for York, 1545, 1553
1542–1543	John Shadlock	
1543–1544	Robert Heckleton	Fishmonger.
1544–1545	Peter Robinson	Merchant.
1545–1546	John Bean	MP for York, 1554
1546–1547	William Holme	MP for York, 1547, 1553
1547–1548	William Watson	Merchant. MP for York, 1553, 1559, 1563. First year or the reign of Edward VI
1548–1549	Robert Peacock	Merchant, and MP for York, 1558
1549–1550	George Gale	Goldsmith, and MP for York, 1529, 1536, 1542
1550–1551	John Lewis	Draper.
1551–1552	Thomas Appleyard	
1552–1553	Richard White	Draper, and MP for York, 1554
1553–1554	William Coupland	MP for York, 1554. First Year of the reign of Mary I
1554–1555	John North	MP for York, 1545,1553
1555–1556	William Beckwith	Merchant.
1556–1557	Richard Goldthorpe	MP for York, 1559
1557–1558	Robert Hall	Merchant. MP for York, 1545, 1553
1558–1559	Ralph Hall	Merchant, and MP for York, 1553, 1571. First year of the reign of Elizabeth I
1559–1560	Thomas Standevyn	
1560–1561	James Harrington	
1561–1562	Percival Crawforth	
1562–1563	Thomas Lawson	
1563–1564	Thomas Appleyard	
1564–1565	James Simson	
1565–1566	John Bean	MP for York, 1554
1566–1567	William Watson	Merchant. MP for York, 1553, 1559, 1563
1567–1568	Robert Peacock	Merchant, and MP for York, 1558
1568–1569	William Coupland	MP for York, 1554
1569–1570	William Beckwith	
1570–1571	Richard Calame	Draper.
1571–1572	Gregory Peacock	Merchant, and MP for York, 1572
1572–1573	William Alleyn	Mercer.
1573–1574	Christopher Herbert	Merchant.
1574–1575	Robert Maskewe	Merchant.
1575–1576	Thomas Harrison	Innholder.
1576–1577	Edmund Richardson died and replaced by Ralph Hall	Richardson was a Pewterer. Hall was MP for York, 1553, 1571
1577–1578	John Dyneley	Draper.
1578–1579	Hugh Graves	Merchant, and MP for York, 1571,1572
1579–1580	Robert Cripling	
1580–1581	Robert Askwith	Draper, and MP for York, 1572, 1589
1581–1582	William Robinson	Merchant, and MP for York, 1584, 1589
1582–1583	Robert Brooke	Merchant, and MP for York, 1584, 1586
1583–1584	Christopher Maltby	Draper.
1584–1585	Thomas Appleyard	
1585–1586	Andrew Trene	Merchant, and MP for York, 1593
1586–1587	Henry Maye	Innholder.
1587–1588	Ralph Richardson	Merchant.
1588–1589	James Birkbie	Council attorney.
1589–1590	Thomas Jackson	Council attorney.
1590–1591	Thomas Mosley	Merchant, and MP for York, 1597
1591–1592	Robert Watter	Haberdasher.
1592–1593	Thomas Harrison	
1593–1594	Robert Askwith	MP for York, 1572, 1589
1594–1595	William Robinson	MP for York, 1584, 1589
1595–1596	Robert Brooke	MP for York, 1584, 1586
1596–1597	James Birkbie	
1597–1598	Christopher Beckwith	
1598–1599	Edward Fawcett	
1599–1600	Christopher Concett	Apothecary.

=== 17th century ===
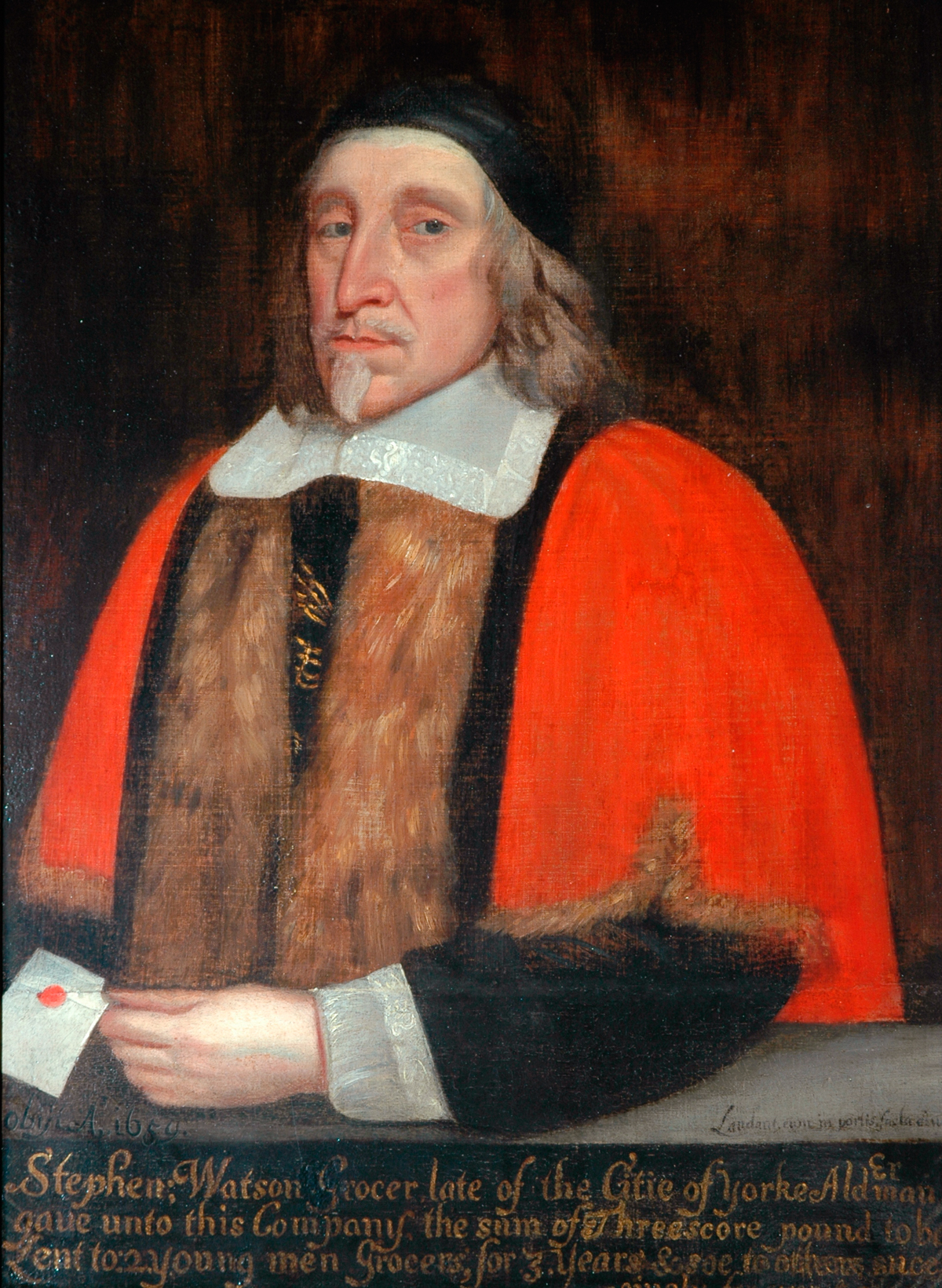
Stephen Watson was Lord Mayor of York twice, in 1646 and 1656.

Year	Name	Notes
1600–1601	Henry Hall	Merchant, and MP for York, 1601
1601–1602	Robert Peacock	
1602–1603	Thomas Mosley	MP for York, 1597.
1603–1604	Sir Robert Walter	Haberdasher. First year of the reign of James I
1604–1605	Thomas Herbert	Merchant.
1605–1606	William Greenbury	Draper.
1606–1607	Robert Askwith	Draper, and MP for York, 1604, 1614, 1621
1607–1608	Robert Harrison	Merchant.
1608–1609	Robert Myers	Mercer.
1609–1610	Christopher Concett	Apothecary.
1610–1611	Henry Hall	Merchant, and MP for York, 1601
1611–1612	William Brearey	Merchant.
1612–1613	John Harrison	Merchant.
1613–1614	Thomas Marshall	Mercer.
1614–1615	Leonard Besson	Saddler.
1615–1616	Elias Micklethwaite	Merchant.
1616–1617	William Greenbury	Draper
1617–1618	Sir Robert Askwith	Draper, and MP for York, 1604, 1614, 1621
1618–1619	Thomas Agar	Tanner.
1619–1620	William Morrison	Merchant.
1620–1621	William Watter	Saddler.
1621–1622	Christopher Dickenson	Merchant.
1622–1623	William Brearey	
1623–1624	Robert Myers	
1624–1625	Matthew Topham	Merchant
1625–1626	Thomas Lawne	First year of the reign of Charles I
1626–1627	Leonard Besson	Saddler
1627–1628	Elias Micklethwaite	
1628–1629	Robert Belt	Merchant.
1629–1630	Christopher Croft	Mercer.
1630–1631	Edmund Cowper	Merchant.
1631–1632	Robert Hemsworth	Draper.
1632–1633	Thomas Hoyle	Merchant. MP for York, 1628–29 and 1640–50. Committed suicide, 1650.
1633–1634	Sir William Allenson	Draper, and MP for York, 1654
1634–1635	James Hutchenson	Merchant.
1635–1636	Thomas Hodgson	Mercer.
1636–1637	Henry Thompson	Merchant.
1637–1638	John Vaux	Prothonotary.
1638–1639	William Scott	Merchant.
1639–1640	Sir Roger Jacques	Merchant, and MP for York, 1640
1640–1641	Sir Robert Belt	Merchant
1641–1642	Sir Christopher Croft	Mercer
1642–1644	Sir Edmund Cooper	Merchant. Start of the English Civil War. York was initially held by the Royalists (Cavaliers).
1644–1645	Sir Edmund Cooper displaced and replaced by Thomas Hoyle	Hoyle was MP for York, 1654. Parliamentarians (Roundheads) take control from now to the restoration under Lord Mayors sympathetic to (or willing to accommodate), the Parliamentary cause.
1645–1646	John Geldart	Merchant, and MP for York, 1656
1646–1647	Stephen Watson	Grocer.
1647–1648	Thomas Dickenson	Merchant, and MP for York, 1654, 1656, 1659
1648–1649	Robert Horner	Merchant
1649–1650	Leonard Thompson	Merchant
1650–1651	William Tayler	Merchant
1651–1652	James Brooke	Merchant
1652–1653	William Metcalfe	Draper
1653–1654	Henry Thompson	Merchant
1654–1655	John Geldart	Merchant, and MP for York, 1656
1655–1656	Sir William Allenson	Draper, and MP for York, 1640
1656–1657	Stephen Watson	
1657–1658	Sir Thomas Dickenson	Merchant, and MP for York, 1654, 1656, 1659
1658–1659	Robert Horner	Merchant
1659–1660	Leonard Thompson	Merchant
1660–1661	Christopher Topham	Merchant, and MP for York, 1659
1661–1662	James Brooke	By the Kings mandate.
1662–1663	George Lamplugh	Merchant
1663–1664	Henry Thompson	Merchant
1664–1665	Edward Elwicke	Apothecary
1665–1666	Richard Hewitt	Merchant
1666–1667	George Mancklins	Skinner
1667–1668	Cressye Burnett	Merchant
1668–1669	Henry Tireman	Draper
1669–1670	Christopher Brearey	Merchant
1670–1671	Thomas Bawtry	Merchant
1671–1672	William Richardson	Draper
1672–1673	Sir Henry Thompson	Wine merchant, and MP for York, 1673
1673–1674	Thomas Williamson	Merchant
1674–1675	Richard Metcalfe	Merchant
1675–1676	William Ramsden	Merchant
1676–1677	Yorke Horner	Merchant
1677–1678	Francis Elcock	Grocer
1678–1679	Philip Herbert	Merchant
1679–1680	Richard Shaw	Butcher
1680–1681	John Constable	Grocer
1681–1682	Thomas Carter	Merchant
1682–1683	John Wood	
1683–1684	Edward Thompson	MP for York, 1689, 1695, 1701
1684–1685	Robert Waller	Attorney
1685–1686	John Thompson	Goldsmith
1686–1687	Leonard Wilberfoss	
1687–1688	Thomas Mosley	Apothecary
1688–1689	Thomas Rayne displaced and replaced by Robert Waller	Both attorneys
1689–1690	John Foster	Haberdasher
1690–1691	Samuel Dawson	Merchant
1691–1692	George Stockton	Silk Weaver
1692–1693	Joshua Earnshaw	Merchant
1693–1994	Andrew Perrott	Merchant
1694–1695	Robert Davy	Hosier
1695–1696	Sir Gilbert Metcalfe	Merchant
1696-1696	John Constable	Grocer
1697–1698	Mark Gill	Goldsmith
1698–1699	Roger Shackleton	
1699–1700	Henry Thompson	MP for York, 1690

=== 18th century ===
Year	Name	Notes
1700–1701	Sir William Robinson	MP for Northallerton,1689 and for York,1698
1701–1702	Tobias Jenkins	MP for York, 1695,1701,1715
1702–1703	John Peckett	Merchant
1703–1704	Thomas Dawson	Merchant
1704–1705	Elias Pawson	Merchant
1705–1706	Charles Redman	Toyman
1706–1707	Emanuel Justice	Merchant
1707–1708	Robert Benson	MP for York, 1705
1708–1709	Richard Thompson	Merchant
1709–1710	William Pickering	
1710–1711	Charles Perrott	Merchant
1711–1712	Thomas Pickering	Attorney
1712–1713	William Cornwell	Brewer
1713–1714	Christopher Hutton	Glover
1714-1715	William Redman	Pinner
1715–1716	Robert Fairfax	MP for York, 1713
1716–1717	Richard Towne	Mercer
1717–1718	Henry Baines	Toyman
1718–1719	Tancred Robinson	Rear-admiral
1719–1720	John Read	Toyman
1720–1721	Tobias Jenkins	MP for York, 1695,1701,1715
1721–1722	Richard Thompson	Merchant
1722–1723	Charles Redman	Toyman
1723–1724	Charles Perrott	Merchant
1724–1725	Thomas Agar	Woollen-draper
1725–1726	William Cornwell	Brewer
1726–1727	Samuel Clarke	Haberdasher
1727–1728	Richard Baine	Grocer
1728–1729	Peter Whitton	Grocer
1729–1730	William Dobson	Apothecary
1730–1731	John Stainforth	Receiver of Land Tax
1731–1732	Jonas Thompson	Attorney
1732–1733	Henry Baines	Toyman
1733–1734	James Dodsworth	Apothecary & Grocer
1734–1735	William Whytehead	Attorney at Law
1735-1736	James Barnard	Mercer
1736–1737	Samuel Clark	Haberdasher
1737–1738	Sir John Lister Kaye	MP for York, 1734
1738–1739	George Benson died and replaced by Sir Tancred Robinson, Bt	Robinson was a Rear-admiral
1739–1740	George Escricke	Hatter
1740–1741	George Skelton	Merchant
1741–1742	Richard Lawson	Wine Merchant
1742–1743	John Mayer	Attorney
1743–1744	William Stephenson	Merchant
1744–1745	Thomas Agar	Merchant
1745–1746	John Raper	Merchant
1746–1757	John Read	Toyman
1747–1748	George Escricke	Hatter
1748–1749	Francis Jefferson	Merchant
1749–1750	James Rowe	Druggist
1750–1751	Matthew Lister	Timber-merchant
1751–1752	George Skelton	Merchant
1752–1753	James Barnard	Mercer
1753–1754	William Coates	Glover
1754–1755	Richard Lawson	Wine Merchant
1755–1756	Thomas Matthews	Brewer
1756–1757	Richard Farrer	Upholsterer
1757–1758	George Fox Lane	MP for York, 1742–1761
1758–1759	John Allanson	Merchant
1759–1760	Godfrey Wentworth	MP for York, 1741, 1742
1760–1761	Francis Stephenson	Merchant
1761–1762	Thomas Bowes	Apothecary
1762–1763	John Mayer	Attorney
1763–1764	Anby Taylor	Apothecary
1764–1765	Francis Bacon	Apothecary
1765–1766	Henry Raper	Merchant
1766–1767	John Wakefield	Merchant
1767–1768	Richard Garland	Factor
1768–1769	James Rowe	Druggist
1769–1770	Richard Farrer	Upholsterer
1770–1771	John Carr	Architect
1771–1772	Edward Wallis	Apothecary
1772–1773	Charles Turner	MP for York, 1768–1783
1773–1774	Henry Jubb	Apothecary
1774–1775	Hugh Robinson	Merchant
1775-1775	John Allanson	Merchant
1776–1777	Francis Stephenson	Merchant
1777–1778	Thomas Bowes died and replaced by Francis Bacon	Both were apothecaries
1778–1779	Thomas Barstow	Esquire
1779–1780	Edward Stabler	Merchant
1780–1781	Thomas Cordley	Wine-merchant
1781–1782	Henry Myers	Merchant
1782–1783	Henry Raper	Merchant
1783–1784	William Siddall	Woollen-draper
1784–1785	Thomas Kilby	Brewer
1785-1785	James Woodhouse died and replaced by John Carr	Carr was an architect
1786–1787	Thomas Smith	Merchant
1787–1788	Sir William Milner	MP for York, 1790
1788–1789	William Bluitt	Esquire
1789–1790	Thomas Hartley	Brewer
1790–1791	Joshua Oldfield	Wine-merchant
1791–1792	Thomas Wilson	Bookseller
1792–1793	Ralph Dodsworth	Merchant
1793–1794	William Siddall died and replaced by Thomas Smith	Siddall was a woollen-merchant Smith was a merchant.
1794–1795	John Hay	Woollen-draper
1795–1796	Richard Metcalfe	Merchant-tailor
1796–1797	Theophilus de Garencières	Apothecary
1797–1798	Richard Hobson	Woollen-draper
1798–1799	Sir William Milner	MP for York, 1790
1799–1800	William Ellis	Merchant

=== 19th century ===
Year	Name	Notes
1800–1801	James Robson	Linen-draper
1801–1802	John Wilkinson	Druggist
1802–1803	William Hotham	Barrister-at-Law
1803-1804	Thomas Hartley	Esquire
1804–1805	John Kilby	Brewer
1805–1806	Robert Stockton	Druggist
1806–1807	Thomas Wilson	Bookseller
1807–1808	William Ellis	Merchant
1808–1809	Robert Rhodes	Merchant tailor
1809–1810	Samuel Wormald	Tanner
1810–1811	George Peacock	Esquire
1811–1812	Lawrence Dundas, 1st Earl of Zetland	MP for Richmond,1790,1808; MP for York, 1802,1811
1812–1813	Isaac Spencer	Druggist
1813–1814	Thomas Smith	Merchant
1814–1815	William Dunsley	Brewer
1815–1816	William Hutchenson Hearon	Tea Dealer
1816–1817	John Dales	Druggist
1817–1818	Robert Chaloner	MP for Richmond, 1810 and MP for York, 1820
1818–1819	James Saunders	
1819–1820	William Hotham	
1820–1821	George Peacock	
1821–1822	Lawrence Dundas, 1st Earl of Zetland	MP for Richmond,1790,1808; MP for York, 1802,1811
1822–1823	Isaac Spencer	
1823–1824	Thomas Smith	
1824–1825	William Dunsley	
1825–1826	William Oldfield	
1826–1827	William Cooper	
1827–1828	William Hutchenson Hearon	Tea Dealer
1828–1829	George Champney	
1829–1830	John Dales	
1830–1831	Edward Robert Petre	
1831–1832	Lawrence Dundas, 1st Earl of Zetland	MP for Richmond,1790,1808; MP for York, 1802,1811
1832–1833	William Oldfield	
1833–1834	James Barber	
1834–1835	William Cooper	
1835–1836	Thomas Wood Wilson	
1836-1836	Sir Sir John Simpson	Corn merchant
1836–1837	James Meek Snr	Glassmaker and banker
1837–1839	George Hudson	"The Railway King" and MP for Sunderland, 1845–1859
1839–1840	William Stephenson Clark	Medical doctor
1840–1841	Robert Cattle	
1841–1842	William Matterson	Surgeon
1842–1844	Joseph Buckle	
1844–1845	William Gray	Solicitor
1845–1846	William Richardson	Solicitor
1846–1847	George Hudson	"The Railway King" and MP for Sunderland, 1845–1859
1847–1848	James Richardson	
1848–1849	Edward Richard Anderson	
1849–1850	George Hicks Seymour	Solicitor
1850–1851	James Meek Snr	Glassmaker and banker
1851–1852	Henry Cooper	Wine merchant
1852–1853	Richard Evers	Tailor
1853–1854	George Leeman	Solicitor, railway entrepreneur, and MP for York, 1865,1871
1854–1855	George Wilson	
1855–1856	James Meek Jnr	Banker
1856–1857	Edward Richard Anderson	Solicitor
1857–1858	John Wood	Solicitor and Yorkshire Coroner.
1858–1859	William Dalla Husband	Surgeon
1859–1860	Richard Evers	Tailor
1860–1861	George Leeman	Solicitor, railway entrepreneur, and MP for York, 1865,1871
1861–1863	William Fox Clark	Solicitor
1863–1864	Richard Welch Hollon	Druggist
1864–1865	Edwin Wade	Dental surgeon
1865–1867	James Meek Jnr	Banker
1867–1868	Ralph Weatherley	Owner of building company.
1868–1869	Alfred Ely Hargrove	
1869–1870	John Colburn	Silversmith and jeweller
1870–1871	George Leeman	Solicitor, railway entrepreneur, and MP for York, 1865,1871
1871–1872	William Walker	Solicitor
1872–1873	Henry Steward	
1873–1874	John March	Brewer
1874–1875	Joseph Terry	Chocolate maker.
1875–1876	Edward Rooke	Wine and spirit merchant
1876–1877	James Melrose	Land agent and brewer
1877–1878	William Varey	Bacon factor
1878–1879	George Brown	Solicitor
1879–1880	Thomas Samuel Watkinson died and replaced by William Wilkinson Wilberforce	Watkinson owned iron- and steelworks. Wilberforce was a company director
1880–1881	John Stephenson Rowntree	Chocolate maker.
1881–1882	Joseph Agar	Tannery owner
1882–1883	Thomas Varey	Bacon Factor. Son of Wm. Varey (Mayor,1877)
1883–1884	William Benson Richardson	
1884–1885	John Close	Businessman
1885–1887	Joseph Terry	Chocolate maker.
1887–1888	Joseph Sykes Rymer	Company director
1888–1890	Joseph Agar	Tannery owner
1890–1891	Philip Matthews died and replaced by Sir Joseph Terry	Matthews was an Innkeeper. Died of Typhoid. Terry was a chocolate maker.
1891–1893	John Close	Businessman
1893–1894	Thomas Clayton	
1894–1895	William McKay	
1895–1897	Christopher Annakin-Milward	Hatter, hosier and shirtmaker. Knighted 1897
1897–1898	Edwin Gray	Son of Wm Gray (Mayor, 1844). Solicitor. His married suffragist and social reformer Almyra Vickers in 1882. His brother was the composer Alan Gray.
1898–1899	Samuel Border	Grocer
1899–1900	Joseph Sykes Rymer	Company director

=== 20th century ===
Year	Name	Notes
1900–1901	Edward William Purnell	Tobacconist
1901–1902	Lancelot Foster	Agricultural merchant and Company Director
1902–1903	Edwin Gray	Solicitor. Conservative party. Second term (see 1897-8).
1903–1906	Robert Horton Vernon Wragge	Tour operator
1906–1907	William Bentley	Bentley was a bookseller. He died in office and replaced by Samuel Border.
1907-1907	Samuel Border	Border was a grocer.
1907–1908	Sir Joseph Sykes Rymer	Coal, lime and sand merchant
1908–1910	James Birch	Plumber and Glazier
1910–1911	Thomas Carter	Butcher
1911–1912	Norman Green	
1912–1913	Sir Joseph Sykes Rymer	Coal, lime and sand merchant
1913–1914	Henry Rhodes Brown	Founder of Browns department store
1914–1915	John Bowes Morrell	Company director, publisher and writer
1915–1918	William Alexander Forster Todd	
1918–1919	Sir William Alexander Forster Todd	
1919–1921	Edward Walker	
1921–1922	William Henry Birch	Builder
1922–1923	James Brown Inglis	Jeweller and silversmith
1923–1924	William Dobbie	Railwayman and MP for Rotherham, 1933
1924–1925	Sir Robert Newbald Kay	Solicitor and MP for Elland, 1903
1925–1926	William Wright	
1926–1927	Oscar Frederick Rowntree	
1927–1928	Arthur Richmond Fox	
1928–1929	Edwin John Leetham Rymer	Coal merchant. Son of Sir Joseph Sykes Rymer, Mayor 1907,1912
1929–1930	Charles William Shipley	Railwayman
1930–1931	Sir William Alexander Forster-Todd	
1931–1932	Robert Horton Vernon Wragge	Tour operator
1932–1933	Henry Rhodes Brown	
1933–1935	Herbert Edward Harrowell	Solicitor
1935–1936	William Henry Shaw	Railwayman
1936–1937	Thomas Morris	Builder
1937–1938	Charles Thornburn Hutchinson	Grocer
1938–1939	William Cooper	
1939–1940	Robert James Pulleyn	Builder
1940–1941	William Horsman	Overseer at Rowntrees
1941–1942	Edna Annie Crichton	First woman to be Lord Mayor
1942–1943	Edward Lacy	Painter and Decorator
1943–1944	William Thompson	
1944–1945	Harold de Bourg Chapman de Bourg	Estate agent and Surveyor
1945–1947	Fred Gaines	
1947–1948	William Dobbie	Railwayman and MP for Rotherham, 1933
1949–1950	John Bowes Morrell	Company Director, publisher and writer
1950–1951	Ernest Harwood	
1951–1952	John Harold Kaye	
1952–1953	Cecil Walter Wright	
1953–1954	Charles Oliver	Chairman, Furniture Company
1954–1955	Frank Wright	
1955–1956	Fred Brown	
1956–1957	Vincent Albert Bosworth	
1957–1958	Eric Lawson Keld	
1958–1959	Albert Leslie Philipson	
1959–1960	Robert Stavers Oloman	
1960–1961	Wilfred Ward	
1961–1962	Ivy Gladys Wightman	
1962–1963	Robert Alexander Cattle	
1963–1964	Archibald Kirk	
1964–1965	Stanley Palphramand	Organbuilder
1965–1966	William Bridge	
1966–1967	Walter Elliott Milburn	
1967–1968	William Edwin Hargrave	
1968–1969	Mona May Armitage	
1969–1970	Ronald Scobey	
1970–1971	Arthur Joseph Hardcastle	
1971–1972	Richard Scruton	
1972–1973	Harry Victor Boulton	
1973–1974	Jack Milnes Wood	
1974–1975	William Thomas Burke	
1975–1976	Jack Penty Birch	Builder
1976–1977	Jack Archer	Railwayman
1977–1978	Thomas Hibbert	
1978–1979	Samuel Edwin Brearley	
1979–1980	William Richardson	
1980–1981	Clive Bushell Kay	Company Director
1981–1982	Charles William Fairclough	
1982–1983	Philip Booth	
1983–1984	Stephen Fred Galloway	BT business planning manager
1984–1985	Kenneth Cooper	Also a Deputy Lord Lieutenant of North Yorkshire
1985–1986	Marjorie Seward Bwye	
1986–1987	Cyril Arthur Waite	
1987–1988	Malcolm James Heppell	Railwayman
1988–1989	Reginald Pulleyn	Railwayman
1989–1990	Jack Archer	
1990–1991	Keith Simpson Wood	
1991–1992	Albert Cowen	
1992–1993	Bernard Alfred Bell	Railwayman
1993–1994	Ann Reid	
1994–1995	David Wilde	Teacher
1995–1996	John Boardman	Teacher, bus driver
1996–1997	Kenneth William King	Postman
1997–1998	Michael John Bradley	
1998–1999	Derek Wilbraham Smallwood	Retired bus driver
1999–2000	Peter Vaughan	

=== 21st century ===
Year	Name	Notes
2000–2001	Shân Edryd Braund	
2001–2002	Irene Mary Waudby	
2002–2003	David Anthony Horton	Retired Railway Engineer
2003–2004	Charles Hall	
2004–2005	Janet Looker	retired Solicitor
2005–2006	Janet Greenwood	
2006–2007	Janet Hopton	
2007–2008	Irene Mary Waudby	
2008–2009	Brian Walter Joseph Edward Watson	
2009–2010	John Galvin	
2010–2011	Sue Galloway	
2011–2012	David Anthony Horton	
2012–2013	Keith Hyman	
2013–2014	Julie Gunnell	Charity worker
2014–2015	Ian Gillies	Former police officer, sales manager, businessman
2015–2016	Sonja Crisp	
2016–2017	Dave Taylor	Former local government worker
2017–2018	Barbara Boyce	Former local government worker and teacher
2018–2019	Keith Orrell	
2019–2021	Janet Looker	Served two years due to the coronavirus pandemic
2021–2022	Chris Cullwick	Ordained in the Church of England
2022–2023	David Carr	
2023–2024	Chris Cullwick	Ordained in the Church of England
2024–2025	Margaret Wells	
2025–2026	Martin Rowley	Funeral Director
2026–2027	Margaret Wells	

== See also ==
- List of lord mayoralties and lord provostships in the United Kingdom

== Bibliography ==
- Coster, Will (1997). "Communities during war". In Naphy, William G.; Roberts, Penny (eds.). Fear in Early Modern Society (illustrated ed.). Manchester University Press. pp. 106–109. ISBN 9780719052057.
- Drake, Francis (1736). "A Catalogue of the Mayors and Bailiffs, Lord Mayors, and Sheriffs of the city of Your from anno 1273, 1 Edward I, and upwards, to the present year (1735)". Eboracum: or, The history and antiquities of the city of York, from its original to the present times: Together with the history of the cathedral church, and the lives of the archbishops of that see ... Printed by W. Bowyer for the author. p. 359–367.
- York History staff (2013). York in the Civil War. Archived from the original on 10 October 2014.
