= Robert Hall (MP for York) =

Member of the Parliament of England

Member of the England Parliament for York
- In office 1545–1547
- Preceded by: John Hogeson; George Gale
- Succeeded by: Thomas Gargrave; William Holme
- In office 1553 (October) – 1554 (April)
- Preceded by: William Watson (16th century MP); William Holme
- Succeeded by: John Beane; Richard White

Personal details
- Born: c. 1497
- Died: 5 October 1565
- Spouse: Jane Harrington
- Children: John; Robert; Leonard; Mary; Ann; Elizabeth; Katherine

Robert Hall was one of two Members of the Parliament of England for the constituency of York on two occasions between 1545–47 and October 1553 and April 1554 .

== Life and politics ==
Robert was born about 1497 to Robert Hall of Leventhorpe. He married Jane Harrington and had at least three sons and four daughters. His daughter Katherine would marry the son of York MP, Robert Paycock. His son, Leonard, would become a freeman of York in 1565 and marry Mary Peacock in All Saints' Church on 6 September 1562. His daughter Mary would marry Thomas Sotheby of Bishop Wilton. Elizabeth would marry John Harrison.

He became a member of the Corpus Christi Guild in 1518 and then the Merchant Guild in 1521. He was appointed as a constable of the city of York in 1530 and was a senior chamberlain in 1533. The following year became a member of the "twenty four". In 1538 he became an alderman and remained so until his death. He served two terms as Lord Mayor in 1542 and 1558.

The Hall family were minor gentry in the county of Yorkshire. His early career included selling glass for Sheriff Hutton castle in 1537. He was also a trader in lead and had been set to make a small fortune form supplying the Netherlands and Bordeaux in 1552 when an embargo was imposed. He would still become one of the wealthiest laymen in the city. He lived in the parish of Christ Church on Goodramgate. He was mayor when Henry VIII visited the city on 15 September 1541. At the beginning his second term as mayor, the city council sent spies to Scarborough during the rebellions of 1554–57.

He was chosen to be MP for the city on two occasions in 1545-47 and the short session between October 1553 and April 1554. His first term was occupied with obtaining economic benefits for the city.

He died on 5 October 1565 and left an extensive will. An initial bequest of twelve pounds to the poor of the city was added to by an annual gift of four pounds. His children would get a one third share of his goods, while he left his properties to his wife and children. It is noteworthy that he named as one of the supervisors of his will as one Edward Fawkes, father of the 1605 conspiracy, Guy Fawkes.

Political offices
Preceded by John Hogeson; George Gale	Member of Parliament; 1545 - 1547	Next: Thomas Gargrave; William Holme
Preceded by William Watson; William Holme	Member of Parliament; 1553 (October) - 1554 (April)	Next: John Beane; Richard White
