= John North (City of York MP) =

English Member of Parliament

Member of the England Parliament for York
- In office 1545–1547
- Preceded by: John Hogeson; George Gale
- Succeeded by: Thomas Gargrave; William Holme
- In office 1553 (October) – 1554 (April)
- Preceded by: William Watson (16th century MP); William Holme
- Succeeded by: John Beane; Richard White

Personal details
- Born: 1495
- Died: 1558 (aged 62–63)
- Spouse: Agnes Roger
- Children: 1 son

John North (1495–1558) was one of two Members of the Parliament of England for the constituency of York on two occasions between 1545 and 1547 and October 1553 and April 1554.

== Life and politics ==
John was born in about 1495 into a family of craftsmen. He lived his entire life in St. Margaret's parish in Walmgate, despite owning many properties later in life. He married Agnes, daughter of John Roger and had at least one son.

He was a tanner and made a freeman of the city in 1515. He also dealt in corn and lime. It was the latter trade that brought him into conflict with other merchants when he caused a rise in the price of corn by buying up supplies from the East Riding and Lincolnshire. His business dealings made him amongst the richest laymen in the city. His wealth was helped by his marriage to Agnes, whose father was one of three richest people of his generation. He held several important positions in the city. He followed the established career progression by becoming a bridgemaster first in 1523–24. He was responsible for collecting revenue of those who had properties on Ousebridge. He then became a junior chamberlain in 1527–28 before being appointed a sheriff in 1529–30. He became an alderman in 1534, a position he held until his death. He was Lord Mayor on two occasions between 1538 and 1539 and again between 1554 and 1555. In between those spells as Lord Mayor he was chosen as MP for the city of York also on two occasions between 1545 and 1547 and again in the short session between October 1553 and April 1554. He was also a member of the guild of St Christopher and St George, rising to the rank of Keeper.

His main political activity was in regard of providing military aid to the Crown at the time of Wyatt's rebellion during his second term as mayor, and restoring plays and religious processions in the city, specifically those on St Gerorge's Day and Whit Tuesday. In 1547 the city council of York, in response from a letter form the King's Council of 12 July, appointed John as Captain of a force of foot soldiers to be made ready to head to Flamborough to defend the east coast following the sighting of sixteen warships.

He died in 1558 and was buried in St Margaret's Church in Walmgate. In his will he bequeathed his property of nineteen houses, nine closes, two gardens, two orchards, a bowling alley and a dovecote to his wife, son and granddaughters, as well as lands in Fulford and leases in Skirpenbeck. He left charitable donations of sixpence to every house in his parish.

Political offices
Preceded by John Hogeson; George Gale	Member of Parliament; 1545–1547	Next: Thomas Gargrave; William Holme
Preceded by William Watson; William Holme	Member of Parliament; 1553 (October) - 1554 (April)	Next: John Beane; Richard White
