= Robert Holme (died 1433) =

Robert Holme, of York, was an English Member of Parliament.

He was a Member (MP) of the Parliament of England for City of York in November 1414. He was Mayor of York 3 February 1413–14.

Parliament of England
Preceded by unknown unknown	Member of Parliament for City of York; Nov. 1414; With: John Northby	Succeeded by John Morton; Richard Russell
