= William Wright (York merchant) =

English Member of Parliament

Member of the England Parliament for York
- In office 5 February 1515 – 22 December 1515
- Preceded by: William Nelson; Thomas Drawswerd
- Succeeded by: Thomas Burton; John Norman

Personal details
- Born: 1482
- Died: 1543 (aged 60–61)
- Spouse: Ursula Joye
- Children: 2 children known
- Parent: William (Father)

William Wright was one of two Members of the Parliament of England for the constituency of York during the year 1515.

== Life and politics ==
There are few records detailing the life of William Wright. Born around 1482 to William Wright, he was a merchant and notary who became a member of York's Corpus Christi Guild in 1503 and held the offices of sheriff (1511–1512) and Alderman of the City of York (1514).

Wright was elected to represent the city as MP in January 1515, but this was his only term in office, and the parliament was dissolved on 22 December 1515. Wright was originally intended to serve with Alan Staveley, but Staveley was replaced by the more experienced William Nelson. He also served as lord mayor of York (1518–1519), having been elected by letters patent. At some point after 1515 he married Urusula Joye of Riccall. In 1523 he was contracted by Cardinal Wolsey to be master of the archiepiscopal mint. He served a second term as lord mayor in 1535, which was marked by a dispute with the Archbishop of York over land at Bishopfields. William was a named executor of the will of fellow merchant and horner, William Huby.

Wright made his will on 10 April 1543, shortly before his death. He requested to be buried in St Martin's Church in Coney Street and left a third of his goods to his wife and children.

Political offices
Preceded by William Nelson; Thomas Drawswerd	Member of Parliament; 1515–1515	Next: Thomas Burton; John Norman
