= James Meek =

James Meek may refer to:

- James Meek (minister) (1742–1810), Enlightenment cleric
- James Meek (writer) (born 1962), British writer
- James Meek of York (1790–1862), British politician
- James Gordon Meek (born 1968), American journalist and convicted child sex offender

== See also ==
- James Meeker (born 1995), American baseball player
