= Thomas Drawswerd =

English Member of Parliament

Member of the England Parliament for York
- In office 1512–1515
- Preceded by: William Nelson; Brian Palmes
- Succeeded by: William Nelson; William Wright

Personal details
- Born: c. 1476
- Died: 1529
- Spouse: Maud
- Children: George; Maud

Thomas Drawswerd was one of two Members of the Parliament of England for the constituency of York between 1512 and 1515.

== Life and politics ==
Thomas was born about 1476 into a family of carvers and image makers. He followed into the trade, which led to him becoming a freeman of the city of York in 1496 and a member of Corpus Christi guild. His success as a carver saw him hold several civic offices in the city. These included junior chamberlain (1501–02), sheriff (1505–06), alderman (1508 until his death) and twice lord mayor (1515–16 and 1523–24).

There is not much recorded of his time in parliament other than pursuing remission for the fee farm in the city. He had been requested by Henry VIII to be returned to the 1515 parliament against the actual vote by the city council. As he was due to become mayor of York, the council refused to allow him to serve as MP. At the end of his first term of office as mayor, there were riots surrounding the election of aldermen. His second term was less controversial in which he rebuffed a royal diktat on the appointment of the city sheriff and Thomas' gift of Holtby Hall to the city.

He was a renowned carver across the country. Among his known works are the oak rood screen in St Mary Magdalene Church, Newark. This is thought to be the only surviving example of his work. He constructed a pageant wagon in 1501 for the Merchants Guild for which he was paid five marks and the old wagon. Thomas' new wagon would later be used in 1541 when Henry VIII visited the city and was placed in Ousegate. He also was paid forty shillings to produce a Domesday pageant in 1507.

Thomas was married to Maud and they had two children, George and Maud. He died in 1529 and was buried in St Martin's Church. He made provision in his will that after his wife's death, four of his properties to the Church and two to St Christopher's guild.

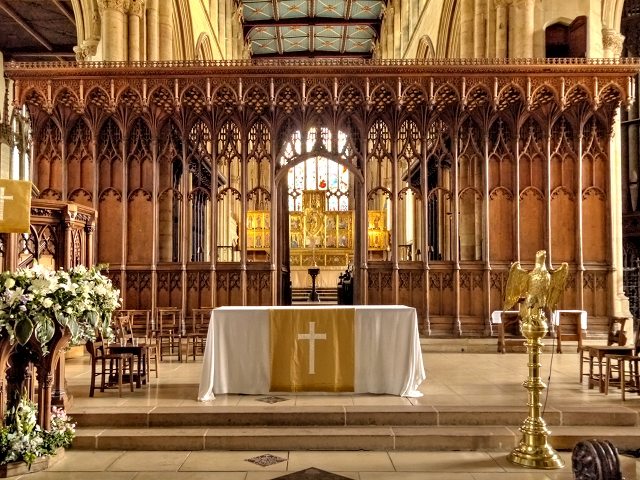
The Church of St Mary Magdalene, Nave Altar and Rood Screen, Newark

Political offices
Preceded by William Nelson; Brian Palmes	Member of Parliament; 1512–1515	Next: William Nelson; William Wright
