= Alne =

Alne may refer to one of the following locations;

- Alne, North Yorkshire, England
- River Alne, Warwickshire, England
- Great Alne, Warwickshire
- Little Alne, Warwickshire

== See also ==
- William Alne, MP
