= Thomas Holme (MP) =

English Member of Parliament (died 1406)

Thomas Holme (died 1406), of York, was an English Member of Parliament (MP).

He was a Member of the Parliament of England for City of York in the Parliaments of 1385 and February 1388. He was Mayor of York 1373–4. He was the brother of Robert Holme and the son-in-law of Walter Frost, both also MPs.
