= Joseph Terry =

English industrialist and politician

Sir Joseph Terry JP
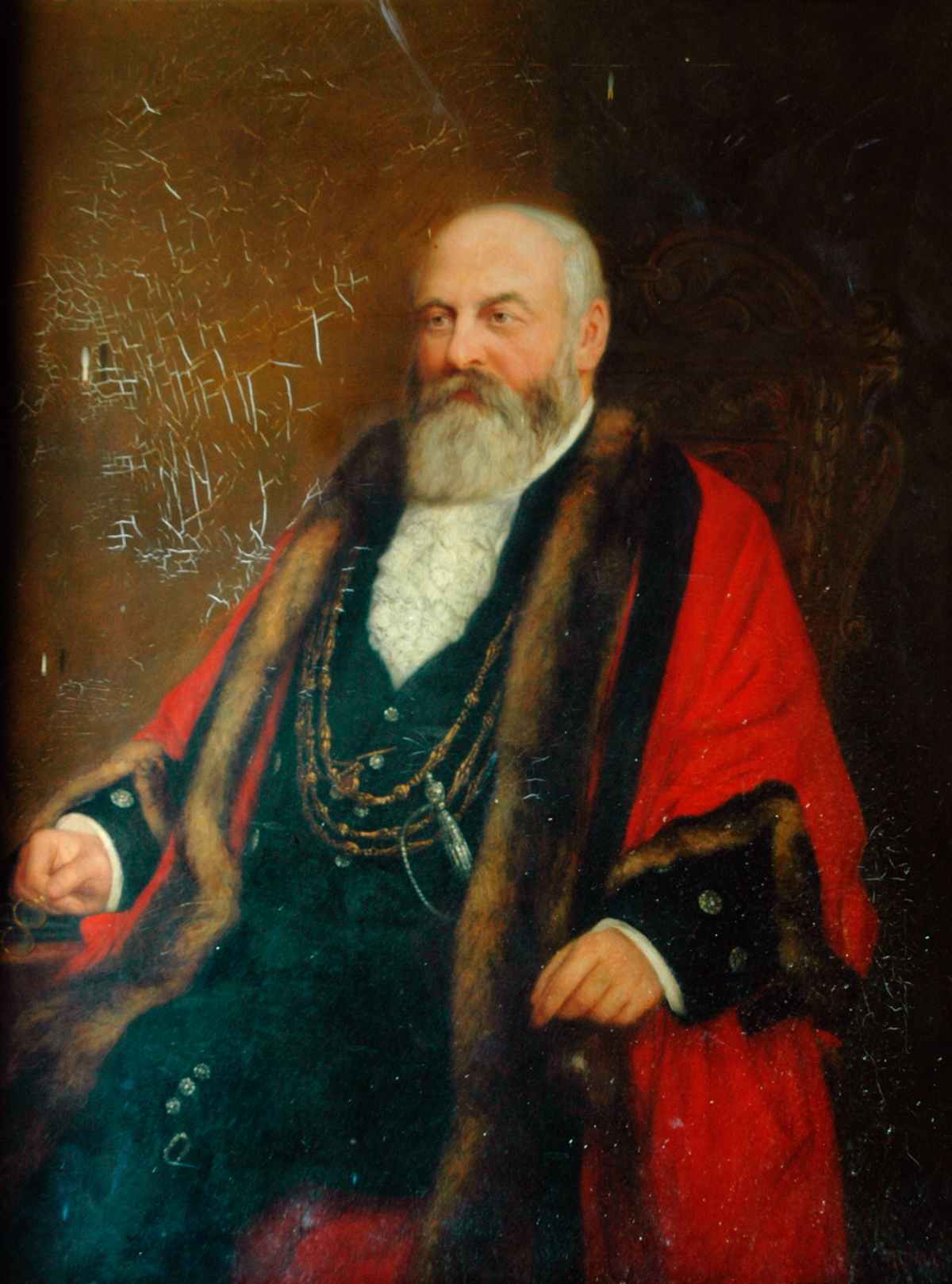
- Lord Mayoral portrait by George Fall, 1897

Lord Mayor of York
- In office 1874–1875
- Preceded by: John March
- Succeeded by: Edward Rooke
- In office 1885–1887
- Preceded by: John Close
- Succeeded by: Joseph Sykes Rymer
- In office 1890–1891
- Preceded by: Philip Matthews
- Succeeded by: John Close

Personal details
- Born: 7 January 1828 York, England
- Died: 12 January 1898 (aged 70) Royal Station Hotel, York, England
- Party: Conservative

Sir Joseph Terry JP (7 January 1828 – 12 January 1898) was an English confectioner, industrialist and Conservative politician who served as Lord Mayor of York on three occasions. He had previously served as a deputy mayor through his role as town sheriff in 1870, and served as Councillor for York's Monk Ward from 1860 until this appointment. He further acted as a Justice of the Peace for both the City of York and the North Riding of Yorkshire from 1887 until his death.

He is widely seen as the driving force behind the success of the confectionery company Terry's, originally co-founded by his father, through the expansion of business operations through the use of the Humber Estuary to import essential commodities such as sugar and cocoa. Later in his career, he would oversee the company's transition and specialization into a chocolatiers. Terry had also registered the trademark 'Joseph Terry's and Sons' in 1876, which would later become incorporated under his chairmanship in 1895 as 'Joseph Terry & Sons Ltd.', three years before his death at the age of 70 in 1898, during an attempt to become Member of Parliament for the City of York constituency in a by-election.

== Early life ==
Terry was born in York, to Joseph Terry, the confectioner and co-founder of Terry's of York, and his wife Harriet Atkinson, the daughter of a successful farmer from Leppington, North Yorkshire and sister-in-law to the elder Terry's initial business partner, Robert Berry. His family's wealth enabled him to attend the independent St Peter's School, York. Such wealth had arisen after Terry's of York had advantageously relocated to St Helen's Square, in the centre of York, with business benefiting from the City's intake of 30,000 shoppers and tourists daily as a result of significant developments in rail travel.

The young Joseph Terry had a comfortable upbringing, with his father's business being well established by the time of his birth due to considerable business acumen and the usage of the expanding railway network to supply his products to a growing British-wide market during the 1830s. He established retail agencies in 75 settlements, mainly in the north, but also in the Midlands, Luton and London. In 1836, he was a leading figure in establishing a trade association in London to protect the quality of lozenges and confectionery products from inferior production standards. At the time of his death in 1850, the business had 127 staff, second only to the York glass works as the city's largest employer.

== Terry's of York ==
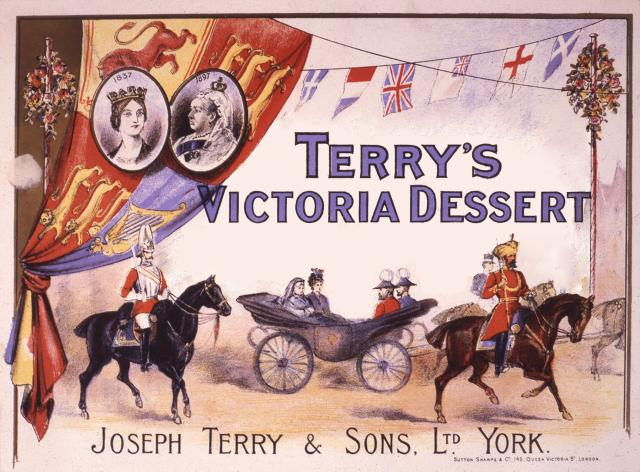
An 1897 advertisement for 'Terry's Victoria Dessert'

By the time of the elder Joseph Terry's death in 1850, Terry's was becoming a household name due to its previous trade successes across the country. The younger Joseph, along with his two brothers, Robert and John, are credited with moving confectionery production to an industrial scale with the leasing of a factory at Clementhorpe, beside the River Ouse, in 1862. Its location was particularly advantageous, as the 22-year-old Terry had drawn inspiration from the manipulation of the railways initiated by his father, and saw the benefit of importing and exporting from the river using steamboats. Vessels from the River Humber supplied coal for the factory, while larger ships would import ingredients such as sugar and cocoa from around the world twice a week. The Clementhorpe factory also improved the logistics of the company, providing ample room for the construction of warehouses to store stock. Two years later, there were 400 separate items in the firm's price list, with around 13 of them consisting of chocolate as a main ingredient; others included various candied peels, cakes, biscuits and jams among other more exotic products such as cream balls.

Terry's became established as a solely chocolate manufacturer in 1886 when Joseph built a specialized section in the Clementhorpe factory specifically to manufacture cocoa products to compete against such companies as Fry's, Cadbury's and Rowntree's. It would be at this factory that the now commonplace chocolate box assortment was invented, with the first named "Britannia".

The company applied for its first trademark in 1876 under the name "Joseph Terry's and Sons." In 1895 it incorporated as Joseph Terry & Sons Ltd., by which time it had around 500 employees. Terry also converted the historically successful St Helen's Square premises into a ballroom and restaurant, whilst retaining its status as a confectionery shop, an arrangement that lasted until 1981.

== Political career ==
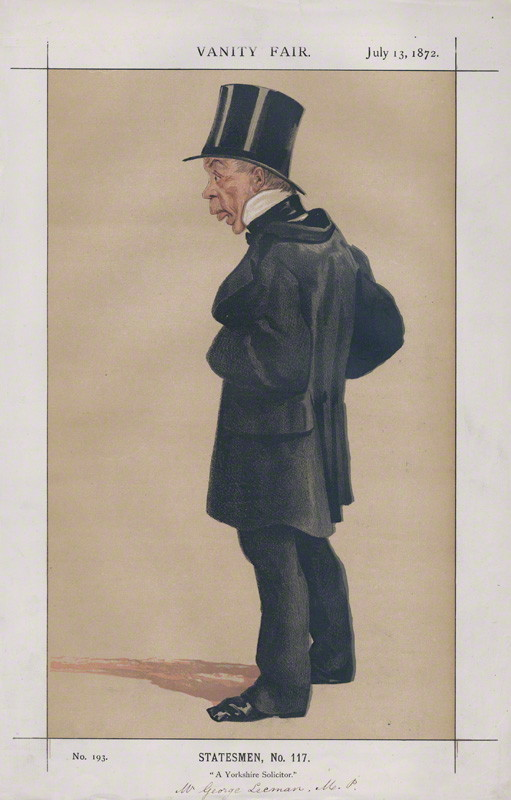
"A Yorkshire Solicitor". George Leeman as depicted by "Coïdé" in Vanity Fair, 1872

In 1860, Terry was elected Councillor for York's Monk Ward, a rural area close to the modern day Strays of York, as a Conservative. He would later be appointed Chairman of the York Conservative Association (something that his grandson, Noel Goddard Terry, would also later achieve). Experience in local government was heightened by his election as sheriff, equivalent to a deputy mayoral position, in 1870 under Liberal MP George Leeman, who served as Member of Parliament for the City of York constituency for three years prior to his appointment as Lord Mayor. In 1874, Terry became an Alderman of the City, granting him a seat at York's Guildhall for debate in a then partisan chamber under the Conservatives. The party, in response to his growing popularity, allowed him to run for the Lord Mayoralty within the same year, to which he was elected by consensus, defeating the incumbent local brewer, John March. This position granted him the style the 'Right Honourable' (a title exclusive to the Lord Mayoralty, not the individual).

Despite remaining an alderman for eleven years after his conventional one-year tenure, Terry ran for the same post again in 1885, defeating prolific businessman and philanthropist John Close, this time retaining his post for two successful tenures until 1887's election. In the same year, he was appointed Justice of the Peace for the City of York and the North Riding of Yorkshire. Terry was elected Lord Mayor for the fourth and final time in 1891, and remained popular among York residents, with arranged activities such as citywide galas, picnics and church services at the York Minster all funded by the Lord Mayor. York City Council (1980) writes that his name "appeared at the head of every charitable subscription list" and that he was widely recognized as "magnificently bearded".

A committed Freemason, Joseph Terry's successful local political career stemmed from a philanthropic and active approach to the issues of the citizens of Victorian York, often using his influential status for the benefit of the city's populace. On 23 June 1887, just two days after receiving his knighthood in that years Golden Jubilee Honours, Terry led a deputation to present an album of all documented issues encountered by York residents to Buckingham Palace for Queen Victoria's inspection. In response, "The Queen turned over a few of the leaves to look at the contents, and bowed her acceptance with stately courtesy and affection". Further philanthropic activity continued into 1893, when Terry presided over a Japanese bazaar behind the York Art Gallery (of which he was chair) where according to The York Herald, he spoke: "It is right to think of our poorer neighbors. If the bazaar is successful, then 1,000 waifs and strays would be entertained on Christmas day in the Corn Exchange."

On 7 October 1850, Joseph Terry had been granted freedom of the city due to the economic growth York was seeing fueled by his company's success. Chairmanships of local guilds were to follow; with York's Merchant Taylor's and Merchant Adventurer's both seeing the benefit of representation from a well respected and moneyed benefactor. Other local organizations followed suit; with the York Art Gallery, Horticultural Society and local waterworks company all receiving funding and financial direction by the end of his career. He further assisted in the duties of the York Cricket Club, promoting their historic move to Bootham Crescent in 1881, whilst concurrently serving on advisory panels for both the County Lunatic Asylum and the local Sunday School Committee.

== Personal life ==
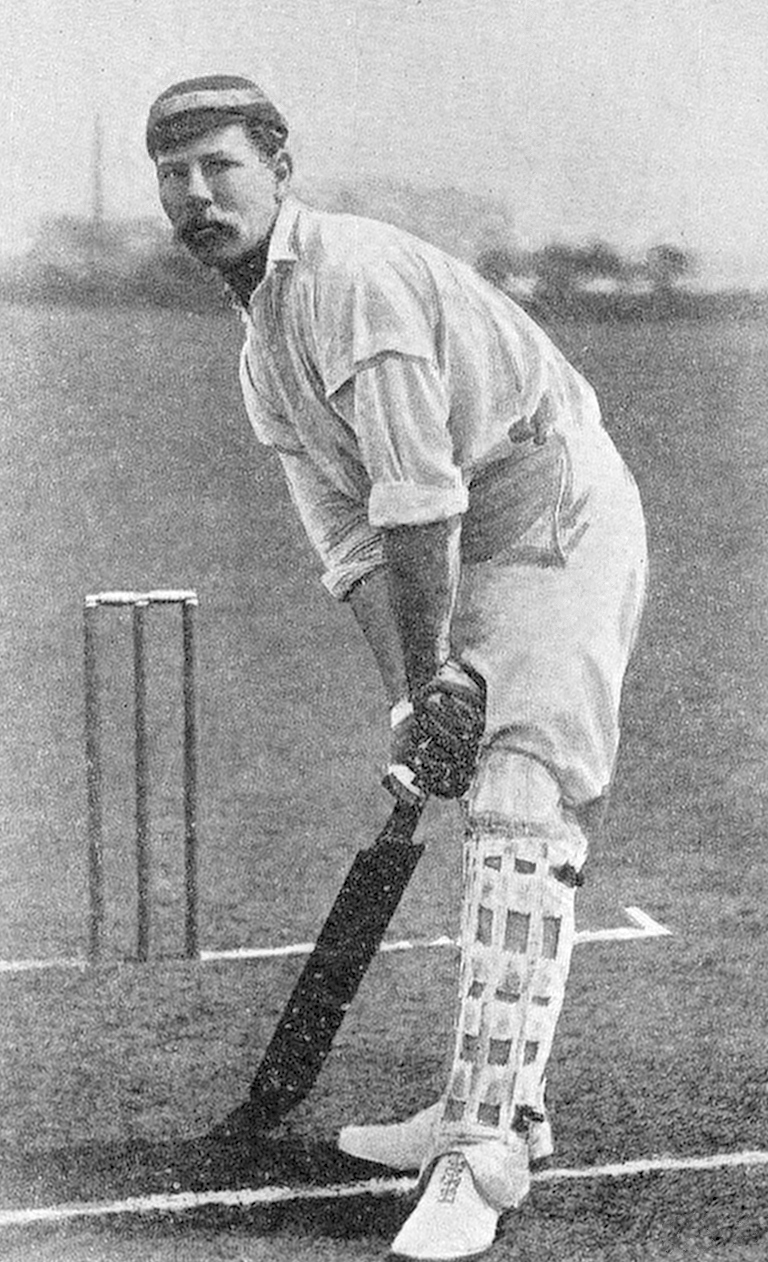
Noteworthy cricketer Charles Wright, Terry's son-in-law

Joseph married twice in his life, producing seven children in total. His first marriage to Frances Goddard, daughter of London-based physician Dr. Joseph Goddard, in 1864 produced three sons before her death in 1866. Following Goddard's death, he remarried in 1871 to Margaret Thorpe, daughter of wealthy landowner William Thorpe of Aldborough Manor. They had a son and three daughters. Margaret also came to be known as "Lady Terry" after Joseph had been knighted in 1887. Joseph's eldest son from his first marriage, Thomas Terry, became the main partner of the business in 1880, as all of his cousins (Sir Joseph's brothers' children) had chosen other professions rather than to join the family business. Thomas is perhaps best recognized for expanding trade to an international market, selling Terry's confectionery products to as far as retailers in Australia and New Zealand.

Other notable children of Terry (from the Thorpe marriage) included Sir Francis William Terry, High Sheriff of Yorkshire from 1945 to 1946, and Frances Harriet Terry, wife of cricketer Charles Wright, who played first-class cricket for Cambridge University between 1882 and 1885 and for Nottinghamshire between 1882 and 1899. Wright is considered to be the first cricket captain to declare an innings closed, something he did in 1890 against Kent. Joseph was also a close friend of Sir Frederick Milner, MP for the City of York constituency from 1883 to 1885. Milner, who led an 1888 presentation celebrating the achievements of both Sir Joseph (though he was absent due to illness) and Lady Terry, was described by The York Herald as having "had the privilege of Sir Joseph's friendship for many years".

Though it is ceremonial for the Lord Mayor of York to reside in the Mansion House, Terry maintained a house on Tadcaster Road, York, known as the "Hawthorn Villa". He also had a summer residence in the small town of Filey. This building was later renamed "Langford Villa" and was recognized as Grade II listed on 23 August 1985.

== By-election and death ==
Terry died of heart failure, induced by over-exertion, at the Royal Station Hotel on 12 January 1898, after attempting to win a by-election to become Member of Parliament for the City of York. The by-election was triggered by the death of incumbent Queen's Counsel and former Solicitor General Sir Frank Lockwood on 18 December 1897. If successful, he would have served as second member to John Butcher (later the 1st Baron Danesfort), whom he respected for his work within the constituency. Terry died one day before the announcement of the new member was made, and the election was eventually won by famed admiral and veteran MP Lord Charles Beresford by a mere eleven votes, in a controversial recount forced by a Parliamentary petition after he and Liberal candidate Sir Christopher Furness had both obtained 5,643 votes according to initial data. Terry was buried at the York Cemetery on 15 January 1898, where his monument comprised a large granite cross and a small apron of ground.

City of York by-election, 1898 (Note: Official sources produced long after the by-election exclusively cite the Liberal and Conservative parties as the sole contenders, accounting for roughly 92.9% of the total votes cast. However, at least a portion of the remaining 7.1% was claimed by the Independent Labour Party, who fielded Bradford born Russell Smart as their primary contender.)
Party	Candidate	Votes	%	±%
Conservative	Lord Charles Beresford	5,654	46.5	+11.5
Liberal	Sir Christopher Furness	5,643	46.4	−20.3
Majority		11	0.09	N/A
Turnout		12,157	75.8	
Conservative gain from Liberal		Swing	+2.5	

== Legacy ==
The Merchant Taylor Company of York, which Terry had chaired for many years, expressed condolences but made no donation to his memorial fund. It is thought that this decision was not made on principle as, two years earlier, donations of £5 had been made to the "Mansion House Fund" in memoriam to prolific clergyman James Raine, who was the company's established annual preacher and had died some years before the trust was founded in 1896. However, the national journal Chemist and Druggist: The Newsweekly for Pharmacy described Terry's passing as "a tragic feature of the recent by-election" and the Yorkshire Herald fondly remarked "There was no person in the city more loved or respected, and no-one who was more possessed of the qualities that constitute a genial and amiable Englishman". His personal estate amounted to £38,959 10s. 2d. upon his death.

Further positive affirmation came in the form of the construction of the "Terry Memorial Homes" in the Skeldergate area of York, on a section of the front gardens of the Dame Middleton Hospital. The charitable project was built through public subscription of a collective £1,020 in 1898 in honour of the former Lord Mayor; it consisted of two brick-built almshouses, intended for married couples over the age of 60, with the York Municipal Charity trustees having the administrative authority to accommodate or reject applicants for tenancy. On 14 March 1996, English Heritage designated the two houses as Grade II listed under the name "Terry Memorial Homes Numbers 1 and 2." £200 of the original subscription was invested in stocks, which yielded £6 when exchanged in 1955. Terry's armorial bearings are erected at the houses (which now serve as a hotel) and in stained glass at the All Saints' Church, North Street as of 1978, as Joseph's grandson, Noel Goddard Terry, had helped fund the restoration of the building.

== Arms ==
Coat of arms of Joseph Terry
Adopted 1887 Escutcheon Ermine, on a cross invected gules a fasces erect Or, between two roses in pale argent and as many lions passant in fess of the third.

== See also ==
- List of Lord Mayors of York
