= Richard White (16th century MP) =

English Member of Parliament

Member of the England Parliament for York
- In office 1554 (April) – 1554 (November)
- Preceded by: William Watson; William Holme
- Succeeded by: William Holme; William Coupland

Personal details
- Born: 1509
- Died: 1558 (aged 48–49)
- Spouse: Elizabeth

Richard White was one of two Members of the Parliament of England for the constituency of York for the short session between April and November 1554 .

== Life and politics ==
Richard was born in Edlingham in Northumberland. There is no record of who his parents were. He had a wife named Elizabeth.

He became a freeman of the city of York due to his trade as a tailor in 1529. He was made a master of the guild of tailor's and drapers guild. He lived in the parish of St Michael le Belfrey. He held several offices in the city. In 1537-38 he was a junior chamberlain and in 1544-45 he became sheriff. In 1549 he became an alderman, a position he retained until his death. He also became Lord mayor in 1552-53.

He became MP for the city in the short parliamentary session in 1554 between April and November after being chosen at meeting of the "TwentyFour" on the eighth of March 1554. This particular parliament was being held in Oxford. He and his colleague John Beane were fairly active in that time, securing a renewal of the city's charter and attempted to repeal the Edwardian Licensing Act.

He died in 1558 and his will showed how wealthy he had become by virtue of the number of properties he left. It was recorded that he had ten houses as well as several closes and leases. Among those leases was one for half of the Merchant Taylor's Hall. His main residence appeared to have been a house in Minster Gates. In his will he named as his heir his nine year old niece. He also left a sum of sixpence per week for prisoners in York castle.

Political offices
Preceded by William Watson; William Holme	Member of Parliament; 1554 (April) -1554(November)	Next: William Holme; William Coupland
