= John Norman (16th century MP) =

English Member of Parliament

Member of the England Parliament for York
- In office 1523 – 1525 (died)
- Preceded by: William Nelson; William Wright
- Succeeded by: George Gale; George Lawson

Personal details
- Born: 1483 York
- Died: 1525 (aged 41–42) York
- Resting place: All Saints' Church, Pavement, York
- Spouse(s): (1)Catherine (2)Jane (3)Anne Birley
- Children: George; Jane; Anne; Anthony

John Norman was one of two Members of the Parliament of England for the constituency of York on two occasions between 1523 and his death in 1525.

== Life and politics ==
John was born about 1483 to John and Agnes Norman. His father had moved to York from New Malton and was a sheriff of the city of York. By virtue of his father being a freeman, John also became a freeman in 1503 having entered the Merchant's Guild in 1501. He was very active in the guild, holding the ranks of constable and master. He twice represented the city's guild when called to London to answer complaints from the Hanseatic League. He is known to have conducted business in the Netherlands with his partner, Thomas Burton, who was also MP for the city at the same time as John. In 1524, he acquired the manor of South Duffield. He also acquired properties in Doncaster and Ripon as well as York.

Among the civic offices he held in York were senior chamberlain (1512–13), sheriff (1514–1515) and alderman in 1517 and again between 1521 and his death. He also became lord mayor of York in 1524. His spells as alderman were controversial when his first attempt was thwarted by William Nelson and resulted in a riot. His year as mayor was also controversial due to the conflict with the Merchants of the Staple.

John married three times and had two sons, George and Anthony, and two daughters, Jane and Anne. His son Anthony was to become contracted to marry the future wife of Archbishop Holgate and his daughter Jane married Richard Goldthorpe, who was MP for York in 1559. John died in 1525 and asked to be buried in All Saints' Church, Pavement, York.

Political offices
Preceded by William Nelson; William Wright	Member of Parliament; 1523–1525	Next: George Gale; George Lawson
