= William Coupland =

English Member of Parliament

Member of the England Parliament for York
- In office 1554 (November) – 1555
- Preceded by: John Beane; Richard White
- Succeeded by: William Holme; Reginald Beseley

Personal details
- Born: c. 1501
- Died: 1569
- Spouse: Elizabeth Ledale
- Relations: Christopher Ledale (Father-in-Law)
- Children: George + 2 other sons 3 daughters
- Parent: John Coupland (Father)

William Coupland (also recorded as Cowpland) was one of two Members of the Parliament of England for the constituency of York from the November 1554 session to 1555.

== Life and politics ==
William was the son of John Coupland. He married Elizabeth Ledale and had 3 sons and 3 daughters. Two of his daughters were married to sheriffs of the city.

He held several offices in the city. He was a muremaster who were responsible for collecting taxes for the upkeep of the city walls. He also was a junior chamberlain (1537–38); tax collector (1540); sheriff (1543–44); alderman (1549 until his death) and Lord mayor (1553-354 and again in 1568-69). Like his father he became a tailor and became a freeman of the city in 1522. He went on to become a trader in general merchandise while living in the parish of St. Sampsons'.

During his first term as Lord mayor, he was noted for taking firm action against trading irregularities. His second term was marred by Williams' house being used to place one William Hussey under house arrest for anti-Catholic talk.

William died in 1569 and was buried in St Sampson's church next to his first wife.

Political offices
Preceded by John Beane; Richard White	Member of Parliament; 1554(November) - 1555	Next: William Holme; Reginald Beseley
