= Thomas Dickenson =

English merchant and politician (fl. c. 1650)

Thomas Dickenson (Dickinson), a merchant of York, was an adherent of the Parliamentary cause during the English Civil War. He was also a sheriff, alderman, and twice Lord Mayor of York and a Member of Parliament for York during the Protectorate.

== Biography ==
Dickenson was Sheriff of York in 1640, twice Lord Mayor of York, in 1647 and again in 1657 the year he was knighted by the Lord Protector Oliver Cromwell. He was a Member of Parliament for York in the First, Second and Third Protectorate parliaments.

Although a strong partisan of Cromwell, Dickenson was probably moderate in his religious views; and, according to the testimony of a contemporary, more Episcopalian than Presbyterian or Independent. Dickenson was a patron of literary men. John Bulmer, M.D., dedicated to him his Anthropometamorphosis; or, Man Transformed, 4to, 1653; and the Rev. Josiah Hunter dedicated to him a Sermon on Philip iv. 5, 4to, 1656.
