= William Ormshead =

Member of the Parliament of England

Member of the England Parliament for York
- In office 1426–1431
- Preceded by: Richard Russell
- Succeeded by: William Ormshead
- In office 1431–Unknown
- Preceded by: William Ormshead
- Succeeded by: Thomas Scotton

Personal details
- Died: 1437
- Spouse(s): Agnes (I); Joan (II); Ellen (III)

William Ormshead was one of two Members of the Parliament of England for the constituency of York on two occasions.

== Life and politics ==
William was a successful merchant before any record of his life is known. He first comes to note when becoming a freeman of the city of York in 1404. By this time he had been married to Agnes, but seven years later he is recorded as being married to Joan when they both became members of the Corpus Christi Guild. He was married for a third time to Ellen. He had one son and two daughters. His sister, Margaret was married to fellow York merchant and MP, John Blackburn.

He held several civic offices. He was sheriff (1414–1415) and lord mayor (1425–26 and 1433–34). He was first elected as MP for York in 1421 and then again in 1426 and 1431. A wealthy wool merchant, he had property in Colliergate, Peasholm, Stonegate and Micklegate. He also had a small amount of property in Cumberland.

Ormshead died in 1437 and his will stated his wish to buried next to his second wife in Holy Trinity Church. He left the majority of his estate to his widow, on the condition she did not remarry, else it would go to his two daughters. There were provisions for his nephew, Nicholas Blackburn, and John Bolton, who had married his niece Alice.

Political offices
Preceded by Richard Russell	Member of Parliament; 1426–1431	Next: William Ormshead
Preceded by William Ormshead	Member of Parliament; 1431– Unknown	Next: Thomas Scotton
