= William Frost (MP) =

English Member of Parliament

William Frost (died c. 1408), of York, was an English merchant and Member of Parliament (MP).

By October 1390, Frost had married Isabel Gisburn, a daughter and coheiress of the York MP and merchant John Gisburn and his wife, Ellen.

He was a Member of the Parliament of England for City of York in 1399. He was Mayor of York 3 February 1396–8, 1400–4, 3 June 1406 – 3 February 1407.

Parliament of England
| Preceded by Unrecorded; Unrecorded | Member of Parliament for City of York; 1399; With: John Bolton | Succeeded by Unrecorded; Unrecorded |
