= John Ripon =

14th-century English Member of Parliament

John Ripon (fl. 1388) of York, was an English Member of Parliament (MP).

He was a Member of the Parliament of England for City of York September 1388. He was a son of Arnold Ripon. John married, by 1381, a woman named Agnes.
