= Robert Savage (MP) =

English Member of Parliament

Robert Savage (died 1399), of York, was an English Member of Parliament (MP).

He was a Member of the Parliament of England for City of York in February 1383 and 1386. He was the Mayor of the Calais Staple by July 1394, and Mayor of York 1384-5 and 1391-3.

Savage was the nephew, heir and protege of the merchant, William Savage, who Robert asked to be buried near. Robert married twice: a woman named Katherine, and by 1381 he had married Emma Vescy. They had three sons and one daughter.
