= William Alne =

Member of the Parliament of England

- Occupation: Merchant
- Known for: Member of Parliament for City of York

William Alne was an English merchant who was a Member of Parliament for City of York in May 1413 and March 1416. He was also bailiff, chamberlain, councillor, and sheriff of his native York, the first two positions also held by his father Richard Alne (died 1409).
