= George Gale (MP) =

16th-century English politician

Member of the England Parliament for York
- In office 1529–1542
- Preceded by: Peter Jackson
- Succeeded by: Robert Hall II

Lord Mayor of York
- In office 1534–1535
- Preceded by: John Hodgson
- Succeeded by: William Wright
- In office 1549–1550
- Preceded by: Robert Peacock
- Succeeded by: John Lewis

Personal details
- Born: 1490 Thirntoft, Scruton
- Died: July 1556 (aged 65–66) York
- Resting place: York Minster
- Spouse: Mary Lord
- Children: Robert Francis; Thomas; Ursula; Anne; Isabelle; Alice; Dorothy; Elizabeth
- Parent(s): Oliver Gale & Ellen Marshall
- Occupation: Officer of the Mint

George Gale (1490-1556) was Member of Parliament for York during the Parliaments of Henry VIII, notably the Reformation Parliament, and of Edward VI. He also held several important offices in the city of York and was the Great Great Grandfather of the antiquarian, Thomas Gale.

== Life ==
George was born to Oliver Gale and Ellen Marshall near the North Yorkshire village of Scruton around 1490, though there is no accurate record of his birth. At some point before 1526, there being no accurate record, he married Mary Lord of Kendall. They had two sons and six daughters. His eldest son, Francis, followed his father in becoming Treasurer of the York Royal Mint. His daughter Isabella married a future Mayor of York, Ralph Hall as did her sister Anne, who married Robert Peacock. His two youngest daughters also married well. Dorothy was wed to Thomas Fairfax, father of Thomas Fairfax, 1st Lord Fairfax of Cameron, and Ursula to Sir William Mallory.

He was made a freeman of the city of York around 1514–15 by way of his profession as a goldsmith. This profession led him to have special status as a master of mint. It is unclear whether this was for the Offices of the City, the Church of St Peter in York or for the King. By 1529 he had held the position of Sheriff and Alderman of the city. He was a member of the Corpus Christi Guild in York in 1511. He held the office of alderman in 1529, Sheriff 1530–31, Lord Mayor of York 1534–35 and again in 1549–50.

His business acumen had led to his prosperity and enabled him to acquire lands, such as the manor of Bardalgarth near Hull in 1530. By 1550, he had also acquired land in Humberton, Whenby, Hemingbrough, Scarborough and Stamford Bridge. To this he added Wilberfoss Priory in 1553 along with other lands and rectories in nearby parishes. This last purchase was connected to his sister-in-law, who had been the last Prioress at Wilberfoss. He also acquired Acomb Grange on the outskirts of the village of Acomb near York for his family home. The acquisition was a reversion of lease following the dissolution of the Hospital of St Leonard on those lands and in the city of York.

He died in July 1556 in York. Amongst his bequests in his will, he gave a lump sum and annual gift for the poor of the City as well as monies to pay for repair of local roads.

== Politics ==
He was elected to Parliament in a by-election in 1532-33 after the death of Peter Jackson, one of two Members for the Constituency. He was recorded as attending for most of the remainder of the Parliament, and was re-elected for the brief Parliament of 1536. He was not recorded as having sat in the 1539-40 Parliament, but was re-elected for his final term in 1542.

Political offices
| Preceded by Peter Jackson | Member of Parliament; 1529–1536, 1542–1544, | Next: Robert Hall II |
