= Thomas Beverley =

English politician

Thomas Beverley (fl. 1380–1421) was an English politician. He sat as MP for Cambridge in 1407 and 1415.

He also served as porter of Cambridge Castle, and keeper of the King's warren at Cambridge and Chesterton from 3 November 1393 till 8 April 1399; bailiff of Cambridge from September 1406 till 1407, and 1411 till 1412; tax collector of Cambridgeshire in July 1413; and alnager of Cambridgeshire and Huntingdonshire from 17 October 1413 till 17 November 1414.

Before Easter 1406, he married Isabel.
