= York (UK Parliament constituency) =

Parliamentary constituency in the United Kingdom, 1265–2010

City of York
- Former borough constituency for the House of Commons
- Boundary of City of York in North Yorkshire for the 2005 general election

- Location of North Yorkshire within England
- County: North Yorkshire
- Major settlements: York

1265–2010
- Seats: One
- Replaced by: York Central, York Outer

York was a constituency represented in the Parliament of England from 1265 until 1707, in the Parliament of Great Britain until 1801, and in the Parliament of the United Kingdom until 2010. It elected two Members of Parliament (MPs) until 1918, and one thereafter under the first-past-the-post electoral system. From 1997 to 2010 it was known as City of York.

== Boundaries ==
This constituency area tracked the municipal government area of York. Each general revision of English constituencies from 1885 onwards would redefine the York constituency to include any changes to the city council area since the previous revision.

Boundaries of the parliamentary borough / borough constituency of York / City of York
From	Legislation	Limits	Area	Notes
Medieval	Prescription	The ancient borough, or "city and liberty", of York.	2,720 acres (1,100 ha)	A freeman borough in which freedom of the city ("citizenship") could be acquired by patrimony (inheritance), servitude (apprenticeship) or purchase. The "city" was the medieval walled city, but the boundary of the surrounding "liberty" was uncertain. The Minster Yard, an extra-parochial place around York Minster, was excluded from the ancient and parliamentary borough, as was York Castle. Although the Ainsty to the west of the city was annexed to the county of the city in 1449 by letters patent, it was not annexed to the borough; patrimony or servitude in the Ainsty did not make one eligible for citizenship, and Ainsty forty shilling freeholders voted for Yorkshire MPs (confirmed in 1736) rather than York MPs. Freeholdings within the borough gave no franchise.
1832	Parliamentary Boundaries Act 1832	The ancient borough plus two extensions encompassing urbanised parts of the adjoining townships: one to the north, through Clifton and Heworth between the River Ouse and Tang Hall Beck; the other to the southeast through Fulford.	2,789 acres (1,129 ha)	The Parliamentary Boundaries Act specified the complete boundary explicitly, to resolve uncertainty over the extent of the "liberty", especially at the Knavesmire, unresolved until the Ordnance Survey mapped the area in detail in 1852.
1885	Redistribution of Seats Act 1885	The previous parliamentary borough of York plus the current (1884) boundaries of the municipal borough of York.	3,591 acres (1,453 ha)	The Representation of the People Act 1884 was a partial reform from a property-based franchise towards a residence-based one, with a grandfather clause protecting those who would otherwise have lost their vote. The broader municipal boundary defined the reformed franchise, while the older parliamentary boundary was for the grandfathered property owners.
1918	Representation of the People Act 1918	The current (1893) boundaries of the county borough and city of York, including York Castle.	3,730 acres (1,510 ha)	The representation was also reduced from two members to one. As late as 1951 there was uncertainty over whether the Municipal Corporations Act 1835 had brought the castle within the municipal borough (county borough from 1889); it was included explicitly by the 1918 act but implicitly by the 1948 act.
1950	Representation of the People Act 1948	The current (1937) boundaries of the county borough and city of York.	6,409 acres (2,594 ha)	Consequent on the Initial Review of Westminster constituencies
1964	Parliamentary Constituencies (Leeds, York and Barkston Ash) Order, 1960	The current (1957) boundaries of the county borough and city of York.	6,933 acres (2,806 ha)	Consequent on the 1959 report of the Boundary Commission for England
Feb. 1974	Parliamentary Constituencies (England) Order 1970	The current (1968) boundaries of the county borough and city of York.	2,946 hectares (7,280 acres)	Consequent on the Second Periodic Review of Westminster constituencies
1983	Parliamentary Constituencies (England) Order 1983	The current (1968) boundaries of the non-metropolitan district and city of York.	2,946 hectares (7,280 acres)	Consequent on the Third Periodic Review of Westminster constituencies
1997	Parliamentary Constituencies (England) Order 1995	The current (1968) boundaries of the non-metropolitan district and city of York.		Consequent on the Fourth Periodic Review of Westminster constituencies. The name of the constituency was also changed from "York" to "City of York". The non-metropolitan district of York was abolished in 1996 and subsumed into a new, larger, unitary authority named the City of York; however, this did not affect the parliamentary constituency boundary.

== History ==
By virtue of its importance, York was regularly represented in Parliament from an early date: it had been required to send delegates to the assembly of 1265, but no actual returns survive until the end of the 13th century. The structure of the civic government of the city provided the basis by which it elected its Parliamentary representatives. In the years following the city's Royal Charter, granted in the 1150s, power was held by a Lord Mayor and associated bailiffs. Further expansion of governance saw the establishment of coroners, sheriffs and aldermen. The appointment of twelve aldermen in 1399 led to the establishment of the City Council. Subsequently, other tiers of governance, such as the probi homines and the communitas, would eventually provide the bodies for the election of MPs. Those who occupied such positions were all freemen of the city and frequently came from the mercantile classes rather than the nobility, and were considered the electorate of the city. In the beginnings of the constituency this electorate was about twenty four, but had risen to around seventy five by 1690. Early in the 18th century, the number of freemen being made had increased significantly and this further increased the electorate. By the election of 1830, there were about 3,800 registered voters.

There was a period between 1581 and 1597 where elections were a two-stage process. In the first stage, member of the common chamber of the council and 50 freeholders cast votes and the top four contenders would progress to a second ballot. This ballot was conducted by the Lord Mayor and the aldermen and the top two would be returned as MPs. In 1597 this process was reduced to a single ballot whereby all of those in both the commons and assembly of York would cast two votes. The two contenders with the most votes were returned as MP. From 1628 the process became fully open, as previously the process had an element of pre-approval by the Lord mayor and the aldermen.

A borough constituency consisting of the city of York has been represented in every Parliament since the Model Parliament of 1295. Until 1918, it returned two MPs; since then it has returned one. Until 1997, when its official name became City of York with no boundary changes, the constituency was usually simply called York.

Following their review of parliamentary representation in North Yorkshire, the Boundary Commission for England recommended the creation of two new seats for the City of York. Both the City of York and Vale of York seats were abolished in 2010 and replaced by two new constituencies, namely York Central and York Outer.

== Members of Parliament ==
=== 1265-1660 ===
Parliament	First member	Second member
1294	Nicholas de Selby	Roger Basy
1297	John le Espicer	Nicholas Clarevaux
1297	John le Sezevaux	Gilbert de Arnald
1299	John de Askham	Andrew de Bolingbroke
1304	Thomas le Anguiler	John de Sezevaux
1305	John de Graham	Roger de Roston
1306	John de Askam	John de Sezevaux
1307	John de Askam	John de Ebor
1308	Thomas de Norfolk	Nicholas Grantbridge
1310	John de Graa	Thomas Aguiler
1311	Thomas de Alwerthorpe	John Segge
1312	Thomas de Redness	Nicholas Sezevaux
1313	Nicholas Sezevaux	John de Appelton
1314	John de Appelton	John de Ughtred
1318	John de Sexdecim Vallibus (Sezevaux)	Henry Calvert
1321	Henry Calvert	Thomas de Redness
1325	John de Askam	Simon de Kingston
1326	William de Redness	Henry de Bolton
1327	Thomas de Redness	Nicholas Sezevaux
1327	Richard Tannock	Thomas de Montefort
1328	William Fox	William de Baronia
1328	Thomas de Pontefract	John de Burton
1329	Thomas de Gargrave	John de Kyrkeby
1349	John de Womme	Richard de Saugerry
1340	Hamo Hassoy	Gilbert Picklinton
1341	Walter Keldsterne	Henry Golbeter
1341	Thomas fil Richard	John Ichon
1342	Henry Goldbeter	Walter Keldsterne
1344	Thomas de Redness	John de Heton
1346	John de Sherburne	Richard de Setterington
1347	William Graa	Walter Keldsterne
1348	William Graa	William Skipwith
1350	Roger Noringvill	Walter Kelletern
1352	Hugo de Miton	John de Creyke
1352	Hamo de Hessay	
1353	William Graa	Hamo de Hessay
1355	Roger de Normanville	William Graa
1359	Thomas Auguber	John de Sexdecim Vallibus (Sezevaux); Roger de Henningham
1360	John de Gisburn	
1360	William Graa	
1362	John de Allerton	Roger de Selby
1364	William Graa	Robert Hawton
1365	William Graa	John de Acastre
1369	William Graa	John de Acastre
1371	William Graa	
1372	William Graa	Robert Hawton
1373	John de Gisburn	John de Acastre
1376	Thomas Graa	John Eshton
1378	John de Acastre	Thomas Graa
1379	Thomas Graa	Roger de Moreton
1382	William Savage	William Selby
1383	Thomas Graa	William Selby
1384	Thomas Quixley	John Howden
1385	Thomas Graa	Thomas Howden
1386	Thomas Graa	Robert Savage
1388 (February)	Thomas Holme	John Howden
1388 (September)	John Ripon	John Howden
1390 (January)		
1390 (November)		
1391	William Selby	John Howden
1393	Thomas Graa	William Helmsley
1394	Thomas Graa	John __?
1395	Thomas Graa	William Selby
1397 (January)	Thomas Graa	William Selby
1397 (September)		
1399	William Frost	John Bolton
1401		
1402	Robert Talkan	Robert Ward
1404 (January)		
1404 (October)		
1406		
1407	Robert Talkan	John Bolton
1410		
1411		
1413 (February)		
1413 (May)	Thomas Santon	William Alne
1414 (April)		
1414 (November)	Robert Holme	John Northby
1415	John Morton	Richard Russell
1416 (March)	William Bowes	William Alne
1416 (October)		
1417	Thomas Santon	John Blackburn
1419	Thomas Gare	John Northby
1420	John Penrith	Henry Preston
1421 (May)	William Bowes	John Morton
1421 (December)	Thomas Gare	William Ormshead|
1422	William Bowes	Richard Russell
1425	Richard Russell	
1426	William Ormshead	
1431	William Ormshead	William Bowes
1492	Thomas Scotton	
1504	William Nelson	
1510	William Nelson	Brian Palmes
1512	William Nelson	Thomas Drawswerd
1515	William Nelson	William Wright
1523	Thomas Burton	John Norman
1529	Peter Jackson, died and replaced in January 1533 by George Gale	George Lawson
1536	George Gale	Sir George Lawson
1539	John Hogeson	William Tancred
1542	John Hogeson	George Gale
1545	John North	Robert Hall
1547	Thomas Gargrave	William Holme
1553 (March)	William Watson	William Holme
1553 (October)	John North	Robert Hall
1554 (April)	John Beane	Richard White
1554 (November)	William Holme	William Coupland
1555	William Holme	Reginald Beseley
1558	William Holme	Robert Paycock
1558–1559	William Watson	Richard Goldthorpe
1562 (December)	William Watson	Ralph Hall
1571 (March)	Ralph Hall	Hugh Graves
1572 (April)	Gregory Paycock, sick and replaced in February 1581 by Robert Askwith	Hugh Graves
1584	William Robinson	Robert Brooke
1586 (October)	William Hillard	Robert Brooke
1588 (November)	Robert Askwith	William Robinson
1593	Andrew Trewe	James Birkby
1597 (September)	James Birkby	Thomas Moseley
1601 (October)	Sir John Bennet	Henry Hall
1604	Robert Askwith	Christopher Brooke
1614	Robert Askwith	Christopher Brooke
1621	Sir Robert Askwith	Christopher Brooke
1624	Sir Arthur Ingram	Christopher Brooke
1625	Sir Arthur Ingram	Christopher Brooke
1626	Sir Arthur Ingram	Christopher Brooke
1628	Sir Arthur Ingram	Sir Thomas Savile replaced after petition by Thomas Hoyle
1629–1640	No Parliaments Summoned	

Short Parliament

- 1640: Sir Edward Osborne
- 1640: Sir Roger Jaques

Long Parliament

- 1640-1653: Sir William Allanson (Parliamentarian)
- 1640-1650: Thomas Hoyle (Parliamentarian) - died January 1650

Barebones Parliament

- 1653: Thomas St. Nicholas

First Protectorate Parliament

- 1654-1655: Sir Thomas Widdrington
- 1654-1655: Thomas Dickenson

Second Protectorate Parliament

- 1656: Sir Thomas Widdrington (Elected for more than one constituency, and did not sit for York in this Parliament)
- 1656-1658: John Geldart
- 1656-1658: Thomas Dickenson

Third Protectorate Parliament

- 1659: Christopher Topham
- 1659: Thomas Dickenson

Long Parliament (restored)

- 1659-1660: Sir William Allanson; Thomas Hoyle, died, one seat vacant

=== 1660-1918 ===
Election	1st member	1st party	2nd member	2nd party
1660	Sir Thomas Widdrington		Sir Metcalfe Robinson	
1661	Colonel John Scott		Sir Metcalfe Robinson	
1665	Sir Thomas Osborne		Sir Metcalfe Robinson	
1673	Sir Henry Thompson		Sir Metcalfe Robinson	
1679	Sir Henry Thompson	Whig	Sir John Hewley	Whig
1685	Sir John Reresby	Tory	Sir Metcalfe Robinson	
1689	Viscount Dunblane	Tory	Edward Thompson	
1690	Robert Waller		Henry Thompson	
1695	Edward Thompson		Tobias Jenkins	
1698	Sir William Robinson		Tobias Jenkins	
January 1701	Sir William Robinson		Edward Thompson	
December 1701	Sir William Robinson		Tobias Jenkins	
1705	Sir William Robinson		Robert Benson	
1713	Sir William Robinson		Robert Fairfax	
1715	Sir William Robinson		Tobias Jenkins	
1722	Sir William Milner, 1st Baronet		Edward Thompson	
1734	Sir John Lister Kaye		Edward Thompson	
1741	Godfrey Wentworth		Edward Thompson	
1742	Godfrey Wentworth		George Fox	Tory
1747	William Thornton		George Fox	Tory
1754	Sir John Armytage		George Fox	Tory
1758	William Thornton		George Fox	Tory
1761	Sir George Armytage		Robert Fox-Lane	
1768	Charles Turner		Lord John Cavendish	Whig
1783	The Viscount Galway	Tory	Lord John Cavendish	Whig
1784	The Viscount Galway	Tory	Richard Slater Milnes	Tory
1790	Sir William Mordaunt Milner	Whig	Richard Slater Milnes	Tory
1802	Sir William Mordaunt Milner	Whig	Lawrence Dundas	Whig
1807	Sir William Mordaunt Milner	Whig	Sir Mark Masterman-Sykes	Tory
1811	Lawrence Dundas	Whig	Sir Mark Masterman-Sykes	Tory
March 1820	Lawrence Dundas	Whig	Marmaduke Wyvill	Whig
June 1820	Robert Chaloner	Whig	Marmaduke Wyvill	Whig
1826	James Wilson	Tory	Marmaduke Wyvill	Whig
1830	Hon. Thomas Dundas	Whig	Samuel Adlam Bayntun	Tory
1832	Hon. Edward Petre	Whig	Samuel Adlam Bayntun	Tory
1833	Hon. Edward Petre	Whig	Hon. Thomas Dundas	Whig
1835	Hon. John Dundas	Whig	John Lowther	Conservative
1841	Henry Redhead Yorke	Whig	John Lowther	Conservative
1847	Henry Redhead Yorke	Whig	John George Smyth	Conservative
1848	William Milner	Whig	John George Smyth	Conservative
1857	Joshua Westhead	Whig	John George Smyth	Conservative
1859	Joshua Westhead	Liberal	John George Smyth	Conservative
1865	George Leeman	Liberal	James Lowther	Conservative
1868	Joshua Westhead	Liberal	James Lowther	Conservative
1871	George Leeman	Liberal	James Lowther	Conservative
1880	Joseph Johnson Leeman	Liberal	Ralph Creyke	Liberal
1883	Sir Frederick Milner	Conservative	Ralph Creyke	Liberal
1885	Alfred Pease	Liberal	Frank Lockwood	Liberal
1892	John Butcher	Conservative	Frank Lockwood	Liberal
1898	John Butcher	Conservative	Admiral Lord Charles Beresford	Conservative
1900	John Butcher	Conservative	Denison Faber	Conservative
1906	Hamar Greenwood	Liberal	Denison Faber	Conservative
January 1910	Arnold Rowntree	Liberal	John Butcher	Conservative
1918	Representation reduced to one member			

=== 1918–2010 ===
Election	Member	Party
1918	John Butcher	Conservative
1923	Sir John Marriott	Conservative
1929	Frederick George Burgess	Labour
1931	Roger Lumley	Conservative
1937 by-election	Charles Wood	Conservative
1945	John Corlett	Labour
1950	Sir Harry Hylton-Foster	Conservative
1959	Charles Longbottom	Conservative
1966	Alex Lyon	Labour
1983	Conal Gregory	Conservative
1992	Sir Hugh Bayley	Labour
2010	constituency abolished: see York Central and York Outer	

== Elections ==
=== Elections in the 1830s ===
General election 1830: York (2 seats)
Party	Candidate	Votes	%
Tory	Samuel Adlam Bayntun	1,928	34.3
Whig	Thomas Dundas	1,907	33.9
Whig	Edward Petre	1,792	31.8
Turnout		3,725	c. 98.0
Registered electors		c. 3,800	
Majority		21	0.4
Tory hold			
Majority		115	2.1
Whig hold			

General election 1831: York (2 seats)
Party	Candidate	Votes	%
Tory	Samuel Adlam Bayntun	Unopposed	
Whig	Thomas Dundas	Unopposed	
Registered electors		c. 3,800	
Tory hold			
Whig hold			

General election 1832: York (2 seats)
Party	Candidate	Votes	%
Whig	Edward Petre	1,505	34.2
Tory	Samuel Adlam Bayntun	1,140	25.9
Tory	John Lowther	884	20.1
Whig	Thomas Dundas	872	19.8
Turnout		2,652	92.3
Registered electors		2,873	
Majority		365	8.3
Whig hold			
Majority		256	5.8
Tory hold			

Bayntun's death caused a by-election.

By-election, 11 November 1833: York
Party	Candidate	Votes	%	±%
Whig	Thomas Dundas	1,337	61.2	+7.2
Tory	John Lowther	846	38.8	−7.2
Majority		491	22.4	+14.1
Turnout		2,183	75.5	−16.8
Registered electors		2,890		
Whig gain from Tory		Swing	+7.2	

- Lowther was not present for the election, as he was in France

General election 1835: York (2 seats)
Party	Candidate	Votes	%	±%
Conservative	John Lowther	1,499	40.3	−5.7
Whig	John Dundas	1,301	35.0	+0.8
Whig	Charles Francis Barkley	919	24.7	+4.9
Turnout		2,546	88.1	−4.2
Registered electors		2,890		
Majority		198	5.3	−0.5
Conservative hold		Swing	−5.7	
Majority		382	10.3	+2.0
Whig hold		Swing	+1.8	

General election 1837: York (2 seats)
Party	Candidate	Votes	%	±%
Conservative	John Lowther	1,461	37.3	+17.2
Whig	John Dundas	1,276	32.6	−27.1
Conservative	David Francis Atcherley	1,180	30.1	+10.0
Turnout		2,468	87.2	−0.9
Registered electors		2,829		
Majority		185	4.7	−0.6
Conservative hold		Swing	+15.4	
Majority		96	2.5	−7.8
Whig hold		Swing	−27.2	

=== Elections in the 1840s ===
General election 1841: York (2 seats)
Party	Candidate	Votes	%	±%
Conservative	John Lowther	1,625	35.1	−2.2
Whig	Henry Redhead Yorke	1,552	33.5	+0.9
Conservative	David Francis Atcherley	1,456	31.4	+1.3
Turnout		2,993	85.3	−1.9
Registered electors		3,507		
Majority		73	1.6	−3.1
Conservative hold		Swing	−1.3	
Majority		96	2.1	−0.4
Whig hold		Swing	+0.9	

General election 1847: York (2 seats)
Party	Candidate	Votes	%	±%
Conservative	John George Smyth	Unopposed		
Whig	Henry Redhead Yorke	Unopposed		
Registered electors		4,047		
Conservative hold				
Whig hold				

Yorke's death caused a by-election.

By-election, 24 May 1848: York
Party	Candidate	Votes	%	±%
Whig	William Milner	1,505	62.1	N/A
Chartist	Henry Vincent	860	35.5	New
Radical	Charles Wilkins	57	2.4	N/A
Majority		645	26.6	N/A
Turnout		2,422	58.0	N/A
Registered electors		4,178		
Whig hold		Swing	N/A	

=== Elections in the 1850s ===
General election 1852: York (2 seats)
Party	Candidate	Votes	%	±%
Conservative	John George Smyth	1,870	40.8	N/A
Whig	William Milner	1,831	39.9	N/A
Chartist	Henry Vincent	886	19.3	N/A
Turnout		2,294 (est)	55.5 (est)	N/A
Registered electors		4,133		
Majority		39	0.9	N/A
Conservative hold		Swing	N/A	
Majority		945	20.6	N/A
Whig hold		Swing	N/A	

General election 1857: York (2 seats)
Party	Candidate	Votes	%	±%
Whig	Joshua Westhead	1,548	37.9	−2.0
Conservative	John George Smyth	1,530	37.5	−3.3
Radical	Malcolm Lewin	1,006	24.6	+5.3
Turnout		2,042 (est)	48.2 (est)	−7.3
Registered electors		4,236		
Majority		18	0.4	−20.2
Whig hold		Swing	+0.7	
Majority		524	12.9	+12.0
Conservative hold		Swing	−0.7	

General election 1859: York (2 seats)
Party	Candidate	Votes	%	±%
Liberal	Joshua Westhead	1,875	34.8	−3.1
Conservative	John George Smyth	1,805	33.5	−4.0
Liberal	Austen Henry Layard	1,706	31.7	+7.1
Turnout		2,693 (est)	61.8 (est)	+13.6
Registered electors		4,355		
Majority		70	1.3	+0.9
Liberal hold		Swing	−0.6	
Majority		99	1.8	−11.1
Conservative hold		Swing	−4.0	

=== Elections in the 1860s ===
General election 1865: York (2 seats)
Party	Candidate	Votes	%	±%
Conservative	James Lowther	2,079	36.3	+2.8
Liberal	George Leeman	1,854	32.4	+0.7
Liberal	Joshua Westhead	1,792	31.3	−3.5
Majority		225	3.9	+2.1
Turnout		3,902 (est)	91.2 (est)	+29.4
Registered electors		4,277		
Conservative hold		Swing	+2.8	
Liberal hold		Swing	−0.4	

General election 1868: York (2 seats)
Party	Candidate	Votes	%	±%
Conservative	James Lowther	3,735	37.2	+0.9
Liberal	Joshua Westhead	3,279	32.6	+1.3
Liberal	John Hall Gladstone	3,038	30.2	−2.2
Majority		456	4.6	+0.7
Turnout		6,894 (est)	75.9 (est)	−15.3
Registered electors		9,088		
Conservative hold		Swing	+0.7	
Liberal hold		Swing	+0.4	

=== Elections in the 1870s ===
Westhead resigned, causing a by-election.

By-election, 14 February 1871: York (1 seat)
Party	Candidate	Votes	%	±%
Liberal	George Leeman	Unopposed		
Liberal hold				

General election 1874: York (2 seats)
Party	Candidate	Votes	%	±%
Liberal	George Leeman	3,880	38.5	−24.3
Conservative	James Lowther	3,371	33.4	+14.8
Conservative	Lewis Payn Dawnay	2,830	28.1	+9.5
Majority		509	5.1	+0.5
Turnout		6,981 (est)	71.6 (est)	−4.3
Registered electors		9,744		
Liberal hold		Swing	−18.2	
Conservative hold		Swing	+13.5	

Lowther was appointed Chief Secretary to the Lord Lieutenant of Ireland, requiring a by-election.

By-election, 20 February 1878: York (1 seat)
Party	Candidate	Votes	%	±%
Conservative	James Lowther	Unopposed		
Conservative hold				

=== Elections in the 1880s ===
General election 1880: York (2 seats)
Party	Candidate	Votes	%	±%
Liberal	Ralph Creyke	4,505	35.0	+15.7
Liberal	Joseph Johnson Leeman	4,413	34.3	+15.0
Conservative	James Lowther	3,959	30.7	−30.8
Majority		546	4.3	N/A
Turnout		8,465 (est)	77.2 (est)	+5.6
Registered electors		10,971		
Liberal hold		Swing	+15.6	
Liberal gain from Conservative		Swing	+15.2	

Leeman's death caused a by-election.

By-election, 23 November 1883: York (1 seat)
Party	Candidate	Votes	%	±%
Conservative	Frederick Milner	3,948	50.1	+19.4
Liberal	Frank Lockwood	3,927	49.9	−19.4
Majority		21	0.2	N/A
Turnout		7,875	69.1	−8.1 (est)
Registered electors		11,395		
Conservative gain from Liberal		Swing	+19.4	

Lockwood

General election 1885: York (2 seats)
Party	Candidate	Votes	%	±%
Liberal	Alfred Pease	5,353	27.3	−7.7
Liberal	Frank Lockwood	5,260	26.9	−7.4
Conservative	Frederick Milner	4,590	23.4	−7.3
Conservative	James Legard	4,377	22.4	N/A
Majority		670	3.5	−0.8
Turnout		9,849	79.3	+2.1 (est)
Registered electors		12,415		
Liberal hold		Swing	−2.0	
Liberal hold		Swing	−1.9	

General election 1886: York (2 seats)
Party	Candidate	Votes	%	±%
Liberal	Alfred Pease	4,816	26.4	−0.9
Liberal	Frank Lockwood	4,810	26.3	−0.6
Conservative	James Legard	4,352	23.8	+1.4
Liberal Unionist	John Charles Dundas	4,295	23.5	+1.1
Majority		458	2.5	−1.0
Turnout		9,213	74.2	−5.1
Registered electors		12,415		
Liberal hold		Swing	−2.2	
Liberal hold		Swing	−0.9	

=== Elections in the 1890s ===
General election 1892: York (2 seats)
Party	Candidate	Votes	%	±%
Conservative	John Butcher	5,076	34.0	+10.2
Liberal	Frank Lockwood	5,030	33.6	+7.3
Liberal	Alfred Pease	4,846	32.4	+6.0
Majority		230	1.6	N/A
Turnout		9,906	90.0	+15.8
Registered electors		11,005		
Conservative gain from Liberal		Swing	+2.1	
Liberal hold		Swing	N/A	

Lockwood was appointed Solicitor General for England and Wales, requiring a by-election.

By-election, 14 November 1894: York (1 seat)
Party	Candidate	Votes	%	±%
Liberal	Frank Lockwood	Unopposed		
Liberal hold				

General election 1895: York (2 seats)
Party	Candidate	Votes	%	±%
Conservative	John Butcher	5,516	34.4	+0.4
Liberal	Frank Lockwood	5,309	33.1	−0.5
Liberal	Alfred Pease	5,214	32.5	+0.1
Majority		302	1.9	+0.3
Turnout		10,701	90.6	+0.6
Registered electors		11,807		
Conservative hold		Swing	+0.2	
Liberal hold		Swing	N/A	

Lockwood's death caused a by-election.

Furness

By-election, 13 January 1898: York (1 seat)
Party	Candidate	Votes	%	±%
Conservative	Charles Beresford	5,643	50.0	+15.6
Liberal	Christopher Furness	5,643	50.0	−15.6
Majority		0	0.0	−1.9
Turnout		11,286	92.8	+2.2
Registered electors		12,157		
Conservative hold		Swing	+15.6	

This result was subject to a recount, with the original result putting Beresford on 5,659 votes, and Furness with 5,648 votes. The recount then led to the above result. 17 ballot papers were reserved for judgement, of which 12 were in favour of Beresford. Beresford was told he was able to substantiate 11 ballot papers, while Furness was given an estimate of four, leading to Beresford being declared MP.

=== Elections in the 1900s ===
1900 York by-election
Party	Candidate	Votes	%	±%
Conservative	Denison Faber	6,248	56.5	+22.1
Liberal	Alexander Murray	4,818	43.5	−22.1
Majority		1,430	13.0	+11.1
Turnout		11,066	88.0	−2.6
Registered electors		12,582		
Conservative hold		Swing	+22.1	

General election 1900: York (2 seats)
Party	Candidate	Votes	%	±%
Conservative	Denison Faber	Unopposed		
Conservative	John Butcher	Unopposed		
Conservative hold				
Conservative hold				

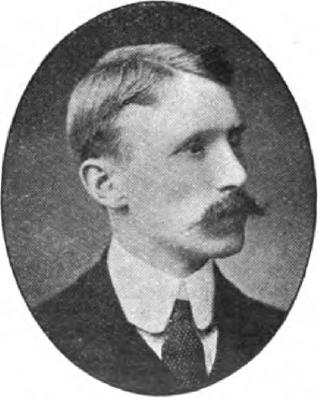
Stuart

General election 1906: York (2 seats)
Party	Candidate	Votes	%	±%
Liberal	Hamar Greenwood	6,413	27.7	New
Conservative	Denison Faber	6,108	26.3	N/A
Conservative	John Butcher	6,094	26.3	N/A
Labour Repr. Cmte.	George Stuart	4,573	19.7	New
Turnout		23,188	93.0	N/A
Registered electors		13,864		
Majority		319	1.4	N/A
Liberal gain from Conservative		Swing	N/A	
Majority		1,535	6.6	N/A
Conservative hold		Swing	N/A	

=== Elections in the 1910s ===
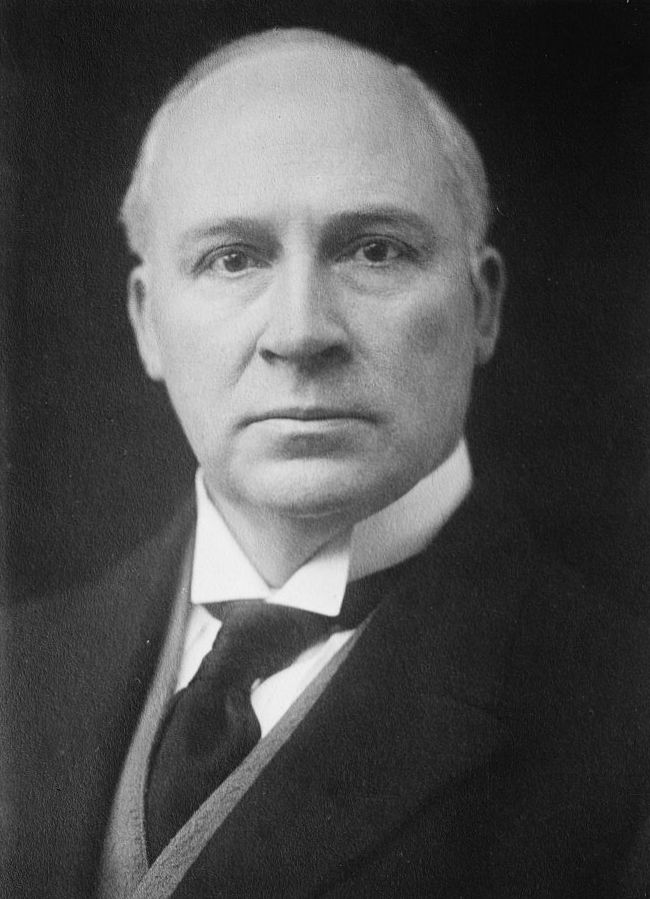
Greenwood

General election January 1910: York (2 seats)
Party	Candidate	Votes	%	±%
Liberal	Arnold Rowntree	6,751	25.4	+11.5'"`UNIQ−−ref−00000122−QINU`"'
Conservative	John Butcher	6,741	25.3	−1.0
Liberal	Hamar Greenwood	6,632	24.9	+11.0'"`UNIQ−−ref−00000123−QINU`"'
Conservative	HH Riley-Smith	6,495	24.4	−1.9
Turnout		26,619	95.3	+2.3
Registered electors		14,065		
Majority		256	1.0	−0.4
Liberal hold		Swing	+6.3	
Majority		109	0.4	−6.2
Conservative hold		Swing	−6.0	

Rowntree

General election December 1910: York (2 seats)
Party	Candidate	Votes	%	±%
Conservative	John Butcher	Unopposed		
Liberal	Arnold Rowntree	Unopposed		
Conservative hold				
Liberal hold				

General Election 1914–15:

Another General Election was required to take place before the end of 1915. The political parties had been making preparations for an election to take place and by July 1914, the following candidates had been selected;

- Unionist: John Butcher
- Liberal: Arnold Rowntree
- Labour: Henry Slesser
- Representation reduced to one

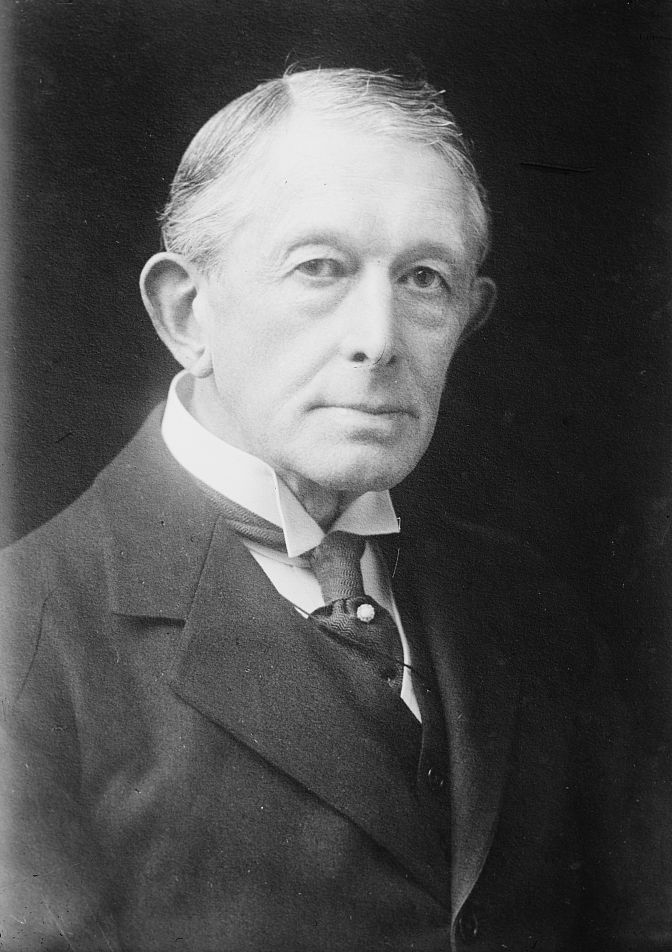
Butcher

General election 1918: York
Party		Candidate	Votes	%	±%
C	Unionist	John Butcher	16,269	61.5	N/A
	Liberal	Arnold Rowntree	5,363	20.3	N/A
	Labour	Harry Gill	4,822	18.2	New
Majority			10,906	41.2	N/A
Turnout			26,454	69.0	N/A
	Unionist hold		Swing	N/A	
C indicates candidate endorsed by the coalition government.

=== Elections in the 1920s ===
General election 1922: York
Party	Candidate	Votes	%	±%
Unionist	John Butcher	15,163	44.5	−17.0
Labour	Harry Gill	10,106	29.6	+11.4
Liberal	Elliott Dodds	8,838	25.9	+5.6
Majority		5,057	14.9	−26.3
Turnout		34,107	85.8	+16.8
Unionist hold		Swing		

General election 1923: York
Party	Candidate	Votes	%	±%
Unionist	John Marriott	14,772	43.4	−1.1
Labour	Joseph King	11,626	34.2	+4.6
Liberal	Elliott Dodds	7,638	22.4	−3.5
Majority		3,146	9.2	−5.7
Turnout		34,036	82.8	−3.0
Unionist hold		Swing		

General election 1924: York
Party	Candidate	Votes	%	±%
Unionist	John Marriott	19,914	56.2	+12.8
Labour	David Adams	15,500	43.8	+9.6
Majority		4,414	12.4	+3.2
Turnout		35,414	84.8	+2.0
Unionist hold		Swing	+1.6	

General election 1929: York
Party	Candidate	Votes	%	±%
Labour	Frederick Burgess	20,663	45.0	+1.2
Unionist	John Marriott	17,363	37.8	−18.4
Liberal	Douglas Crockatt	7,907	17.2	New
Majority		3,300	7.2	N/A
Turnout		45,933	85.1	+0.3
Labour gain from Unionist		Swing	+9.8	

=== Elections in the 1930s ===
General election 1931: York
Party	Candidate	Votes	%	±%
Conservative	Roger Lumley	30,216	64.94	
Labour	Frederick Burgess	16,310	35.06	
Majority		13,906	29.88	N/A
Turnout		46,526	85.98	
Conservative gain from Labour		Swing		

General election 1935: York
Party	Candidate	Votes	%	±%
Conservative	Roger Lumley	25,442	57.03	
Labour	Robert Fraser	19,168	42.97	
Majority		6,274	14.06	
Turnout		44,610	82.50	
Conservative hold		Swing		

1937 York by-election
Party	Candidate	Votes	%	±%
Conservative	Charles Wood	22,045	55.07	−1.96
Labour	John Dugdale	17,986	44.93	+1.96
Majority		4,059	10.14	−3.92
Turnout		40,031		
Conservative hold		Swing		

=== Election in the 1940s ===
General election 1945: York
Party	Candidate	Votes	%	±%
Labour	John Corlett	22,021	49.85	
Conservative	Lord Irwin	17,949	40.63	
Liberal	Gilbert Henry Keighley-Bell	4,208	9.53	New
Majority		4,072	9.22	N/A
Turnout		44,178	76.23	
Labour gain from Conservative		Swing		

=== Elections in the 1950s ===
General election 1950: York
Party	Candidate	Votes	%	±%
Conservative	Harry Hylton-Foster	29,421	46.31	
Labour	Haydn Davies	29,344	46.19	
Liberal	Howard Snow Clay	4,760	7.49	
Majority		77	0.12	N/A
Turnout		63,525	87.59	
Conservative gain from Labour		Swing		

General election 1951:York
Party	Candidate	Votes	%	±%
Conservative	Harry Hylton-Foster	32,777	50.71	
Labour	Thomas Skeffington-Lodge	31,856	49.29	
Majority		921	1.42	
Turnout		64,633	86.37	
Conservative hold		Swing		

General election 1955:York
Party	Candidate	Votes	%	±%
Conservative	Harry Hylton-Foster	31,402	50.89	
Labour	Thomas McKitterick	30,298	49.11	
Majority		1,104	1.78	
Turnout		61,700	83.55	
Conservative hold		Swing		

General election 1959: York
Party	Candidate	Votes	%	±%
Conservative	Charles Longbottom	33,099	53.28	
Labour	Douglas Poirier	29,025	46.72	
Majority		4,074	6.56	
Turnout		62,124	84.27	
Conservative hold		Swing		

=== Elections in the 1960s ===
General election 1964: York
Party	Candidate	Votes	%	±%
Conservative	Charles Longbottom	26,521	44.56	
Labour	Alex Lyon	25,428	42.73	
Liberal	Denis T. Lloyd	7,565	12.71	New
Majority		1,093	1.83	
Turnout		51,949	82.98	
Conservative hold		Swing		

General election 1966: York
Party	Candidate	Votes	%	±%
Labour	Alex Lyon	32,167	55.24	
Conservative	Charles Longbottom	26,067	44.76	
Majority		6,100	10.48	N/A
Turnout		58,234	82.68	
Labour gain from Conservative		Swing		

=== Elections in the 1970s ===
General election 1970: York
Party	Candidate	Votes	%	±%
Labour	Alex Lyon	29,619	51.93	
Conservative	Bryan Askew	27,422	48.07	
Majority		2,197	3.84	
Turnout		57,041	76.25	
Labour hold		Swing		

General election February 1974: York
Party	Candidate	Votes	%	±%
Labour	Alex Lyon	25,674	40.55	
Conservative	John Watson	24,843	39.24	
Liberal	Steve Galloway	12,793	20.21	New
Majority		831	1.31	
Turnout		63,310	82.75	
Labour hold		Swing		

General election October 1974: York
Party	Candidate	Votes	%	±%
Labour	Alex Lyon	26,983	46.42	
Conservative	John Watson	23,294	40.08	
Liberal	Elizabeth Graham	7,370	12.68	
More Prosperous Britain	Harold Smith	304	0.52	New
Protest Party	H.L. Stratton	171	0.29	New
Majority		3,689	6.34	
Turnout		58,122	75.31	
Labour hold		Swing		

General election 1979: York
Party	Candidate	Votes	%	±%
Labour	Alex Lyon	26,703	44.73	
Conservative	E.D.M. Tod	25,453	42.64	
Liberal	M. Pemberton	6,752	11.31	
Christian Stop Abortion	F.C.J. Radcliffe	569	0.95	New
National Front	P.A. Spink	221	0.37	New
Majority		1,250	2.09	
Turnout		59,698	77.70	
Labour hold		Swing		

=== Elections in the 1980s ===
General election 1983: York
Party	Candidate	Votes	%	±%
Conservative	Conal Gregory	24,309	41.31	
Labour	Alex Lyon	20,662	35.11	
SDP	Vince Cable	13,523	22.98	
Independent	Anthony J. Lister	204	0.35	New
BNP	Thomas G. Brattan	148	0.25	New
Majority		3,647	6.20	N/A
Turnout		58,846	75.14	
Conservative gain from Labour		Swing		

General election 1987: York
Party	Candidate	Votes	%	±%
Conservative	Conal Gregory	25,880	41.64	+0.33
Labour	Hugh Bayley	25,733	41.41	+6.29
SDP	Vince Cable	9,898	15.93	−7.05
Green	Alan Dunnett	637	1.02	New
Majority		147	0.23	−5.97
Turnout		62,148	78.37	+3.23
Conservative hold		Swing	−2.98	

=== Elections in the 1990s ===
General election 1992: York
Party	Candidate	Votes	%	±%
Labour	Hugh Bayley	31,525	49.1	+7.7
Conservative	Conal Gregory	25,183	39.2	−2.4
Liberal Democrats	Karen Anderson	6,811	10.6	−5.3
Green	Stephen Kenwright	594	0.9	−0.1
Natural Law	Pamela Orr	54	0.1	New
Majority		6,342	9.9	N/A
Turnout		64,167	81.0	+2.6
Labour gain from Conservative		Swing	+5.1	

General election 1997: City of York
Party	Candidate	Votes	%	±%
Labour	Hugh Bayley	34,956	59.9	+10.8
Conservative	Simon Mallett	14,433	24.7	−14.5
Liberal Democrats	Andrew Waller	6,537	11.2	+0.6
Referendum	Jonathan Sheppard	1,083	1.9	New
Green	Mark Hill	880	1.5	+0.6
UKIP	Eric Wegener	319	0.6	New
Independent	Andrew Lightfoot	137	0.2	New
Majority		20,523	35.2	+25.3
Turnout		58,345	73.2	−7.8
Labour hold		Swing	+12.6	

=== Elections in the 2000s ===
General election 2001: City of York
Party	Candidate	Votes	%	±%
Labour	Hugh Bayley	25,072	52.3	−7.6
Conservative	Michael McIntyre	11,293	23.5	−1.2
Liberal Democrats	Andrew Waller	8,519	17.8	+6.6
Green	Bill Shaw	1,465	3.1	+1.6
Socialist Alliance	Frank Ormston	674	1.4	New
UKIP	Richard Bate	576	1.2	+0.6
Monster Raving Loony	Eddie Vee	381	0.8	New
Majority		13,779	28.8	−6.4
Turnout		47,980	59.0	−14.2
Labour hold		Swing	−3.2	

General election 2005: City of York
Party	Candidate	Votes	%	±%
Labour	Hugh Bayley	21,836	46.9	−5.4
Conservative	Clive Booth	11,364	24.4	+0.9
Liberal Democrats	Andrew Waller	10,166	21.8	+4.0
Green	Andy D'Agorne	2,113	4.5	+1.4
UKIP	Richard Jackson	832	1.8	+0.6
Independent	Ken Curran	121	0.3	New
Death, Dungeons and Taxes Party	Damien Fleck	93	0.2	New
Independent	Andrew Hinkles	72	0.2	New
Majority		10,472	22.5	−6.3
Turnout		46,597	61.7	+2.7
Labour hold		Swing	−3.2	

== See also ==
- List of parliamentary constituencies in North Yorkshire

== Sources ==
- Corbett, Uvedale (1826). An inquiry into the elective franchise of the freeholders of, and the rights of election for, the corporate countries in England and Wales ... London: J. & W. T. Clarke.
- Tillott, P. M., ed. (1961). A History of the County of York: the City of York. London: Victoria County Histories – via British History Online.
