= James Meek of York =

James Meek (1790–1862) was a Victorian Wesleyan Methodist, Whig politician, currier, glassmaker, and three times Lord Mayor of York.

He was also the middle one (James Meek II) of three James Meeks who are important in the history of York. His father (James Meek I) came to York from Brompton by Northallerton, where he had run a starch mill. He was an Anglican and was also at Kelfield, North Yorkshire.

James Meek II was born in 1790 in Brompton, Northallerton; he came to York in 1803 to serve an apprenticeship with Joseph Agar, currier (leathermaker). After working in various cities he returned to York on his marriage, setting up his own business in Goodramgate, York. He was a partner in the York Flint Glass Company and chairman of York City and County Bank. For a time he was also chairman of Hudson's York and North Midland Railway and of the Newcastle and Berwick Railway, but as a staunch Methodist, he resigned in a controversy regarding Sunday travel on the railway. He laid the foundation stone of the York cemetery chapel during his first term as Lord Mayor.

He was Lord Mayor of York in 1836, 1848 and 1850, the final time being immediately before George Hudson. He was also Sheriff of York in 1827 and was an Alderman of the city from 1835 until his death.

== His son, James Meek III or Sir James Meek ==
Sir James Meek (1815–1891) was the son of James Meek II. He succeeded to his father's business interests and was also a Wesleyan Methodist. However, in 1853 he became a Primitive Methodist in 1853 and an active member of Little Stonegate Chapel, York. He was Lord Mayor of York in 1855, 1865, and 1866 and was also instrumental in establishing Elmfield College.

James Meek III was a Liberal councillor for Bootham Ward from 1849 to 1853, and an Alderman in 1853. He went up to St John's College Cambridge in 1837 and then joined his father's firm

James III was chairman of York City and County Bank, Governor of Bootham Asylum, treasurer of the York Mission. He was also a freemason in the York Lodge No. 236, Worshipful Master 1864, and a major commandant of the 1st West Yorkshire Rifle Volunteers. In 1869 he was "knighted, somewhat belatedly, for his hospitality to the Prince and Princess of Wales on their visit to York in August 1866 when they attended the Yorkshire Fine Art and Industrial Exhibition in the grounds of Bootham Park Hospital, the annual show of the Yorkshire Agricultural Society and the Great Volunteer Review of 21,000 troops, both on the Knavesmire".

His son James Matthew Meek (born 1848) went to Trinity College. His other sons were William A. MEEK (1868) and Siward W. MEEK (1884) (Scott, MSS.; Law Lists; The Times 1927:10:25)

== Middlethorpe Lodge ==
James Meek II and James Meek III both lived at Middlethorpe Lodge near York. In 1885 James Meek III left York for Cheltenham, where he died in 1885.
