= William Holme =

MP for York between 1547 and 1558

Member of the England Parliament for York
- In office 1547–1553
- Preceded by: John North; Robert Hall
- Succeeded by: William Watson
- In office 1553–1554
- Preceded by: Thomas Gargrave
- Succeeded by: John North; Robert Hall
- In office 1554–1555
- Preceded by: John Beane; Richard White
- Succeeded by: Reginald Beseley
- In office 1555–1558
- Preceded by: Reginald Beseley
- Succeeded by: William Watson; Richard Goldthorpe
- In office 1558–1558
- Preceded by: Robert Paycock
- Succeeded by: William Watson; Ralph Hall (MP)

Personal details
- Born: c. 1501
- Died: 1558 York
- Resting place: St Denys's Church, York
- Spouse: Margaret

William Holme was one of two Members of the Parliament of England for the constituency of York serving in five parliaments between 1547 and 1558.

== Life and politics ==
William was born in 1501 to Reginald and Margery Holme in York. He married Margaret and they had six sons and seven daughters. William became a freeman of the city of York in 1521 by virtue of his father. He achieved the privilege in his own right through his career as a wax chandler in 1529. He was a master of the guild of St Christopher and St George in 1533. He also held several offices in the city, notably that of junior chamberlain (1529–30), alderman (1540), tax collector (1550) and Lord Mayor (1546–47).

He became a notable citizen and gained the reputation of being a forcible negotiator on behalf of the city. During his time in Parliament he was very active. He secured and Act that allowed for the union of some parishes in the city reducing their number by a third. He also got the city's tax quota reduced in 1555.

He died on 8 September 1558 and was buried in St Denys's Church in York.

Political offices
Preceded by John North; Robert Hall	Member of Parliament; 1547–1553	Next: William Watson
Preceded by Thomas Gargrave	Member of Parliament; 1553–1554	Next: John North; Robert Hall
Preceded by John Beane; Richard White	Member of Parliament; 1554–1555	Next: Reginald Beseley
Preceded by Reginald Beseley	Member of Parliament; 1555–1558	Next: William Watson; Richard Goldthorpe
Preceded by Robert Paycock	Member of Parliament; 1558-1558	Next: William Watson; Ralph Hall
