= Hugh Graves =

MP for the constituency of York in 1571

Member of the England Parliament for York
- In office 1571–1572
- Preceded by: William Watson; Ralph Hall
- Succeeded by: Gregory Paycock/Robert Askwith
- In office 1572–1584
- Preceded by: Gregory Paycock/Robert Askwith
- Succeeded by: William Robinson; Robert Brooke

Hugh Graves was one of two Members of the Parliament of England for the constituency of York in 1571 and 1572.

== Life and politics ==
Hugh was born the third son of Robert and Effame Graves of Cleckheaton in 1516. He married twice. Firstly to Helen, who died in 1561 and secondly to a widow, Elizabeth Robinson. Hugh was part of the Yorkshire branch of the notable Gloucestershire Graves amongst whose ancestors was Admiral Lord Graves.

He was made a freeman of the city of York in 1540 and held the offices of chamberlain (1554–55), sheriff (1559–60) and Lord Mayor (1578–79). A weaver, by trade, he was able to acquire leases on several properties in St Saviourgate, Markgate and Castlegate. He was chosen to be MP for the city twice.

He died on 20 November 1589 and is buried in All Saints' Church, Pavement, York.

Political offices
Preceded by William Watson; Ralph Hall	Member of Parliament; 1571–1572	Next: Gregory Paycock/Robert Askwith
Preceded by Gregory Paycock/Robert Askwith	Member of Parliament; 1572–1584	Next: William Robinson; Robert Brooke
