= William Nelson (MP) =

English Member of Parliament

Member of the England Parliament for York
- In office 1504–1510
- Preceded by: Thomas Scotton
- Succeeded by: Brain Palmes
- In office 1510–1512
- Preceded by: Brian Palmes
- Succeeded by: Thomas Drawswerd
- In office 1512–1515
- Preceded by: Thomas Drawswerd
- Succeeded by: William Wright
- In office 1515–1523
- Preceded by: William Wright
- Succeeded by: John Norman; Thomas Burton

Personal details
- Spouse: Joan Norton
- Children: 3 sons & 3 daughters

William Nelson (circa 1462–1525) was one of two Members of the Parliament of England for the constituency of York on four consecutive terms between 1504 and 1523.

== Life and politics ==
William was born about 1462 as the second son of Thomas Nelson, a former lord mayor of York. He followed his father into being a merchant and became a freeman of the city in 1488. He traded in lead from Richmondshire and it alleged he was also a money lender. After his father's death, he inherited his properties in Poppleton, Riccall and Sherburn. He added lands near Acaster Malbis in 1503. His property dealings brought him into dispute with Sir John Gillot, who was mayor at the time, in 1503 to the extent he was fined for his threatening behaviour. He held the civic offices of senior chamberlain (1489–90, sheriff (1495–96), alderman (1499–1517) and mayor (1500–01).

Though he actually lost the election to parliament in 1515, he was requested by Henry VIII to stand in place of those that had been chosen. His terms in parliament were interrupted by several disturbances and riots in the city which caused him to be sent back.

He married Joan Norton and they had at least three sons and 3 daughters. He died in 1525.

Political offices
Preceded by Thomas Scotton	Member of Parliament; 1504–1510	Next: Brian Palmes
Preceded by Brian Palmes	Member of Parliament; 1510–1512	Next: Thomas Darwswerd
Preceded by Thomas Darwswerd	Member of Parliament; 1512–1515	Next: William Wright
Preceded by William Wright	Member of Parliament; 1515–1523	Next: John Norman; Thomas Burton
