= William Watson (16th century MP) =

English Member of Parliament

Member of the England Parliament for York
- In office 1553–1553
- Preceded by: Thomas Gargrave; William Holme
- Succeeded by: John North; Robert Hall
- In office 1558–1559
- Preceded by: William Holme; Robert Paycock
- Succeeded by: Ralph Hall
- In office 1562–1571
- Preceded by: Ralph Hall; Hugh Graves
- Succeeded by: Gregory Paycock/Robert Askwith; Hugh Graves

Personal details
- Born: 1513
- Died: 1568 (aged 54–55) York

William Watson was one of two Members of the Parliament of England for the constituency of York in 1553, between 1562 and 1571 and then again in another session in 1571.

== Life and politics ==
William was born in 1513. He was the brother-in-law of Gregory Paycock, who also represented the city as MP.

William held leases at a number of properties in the city, notably the Old Bailey near the Skeldergate Postern. Like many aldermen, he took a lease on Ouse Bridge as recorded in the Bridgemasters' Rolls, but did not live there, preferring a residence in High Ousegate. Although a notable tenant of his Ousebridge house was Andrew Trewe who was also represented the city as MP. He had other properties in Blossomgate, Coppergate, Water Lane and North Street. The latter he bequeathed to his nephew, Robert Paycock. As a franchised merchant, he became involved in the running of the city and held several offices. He held the office of chamberlain in 1536, sheriff in 1541 and elected as an alderman in 1542 and 1543. He was chosen as MP on three occasions in 1553, 1559 and 1563. In some tax records, he is noted as being a mounted archer.

During his time as MP, he was appointed as a commissioner of inquiry charged with enforcing the Act of Uniformity 1558 and the Act of Supremacy 1558 in the city of York.

Political offices
Preceded by Thomas Gargrave; William Holme	Member of Parliament; 1553	Next: John North; Robert Hall]]
Preceded by William Holme; Robert Paycock	Member of Parliament; 1558–1559	Next: Hugh Graves]]
Preceded by Hugh Graves	Member of Parliament; 1562–1571	Next: Gregory Paycock/Robert Askwith; Hugh Graves
