= John Beane =

16th-century English politician

John Beane (c. 1503 (Note: Date of birth estimated from admission as freeman)–1580) was an English politician from York.

Beane was a member (MP) of the parliament of England for York in April 1554.
