= Thomas Gargrave =

English politician (1495–1579)

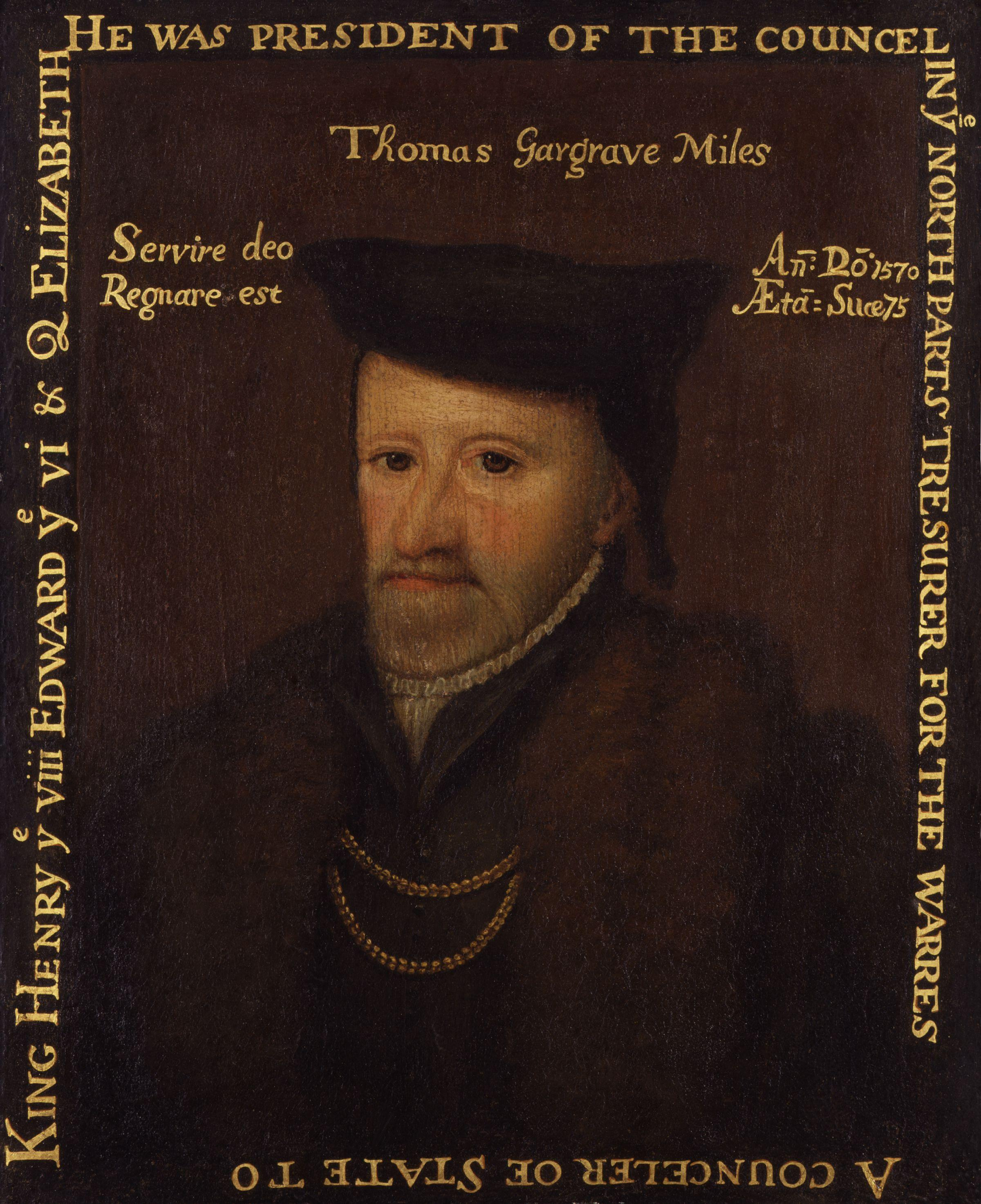
Sir Thomas Gargrave, oil on panel, unknown artist, 1570. Gift to National Portrait Gallery, London, by Gery Milner-Gibson-Cullum

Sir Thomas Gargrave (1495–1579) was an English Knight who served as High Sheriff of Yorkshire in 1565 and 1569. His principal residence was at Nostell Priory, one of many grants of land that Gargrave secured during his lifetime. He was Speaker of the House of Commons and vice president of the Council of the North.

== Early life ==
Gargrave was the son of Thomas Gargrave of Wakefield, West Yorkshire, and Elizabeth, daughter of William Levett of Hooton Levitt and Normanton, West Yorkshire. Through his mother's Levett family, Gargrave was related to such Yorkshire clans as the Wickersleys and their descendants, the Swyfts (Swifts), the Reresbys, the Barnbys, the Wentworths, the Bosviles, the Mirfins and others.

He received a legal education at either Gray's Inn or the Middle Temple, and by 1521 began his career as Steward of the Household of Thomas Darcy, 1st Baron Darcy de Darcy (often called Lord Darcy of the North), where Gargrave's ambition and drive were immediately apparent.

== Political career ==
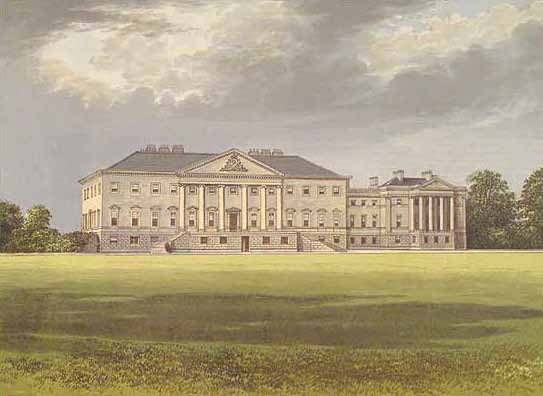
Nostell Priory

Gargrave served in Scotland in 1547 as treasurer to the English army during the war known as the Rough Wooing under Earl of Warwick. The Earl of Shrewsbury subsequently helped him gain a place on the Council of the North which required that he be knighted.

With the help of Darcy's influence, Gargrave rose quickly, after being knighted in 1549 and becoming Knight of the Shire for Yorkshire in 1553, 1554 and 1555 and again in 1563, 1571 and 1572, he was made Deputy Constable for Pontefract Castle, Steward of York Minster, Receiver of the Exchequer for Yorkshire, Master in Chancery, and Recorder for Kingston upon Hull. Gargrave's rise was meteoric, from humble steward to Knight of the Realm and one of the most powerful men in England, serving frequently on Yorkshire business and at Court.

Gargrave was elected speaker in Queen Elizabeth's first parliament in 1559 and widely known for his address to Parliament of 25 January 1559 in which he urged Queen Elizabeth I to take a husband and marry.

He was appointed High Sheriff of Yorkshire for 1565 and 1569. In 1567 he acquired Nostell Priory from James Blunt, Lord Mountjoy, for £3560.

In August 1568, Gargrave was named supervisor of the estate of William Swyfte of Rotherham, brother of Robert Swyfte, Esq., of Broom Hall, Sheffield.

=== Northern Rebellion ===
During the Northern Rebellion from November to December 1569 he was keeper of Pontefract Castle and guarded bridges over the River Aire with 100 soldiers. With Henry Gates, Humphrey Barwick, and Marmaduke Constable, he took Hartlepool from the rebel leader Christopher Neville.

During the aftermath of the rebellion, Gargave and George Bowes asked that pardons should be issued as many villages were befeft of inhabitants. Gargrave was a witness to the execution of Thomas Percy, 7th Earl of Northumberland at York.

== Private life ==
Sir Thomas Gargrave married Anne, daughter of William Cotton and Margaret (Culpeper) of Oxon Hoath, Kent, by whom he had his only child, Sir Cotton Gargrave, also High Sheriff of Yorkshire. He married secondly Jane, widow of Sir John Wentworth of North Elmsall, West Yorkshire.

== Legacy ==
In Old Halls, Manors and Families of Derbyshire, author Joseph Tilley sums up the Gargrave legacy as follows: "The Gargraves were a knightly house, who came in for extensive grants of Abbey lands in Yorkshire, but who, within a century afterwards, sank into obscurity. The grandfather of the purchaser of One Ash was Speaker of Queen Elizabeth's first Parliament and President of the Council of the North. He was a favourite of Her Majesty and her minister Burghley; he had a grant from Bess, of the Old Park, Wakefield, but he adopted the glorious old Priory of Nostell for a residence. This was the gentleman who conducted poor Mary of Scots from Bolton to Tutbury."

The story of the Gargraves became an oft-cited tale of the rise – and fall – of ambition. Of the Gargraves, it is said, the poet Byron was moved to write: "'Twere long to tell, and sad to trace, Each step from splendour to disgrace."

The bulk of the Gargrave properties passed to Thomas Gargrave, eldest son of Sir Cotton Gargrave, who left them to his only daughter, who broke with the family's Royalist sympathies by marrying Dr. Richard Berry, physician to Oliver Cromwell. "Berry," according to one early history, "contrived to make himself master of their fortune, and the whole family sunk into obscurity."

No less an authority than Sir Bernard Burke, in his Vicissitudes of Families, was moved by the Gargraves' precipitous fall. "The story of the Gargraves is a melancholy chapter in real life," wrote Burke in the nineteenth century. "For full two centuries or more, scarcely a family in Yorkshire enjoyed a higher position." Subsequently, Sir Thomas Gargrave's oldest son was hanged at York for murder; his half-brother Sir Richard Gargrave of Nostell Priory, once High Sheriff of Yorkshire, later wasted his estate, and was reduced to gambling for a cup of ale, plunging his family into penury. Sir Richard was eventually found dead in a London flophouse. "Not many years since," Burke wrote, "a Mr. Gargrave, believed to be one of them, filled the mean employment of parish clerk at Kippax."

Sir Thomas Gargrave is interred in the south choir of St Michael and Our Lady Church, within the grounds of Nostell Priory. A monument on his tomb states: "Here lyeth Sir Thomas Gargrave, knight, who dyed the 28 of March, 1579, who served sundry times in the wars and as counsellor at Yorke xxxv yeare. He maryed Anne Cotton of Kent and Jane Appleton, widow of Sir John Wentworth of Elmesall. He had yssue only by Anne Cotton, tow sonnes, Cotton and John, which John dyed att his byrth." On Gargrave's tomb are incised the family's coat-of-arms: "On the plate, lozengy ar. and sa. on a bend sa. 3 crescents of the first."

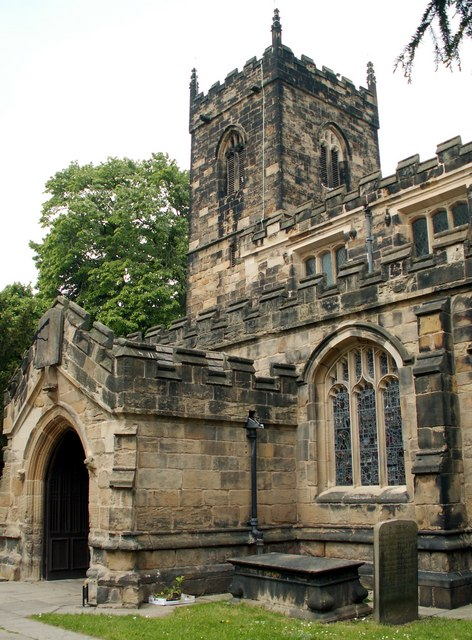
Church of St Michael and Our Lady, Wragby, Wakefield; Sir Thomas Gargrave is buried within the choir

Political offices
| Preceded by Sir William Cordell | Speaker of the House of Commons; 1559 | Succeeded by Thomas Williams |
Political offices
| Preceded by Sir Richard Lyster | Custos Rotulorum of the West Riding of Yorkshire bef. 1558–1579 | Succeeded by Francis Wortley |
