= Corpus Christi Guild in York =

The Corpus Christi Guild of York was a major medieval religious guild founded in 1408 to celebrate the Feast of Corpus Christi, and by its dissolution in 1546 had nearly 17,000 members including the archbishops of York and leading figures of the city elite. Almost uniquely among English religious guilds it was led by clergy.
