= Ralph Hall (MP) =

York MP

Member of the England Parliament for York
- In office 1562–1571
- Preceded by: William Watson; Richard Goldthorpe
- Succeeded by: Gregory Paycock/Robert Askwith
- In office 1571–1571
- Preceded by: Gregory Paycock/Robert Askwith
- Succeeded by: William Robinson; Robert Brooke

Personal details
- Died: 1577 York
- Spouse: Isabel Gale

Ralph Hall was one of two Members of the Parliament of England for the constituency of York between 1562 and 1571 and then again in another session in 1571.

== Life and politics ==
Ralph was the second son of William Hall and Elizabeth Dyneley. He married Isabel Gale, son of Alderman George Gale, who was also an MP for the city of York.

He was made a freeman of the city in 1532 and became a member of the guild of Merchant Adventureres in 1532. He held several offices for the city, including chamberlain (1538–39), sheriff (1553–54), alderman (1556 and two terms as Lord Mayor (1558–59 and 1576–77). Not much has been recorded of his life. Ralph died in 1577.

Political offices
Preceded by William Watson; Richard Goldthorpe	Member of Parliament; 1562–1571	Next: Gregory Paycock/Robert Askwith
Preceded by Gregory Paycock/Robert Askwith	Member of Parliament; 1571-1571	Next: William Robinson (1534-1616); Robert Brooke (16th century MP)
