= William Robinson (1522–1616) =

English Member of Parliament

Member of the England Parliament for York
- In office 1584–1586
- Preceded by: Robert Askwith; Hugh Graves
- Succeeded by: William Hillard; Robert Brooke
- In office 1588–1593
- Preceded by: William Hillard; Robert Brooke
- Succeeded by: Andrew Trewe; James Birkby

Personal details
- Born: 1522
- Died: 1616 (aged 93–94) York
- Resting place: All Saints' Church, Pavement, York
- Spouse(s): Isabel Redman (1st); Frances Harrison(2nd)
- Children: Thomas; William; Frances; Jane

William Robinson was one of two Members of the Parliament of England for the constituency of York between 1584 and 1586 and then again between 1588 and 1593.

== Life and politics ==
William was born in 1522. He married Isabel Redman, sister of John Redman from Fullforth, in the County of Yorke, daughter of Richard Redman, of Gressingham, co. Lanc. They had two sons, Thomas and William, and two daughters, Frances and Jane. Frances married the York Alderman, Robert Harrison. Jane was married twice. Firstly to Richard Herbert, a York merchant and secondly to Robert Corney, a medical doctor. His son Thomas died unmarried in 1625. His other son William married Margaret, sister of Sir Henry Jenkins from Grimstone, Yorkshire, and daughter of John Jenkins of Yorke, in 1599 at Catton Derbyshire.

Isabel, his wife, died in 1590 and buried at St. Crux, York. He married his second wife Frances, daughter of Thomas Harrison, a York merchant.

William was made a freeman of the city c. 1558. He also held several offices in the city. Notably those of chamberlain (1563–64); sheriff (1568–69 and 1607–08); alderman and Lord mayor (1581–82 and 1594–95). As an Alderman, he represented the Parish of St Crux. He was a wealthy merchant whose trade was mainly in the region of Denmark and Sweden, known as the Sound. He had resided in Hamburg for several years in his career as a merchant before settling in York. He was chosen to be MP for the city on two occasions. Firstly in 1584 and then again in 1588. According to records he had several disagreements with various merchants in the city.

William died in 1616 and was buried in St Crux church in York. His will bears witness to his wealth. In it there is mention of various properties in the city that included the inn "Sign of the Panyers" in Walmgate as well as houses in St Saviourgate and Hungate. He also owned orchards in Aldwark and Hungate as well as land on Bootham Common. In his will he also gave eighty pounds and a silver bowl to the city, as well as forty pounds to the Merchants Company.

Political offices
Preceded by Robert Askwith; Hugh Graves	Member of Parliament; 1584–1586	Next: William Hillard; Robert Brooke
Preceded by William Hillard; Robert Brooke	Member of Parliament; 1588–1593	Next: Andrew Trewe; James Birkby
