= William Hilliard (English MP) =

MP for the constituency of York in 1586-1588

Member of the England Parliament for York
- In office 1586–1588
- Preceded by: William Robinson; Robert Brooke
- Succeeded by: Robert Askwith; William Robinson

Personal details
- Died: 1608 York
- Resting place: St Michael le Belfrey, York
- Spouse: Ann Howe
- Relations: Christopher Hilliard (nephew); Henry Hildyard (MP) (great-nephew); Sir Robert Hildyard, 1st Baronet (great-nephew)
- Children: 3
- Parent(s): Martyn Hildyard; Emma Rudston
- Education: St John's College, Cambridge
- Profession: Lawyer

William Hilliard or Hildyard (died 1608) was one of two Members of the Parliament of England for the constituency of York between 1586 and 1588.

== Life and politics ==
William was the fourth son of Martin Hilliard (Hildyard) of Winestead in the East Riding of Yorkshire. He was educated at St John's College, Cambridge. He became a member of Inner Temple in 1560 and was called to the bar in 1571. He married Ann Howe with whom he had three sons, William (1577–1632), Christopher (born 1579) and Henry (born 1585). His son William would be knighted and own lands in Bishop Wilton.

He became a freeman of the city of York in 1581 and was chosen to be the Recorder for the city on 8 January 1582 following the death of William Bernard. William was a Justice of the Peace for the East Riding of Yorkshire on three separate occasions. Due to his successful career, he acquired a large amount of land around the Beverley area. He was chosen to be MP for the city of York in 1586.

He died in 1608 and was buried at St Michael le Belfrey, York.

Political offices
Preceded by William Robinson; Robert Brooke	Member of Parliament; 1586–1588	Next: Robert Askwith; William Robinson
