= Arthur Ingram =

English politician (c. 1565 – 1642)

Sir Arthur Ingram
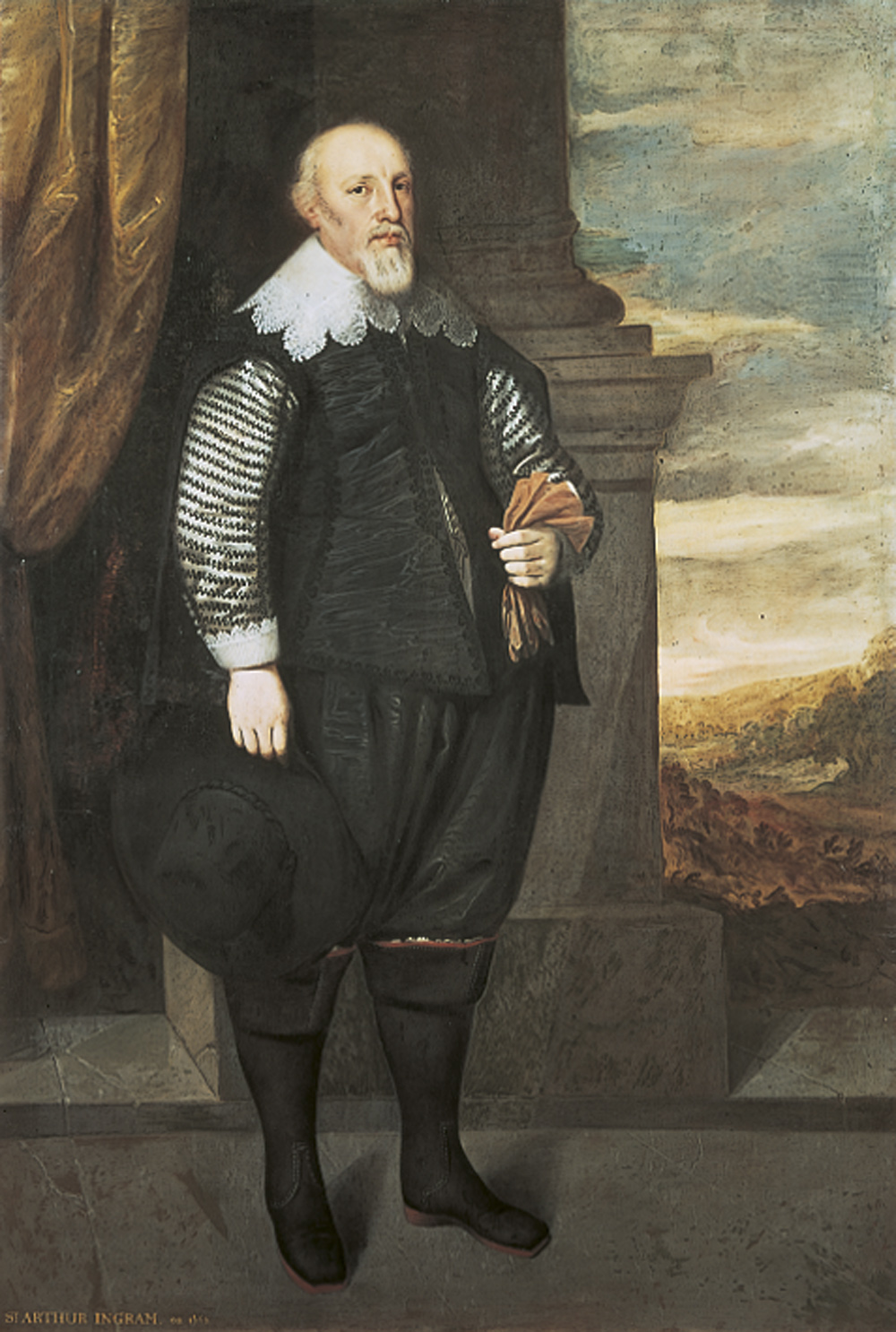
- Sir Arthur Ingram by George Geldorp
- Born: c. 1565; York
- Died: 24 August 1642; York
- Spouses: Susan Brown (died 1613); Alice Halliday (1613-1614); Mary Greville (1615-1642)
- Children: 6 sons, 1 daughter
- Parents: Hugh Ingram (father); Anne Goldthorpe (mother)

Member of Parliament for York
- In office 1624–1629

Sir Arthur Ingram (c. 1565 – 1642) was an English investor, landowner and politician who sat in the House of Commons at various times between 1610 and 1642. The subject of an influential biography, he has been celebrated for his "financial skill and ruthless self-interest", and characterized as "a rapacious, plausible swindler who ruined many during a long and successful criminal career". Probably of London birth but of Yorkshire background, he was a very extensive landowner in Yorkshire. He acquired and rebuilt the former Lennox residence at Temple Newsam near Leeds, which became the principal seat of his family, including the Lords Ingram, Viscount Irvine and their descendants, for over 300 years.

== Origins and early life ==
The date of Sir Arthur Ingram's birth is not known. He was the second of three sons of Hugh Ingram (died 1614), a prosperous merchant and citizen Tallow Chandler of London who originated from Thorpe-on-the-Hill in Yorkshire. Hugh imported goods from the Continent for sale as well as being a money lender and debt collector.

The eldest son, Sir William Ingram (died 1623), was Doctor of Civil Law (of Trinity College, Cambridge, and the Inner Temple), and became Secretary to the Council in the North. Their mother was Anne, daughter of Richard Goldthorpe, haberdasher, Lord Mayor of York 1556-57 and M.P. for the City of York in 1559.

Little is known of Arthur Ingram's early years. A merchant in London, there are indications that he had been a factor in Italy, and was at some time in Turkey. In the early 1600s he developed an association with Lionel Cranfield. Having been a Waiter (customs officer) in the Port of London, in 1603 he was appointed Comptroller of Customs (until 1613), a role in which he made himself useful to the Earl of Suffolk and Earl of Nottingham. In 1605, (until 1614) he took over the management of the wine licence patent for Lord Admiral Nottingham, who remarked in 1610 that "the whole and many pains and scandals of the business did ever since the beginning thereof lie upon Mr. Arthur Ingram only, with an incessant trouble to him and his house."

The Howards became somewhat dependent upon his services and assistance, and he benefited from their patronage by advancement where opportunity arose.

From 1607 until 1615, Ingram was, with Sir Walter Cope (associate of the Earl of Salisbury), contractor for the sale of Crown lands, through which office he acquired several excellent estates.

Historian Thomas Birch (1705–1766) wrote that, in buying land, Ingram's practice "was to pay the one half down fairly and fully, but the second half by a Chancery bill, that is, he would find some flaw, some incumbrance or other, to baulk the second payment, and so call the seller into and hold him in the Chancery." At one time he had no fewer than 21 lawsuits in progress.

These methods won him control of large purchases, but cost him friends. On the other hand, it has been argued that the King, knowing him to be a pragmatic man, and one discreet in speech and demeanour, advanced him at a time when many people were enriching themselves and had money to spend on great projects, and knew that he would be useful in finding ways to accumulate revenue for the crown: and that by doing so, he was disliked and described as a "mean fellow" by those whom he had successfully mulcted to the crown's advantage.

== The Alum Company ==
Serving as collector for dyewood and starch duties in 1607–08, Ingram investigated revenues from the English alum refinery (for use in cloth dyeing processes) then being established in Yorkshire. In 1607 Sir Thomas Chaloner, Sir David Foulis, Sir John Bourchier and Lord Sheffield in partnership obtained a 31-year monopoly based upon the Chaloner estates at Guisborough and Redcar. The concession was leased to London merchants who made substantial losses, despite the use of expert workmen from Germany. As their investments failed, on Ingram's advice the Lord Treasurer Salisbury bought out the patent in 1609, and upon Ingram's favourable report a new lease was issued, the dues of which however soon became onerous to the farmers of the industry.

In November 1609 Ingram entered parliament as representative for Stafford, presumably under Salisbury's patronage in connection with the Great Contract. He served on several committees for bills touching his own knowledge and interest, and that of his patrons, who by their continuing support taught him the advantage of a parliamentary career. As he became over-engaged in land transactions doubts over his liquidity emerged, but confidence in his credit-worthiness was restored by means of a declaration signed by the Earl of Salisbury, the Earl of Northampton and the Lord Chancellor. At this time he was operating from premises in Fenchurch Street.

By 1612 the Alum Company was failing, and went into insolvency shortly before the death of Lord Treasurer Salisbury. Following various proposals Ingram, with Walter Cope and Robert Johnson, persuaded the Lords Commissioners to grant them control as contractors under a new adjustment, and in 1613, as the works passed into the King's hands, they became managers for the Crown, and claimed to have invested large sums of their own money. In March 1613 Ingram obtained by purchase the position of Secretary and Keeper of the Signet of the Council in the North, a position he held until 1633, his elder brother Dr William Ingram serving as his Deputy until his death in 1623. This post was acquired for £5,200 from Sir Robert Carey, governor to Prince Charles. For his residence he entirely remodelled two large houses including the ruined former Archbishop's palace in York between 1616 and 1623. He received the honour of knighthood on 9 July 1613, and his brother in 1617.

== Three marriages ==
Ingram's first marriage was to Susan, daughter of Richard Brown of London. There were four sons including his heir, the younger Arthur Ingram (knighted 1621), and a daughter.

Following the death of his wife Susan in July 1613, Ingram remarried soon afterwards to a London city widow, Alice Halliday. "She had withstoode an army of wooers, and I thincke is now lighted on the worst", wrote John Chamberlain. Alice, daughter of the London citizen Mercer William Ferrars, was formerly married to John Halliday, son and heir of Sir Leonard Halliday (Lord Mayor of London 1605–06), and was worth £3000. On 9 March 1614 he took a seat in parliament for New Romney. There was one child of his second marriage, Thomas Ingram, who became Chancellor of the Duchy of Lancaster: Alice died in October 1614 of a quinsy, not long after his birth.

In February 1614/5 Ingram purchased a place at court and entered office as Cofferer of the King's Household. This however was so strongly resisted by those over whom he thus gained authority that, despite having moved his furnishings and plate into his chambers, he was obliged to give it up soon afterwards. In the same year he took to his third wife Mary Greville, daughter of Sir Edward Greville of Milcote, Warwickshire. In addition to bringing Ingram a Warwickshire estate and the advantage of Mary's family connections, this proved a sincere and lasting union and there was one further child, Lionel Ingram. Dame Mary lived until 1661. In the wake of his humiliation at court, Ingram (when not occupied with legal activities in London and the business of parliament) increasingly transferred his operations to Yorkshire. His mother Anne Ingram died in London in 1616 making charitable bequests and making her principal beneficiary and executors her daughter Anne and son-in-law James Trott.

== Alum ==
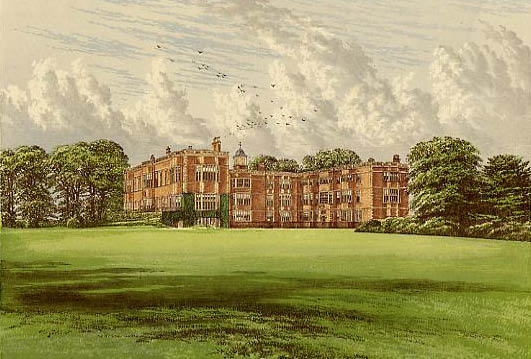
Temple Newsam House from Morris's Country Seats (1880)

In 1615 Ingram received the grant of Sheriff Hutton Park, in the Forest of Galtres, and over the next years built the New Lodge there as his country residence. Ingram, Johnson, Martin Freman and George Lowe in partnership became the new farmers of the alum works upon more favourable terms. The ill reputation which had seen him driven from court still pursued him, however, and a commission was set up to report into claims of fraudulent dealings. Lowe complained he had been drawn into the partnership unscrupulously, and in 1618 a scandal broke as it was proved that the Lord Treasurer, the Earl of Suffolk, who was on trial in the Court of Star Chamber for various offences, had engaged in corrupt transactions with Ingram. Ingram however escaped severe punishment and continued his close involvement, gaining sole lease in 1621. Though his management probably brought him little profit or popularity with his employees, he doubled the productivity of the works and built up an export trade, setting the direction for the continuation of the industry.

In Yorkshire Ingram found for patron and associate Thomas Wentworth, Custos rotulorum for Yorkshire. Ingram was High Sheriff of Yorkshire in 1619–20, and was returned M.P. for Appleby, Westmorland for the parliament of 1620–1. Letters from late 1620 show him in Wentworth's interest for re-election as Knight of the Shire, and the hospitality of his house requisitioned for that purpose. In the following year his son and heir Arthur was knighted, and in 1622 Ingram made his purchase (for £12,000) of the neglected mansion of Temple Newsam, near Leeds, from Ludovic Stewart, 2nd Duke of Lennox, with its prestigious royal associations as the birthplace of the King's father, and commenced a 12-year rebuilding project there. His brother Sir William died at York in 1623.

The York Corporation, with expressions of appreciation for his goodwill towards them, enlisted his help in resolving differences with Hull over lead and corn, which were brought to a successful conclusion in 1623 through the offices of Lionel Cranfield, now Earl of Middlesex and Lord High Treasurer. Ingram was rewarded with the freedom of York, exempt from duty in municipal office. Wentworth, meanwhile, had been forced to give up his London position as Receiver of crown lands and return to Yorkshire. In February 1624 Ingram became MP for York. Having failed to support his friend Cranfield's opposition to a Spanish War, instead advocating practical measures dependent upon the royal intention, he was then drawn into, and contributed significantly towards, proceedings for Cranfield's impeachment over land transactions from which he himself had benefited at Cranfield's expense.

Wheels were already in motion to unclamp his hold on the alum monopoly. Sir John Bourchier, who in 1622 was released from all crown debts relating to it since 1611, made a formal proposal to amalgamate the alum and soap businesses, with compensation to Ingram, but then neutralized Ingram's interest by bringing charges against him for misappropriation of funds and breach of contract. Ingram was arrested and taken to London in October 1624. Such was the evidence presented to the resulting Exchequer Commission that Ingram was obliged to surrender the business in February 1625. However, through his favour with the King, and the larger processes surrounding the Statute of Monopolies of May 1624, he escaped from the affair very lightly.

Following the King's death in March 1625 and the accession of King Charles, he was returned as MP for the city in the next three parliaments, in 1625, 1625–6, and 1627–8.

== Ingram's almshouses ==
Ingram built the almshouse known as Ingram's Hospital which still stands in Bootham, York. He bought land for the purpose from Thomas Sandwith in 1629/30 and the building was completed in 1632. The almshouse provided for ten poor widows. Built of dark red brick with stone facings and a tiled roof, it is dominated by a low central tower over a former tower and caretaker's rooms. The decorative central doorway, of c1190, was bought from Holy Trinity Priory, Micklegate – its provenance is recorded in the Ingram accounts at Temple Newsam, though there has been an alternative theory that it came from St Giles church, formerly in Gillygate.

Birch relates that Ingram took one Mr Garbut of Leeds to see the almshouses to get his opinion of them:

'...which though he was loath to give, yet being urged, he told him, it was too little. "Why", said Sir A., "the rooms are big enough, and it's in every man's choice what number he will admit." "However," said Mr G., "it is too little to hold those that you have undone." '

It is thought that Ingram died at York in 1642 as the Civil War was breaking out. In January 1642, fearing for the safety of his family and retinue, King Charles left the London area for the north of the country, and was a guest of Sir Arthur Ingram in his York House for some part of this period. He died on 24 August 1642. Ingram made his will on 15 August 1640 and it was proved on 10 September 1642.

== Family ==
Ingram married three times. His children include:

- Arthur Ingram, who married Eleanor, a daughter of Sir Henry Slingsby.
- Thomas Ingram (1614–1672), his son by his second marriage, who married Frances, a daughter of Lord Fauconberg, and is commemorated by a memorial in Westminster Abbey.
- John Ingram (died 1634), who married Anne Calverley, a daughter of Lady Isabella Hopton.
- Elizabeth Ingram, who married (1) Simon Bennet, (2) Robert Rich, future Earl of Holland, and was the mother of a son and heir, Henry Rich, Lord Kensington, born in 1642, who died young.

Ingram's successors continued to live at Temple Newsam until 1922.

Parliament of England
Preceded by Hugh Beeston; George Cradock	Member of Parliament for Stafford; 1609–1611; With: George Cradock	Succeeded by Sir Walter Devereux; Thomas Gibbs
Preceded by Sir Robert Remington; John Plommer	Member of Parliament for New Romney; 1614; With: Robert Wilcock	Succeeded by Sir Peter Manwood; Francis Fetherston
Preceded by Sir George Savile, junior Sir Henry Wotton	Member of Parliament for Appleby; 1621–1624; With: Thomas Hughes	Succeeded by Thomas Hughes
Preceded by Sir Robert Askwith; Christopher Brooke	Member of Parliament for York; 1624–1629; With: Christopher Brooke 1624–1628; Sir Thomas Savile 1628; Thomas Hoyle 1628–1629	Parliament suspended until 1640
Vacant Parliament suspended since 1629	Member of Parliament for Windsor; 1640; With: Sir Richard Harrison	Succeeded by Cornelius Holland; Richard Winwood
Preceded by Samuel Rolle; Thomas Gardiner	Member of Parliament for Callington; 1640–1642; With: Hon. George Fane	Succeeded by Lord Clinton; Thomas Dacres
