= Andrew Trewe =

Member of the Parliament of England

Member of the England Parliament for York
- In office 1593–1601
- Preceded by: Robert Askwith; William Robinson
- Succeeded by: James Birkby; Thomas Moseley (MP)

Personal details
- Born: York
- Died: York
- Resting place: All Saints' Church, Pavement, York
- Spouse: Jane Edwyne
- Children: William + two daughters
- Parent(s): Richard Trewe; Jennet Trewe

Andrew Trewe was one of two Members of the Parliament of England for the constituency of York between 1593 and 1601.

== Life and politics ==
Andrew was the son of Richard and Jennet Trewe. His father was a cordwainer. In 1556 he married Jane Edwyne, in St Martins, Micklegate, and they had one son, William, and 2 daughters. He was churchwarden of St Martins in 1558. Prior to becoming MP for York, he was made a freeman of the city in 1556. He also held the offices of a chamberlain (1566–1567); sheriff (1568–1569); alderman (1581); Lord Mayor (1585–1586) and High Commissioner for York in 1599.

He made a living as a merchant trading in the waterways between Denmark and Sweden and into the Baltic Sea. This enabled him to lease various properties in the city, including the Castle Mills. His wealth was described as modest. He lived in a tenement on Ouse Bridge, and arranged to lease ground at the back, which became known as Fish Landing. After which he also held a lease in Haymonger Lane (now Church Lane off Low Ousegate).

Very little else is known of Andrew's life apart from a few references. As a noted merchant, he was charged by the city council to reclaim the copies of all theatrical plays pertaining to the city that were in the keeping of the Archbishop of York.

Political offices
Preceded by Robert Askwith; William Robinson	Member of Parliament; 1593 - 1601	Next: James Birkby; Thomas Moseley (MP)
