= Robert Paycock =

Member of the Parliament of England

Member of the England Parliament for York
- In office 1558–1558
- Preceded by: William Holme; Reginald Beseley
- Succeeded by: William Holme; Richard Goldthorpe

Personal details
- Born: 1513
- Died: 1570 (aged 56–57) York
- Resting place: All Saints' Church, Pavement, York
- Spouse(s): Anne Gale; Anne Babthorpe
- Children: James; Christopher; Richard; Robert; Dorothy; Agnes

Robert Paycock (also recorded as Peacock) was one of two Members of the Parliament of England for the constituency of York in 1558.

== Life and politics ==
Robert was twice married. First to Anne gale, daughter of George Gale and secondly to Anne Babthorpe. He fathered at least five sons and two daughters. Only the names of James, Chrisptopher, Richard, Robert, Agnes, and Dorothy are known.

He held several offices in the city of York including junior chamberlain (1537–38); sheriff (1540–41); alderman (1543 until his death) and Lord Mayor (1548–49 and again in 1567-68). He also was a very successful merchant holding the offices of constable and master of the merchants guild on two occasions each. Records show he held a licence to trade and export lead. Along with fellow MP, William Holme, he successfully petitioned for tax rebates for the city. Being one of the wealthiest men in the city he held several properties in Coppergate, the Pavement, Peaseholme and Water Lane.

In the records of the All Saints Parish (known then as All Hallows), he was noted as being a horsed archer and was part of the muster of 1539.

He died in 1570 and was buried in All Saints' Churchin the Pavement in York.

Political offices
Preceded by William Holme; Reginald Beseley	Member of Parliament; 1558	Next: William Holme; Richard Goldthorpe
