= John Layer =

English antiquarian

- Born: 1585 or 1586
- Died: 1641
- Occupation: Antiquarian

John Layer (1585?–1641) was an English antiquarian from Cambridge.

== Biography ==
Layer was born in 1585 or 1586, probably at Lillings Ambo in the North Riding of Yorkshire. He was the son of William Layer, a London merchant, by his wife Martha, daughter and heiress of Thomas Wanton. He was educated as a lawyer, but possessed sufficient wealth to enable him to devote most of his time to antiquarian pursuits. He resided at Shepreth in Cambridgeshire. His parochial history of Cambridgeshire is one of the earliest of the kind written. It was never published, but parts of it are still preserved in the British Museum among the Harleian MSS. (No. 6768), which contains a transcript of the portion relating to the hundreds of Armingford, Long Stowe, Papworth, North Stowe, Chesterton, Wetherley, Thriplowe, and among the Additional MSS. (Nos. 5819, 5823, 5849, 5954). Other portions of it are extant in the Bishop's Library at Ely, and at the library at Wimpole Hall, Cambridge. His extracts from the registers of the Bishop of Ely are in the British Museum (Addit. MSS. 5824–5828), and his Cambridge pedigrees are in the same library (Addit. MS. 5812). An autograph manuscript volume by Layer, licensed for printing and entitled 'The Reformed Justice, or an Alphabeticall Abstract of all such Articles and Matters as are incident and enquirable at the generall quarter Sessions of the Peace or otherwise belonginge to the knowledge and practice of a Justice of the Peace,' is in the library of Caius College, Cambridge. It is a handbook for justices of the peace, and is dedicated to Sir John Cutts, 'Custos rotulorum for the county of Cambridge' in 1633. In an epistle to the reader notice is taken of a book recently published, entitled 'The Compleat Justice,' of which Layer was the reputed author. This work is not extant, but a copy of a legal treatise by Layer entitled 'The Office and Duty of Churchwardens, Constables, and Overseers of the Poor' (Cambridge, 1641, 8vo), is preserved in the Bodleian Library. One of Layer's notebooks is among the Rawlinson MSS. in the Bodleian Library (B. 278), and another entitled 'Notes of the Foundation of several Religious Houses from the Collections of John Layer' is in Dodsworth MS. 90 (pp. 158–60).

Layer died in 1641. He married in 1611, Frances, daughter of Robert Sterne of Malton in Cambridgeshire. By her he had three sons and two daughters. He may be truly called the father of Cambridge archaeology, and William Cole (1714–1782) owed much to his industry. After his death, his manuscripts eventually fell into the hands of his descendant, John Eyre, who sold his estate at Shepreth and came to London. Eyre was afterwards convicted of felony and transported, when the manuscripts were dispersed. Several, however, fell into Cole's hands and were incorporated by him in his collections. An undated letter from W. Fairfax of Yorkshire to J. Layer is among the Bodleian MSS. (Rawlinson, B. 450, f. 390).
