= Sheriff Hutton Hall =

Building in Sheriff Hutton, North Yorkshire, England

Coordinates: 54.0819°N 0.9906°W

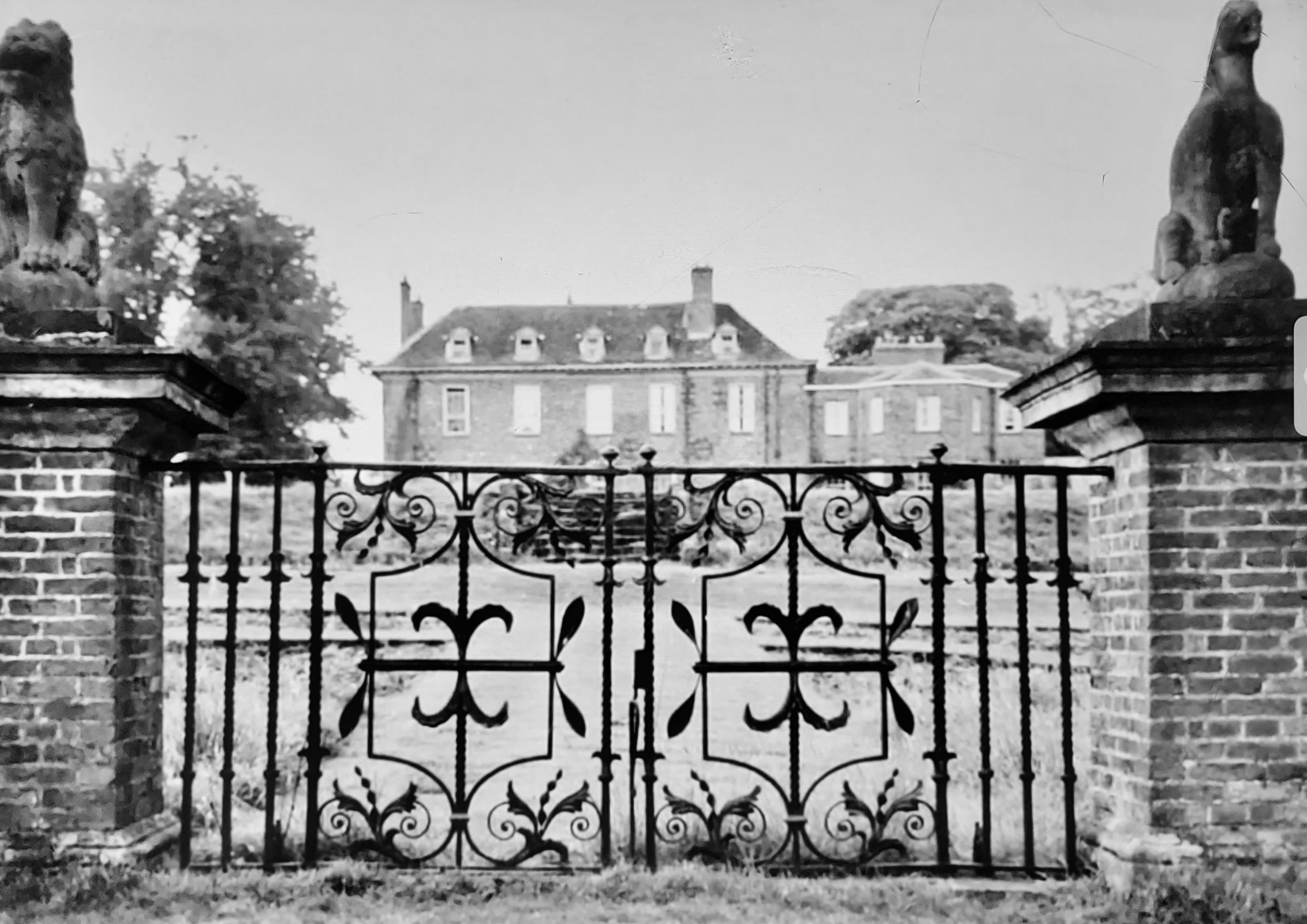
The building, at an unknown date

Sheriff Hutton Hall is a historic building in Sheriff Hutton, a village in North Yorkshire, in England.

== History ==
A deer park was enclosed at Sheriff Hutton in 1335, and a royal hunting lodge was later built in it. Between 1619 and 1624, Arthur Ingram demolished the old building and constructed a large new shooting lodge. The construction was carried out by Richard Maybank and Henry Duckett, who reused stone from Sheriff Hutton Castle. It included a great hall, long gallery and chapel. It originally had a U-shape, but in the 1730s it was remodelled and the wings were demolished. In 1848, a large extension was added to the right. The building was grade I listed in 1954. It became part of the East 15 Acting School in the 1980s, but by 2010 it was in poor repair. It was restored, the work including the rebuilding of a bulging first floor wall, and in 2020 it was marketed for sale for £10,000,000, along with its 203 acres (82 ha) estate.

== Architecture ==
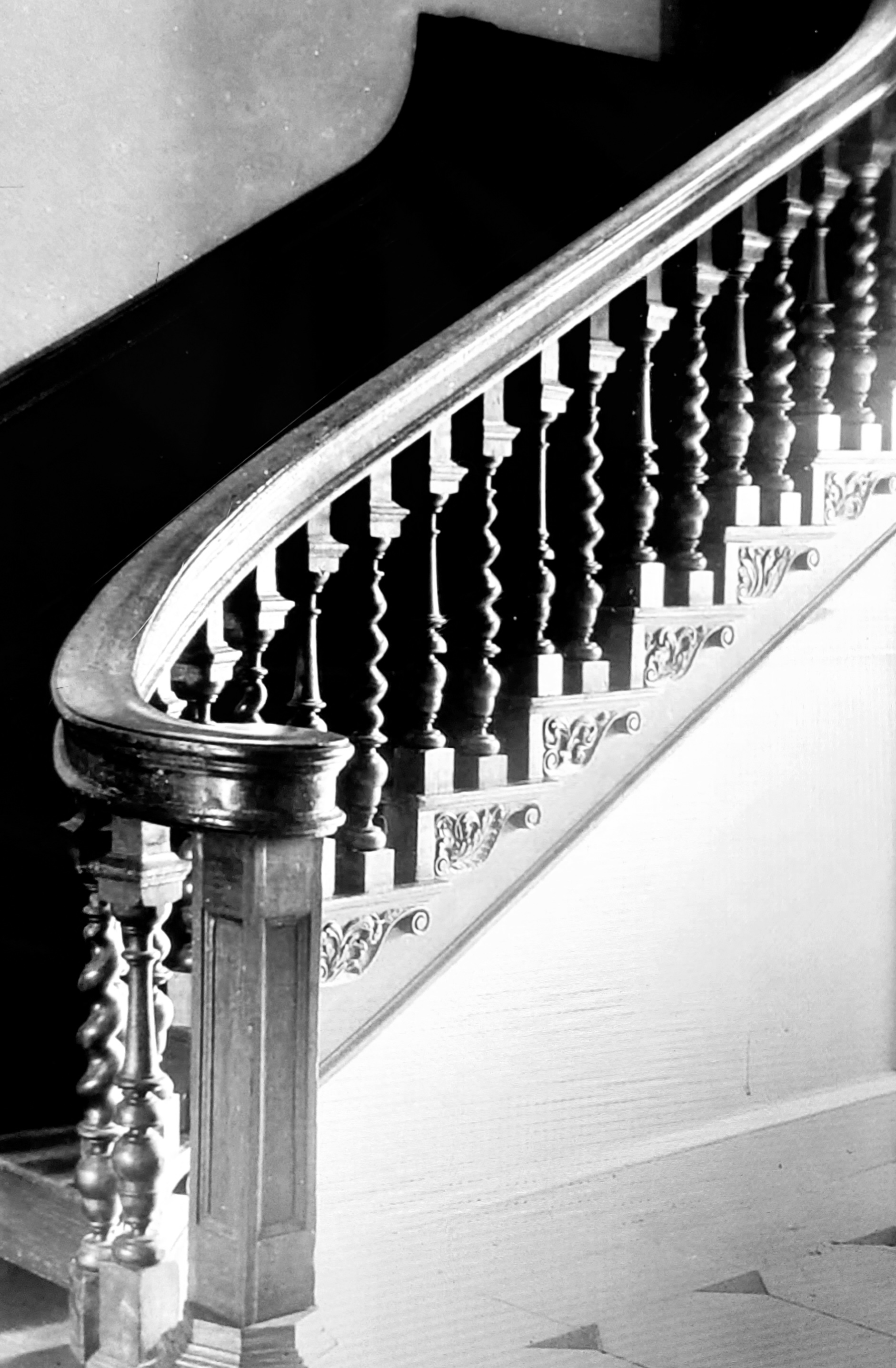
A staircase in the hall

The hall is built of brick with hipped roofs, the older part in stone slate and the newer part in Westmorland slate. The 18th-century part has two storeys, a basement and an attic, five bays, and a modillion cornice. Steps lead up to a doorway with a divided fanlight. Most of the windows are sashes, in the basement are fixed windows and a French window, and on the attics are pedimented dormers. The 19th-century part has two storeys and a basement, and three bays, the middle bay canted. The windows are sashes, and to the right is a single-storey greenhouse with a gabled porch.

Inside, the Oak Parlour retains its decoration of the 1620s, including a moulded plaster ceiling and frieze by John Burridge, a carved chimneypiece by Thomas Ventris, and panelling probably moved from the castle. The back staircase survives from the 1620s, while the main staircase dates from around 1730. On the first floor landing is a Jacobean arch decorated with masks, and an early-17th century chest. The Library has a carved overmantel and plastered ceiling from the 1620s, and the Heraldic Room has similar early features, incorporating heraldic designs in its frieze. The Drawing Room was originally the Great Hall, remodelled in the 1730s, and has its original chimneypiece and plasterwork.

== Park and garden ==
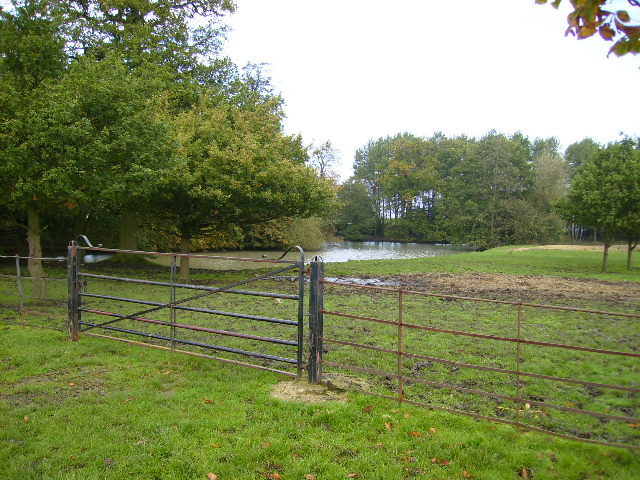
A pond in the park

A formal garden was laid out to the south east of the house by Arthur Ingram in the 1620s, including shrubs, trees and rose bushes brought from London. In 1637, Thomas Ventris carved 20 heraldic beasts, to serve as garden ornaments. In the 1730s, part of the former deer park was redesigned as pleasure grounds, to the north and east of the hall. The formal garden has a central lawn on a platform, with lower gardens to three sides, all mostly lawn. There is a terraced walk between them and various statues. The pleasure grounds are mostly wooded, with several ponds and an L-shaped lake which has been extended into the park. The park is in two sections; that to the southeast is used as pasture and has a statue of a Roman soldier. The western section is grassland with trees nearer the house, and arable land further away. The park and garden is grade II* listed.

== Rangers' House ==
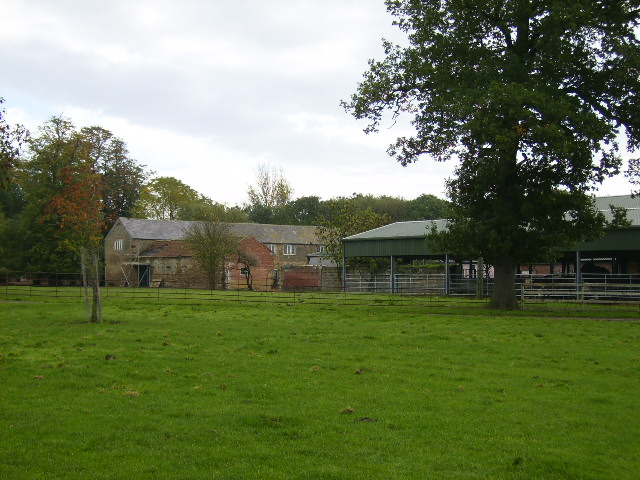
The Rangers' House

The rangers' house was built in 1638 as a stable and brewhouse, and was later converted into a private house. It is built of sandstone and limestone, with quoins and a Westmorland slate roof. There are two storeys and eight bays. To the left is a doorway over which is a heraldic plaque, and to its right is a casement window. The other windows are mullioned and transomed, and there is another doorway to the right with a chamfered surround.

== See also ==
- Grade I listed buildings in North Yorkshire (district)
- Listed buildings in Sheriff Hutton
- Listed parks and gardens in Yorkshire and the Humber
