= Farlington =

Farlington may refer to the following places in the United Kingdom:

- Farlington, Hampshire, in the suburbs of Portsmouth
- Farlington, North Yorkshire
