= Thomas Moseley =

Thomas Moseley may refer to:

- Thomas William Moseley, builder and designer of wrought-iron arch bridges
- Thomas Moseley (MP), member of the Parliament of England
