= Listed buildings in Sheriff Hutton =

Sheriff Hutton is a civil parish in the county of North Yorkshire, England. It contains 17 listed buildings that are recorded in the National Heritage List for England. Of these, two are listed at Grade I, the highest of the three grades, one is at Grade II*, the middle grade, and the others are at Grade II, the lowest grade. The parish contains the village of Sheriff Hutton and the surrounding area. The most important buildings in the parish are the Church of St Helen and the Holy Cross and Sheriff Hutton Hall, both of which are listed at Grade I. Most of the other listed buildings are structures associated with the hall, in the garden or grounds, and the others consist of a ruined castle, a tomb in the churchyard, and houses.

== Key ==
Grade	Criteria
I	Buildings of exceptional interest, sometimes considered to be internationally important
II*	Particularly important buildings of more than special interest
II	Buildings of national importance and special interest

== Buildings ==
Name and location	Photograph	Date	Notes	Grade
Church of St Helen and the Holy Cross; 54.08831°N 0.99646°W		12th century	The church has been altered and extended through the centuries. It is built in limestone and sandstone and has roofs of Welsh slate and lead. The church consists of a nave with a clerestory, north and south aisles, a chancel with north and south chapels and a north vestry, and a west tower clasped by the aisles. The tower has a west porch, a clock face, a string course, two-light bell openings, and an embattled parapet with gargoyles and crocketed pinnacles. The porch has a pointed doorway with three moulded orders.	I
Sheriff Hutton Castle; 54.08832°N 1.00491°W		1381	The castle, now in ruins, is built in sandstone and limestone. It has a rectangular plan, with four corner towers, up to four storeys in places, and between them are the remains of curtain walls. The gatehouse to the north of the southeast tower has an upper floor window opening, above which are four shields in relief.	II*
Sheriff Hutton Hall; 54.08191°N 0.99056°W		1619–24	A country house, it was remodelled in about 1730, and extended in 1848. It is in brick with hipped roofs, the older part in stone slate and the newer part in Westmorland slate. The 18th-century part has two storeys, a basement and an attic, five bays, and a modillion cornice. Steps lead up to a doorway with a divided fanlight. Most of the windows are sashes, in the basement are fixed windows and a French window, and on the attics are pedimented dormers. The 19th-century part has two storeys and a basement, and three bays, the middle bay canted. The windows are sashes, and to the right is a single-storey greenhouse with a gabled porch.	I
Two lengths of wall, Sheriff Hutton Hall; 54.08155°N 0.99043°W	—	c. 1620	The two lengths of wall are in the garden of the house, and are in brick with limestone coping. Each wall is about 4 metres (13 ft) in height and 60 metres (200 ft) in length, curving downwards to a statue at the end, except at the junction with gate piers.	II
First Amorini Statue, Sheriff Hutton Hall; 54.08129°N 0.99005°W	—	1638	The statue is at the end of a wall to the south of the house, it is in limestone and about 2.5 metres (8 ft 2 in) in height. The statue consists of a coved plinth, a pedestal with blind panels, and a moulded cornice surmounted by two quarrelling amorini.	II
Second Amorini Statue, Sheriff Hutton Hall; 54.08152°N 0.98960°W	—	1638	The statue is to the southeast of the house, it is in limestone and about 2.5 metres (8 ft 2 in) in height. The statue consists of a coved plinth, a pedestal with blind panels, and a moulded cornice surmounted by two amorini, now reconciled.	II
Gate piers, statues and gates, Sheriff Hutton Hall; 54.08137°N 0.98975°W	—	1638	The gateway in the garden to the southeast of the house is flanked by brick gate piers with limestone chamfered plinths and cornices. They are about 2 metres (6 ft 7 in) high, and each pier has a rectangular pedestal, a moulded cornice, and a limestone statue on a rounded base. On the left pier is a seated lion, and on the right pier is a unicorn. Between the piers are wrought iron gates.	II
Lion statue, Sheriff Hutton Hall; 54.08205°N 0.98967°W	—	1638	The garden sculpture is in limestone and about 0.5 metres (1 ft 8 in) in height. It consists of a lion with a damaged head seated on a rough base.	II
Statue of Alexander, Sheriff Hutton Hall; 54.08034°N 0.98824°W	—	1638	The statue in the garden, southeast of the house, is in limestone. It has a plain pedestal with a chamfered plinth and moulded cornice, and is surmounted by a statue in Roman military dress.	II
The Rangers' House; 54.08152°N 0.99166°W		1638	A stable and brewhouse, later a private house, it is in sandstone and limestone, with quoins and a Westmorland slate roof. There are two storeys and eight bays. To the left is a doorway over which is a heraldic plaque, and to its right is a casement window. The other windows are mullioned and transomed, and there is another doorway to the right with a chamfered surround.	II
Cornborough Villa; 54.09583°N 1.03752°W	—	17th century (possible)	The house is in sandstone, with a moulded eaves course, and a pantile roof with gable coping and shaped kneelers. There are two storeys and an L-shaped plan, with a garden front of four bays. The doorway has a channelled datestone with initials and the date 1742, and also on the front is a French window. The other windows are sashes with channelled lintels and keystones. Inside, there are inglenook fireplaces and bressumers.	II
Cornborough Hall; 54.10403°N 1.03072°W	—	Mid-18th century	The house is rendered, and has a floor band, a dentilled eaves cornice, and an M-shaped pantile roof with gable coping and shaped kneelers. There are two storeys, two parallel ranges and three bays. The central doorway has a divided fanlight, and the windows are sashes.	II
Gate piers and urns, Sheriff Hutton Hall; 54.08169°N 0.99065°W	—	Mid-18th century	The gate piers at the south-west entrance to the garden are in brick with limestone cornices and urns, and are about 4 metres (13 ft) in height. They are square in plan, and each pier has a moulded cornice and an urn surmounted by a pineapple.	II
Pedestal and urn, Sheriff Hutton Hall; 54.08198°N 0.98930°W	—	Mid-18th century	The pedestal and urn in the garden about 40 metres to the southeast of the house, are in limestone and about 2 metres (6 ft 7 in) in height. The pedestal is octagonal with a plain cornice, and it carries an urn with rosettes and swags surmounted by a ball finial.	II
Pedestal and urn on wall, Sheriff Hutton Hall; 54.08204°N 0.98986°W	—	Mid-18th century	The pedestal and urn are on a wall to the southeast of the house. The pedestal is rectangular, in brick, with a moulded limestone cornice, and it carries a limestone urn surmounted by a pineapple.	II
Tomb to the Atlay family 54.08814°N 0.99646°W	—	1779	The tomb is in the churchyard of the Church of St Helen and the Holy Cross, to the south of the church. It is in sandstone and has a square plan. There are inscriptions on all the faces, above which is a coved cornice, and a ball finial on a stepped base.	II
Ice house, Sheriff Hutton Hall; 54.08220°N 0.98989°W	—	Mid-19th century (probable)	The ice house is subterranean, and is approached by a passage in the outbuildings. It is egg-shaped, and lined in brick.	II
