= Listed buildings in Farlington, North Yorkshire =

Farlington is a civil parish in the county of North Yorkshire, England. It contains two listed buildings that are recorded in the National Heritage List for England. Both the listed buildings are designated at Grade II, the lowest of the three grades, which is applied to "buildings of national importance and special interest". The parish contains the village of Farlington and the surrounding countryside, and the listed buildings consist of a church and a farmhouse.

== Buildings ==
Name and location	Photograph	Date	Notes
St Leonard's Church; 54.09965°N 1.06138°W		16th century (probable)	The church has been altered and extended through the centuries, in particular by Ewan Christian in 1886. It is built in stone with a Welsh slate roof, and consists of a nave and a chancel in one unit, and a north porch. On the west gable is a bellcote with two arched openings and a cross finial. The south doorway has a round arch and a chamfered quoined surround, and the porch contains a doorway with a moulded surround.
Woodside; 54.09078°N 1.07644°W	—	Mid to late 18th century	A farmhouse in red-brown brick with a pantile roof and a T-shaped plan. The main range has two storeys and an attic and three bays, and contains a floor band, an eaves band, and a roof with raised verges and brick kneelers. The doorway has an architrave and a fanlight, and the windows are cross-casements. The rear wing has two storeys and three bays, and has dentilled eaves and raised verges. The windows are sashes, some horizontally-sliding.
