= St Leonard's Church, Farlington =

Church in Farlington, North Yorkshire, England

Coordinates: 54°05′59″N 1°03′41″W

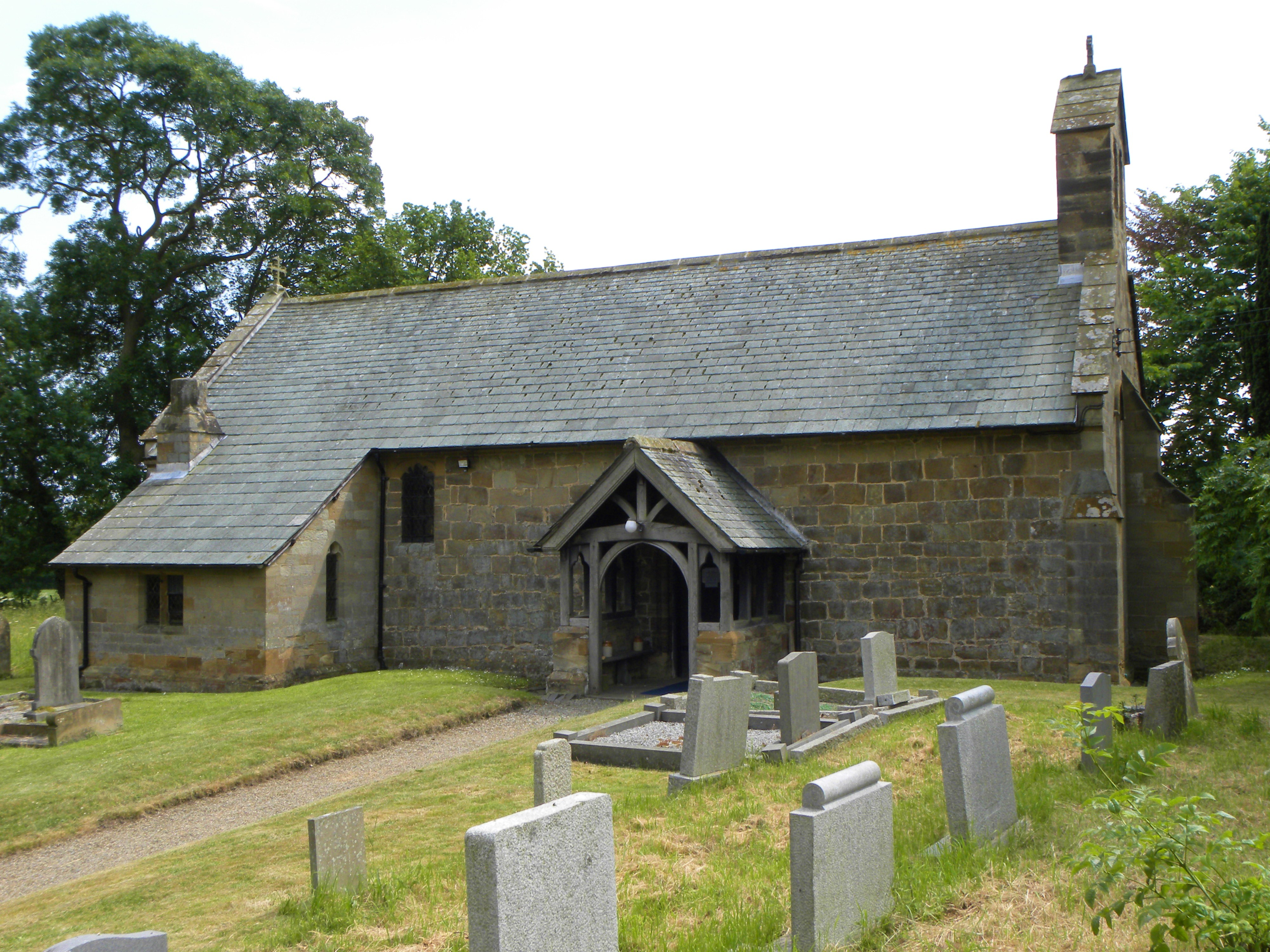
The church, in 2012

St Leonard's Church is an Anglican church in Farlington, North Yorkshire, a village in England.

The church was built about 1200, from which period survive most of the walls, the north and south doors, and the east windows. Buttresses were added to the south wall later in the 13th century. Two windows were added to the south wall of the chancel in the 15th century, and one in the south wall of the nave is probably 16th century. The church was heavily restored by Ewan Christian in 1886, with windows added or restored, the west end and its bellcote rebuilt, and a vestry and north porch added. The church was grade II listed in 1960.

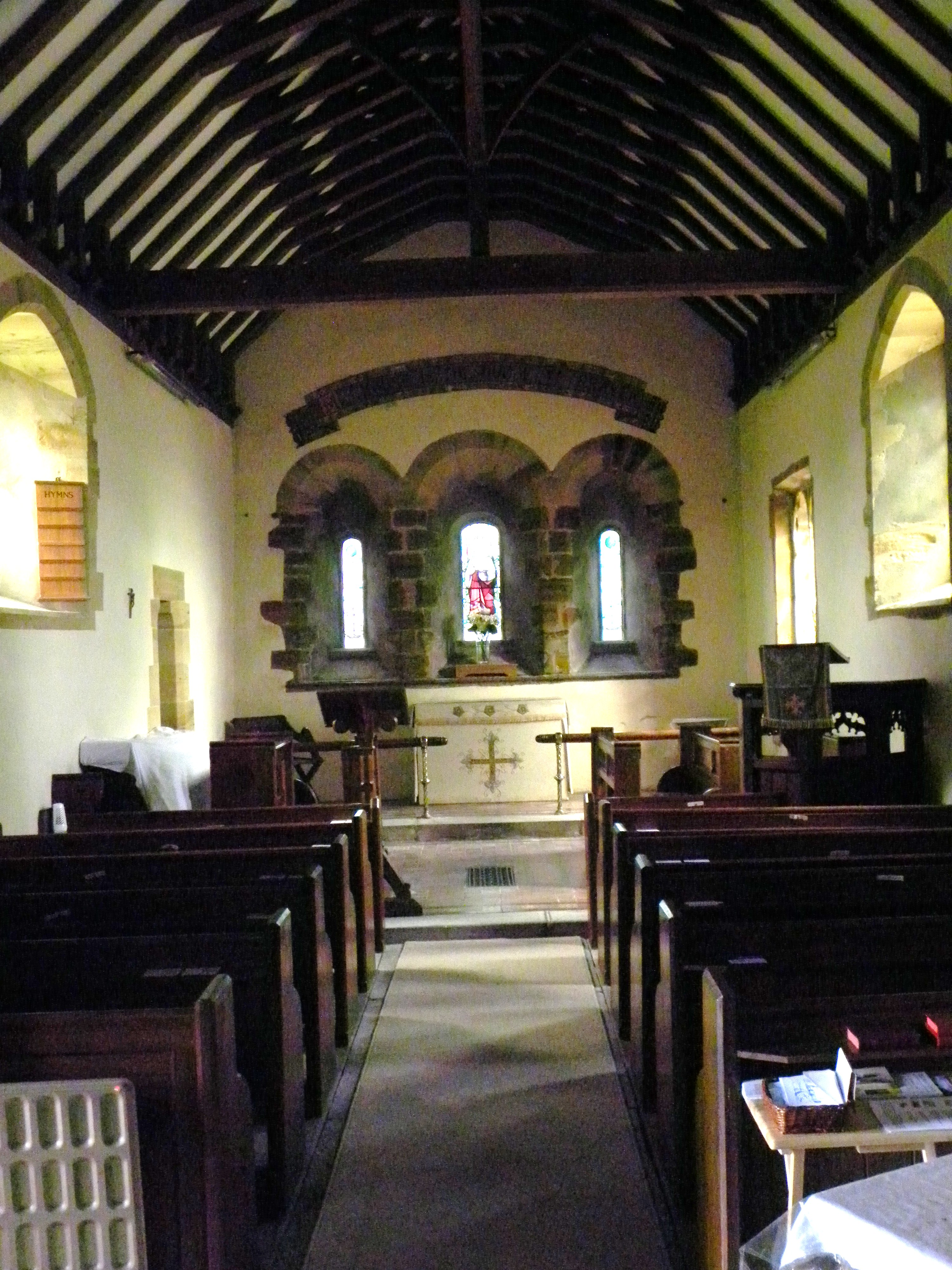
View from the nave into the chancel, in 2010

The church is built of stone with a Welsh slate roof, and consists of a nave and a chancel in one unit, and a north porch. On the west gable is a bellcote with two arched openings and a cross finial. The south doorway has a round arch and a chamfered quoined surround, and the porch contains a doorway with a moulded surround. Inside, there is a 19th-century crown post roof, an aumbry in the sanctuary, and a 13th-century font with an octagonal bowl and circular stem. The oak communion table is 17th century, and there is an old oak parish chest.

== See also ==
- Listed buildings in Farlington, North Yorkshire
