= Robert Brooke (16th century MP) =

English Member of Parliament

Member of the England Parliament for York
- In office 1584–1586
- Preceded by: Robert Askwith; Hugh Graves
- Succeeded by: William Hillard
- In office 1586–1588
- Preceded by: William Hillard
- Succeeded by: Andrew Trewe; James Birkby

Personal details
- Born: 1531 Hunslet
- Died: 1599 (aged 67–68) York
- Resting place: All Saints' Church, Pavement, York
- Spouse: Jane Maltby
- Relations: Percival (brother)
- Children: Christopher; Arthur; Henry; Robert; John; Samuel; Stephen; Sara; Susanna; Mary; Elizabeth; Jane

Robert Brooke was one of two Members of the Parliament of England for the constituency of York between 1584 and 1586 and also between 1586 and 1588.

== Life and politics ==
Robert was born in 1531 in Hunslet. His father was also named Robert. He married Jane, daughter of Christopher Maltby of Thornton in Pickering. They had seven sons and five daughters. His children were Christopher, Arthur, Henry, Robert, John, Samuel, Stephen, Sara, Susanna, Mary, Elizabeth and Jane. His son Christopher was an English poet, lawyer and politician who sat in the House of Commons between 1604 and 1626. His son Samuel was a Gresham Professor of Divinity, a playwright, the chaplain of Trinity College, Cambridge and subsequently the Master of Trinity (1629–1631)and in 1631 he was appointed archdeacon of Coventry. Robert's daughter Susanna married Thomas Marshall of Aislaby Grange, who became Lord Mayor of York in 1613. Robert's daughter Jane married Thomas Hesketh of Heslington Hall.

Robert became chamberlain of the city in 1565. In 1574 he was elected sheriff of York. He became an alderman on the ninth of March 1579 after the death of John Dynely. He became Lord mayor of the city in 1582 and again in 1595. Throughout this time he was a member of the common council. He was chosen for several commissions by the city, Parliament and the Crown. The city asked him, among others, to retrieve the city's play books in 1575. The Crown commissioned him to seek out Catholic priests in 1578. He was chosen to be MP for the city in 1584 and again in 1586.

Robert, like his brother Percival, was a merchant by trade and used his wealth to buy property in the city, becoming one of the wealthiest men there. He acquired tenements in Nessgate, Haymonger Lane, Walmgate and Fishergate as well as other lands outside the city.

Robert died in 1599 and was buried in the chancel of All Saints' Church in the Pavement.

Political offices
Preceded by Robert Askwith; Hugh Graves	Member of Parliament; 1584–1586	Next: William Hillard
Preceded by William Hillard	Member of Parliament; 1586–1588	Next: Andrew Trewe; James Birkby
