= St Helen and the Holy Cross Church, Sheriff Hutton =

Church in Sheriff Hutton, North Yorkshire, England

Coordinates: 54.0884°N 0.9964°W

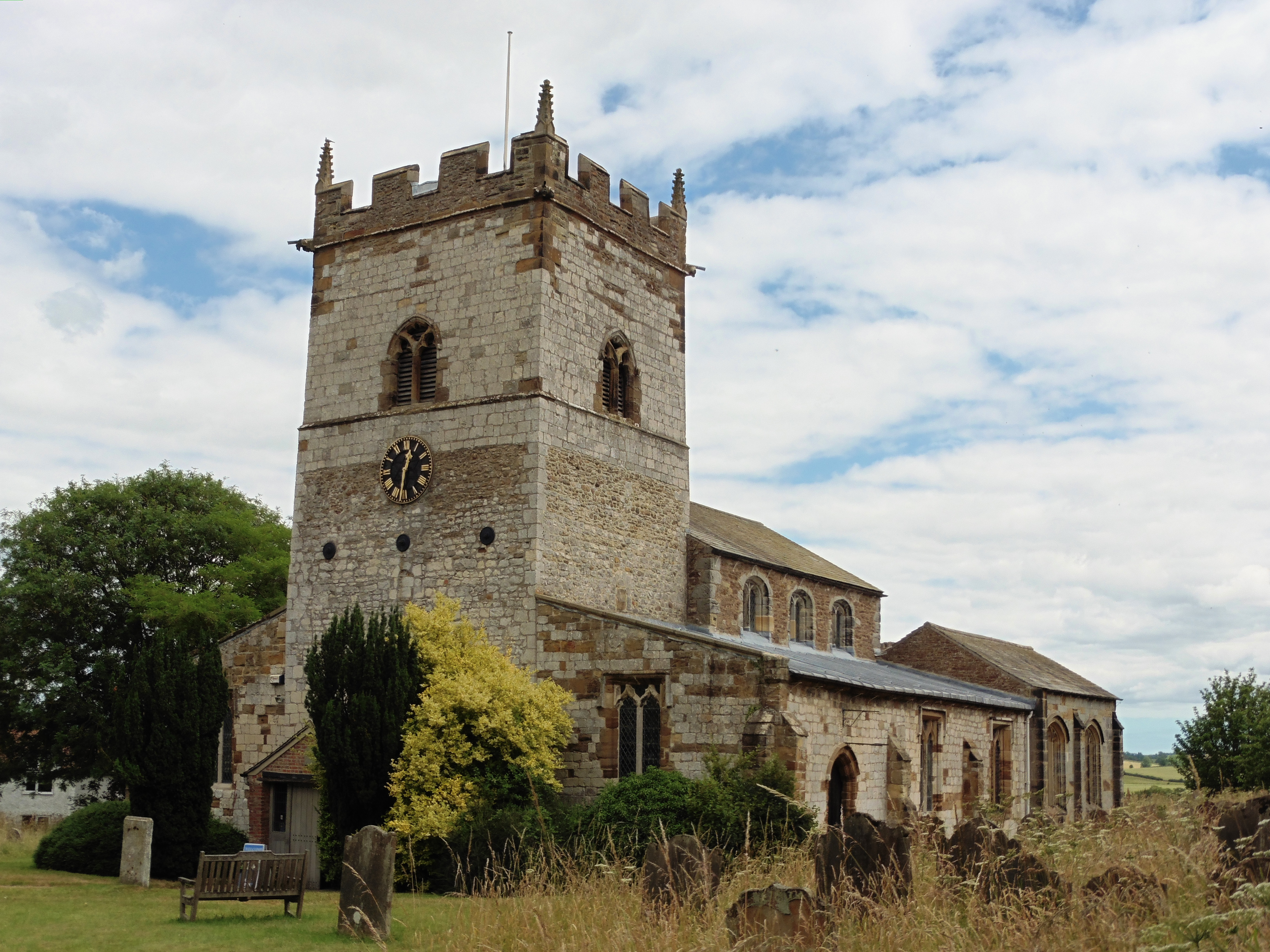
The church, in 2018

St Helen and the Holy Cross Church is the parish church of Sheriff Hutton, a village in North Yorkshire, in England.

The church was built early in the 12th century, from which period the lower part of the tower and parts of the east and west ends of the nave survive. The chancel was rebuilt in the 13th century, then in the 14th century, north and south aisles were added to the nave, and a north chapel to the chancel. In the early 15th century, the upper part of the tower was rebuilt. Later in the century, the chancel was heightened and its east wall was rebuilt, a vestry was added, a south chapel was added, and the north chapel was rebuilt. In the early 16th century, a clerestory was added to the nave. The west porch was added in the late 18th century. The building was grade I listed in 1954.

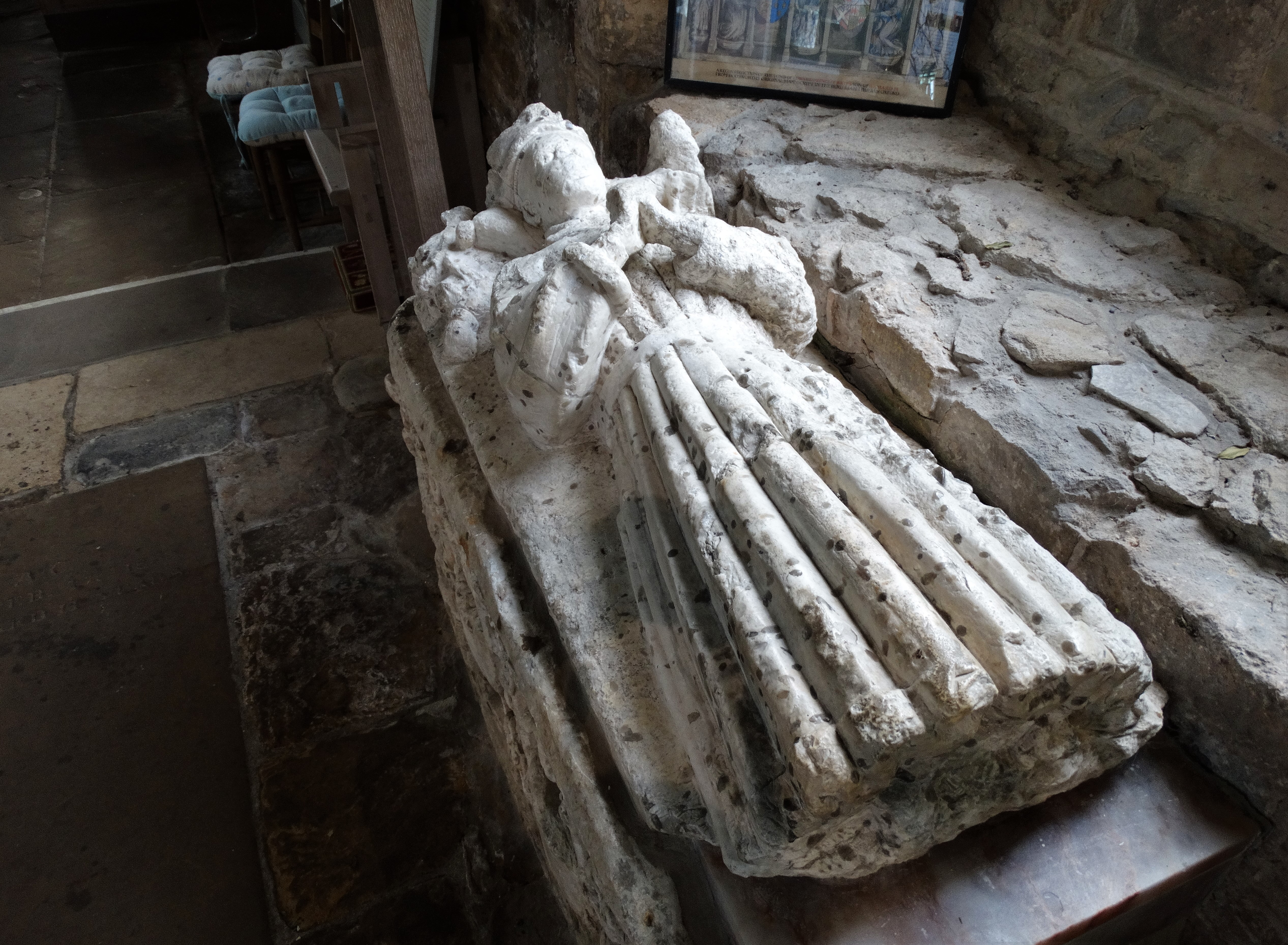
Effigy of a child

The church is built of limestone and sandstone and has roofs of Welsh slate and lead. It consists of a nave with a clerestory, north and south aisles, a chancel with north and south chapels and a north vestry, and a west tower clasped by the aisles. The tower has a west porch, a clock face, a string course, two-light bell openings, and an embattled parapet with gargoyles and crocketed pinnacles. The porch has a pointed doorway with three moulded orders.

Inside the church, there is a brass memorial to Dorothea and John Ffenys, dated 1491, and one to Thomas Witham, who died in 1489. There is an alabaster tomb with an effigy of a child, often said to be of Edward of Middleham but more likely from the early 15th century and possibly of Ralph Neville, who died in 1436. There is also a stone effigy of Edmund Thweng, who died in 1344. The altar rail is 17th century, and box pews dating from the 17th to the 19th centuries. One north aisle window has some 14th-century stained glass.

== See also ==
- Grade I listed buildings in North Yorkshire (district)
- Listed buildings in Sheriff Hutton
