= Thomas Witham =

Thomas Witham (or Wytham; c. 1420 – 15 April 1489) was an English Chancellor of the Exchequer under Kings Henry VI and Edward IV.

He was the son of Robert Witham of Grantham, Lincolnshire and the brother of William Witham, the Dean of Wells.

He was appointed Chancellor of the Exchequer by Henry VI in 1454 and again (for life) in 1456, which was confirmed in 1461 by Edward IV. He was reappointed in 1465 (possibly after illness) and finally resigned the post in 1469 to be replaced by Richard Fowler. Witham's tenure as Chancellor occurred during the Great Bullion Famine and the Great Slump in England. He then served the future Richard III as a counsellor.

He died in 1489 and was buried at St Helen and the Holy Cross Church, Sheriff Hutton, where he had endowed a chapel. He had married Agnes Thweng of Cornburgh but left no surviving children. However, his will of 1474 left money to several grandchildren.
