= Henry Hall (MP) =

English Member of Parliament

Member of the England Parliament for York
- In office 1601 (October) – 1604
- Preceded by: James Birkby; Thomas Moseley
- Succeeded by: Robert Askwith; Christopher Brooke

Personal details
- Born: Swillington, Yorkshire, England
- Died: 10 April 1620 Lillings Ambo, Yorkshire, England
- Spouse(s): Alice Birkby; Mary Beckwith
- Children: Henry; Grace; Ralph; Margaret; Elizabeth
- Education: Trinity College, Cambridge

Henry Hall was one of two Members of the Parliament of England for the constituency of York from 1601 to 1604. He served as Lord Mayor of York in 1600 and 1610, chamberlain of York from 1581 to 1582, sheriff of York from 1586 to 1587, and alderman from 1598 onwards. He joined the York Merchant Adventurers in 1578, eventually serving as its governor from 1592 to 1594.

== Life and politics ==
Henry was the son of Michael Hall of Leventhorpe and Elizabeth Claxton of Burnhall. He was educated at Trinity College, Cambridge in 1561. He was twice married. Firstly to Alice Birkby, with whom he had two sons and three daughters. They were Henry, Grace, Ralph, Margaret and Elizabeth. His second marriage was to Mary Beckwith, the daughter of Alderman William Beckwith. She had been widowed from Thomas Smithson and from Leonard Belt.

He was also the nephew of former Lord mayor of York and MP for the city, Ralph Hall. Henry was made a freeman of the city of York in 1575 and held the offices of Governor (1592 to 1594); Chamberlain (1581 to 1582); Sherriff (1587 to 1587); Alderman (1598) and Lord Mayor from 1600 to 1601 and again from 1610 to 1611. He was elected to the Parliament of 1601. Not much was recorded of his contributions.

He died in 1620 and was buried in All Saints Church, York.

Political offices
Preceded by James Birkby; Thomas Moseley	Member of Parliament; 1601–1604	Next: Robert Askwith; Christopher Brooke
