= Listed buildings in Lillings Ambo =

Lillings Ambo is a civil parish in the county of North Yorkshire, England. It contains two listed buildings that are recorded in the National Heritage List for England. Both the listed buildings are designated at Grade II, the lowest of the three grades, which is applied to "buildings of national importance and special interest". The parish is rural and does not contain a settlement of any significant size, and both the listed buildings are houses.

== Buildings ==
| Name and location | Photograph | Date | Notes |
|---|---|---|---|
| East Lilling Farmhouse; 54.06494°N 0.98861°W | — | Late 18th century | The house is in brick, with a dentilled eaves course, and a pantile roof with gable coping and shaped kneelers. There are two storeys and three bays. The doorway has a fanlight, and the windows are sashes with flat brick arches. |
| East Lilling Grange; 54.06815°N 0.99673°W | — | Early to mid 19th century | The house is in brick with a hipped Westmorland slate roof. There is a main range and a service cross-wing at the rear. The central doorway has pilasters with leaf capitals, and a radial fanlight. The windows are sashes with flat brick arches. |
