= Christopher Brooke (poet) =

English politician (died 1628)

Christopher Brooke (died 1628) was an English poet, lawyer and politician who sat in the House of Commons between 1604 and 1626.

== Life ==
He was the son of Robert Brooke, a rich merchant and alderman of York, who was twice lord mayor of that city. Anthony Wood states that he was educated at one of the universities; Sidney Lee thought it probable that, like his brother Samuel Brooke, he was a member of Trinity College, Cambridge. He subsequently studied law at Lincoln's Inn, and shared a chamber there with John Donne.

Shortly before Christmas 1601 he witnessed Donne's secret marriage with the daughter of Sir George More, lieutenant of the Tower of London, performed by his brother, Samuel Brooke, and witnessed by the father of the bride, who opposed the match and contrived to commit Donne and his two friends to Marshalsea Prison immediately afterwards. Donne was released first, and he secured the freedom of the Brookes after several weeks' imprisonment.

In 1604 Brooke was elected Member of Parliament for York. He was re-elected MP for York in 1614. He made his way at Lincoln's Inn, becoming a bencher and summer reader in 1614, and was a benefactor of the chapel. While at the Inns of Court he became acquainted with many literary men, among whom were John Selden, Ben Jonson, Michael Drayton, and John Davies of Hereford. William Browne lived on terms of intimacy with him, and to Donne he left by will his portrait of Elizabeth Wriothesley, Countess of Southampton. In 1621 he was re-elected MP for York. In 1624 he was elected for both York and Newport (Isle of Wight) and chose to sit for York. He was re-elected MP for York in 1625 and 1626.

He lived in a house of his own in Drury Lane, London, and inherited from his father houses at York, and other property there and in Essex. He was buried at St. Andrew's, Holborn, on 7 February 1628.

== Works ==
William Browne had a high opinion of his friend Brooke's poetic capacity. He eulogises him in Britannia's Pastorals, book ii. song 2. In the fifth eclogue of the Shepheard's Pipe, 1615, which is inscribed to Brooke, Browne urges him to attempt more ambitious poetry than the pastorals which he had already completed. Brooke's works are:

- An elegy on the death of Prince Henry, published with another elegy by William Browne in a volume entitled Two Elegies consecrated to the neverdying Memorie of the most worthily admyred, most hartily loved and generally bewailed prince, Henry, Prince of Wales, London, 1613.
- An eclogue appended to William Browne's Shepheard's Pipe, London, 1614.
- The Ghost of Richard the Third. Expressing himselfe in these three parts: 1, His Character; 2, His Legend; 3, His Tragedie, London, 1614. The unique copy in the Bodleian Library was reprinted by John Payne Collier for the Shakespeare Society in 1844, and by Alexander Balloch Grosart in 1872. It is dedicated to Sir John Crompton and his wife Frances. Thomas Rodd the bookseller first attributed this work to Brooke at the beginning of the 19th century. The only direct clue lies in 'C. B.', the signature of the dedication. George Chapman, William Browne, 'Fr. Dyune Int. Temp.,' George Wither, Robert Daborne, and Ben Jonson contributed commendatory verses.
- Epithalamium—a nuptiall song applied to the ceremonies of marriage, which appears at the close of England's Helicon, 1614.
- A Funerall Poem consecrated to the Memorie of that ever honoured President of Soldyership, Sr Arthure Chichester ... written by Christopher Brooke, gent., in 1624. This poem, to which Wither contributed commendatory verses, was printed for the first time by Grosart in 1872. The manuscript had been in the possession of James Bindley, Richard Heber, and Thomas Corser. Corser printed selections in his Collectanea, and Joseph Haslewood described it in the British Bibliographer, ii. 235.

Brooke also contributed verses to Michael Drayton's Legend of the Great Cromwell, 1607; to Thomas Coriat's Odcombian Banquet, 1611; to Henry Lichfield's First Set of Madrigals, 1614 (two pieces, one to the Lady Cheyney and another to the author); and to Browne's Britannia's Pastorals, 1625. He also wrote (20 December 1597) inscriptions for the tombs of Elizabeth, wife of Charles Croft, and of the wife of Thomas Crompton.

== Family ==
Brooke married Mary Jacob on 18 December 1619 at the church of St. Martin's-in-the-Fields by Charing Cross. Formerly married to Sir Robert Jacobe, Solicitor General for Ireland, who died in 1618, she continued to be known as 'Lady Jacob' even after her marriage to Brooke. She was the daughter of the merchant William Lynch (or Linch) of Southampton (died 1617) and first married David Targett, a sailor of Southampton (died 1602) by whom she had a son, William (died 1627), later a soldier serving in Denmark. She had five children by her marriage to Jacob, at least one of whom, Mary, survived her: and from her last marriage she had a son, John Brooke. Lady Jacob had the reputation of a female 'wit' and once caused comment by ridiculing Count Gondomar, the Spanish Ambassador. Her numerous critics called her "Lusty Mall Targett". She predeceased Brooke in 1622, being spiritually supported in her last illness by his friend Dr. Donne.

== Notes ==
Parliament of England
Preceded by Sir John Bennet; Henry Hall	Member of Parliament for York; 1604–1626; With: Robert Askwith; Sir Arthur Ingram	Succeeded by Sir Arthur Ingram; Sir Thomas Savile
Preceded by Philip Fleming; Sir William Uvedale	Member of Parliament for Newport (Isle of Wight); 1624; With: John Danvers	Succeeded by John Danvers; Philip Fleming
