= Forest of Galtres =

Coordinates: 54.1198°N 1.1897°W

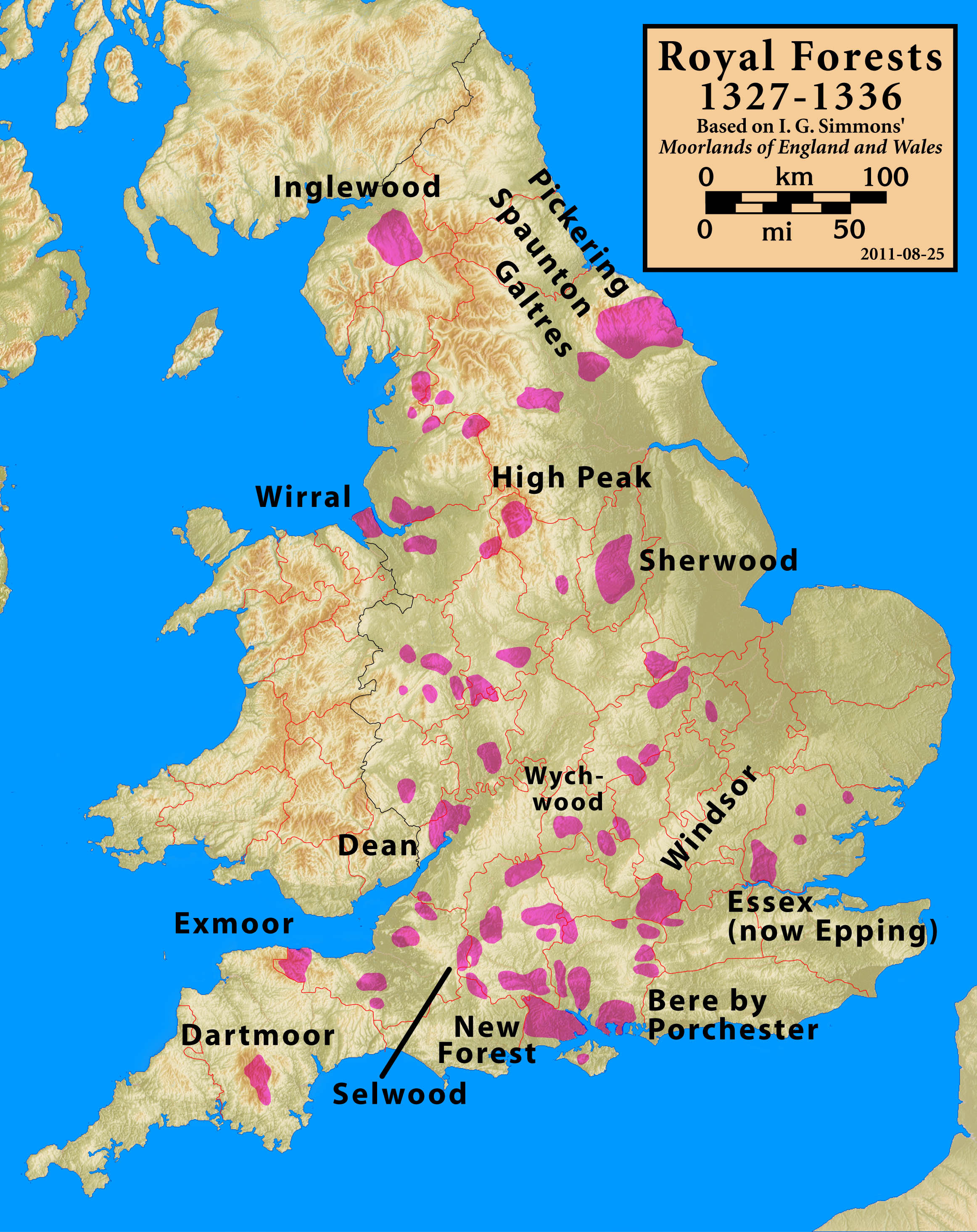

The royal Forest of Galtres was established by the Norman kings of England in North Yorkshire, to the north of the Ancient City of York, extending right to its very walls. The main settlement within the royal forest was the market village of Easingwold, but in 1316 the forest comprised 60 villages in 100,000 acres. The Forest of Galtres was intimately connected with York: Davygate in the city was the site of the forest court and prison, a royal liberty within the city of York; Davygate, from which the forest was administered, commemorates David Le Lardiner, whose father, John the Lardiner, was the Royal Lardiner (steward of the larder, in this case providing venison as well as "tame beasts") for the Forest of Galtres, a title which became hereditary in the family. During the reign of Henry II, the Forest stood at its greatest extent, but by the fifteenth century, concerns were being voiced over the extent of deforestation.

Aside from the kings' pleasure in deer hunting, the forest was a dependable source of timber. For the timber palisades of York Castle, which preceded the stone construction of the 13th century, Galfredo de Cumpton, forestario de Gauterio ("forester of Galtres"), was ordered to supply timbers from the Forest to York, to repair the bridge and breaches in the palicium, in 1225.

During the Middle Ages, other rights in the royal forests were also valuable, though they conflicted with the preservation of trees. Pannage, the practice of turning out domestic pigs, in order that they may feed on fallen acorns, beechmast, chestnuts or other nuts, was so important that the Domesday Book often valued forest in terms of its capacity to support pigs. The king's foresters collected fees for pannage rights in a typical year, 1319, from pig farmers, at least one of whom was a pork butcher of York. Some appointments were for a lifetime: on 14 June 1626 Charles I granted footfostership, the keepership of the king's deer in Galtres, to James Rosse, with 4d per diem. Defending the valuable traditional rights of the local peasantry to pasturage within the confines of Galtres led to violence against incursions, even ones legitimated by the king's will: a band of forty armed men assembled from five villages threw down enclosures and burned hedges in the Forest of Galtres in the plague year of 1348.

Within the Forest of Galtres a motte-and-bailey castle was built at the site of Sheriff Hutton by Ansketil de Bulmer on land given to him by William the Conqueror; it was rebuilt in 1140 by Bertram de Bulmer, Sheriff of York, during the reign of King Stephen The extant remains of the stone-built Sheriff Hutton Castle were built at the western end of the village by John, Lord Neville in 1382–98.

The poet John Skelton set his musing dream in "The Garlande of Laurell" (1523), "studyously dyuysed at Sheryfhotton Castell, in the Forest of Galtres", where

That me to reste, I lent me to a stump
Of an oke, that sometyme grew full streyghte...

Whylis I stode musynge in this medytatyon
In slumbringe I fell and halfe in a slepe...

From the poem the reader learns that Elizabeth, Countess of Surrey, with the ladies of her household, was living at Sheriff Hutton. At the time it was a seat of her father-in-law the Duke of Norfolk, who was occupied as general-in-chief of an army raised for the invasion of Scotland.

It is referred to in Shakespeare's play Henry IV, Part 2 under the anglicised name of "Gaultree Forest".

== Disafforestation ==
During the second quarter of the 17th century, Galtres was disafforested piecemeal, as a result of the Crown's desperate need for ready money. In 1625 a survey was drawn up in relation to the impending sale of the demesne of Sheriff Hutton, which incidentally revealed the ghostly presence of the former village of East Lilling within the park, recalled by the jurors:

East Lilling it is called and retaineth the name of East Lilling township though at this day there do remain but only one house. But by tradition and by apparent ancient buildings and ancient ways for horse and cart visibly discerned and leading unto the place where the town stood within Sheriff Hutton park, it hath been a hamlet of some capacity, though now utterly demolished"

The house known as Sheriff Hutton Park, south-east of the village, was built in 1621 for Sir Arthur Ingram, whose main seat was Temple Newsam; it was recased in more up-to-date style in 1732 for a member of the Thompson family.

Master carpenter Thomas Lickard purchased an unknown acreage north of Sutton from the Crown in 1631, thought to be 200 acres or more. He cultivated, felled and sawed oak trees for use in the construction of buildings in York and surrounding towns and villages, and transported them as far away as Nottingham. It is said that oak from Galtres Forest was held in a higher esteem than oak from Sherwood Forest.

Thomas Wentworth, 1st Earl of Strafford held a new park enclosed within Galtres in 1633 and was attempting unsuccessfully to purchase it outright; Sir John Bourchier had lands in Galtres and was fined and even imprisoned for destroying the fences of Strafford's new park there. Sir Allen Apsley accepted Crown lands in Galtres in lieu of the debt owed him by Charles I.

The Act of Dis-Afforestation of 1629 put an end to the Forest.

When York Guildhall was reconstructed after wartime bomb damage, a single oak tree trunk from the Forest of Galtres was used for each oak pillar.

== Legacy ==
The name is commemorated in several North Yorkshire schools, the Forest of Galtres Golf Course, Galtres Retreat & Lodge Park and the Forest of Galtres Festival which started life at Crayke, near Easingwold but has now moved to Duncombe Park, Helmsley
