= John Bennet (judge) =

English judge, privy councillor, chancellor, and politician

Sir John Bennet
- Arms of Bennet: Gules, a bezant between three demi-lions rampant argent
- Born: 18 June 1553; Wallingford, Berkshire
- Died: 15 February 1627 (aged 73); Southwark, Surrey
- Spouse: Lady Anne Weekes (m. 1586)
- Children: 7+, including Sir John Bennet of Dawley
- Father: Richard Bennet of Clapcot
- Relatives: Henry Bennet, 1st Earl of Arlington (grandson); John Bennet, 1st Baron Ossulston (grandson)

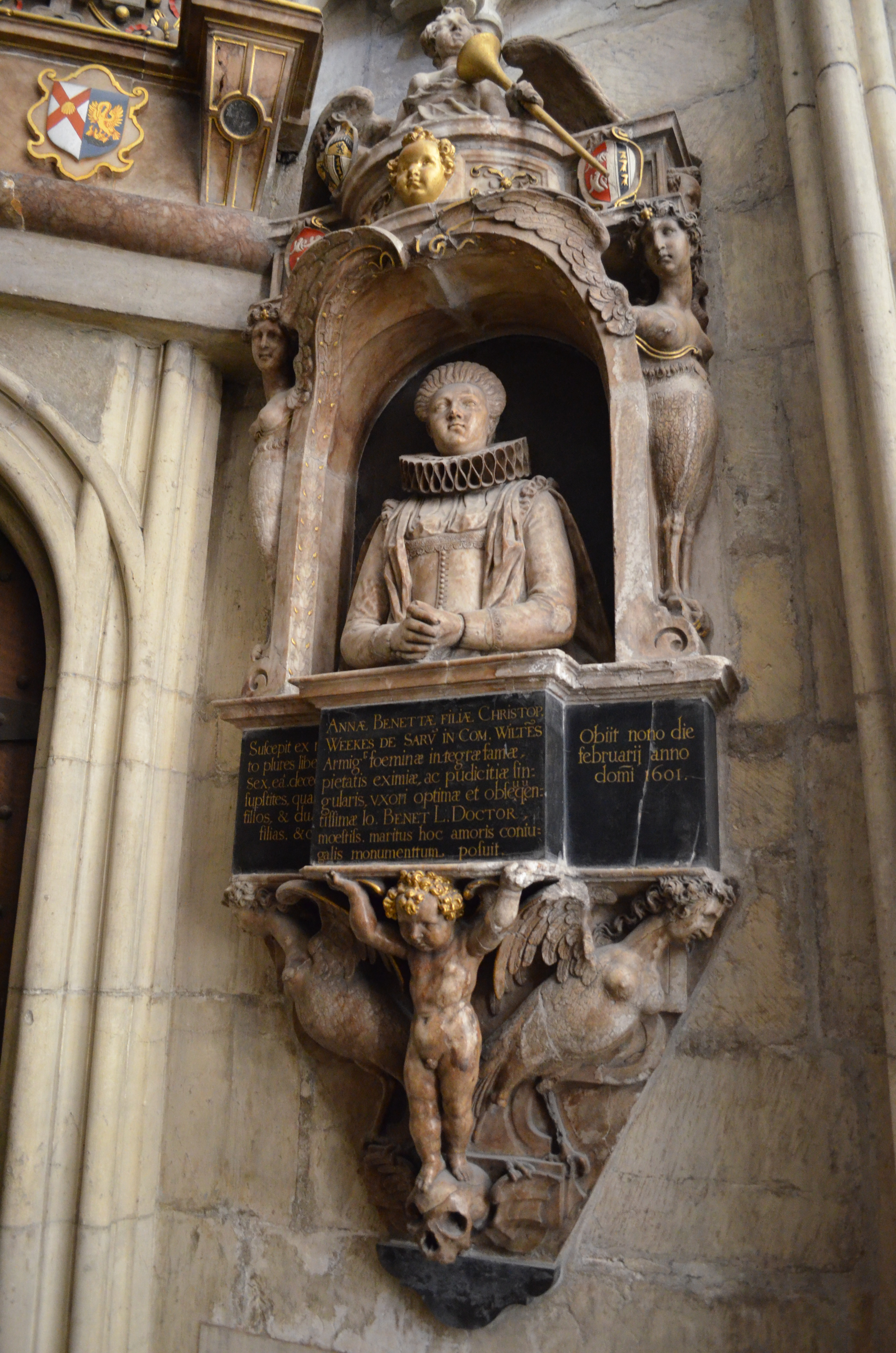
Mural monument in York Minster to Anne Weekes, 1st wife of Sir John Bennet

Sir John Bennet (1553 – 15 February 1627) was a civil lawyer, ecclesiastical judge, diplomat, royal commissioner, university administrator, politician, and devotional writer, who sat in the House of Commons between 1597 and 1621. Educated at both Oxford and Cambridge, he held many senior legal and ecclesiastical offices including Chancellor of Queen Anne's Household, Vicar General and Chancellor of the Diocese of York, Judge of the Prerogative Court of Canterbury, Judge of the Admiralty Court, and Master in Chancery in ordinary, to name but a few. He served repeatedly as a member of parliament, representing Ripon, York, and Oxford University, he sat on numerous royal commissions, acted as envoy to Brussels, rebuilt the University Schools at Oxford alongside Sir Thomas Bodley, and was a Founding Governor of Pembroke College. Regarded in his lifetime as one of Oxford University's "three worthies," Bennet played an influential role in the academic, legal, and political life of Early-Stuart England. His career eventually ended in controversy after he was found guilty of extorting bribes and excessive fees, though his family retained their estates. Whilst confined to Fleet Prison, he wrote his devotional work The Psalme of Mercy or, A Meditation vpon the 51. Psalme, by a true Penitent which gives deep insight into the mind of a man grappling with the moral and psychological consequences of sin, temptation, and self-examination.

== Education ==
Bennet was the second son of Richard Bennet of Clapcot, Berkshire (now in Oxfordshire) and his wife, Elizabeth Tesdale, the daughter of Thomas Tesdale of Stanford Dingley and Abingdon. She was the half-sister of Thomas Tesdale, the founder of Pembroke College, Oxford. He was probably educated at John Roysse's Free School in Abingdon (now Abingdon School). of which his family were benefactors. He matriculated at Christ Church, Oxford in 1573. He was awarded BA on 11 June 1577 and was promoted to MA on 15 June 1580. In 1583 he was incorporated at Cambridge and awarded MA there. He returned to Oxford and was elected a proctor in 1585. He was awarded his BCL and DCL by special dispensation on 6 July 1589.

In 1590 Bennet was admitted as an advocate in the Court of Arches.

== Career ==
Bennet began his career as vicar-general and chancellor in the Diocese of York, probably through the influence of John Piers, the Archbishop of York, who had been the Dean of Christ Church. He was joint commissary of the exchequer court. In 1591 he was appointed to the prebend of Langtoft. In 1594 he was appointed J.P. for the East Riding of Yorkshire. He advanced his career in other areas, serving as a legal adviser to a commission negotiating with Scotland about the security of the border, and in 1599 was appointed to the Council of the North.

In 1597, Bennet was elected Member of Parliament for Ripon. He was elected MP for York in 1601. He was knighted at Whitehall on 23 July 1603. In 1603 or 1604 he became judge of the Prerogative Court of Canterbury, retaining his positions in York as commissary until 1609 and chancellor until 1624. He was elected MP for Ripon again in 1604. During his time in Parliament, he defended the ecclesiastical courts but was unsuccessful in preventing a bill prohibiting married men residing with their families in the colleges of Oxford and Cambridge Universities. He was a member of the High Court of Delegates, hearing appeals from ecclesiastical and admiralty courts, and the Court of High Commission. In 1608 he was appointed Master in Chancery in Ordinary and in 1611 was appointed to the council of Queen Anne, wife of James I. He was growing in wealth and status and is reported to have offered £30,000 to become Lord Chancellor, without success.

Bennet, who was interested in the affairs of Oxford University, was asked by Sir Thomas Bodley to act as fund-raiser for the Bodleian Library, a task he carried out efficiently. Bennet was one of the first governors of Pembroke College, Oxford. He was elected MP for Oxford University in 1614 and 1621. However, he was accused by Richard Kilvert in Parliament of extracting bribes and excessive fees in his judicial work. The issue was debated in his absence, Bennet pleading ill-health, and it was decided that he should be expelled from the House of Commons and the case referred to the House of Lords. He was placed under house arrest. When he appeared before the House of Lords, he said that he could account for all but £4,000 of the money that had passed through his hands. He was bailed in the sum of £20,000 and ordered to pay to Oxford University £1,000 that he still had as executor of Thomas Bodley's estate: he only paid £550. When the case was eventually tried, Bennet's counsel put up a weak defence. Bennet was fined £20,000, but punishments of imprisonment and disqualification from office were later lifted. It was said that his profiteering from his post overshadowed that of Francis Bacon: "Sir John Bennet hath made my Lord Chancellor an honest man". From London, on the 7th Jul 1624, Lord Francis Bacon writes to King James I, “I prostrate myself at your Majesty’s feet; I, your ancient servant, now sixty-four years old in age, and three years five months old in misery. I desire not from your Majesty means, nor place, nor employment, but only, after so long a time of expiation, a complete and total remission of the sentence of the Upper House, to the end that blot of ignonimy may be removed from me, and from my memory with posterity; that I die not a condemned man, but may be to your Majesty, as I am to God, nova creatura. Your Majesty hath pardoned the like to Sir John Bennet, between whose case and mine (not being partial to myself, but speaking out of the general opinion) there was as much difference, I will not say as between black and white, but as between black and gray, or ash-coloured. Look therefore down, dear Sovereign, upon me also in pity.”

== The Psalme of Mercy (1625) ==
While historians of psychology have generally traced the articulation of causal models of mind to the mid-seventeenth-century mechanistic turn associated with René Descartes and Thomas Hobbes, it has been argued that the devotional treatise The Psalme of Mercy or, A Meditation vpon the 51. Psalme, by a true Penitent by Sir John Bennett, indicates that sequential conceptions of cognition and action were already being articulated within the introspective theological literature of early-Stuart England. The passage under consideration appears on pages 92 and 93 of The Psalme of Mercy or, A Meditation vpon the 51. Psalme, by a true Penitent (1625), written by Sir John Bennet while confined in the Fleet Prison following his impeachment from judicial office. Within this devotional meditation Bennett outlines an inward progression:

“I was conceived in finne:] And therefore there is no finne that I am not apt and ready to conceive, yea, to engender, and produce from imagination, to assent; from assent, to delectation; from delectation, to resolution; from resolution, to execution.”

On p. 92, he confessed that from his “sinfull passions” and “euill affections” flow his “sinnes of action, or omission.” The text traces the process by which inward temptation issues in overt sin. Bennet sets out a sequence in which internal states (imagination, assent, delectation) generate volitional decisions (resolution) that result in outward behaviour (execution). The marginal “Aug. Confef.” (For Augustine, Confessions), indicates Bennet’s reliance on Augustinian psychology of temptation, though the five-stage syntax is his own elaboration, not a citation. There is no doubt that Bennett’s vocabulary draws on Augustinian and Scholastic moral psychology, but his contribution is its systematic formalisation.

This formulation precedes the well-documented mechanistic accounts of mind by Hobbes and Descartes, yet it has remained entirely overlooked in the historical narrative of cognitive theory for centuries. Bennet’s devotional treatise, rooted in introspective theology, provides what may be the earliest extant English expression of a sequential model linking mental activity to behavioural outcome in this manner. By reframing cognition as a function of spiritual self-regulation, Bennet not only extends Augustine’s moral psychology but also, it can be argued, anticipates later philosophical developments. This challenges the prevailing view that modern cognitive theory emerged solely from philosophical or scientific discourse, suggesting instead that its conceptual roots may lie in the affective and penitential culture of early-Stuart religious thought.

There is no evidence that Bennet consciously anticipated mechanistic psychology, nor that he intended to formulate a cognitive model in the modern sense; rather, it would be more apt to assert that his devotional sequencing incidentally reproduced a structure that later theorists would formalise explicitly. Considering the texts obscurity, despite its publication in London at the time, it would be an overreach to suggest that Bennet explicitly influenced these later theorists, as there appears to be no explicit evidence of such at this time.

== Personal life ==
Bennet married firstly Alice Weekes daughter of Christopher Weekes of Salisbury, and had four sons and two daughters. She died in 1601 and he married secondly Elizabeth Lowe, daughter of Sir Thomas Lowe, alderman of London. She died in 1614 and he married thirdly Leonora daughter of Adrian Vierandeels of Antwerp, a widow. Leonora wore a large English-style farthingale in Amsterdam, and received unwelcome attention from the local people.

Bennet died on 15 February 1627 and was buried at Christ Church, Newgate, City of London.

== See also ==
- List of Old Abingdonians

== Sources ==
- Rigg, James McMullen (1885). "Bennet, John (d.1627)" . In Stephen, Leslie (ed.). Dictionary of National Biography. Vol. 4. London: Smith, Elder & Co.

Parliament of England
Preceded by Anthony Wingfield; William Bennet	Member of Parliament for Ripon; 1597; With: Christopher Perkins	Succeeded by Christopher Perkins; John Thornborough
Preceded by James Birkby; Thomas Moseley	Member of Parliament for York; 1601; With: Henry Hall	Succeeded by Roger Askwith; Christopher Brooke
Preceded by Christopher Perkins; John Thornborough	Member of Parliament for Ripon; 1604; With: Sir John Mallory	Succeeded by Sir Thomas Posthumous Hoby; William Mallory
Preceded by Sir Thomas Crompton; Sir Daniel Donne	Member of Parliament for Oxford University; 1614–1621; With: Sir Daniel Donne 1614; Sir Clement Edmondes 1621	Succeeded by Sir Isaac Wake; Sir George Calvert
