= Clement Edmondes =

16th/17th-century English politician and civil servant

Sir Clement Edmondes (c. 1568–1622) was an English government official and politician who sat in the House of Commons at various times between 1609 and 1622.

== Background and education ==
Edmondes was son of Sir Thomas Edmondes of Shrawardine, Shropshire. His father was comptroller of Queen Elizabeth's Household. In 1585, he became a clerk or chorister at All Souls College, Oxford. After graduation, he became a Fellow of All Souls in 1589. He was later living in a park at Castle Hedingham, and may therefore have been in the service of the Earl of Oxford or another of his family. In 1600, he published Observations, upon the Five First Bookes of Caesar's Commentaries, followed the next year by a similar work on the Sixth and Seventh books. This was dedicated to his 'honourable friend' Sir Francis Vere. He was present at the battle of Nieuwpoort and referred in his works to the sieges of Ostend (1601–4) and Grave, in Brabant (1602).

== Career ==
In 1601, Edmondes obtained the post of Assistant Remembrancer of the City of London, and succeeded as Remembrancer on the resignation of Dr Giles Fletcher, with a salary of £100. In 1608, he was involved in the negotiations for a loan from the city to James I. He was appointed a Clerk of the Privy Council on 13 August 1609. When he resigned as Remembrancer, the City gave him 40 angels to buy a cloak.

In November 1609 Edmondes was elected Member of Parliament for Carnarvon in a by-election. He was appointed Muster Master General in 1613. In 1615 he was sent on a diplomatic mission to the Netherlands to investigate coordinating English and Dutch East India trade. He then wrote a wide-ranging account of the country (unpublished). He was knighted on 29 September 1617.

In 1618, Edmondes was dispatched to the fens to report on the conflicts over draining them. He spent time surveying the rivers and recommended that the Commissioners of Sewers should enforce their decrees and should begin by clearing the outfalls of the rivers River Nene and River Welland.

In 1621 Edmondes was elected Member of Parliament for Oxford University, but took little part in the debates. He was appointed a Secretary of State, but died (of apoplexy) before taking office. He was buried at Preston Deanery, near Northampton, where he had acquired the manor in 1620.

== Family ==
Edmondes married Mary Clerk, daughter of Robert Clerk of Grafton, Northamptonshire, in 1598. She was an attendant upon Lady Stafford.

Parliament of England
Preceded by John Griffith	Member of Parliament for Carnarvon; 1609–1611	Succeeded by Nicholas Griffith
Preceded by Sir Daniel Dun; Sir John Bennet	Member of Parliament for Oxford University; 1621–1622; With: Sir John Bennet	Succeeded by Isaac Wake; Sir George Calvert
