= Thomas Moseley (MP) =

Member of the Parliament of England

Member of the England Parliament for York
- In office 1597–1601
- Preceded by: Andrew Trewe; James Birkby
- Succeeded by: Sir John Bennet; Henry Hall (MP)

Personal details
- Born: 1539 North Castle Grange, Cawthorne
- Died: 1624 (aged 84–85) York
- Spouse: Jane
- Children: Jane

Thomas Moseley (1539–1624) was one of two Members of the Parliament of England for the constituency of York between 1597 and 1601.

== Life and politics ==
Thomas lost his father early in life and lived with John Beane, an alderman and MP for the city. After serving an apprenticeship with his uncle, he spent time in Hamburg as part of his duties as a member of the merchant's company. He was frequently in financial trouble but this did not affect him being elected alderman for the Walmgate Ward of York. Even though he polled second in Parliamentary elections in 1593, the city assembly rejected him. After changes to the election system, he was successful in being elected to the 1597 Parliament. There is no record of any speeches in the House, but he did serve on numerous merchant related committees.

Thomas married Jane, youngest daughter of John Wormeley of Hatfield. They had at least one daughter, Jane, who married Robert Sowtheby (also known as Sotheby), at St John's Church in York on 7 August 1621.

Political offices
Preceded by Andrew Trewe; James Birkby	Member of Parliament; 1597–1601	Next: Sir John Bennet; Henry Hall (MP)
