= Sheriff Hutton Castle =

Castle in North Yorkshire, England

- Sheriff Hutton, North Yorkshire in England
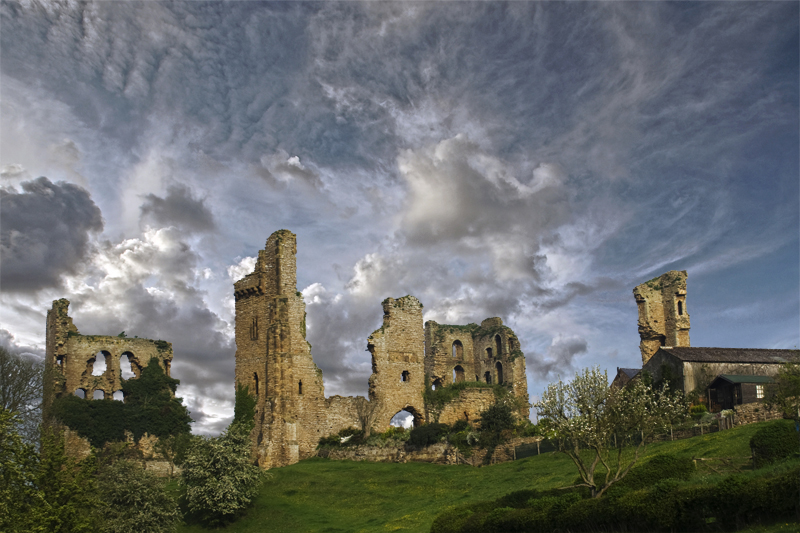

Site information
- Type: Stone quadrangular fortress
- Owner: Private
- Open to the public: No

Location
- Location of Sheriff Hutton Castle
- Coordinates: 54°05′16″N 1°00′17″W
- Height: 98 feet (30 m)

Site history
- Built: c. 1135–1154 (original site) c. 1382 (second site)
- Materials: Sandstone

Sheriff Hutton Castle is a ruined quadrangular castle in the village of Sheriff Hutton, North Yorkshire, England. The site of the castle is 10 miles (16 km) north of York, and 8 miles (13 km) south-east of Easingwold.

== History ==
The original motte and bailey castle, the remains of which can be seen to the south of the churchyard, was built here in the Forest of Galtres by Bertram de Bulmer, Sheriff of York during the reign of King Stephen (c. 1135–1154).

The stone castle was built at the western end of the village by John, Lord Neville in the late fourteenth century. In 1377, John Neville obtained a charter for a market on Monday and an annual fair on the eve of the exaltation of the Holy Cross (14 September). A licence to crenellate was granted by Richard II in 1382, although it is unknown whether building work had commenced before this date. The building has been credited to John Lewyn, who also built nearby Bolton Castle in 1378, on stylistic and documentary grounds. Stylistic details in common with Bolton include the tower parapets stepping up to form turrets, as well as the general arrangement of a quadrangle with massive rectangular corner towers. This arrangement was popular for castles in the north of England in the late 14th century, also being used at Wressle (Yorkshire) and Lumley (Durham), as well as the rather earlier Chillingham (Northumberland).

The castle passed to John's son, Ralph Neville, the first Earl of Westmorland. Upon Ralph's death in 1425, the Neville estates were partitioned. Ralph's grandson, Ralph Neville, 2nd Earl of Westmorland, retained the title and the Durham estates and his younger son by his second marriage, Richard Neville, 5th Earl of Salisbury, retained the Yorkshire estates, including Sheriff Hutton.

Upon the death of Salisbury's son, Richard Neville, 16th Earl of Warwick, in 1471 at the Battle of Barnet, his lands were given to Richard, Duke of Gloucester, brother of Edward IV by right of his wife, Anne Neville. Richard often stayed at the castle during his tenure as Lord of the North. Its proximity to York made it convenient to Richard.

By the middle of October 1480, Richard was at Sheriff Hutton where he received news from the Earl of Northumberland that the Scots might attempt retaliation for the raiding party that Richard had led across the borders. Northumberland wrote to the magistrates of York ordering them to prepare an armed force. The men of York sent an alderman to Richard at Sheriff Hutton seeking his advice.

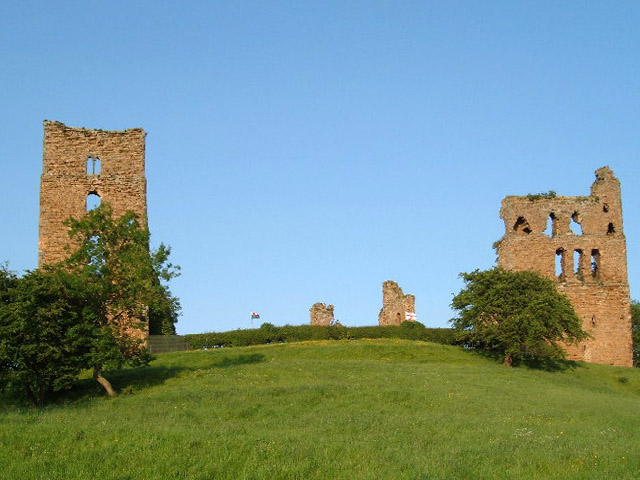
Sheriff Hutton Castle from the west

In 1484, Richard established a royal household for the young Edward, Earl of Warwick, son of George Plantagenet, 1st Duke of Clarence, and John de la Pole, 1st Earl of Lincoln. In July 1484, Richard established the Council of the North, with its chief headquarters at Sheriff Hutton and Sandal Castle. The Council lasted for a century and a half. In 1485, the pretender to the throne, Lambert Simnel, was transferred from the castle to the Tower of London by Henry Tudor.

In 1485, while awaiting the invasion of Henry VII at Nottingham, Richard sent his niece, Elizabeth of York, her sisters, and the Earls of Warwick, Lincoln, Lord Morley and John of Gloucester, to the castle.

After Richard's death at the Battle of Bosworth in 1485, the castle became the property of Henry VII. John Skelton visited the castle in 1495 and wrote a poem "The Garlande of Laurell" about lady Elizabeth Tilney (countess of Surrey, 1st wife of Thomas Howard, Earl of Surrey, later 2nd Duke of Norfolk). The Howards lived in the castle, although it still belonged to the crown, because Thomas Howard, later 2nd Duke of Norfolk was King's Lieutenant in the North from 1489 to 1499 and possibly constable of Sheriff Hutton Castle. In 1499/1500 Sir Thomas Darcy (in 1509 made 1st Baron Darcy) became the castle's constable and steward (replacing Surrey). In 1509 Sir Thomas Darcy was then replaced by Sir Richard Cholmondeley. (Another source claims in 1525 that the castle was where Henry VIII sent Henry Fitzroy to be raised, suggesting it still belonged to the crown.) A survey of this date describes the castle as being in need of repair. In 1536 Sir Henry sold the castle to the Howard family.

In 1537 Thomas Howard, 3rd Duke of Norfolk made repairs to the castle but, following the council's relocation to York in the mid-sixteenth century, the castle went into decline. (Note: The repairs are also recorded as being by his namesake, Thomas Howard, 2nd Duke of Norfolk, but this is impossible as he died in 1524.)

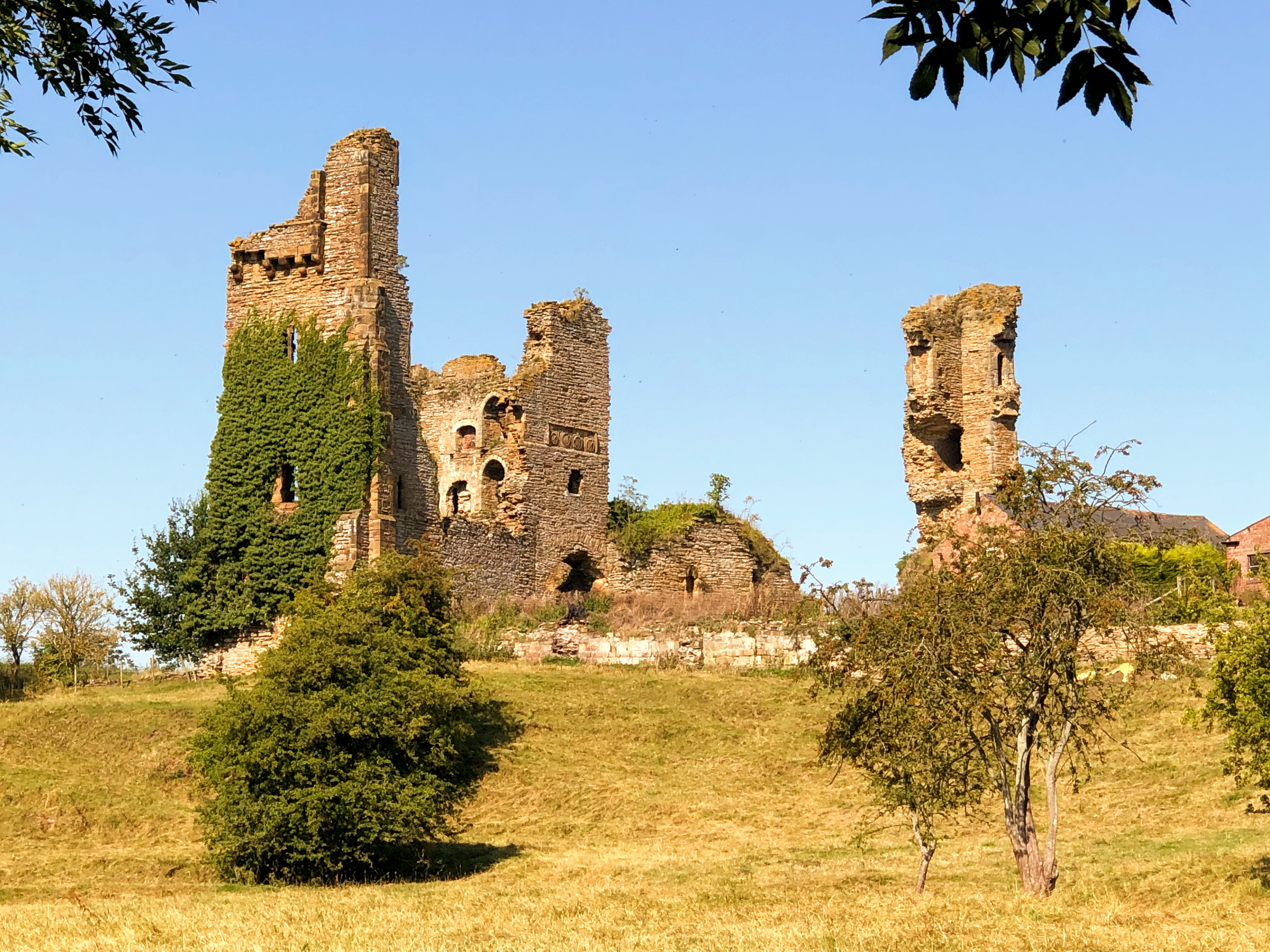
The gatehouse and south-east tower

A further campaign of repairs was undertaken by Henry, Earl of Huntingdon in 1572. The Earl hoped the President of the council would use the castle as a residence, and he described it as an 'olde Castell aamoste ruinated.' In 1618 it was again described as ruinous. The castle was acquired by the Ingram family in 1622, and stone from the site was used for various buildings in Sheriff Hutton village.

The castle remained in the Ingram family until the early twentieth century, by which time the ruins were being used as a farmyard. However, the castle and the adjacent park were leased in the 18th/19th centuries by George Lowther Thompson. It was designated a scheduled ancient monument in the 1950s. The castle is now privately owned, being in the possession of the Howarth family from the 1940s until it was sold in 2019 to another private owner.

== Description ==
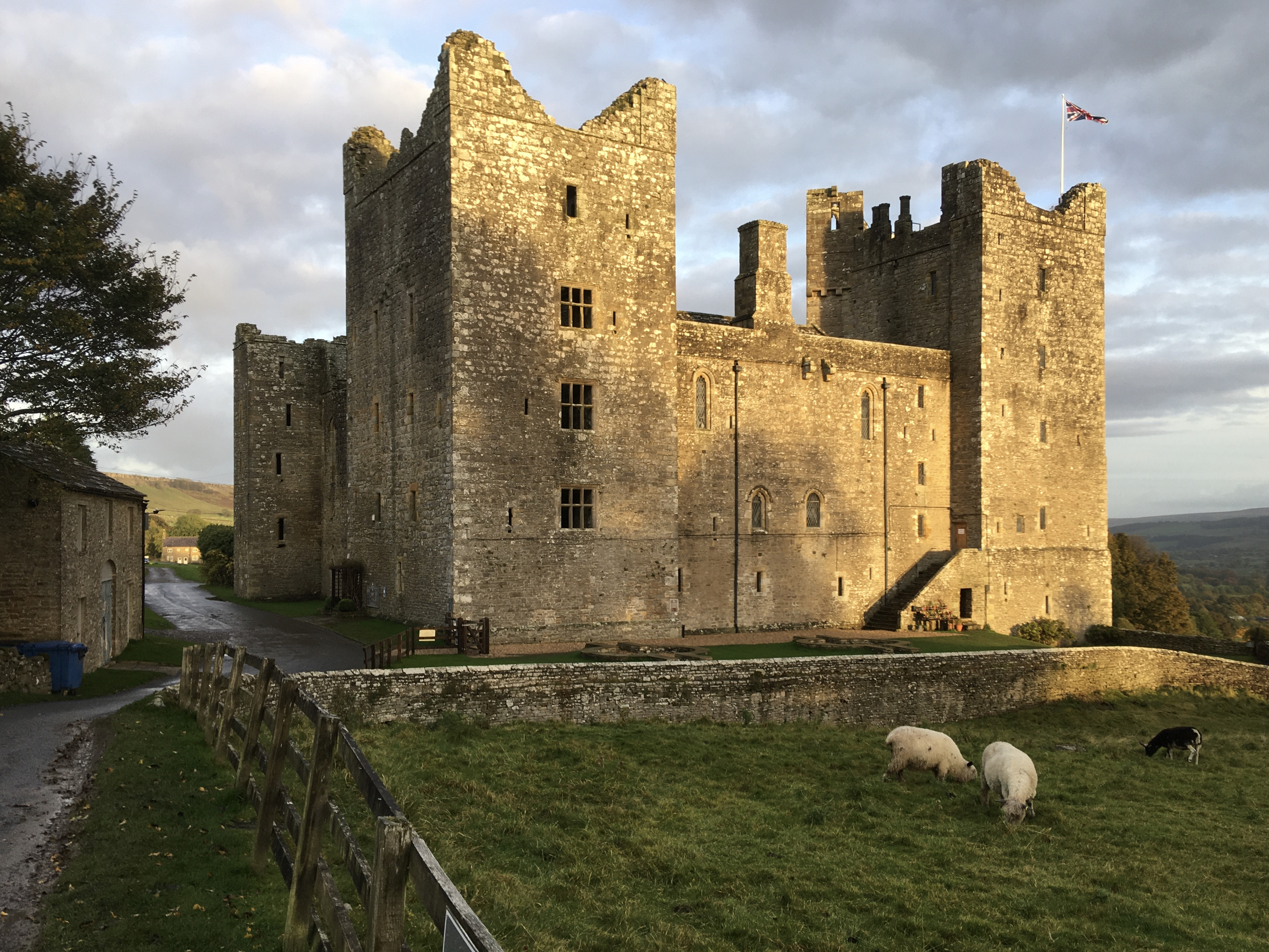
Bolton Castle, Wensleydale. A contemporary building to Sheriff Hutton, probably by the same designer.

Both castle sites lie on the south side of the village, being some 10 miles (16 km) north of York, and 8 miles (13 km) south-east of Easingwold. The castle is irregularly quadrangular in form, with four rectangular corner towers connected by ranges of buildings, enclosing an inner courtyard. The northern and western sides are straight, whereas those on the south and east contain obtuse, outward pointing angles at their centres. The entrance lies in the east wall, protected by a gatehouse. The fabric of the castle was largely rubble mudstone, dressed with sandstone, which was quarried at Terrington.

Tall fragments of the corner towers and gatehouse still stand to their original height, but the ranges of buildings and curtain walls between have now largely gone. A middle and outer ward originally existed, but these are now covered by the adjacent farm. A good impression of how the castle appeared when complete can be gained from the better preserved ruins at Bolton Castle.

The castle is a Grade II* listed building, and recognised as an internationally important structure.

== See also ==
- Grade II* listed buildings in North Yorkshire (district)
- Listed buildings in Sheriff Hutton
