= Farlington, North Yorkshire =

Village and civil parish in North Yorkshire, England

Coordinates: 54.1016°N 1.0608°W

Farlington
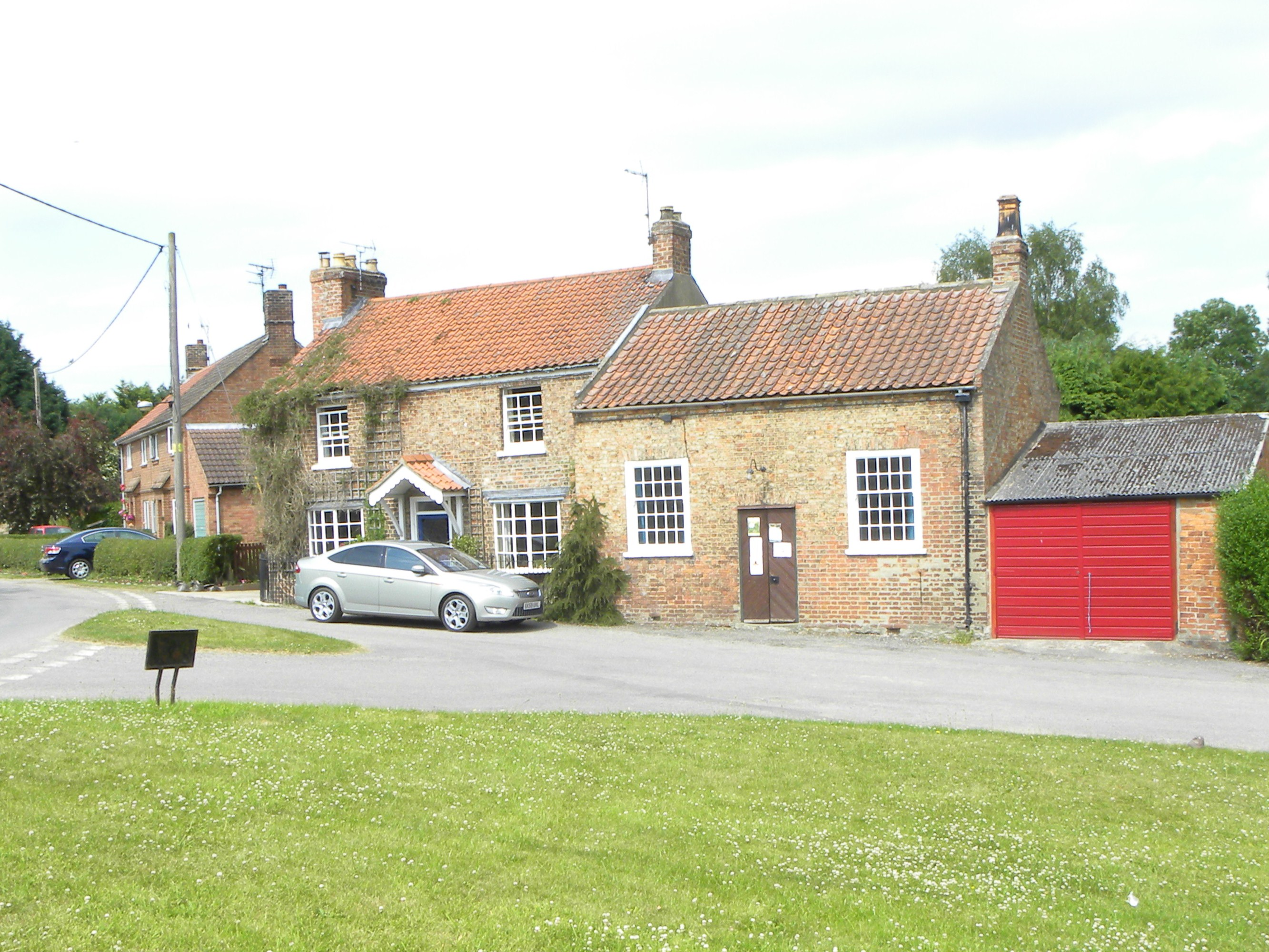
- Farlington, North Yorkshire

- Location within North Yorkshire
- Population: 122 (Including Marton-cum-Moxby. 2011 census)
- OS grid reference: SE615097
- Civil parish: Farlington
- Unitary authority: North Yorkshire
- Ceremonial county: North Yorkshire
- Region: Yorkshire and the Humber
- Country: England
- Sovereign state: United Kingdom
- Post town: YORK
- Postcode district: YO61
- Police: North Yorkshire
- Fire: North Yorkshire
- Ambulance: Yorkshire
- UK Parliament: Thirsk and Malton

Farlington is a small village and civil parish in the county of North Yorkshire, England. It is situated approximately 9.5 miles (15.3 km) north of York between Stillington and Sheriff Hutton. A small stream, the Farlington beck, runs through the village.

== History ==
Farlington is mentioned in the Domesday Book of 1086 as Falinton in the Bulford Hundred. At the time of the Norman Conquest in 1066 the manor was in the name of Ligulf, but passed to Robert, Count of Mortain who made Nigel Fossard the lord of the manor in his stead.

Farlington, as a name, originates before the Domesday Book. Its origins are likely to be Anglo Saxon where the meaning would be the settlement, -ton, of the Feorlings clan.

== Governance ==
The village is within the Thirsk and Malton UK Parliament constituency. From 1974 to 2023 it was part of the Hambleton District, it is now administered by the unitary North Yorkshire Council.

== Geography ==
The village is at an elevation of 123 feet (37 m) above sea level at its highest point. The nearest settlements are Stillington 2 miles (3.2 km) to the west; Sheriff Hutton 2.3 miles (3.7 km) to the east-south-east; Brandsby-cum-Stearsby 2.6 miles (4.2 km) to the north and Sutton-on-the-Forest 2.71 miles (4.36 km) to the south-west. Farlington Beck runs southwards through the village to join the River Foss about a 1 mile (1.6 km) south.

According to the 1881 UK Census, the population was 168. The 2001 UK Census recorded the population as 124, of which 94 were over the age of sixteen. Of those, 64 were in employment. The village contains 47 dwellings of which 34 are detached properties.

== Amenities ==
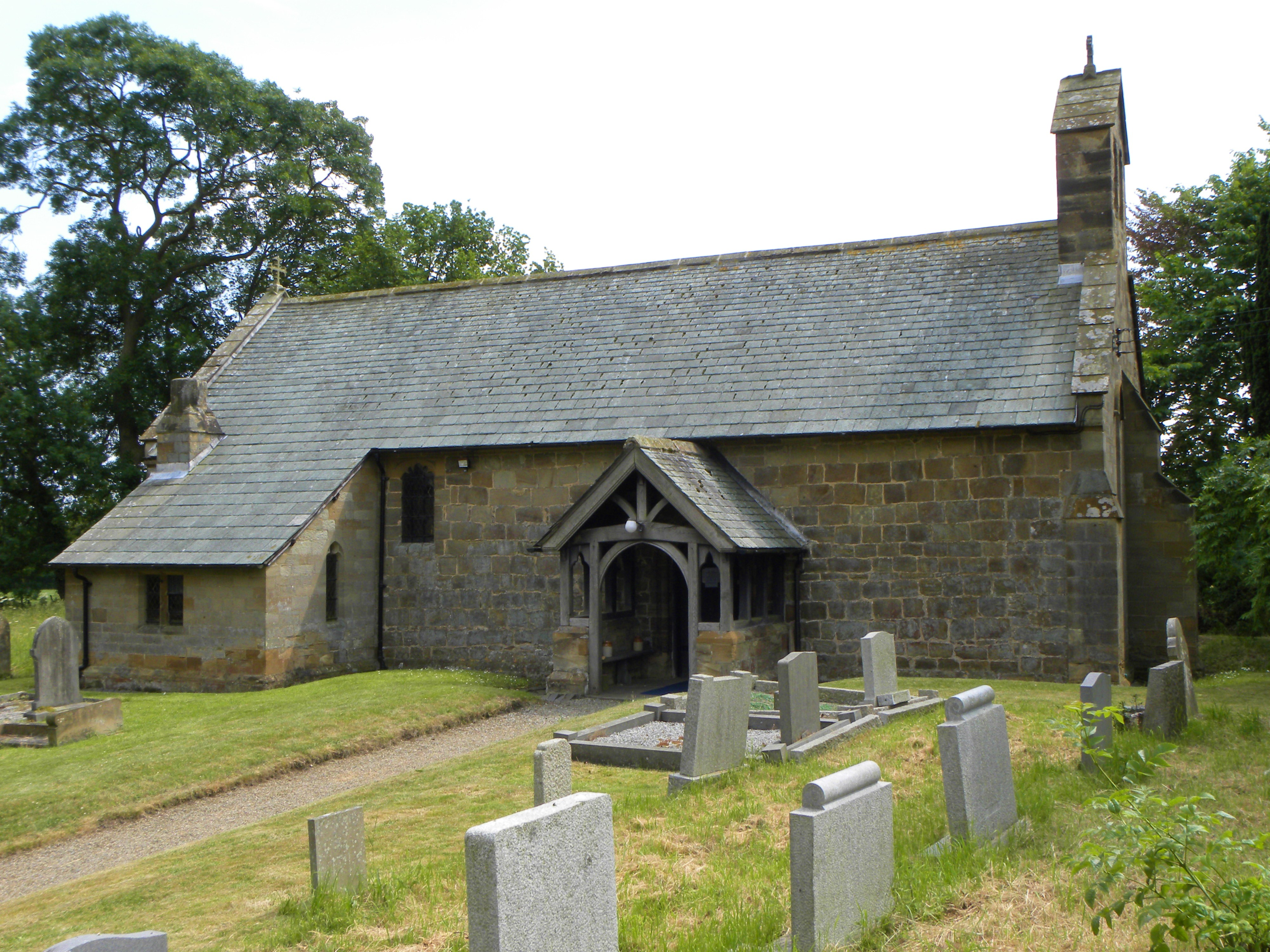
St Leonard’s Church, Farlington, North Yorkshire

The village has a pub, a church, a village hall, a red telephone box and a post box. Primary education is provided at nearby Sheriff Hutton, Stillington and Sutton on the Forest CE Primary Schools. These schools are within the catchment area of Easingwold School for secondary education.

== Religion ==
St Leonard's Church, Farlington, on the outskirts of the village, is substantially a 12th-century structure, only altered by the addition of buttresses and windows of various dates and extensive restoration in the 19th century. It is small rectangular building 50 ft. by 16 ft. (internal measurements), consisting of a nave and chancel without structural division, a vestry north of the chancel and a western bell cote. A Grade II Listed Building, it was partially restored in 1887.

== See also ==
- Listed buildings in Farlington, North Yorkshire
