= Richard Goldthorpe =

16th-century English politician

Richard Goldthorpe (died 16 March 1560 in York) was an English haberdasher, investor, real estate developer and politician from Yorkshire.

He was elected Lord Mayor of York in 1556 and Member of Parliament for York in 1559.

He bought Clementhorpe Priory, together with other estates in the county. In 1560, after his death, his estate was valued at £2460, considerable wealth at the time. He was buried in York Minster.

He had married Anne, the daughter of John Norman, MP of York and the widow of Richard Thornton of York, with whom he had 2 sons and 7 daughters. His daughter Anne was married to Hugh Ingram and had a son Sir Arthur Ingram.
