= Sheriff Hutton =

Village and civil parish in North Yorkshire, England

Coordinates: 54°05′21″N 1°00′18″W

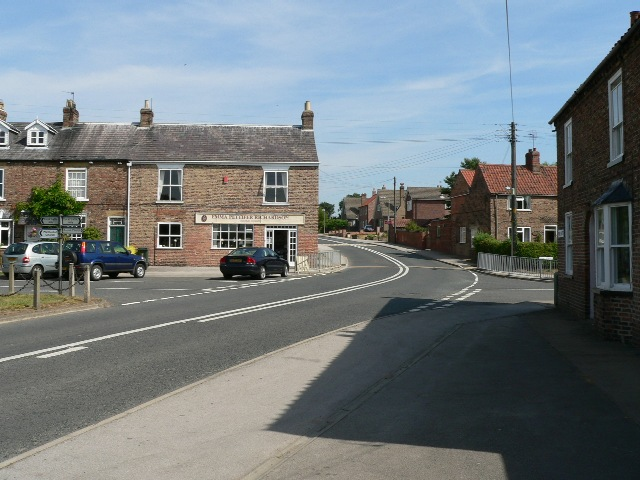
- Finkle Street, Sheriff Hutton

- Location within North Yorkshire
- Population: 1,019 (2011)
- OS grid reference: SE652664
- Unitary authority: North Yorkshire
- Ceremonial county: North Yorkshire
- Region: Yorkshire and the Humber
- Country: England
- Sovereign state: United Kingdom
- Post town: YORK
- Postcode district: YO60
- Dialling code: 01347
- Police: North Yorkshire
- Fire: North Yorkshire
- Ambulance: Yorkshire
- UK Parliament: Thirsk and Malton

Sheriff Hutton is a village and civil parish in North Yorkshire, England. It lies about 10 miles (16 km) north by north-east of York.

== History ==
The village is mentioned twice in the Domesday Book of 1086, as Hotun in the Bulford hundred. Before the Norman Conquest of 1066 the manor was split between several land-owners. Those named included Ligulf, Northmann, Thorkil, Thorsten and Thorulf. Afterwards some of the land was retained by the Crown and other portions given to Count Robert of Mortain who installed Nigel Fossard as lord of the manor. Soon after this, the land was in the possession of the Bulmer family. Bertram de Bulmer built the first castle in the village during the reign of King Stephen. After the civil war between Stephen and Matilda, the castle and manor were seized by the Crown before being held for the king by the Mauley family. The manor eventually came into the possession of the Neville family in the 14th century until 1480, when it was surrendered to the Crown. Various grants of land were made up to the 17th century when possession is recorded as belonging to Sir Thomas Ingram. The Ingram family, by way of various marriages, maintained lordship until 1904, when it passed to Hon. Edward Frederick Lindley Wood.

=== Toponymy ===
The name is derived from the Old English words hoh and tun, together meaning settlement on a projecting piece of land. The prefix of Sheriff is thought to arise because it was once held by Bertram de Bulmer, the Sheriff of York, who died in 1166.

=== Castles ===
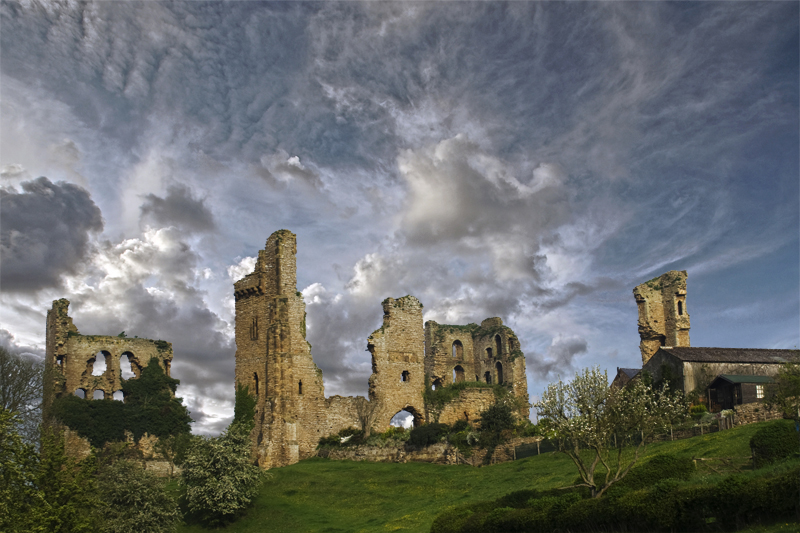
Sheriff Hutton Castle is privately owned

In 1140, during the reign of King Stephen, a motte-and-bailey castle was built here in the Forest of Galtres by Bertram de Bulmer, the remains of which can be seen to the south of the churchyard. Those remains have been designated Ancient Monument status.

The extant remains of the stone Castle at the western end of the village were built by John, Lord Neville in the late fourteenth century. It fell into disrepair during the reign of King James I. It is a Grade II Listed Building.

The Neville Castle was used by Richard III to house his nephew Edward, Earl of Warwick and his niece, Elizabeth of York.

Sheriff Hutton Hall is a Grade I listed building, and was built as a hunting lodge for the Castle and used by James I in 1617. The lodge was remodelled as a country house in about 1619, with further extensions in the 19th century.

== Governance ==
The village lies within the Thirsk and Malton (UK Parliament) constituency. It gives its name to the Sheriff Hutton and Derwent electoral division of North Yorkshire Council in which it sits.

From 1974 to 2023 it was part of the district of Ryedale.

The local Parish Council is made of six members.

An electoral ward in the same name exists. This ward stretches south east to Flaxton with a total population taken at the 2011 Census of 1,729.

== Geography ==
The nearest settlements are West Lilling 0.8 miles (1.3 km) to the south, Thornton-le-Clay 2.2 miles (3.5 km) to the south east and Farlington 2.3 miles (3.7 km) to the north east.

The 2001 UK Census recorded the population as 1,038, of which 842 were over the age of sixteen years. There were 448 dwellings, of which 239 were detached. The population at the 2011 Census was 1019.

== Amenities ==
=== Economy ===
There are a diverse range of small to medium size businesses in and around the village from traditional building and contracting to small IT firms. There are also two public houses. The village is served by the York to Malton bus route via Castle Howard.

=== Sports ===
The Village Hall provides facilities for Badminton as well as other multi-function events. There is a Tennis Club with two hard courts on North Garth Lane. The Bowls Club have a green and clubhouse next to the Cricket Ground. Sheriff Hutton Cricket Club have their pavilion and clubhouse next to the Village Hall grounds.

== Religion ==
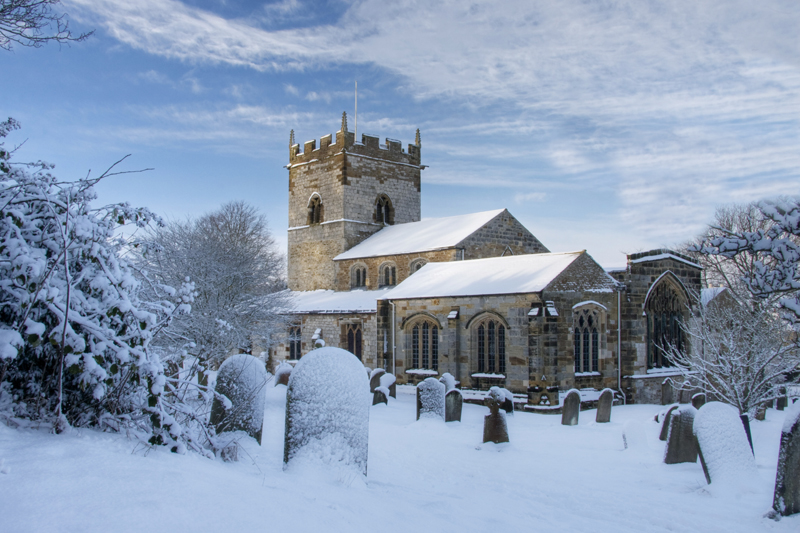
St Helen and the Holy Cross Church, Sheriff Hutton

St Helen and the Holy Cross Church, Sheriff Hutton is the parish church and was built in the early 12th century. It is a Grade I Listed Building. The chancel was added in the 13th century, and there was other rebuilding work carried out in both the 14th and 15th centuries.

An alabaster cenotaph with an effigy of a child was long regarded to depict Edward of Middleham, son of Richard III and Anne Neville, but is now thought to be an earlier work and to depict one of the Neville family.

There is also a Methodist church in the village near the school. Wesleyan and Primitive Methodist chapels were built in the 19th century.

== Education ==
There is a school in the village, Sheriff Hutton Primary School, and is within the catchment area of Easingwold School for secondary education.

The village had a school attached to the early Wesleyan chapel which was built in 1855, but no longer in use. In 1873, the wife of the lord of the manor paid for the building of a National School in the village.

== See also ==
- Listed buildings in Sheriff Hutton
