= Lillings Ambo =

Civil parish in North Yorkshire, England

Coordinates: 54.067°N 1.011°W

- Civil parish
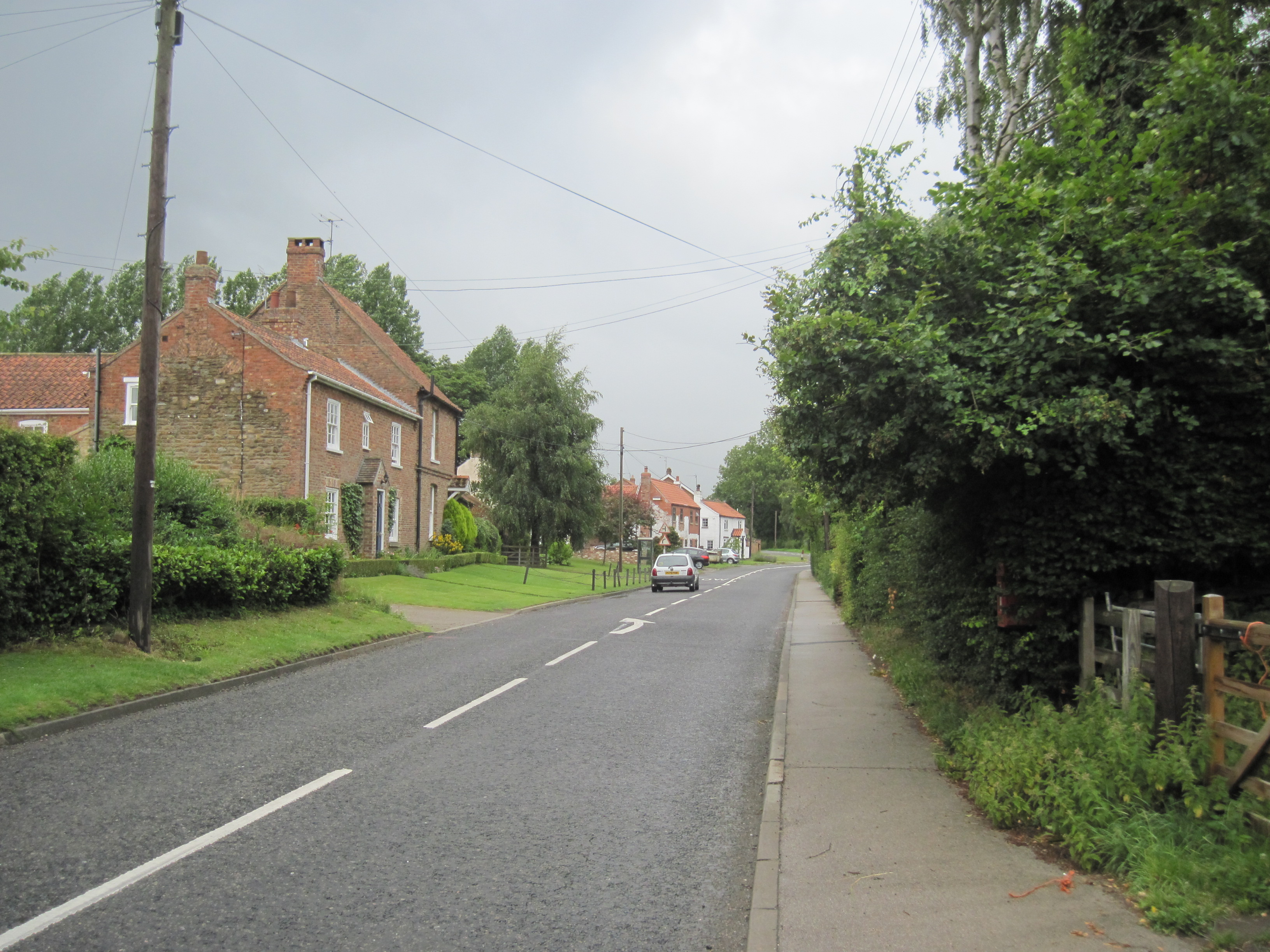
- West Lilling village street

- Location within North Yorkshire
- Population: 150 (2015)
- OS grid reference: SE645638
- Unitary authority: North Yorkshire
- Ceremonial county: North Yorkshire
- Region: Yorkshire and the Humber
- Country: England
- Sovereign state: United Kingdom
- Post town: YORK
- Postcode district: YO60
- Police: North Yorkshire
- Fire: North Yorkshire
- Ambulance: Yorkshire
- UK Parliament: Thirsk and Malton

Lillings Ambo is a civil parish in North Yorkshire, England. It is between the villages of Strensall and Sheriff Hutton, and its southern edge is the border between the unitary authorities of North Yorkshire Council and the City of York Council. The River Foss flows through the parish, and in 2020, a scheme was approved to build a leaky dam to store water in the south of the parish in times of flood.

== History ==
The civil parish has the village of West Lilling, and areas to the south known as Lilling Green. The first part of the name derives from Old English of Lillingas, meaning the place of Lilla's people. The suffix Ambo, also seen in the nearby parish of Huttons Ambo, is a Latin term usually denoting that the parish is made up of two villages sharing a common name: West and East Lilling (or Lillings Both). West and East Lilling were both mentioned in the Domesday Book with East Lilling being recorded as completely depopulated by 1625, though probably, most inhabitants had left by 1485. The fields in the parish, especially those around West Lilling were enclosed by 1769.

The village of West Lilling consists of around 45 buildings, but the old village of East Lilling is now in the civil parish of Sheriff Hutton, although two listed buildings in the Lillings Ambo parish are labelled as East Lilling. The village of West Lilling is some 0.75 miles (1.21 km) south of Sheriff Hutton, and 9 miles (14 km) north of York.

Land within the parish is largely agricultural, with various ponds acting as a good reserve for great crested newts, one of a handful of sites in Ryedale where they still thrive. The River Foss flows through the parish (from west to south-east) and in the 18th century, the river was canalised in an effort to make it navigable to Sheriff Hutton Bridge (which despite its name, is in the parish of Lillings Ambo). The meandering of the river before it was canalised, allowed for it to be forded in several places in the parish. In 2020, a leaky dam water storage project was approved for 151 acres (61 ha) of land surrounding the river in the south of the parish. The scheme would see a 1.03-mile (1.65 km) long bund being built with a concrete substructure which would trap the floodwater, and release it slowly at a rate of 350 cubic feet per second (10 m^{3}/s). The scheme is designed to protect almost 500 properties downstream, with work due to be finished by September 2023.

The long-distance walks, the Centenary Way, the Ebor Way, and the Foss Walk, all pass through the Lillings Ambo. The nearest railway station used to be at Flaxton on the York to Scarborough line, however this closed in 1930, and the nearest railway station is now in York.

== Local authority ==
Lillings Ambo was a township in the ecclesiastical parish of Sheriff Hutton in the 19th century, which itself, was part of the wapentake of Bulmer. The population in the late 1830s was recorded as 197. It was additionally within one of the York poor law unions (Flaxton District), and was created as civil parish in 1866, later coming under the Flaxton Rural District.

Between 1974 and 2023 the parish was part of the Ryedale district. It is now administered by North Yorkshire Council and is part of the Sheriff Hutton & Derwent ward for electoral purposes.

The southern edge of the parish, shares a border with the City of York Unitary Authority boundary.

In 2001 the population of the parish was 147, which had risen to 158 at the 2011 census. In 2015, North Yorkshire County Council estimated the population to be 150.

== See also ==
- Listed buildings in Lillings Ambo
