= James Birkby =

Member of the Parliament of England

Member of the England Parliament for York
- Incumbent
- Assumed office 1593
- Preceded by: Robert Askewith; William Robinson
- Succeeded by: James Birkby; Andrew Trewe
- Incumbent
- Assumed office 1597
- Preceded by: James Birkby; Andrew Trewe
- Succeeded by: Sir John Bennett; Henry Hall

Personal details
- Born: c. 1557
- Died: 1610
- Spouse(s): Beatrix Copley; Elizabeth Lowe
- Children: Alvery; Jane; Alice
- Parent(s): James and Alyce Birkby

James Birkby was one of two Members of the Parliament of England for the constituency of York for two successive parliaments from 1593 to 1597 and 1597–1601.

== Life and politics ==
James was born in about 1557, the eldest son of James Birkby, clerk to the Sherriff of York. He was married twice. Firstly to Beatrix, daughter of John Copley from Batley and of Margaret, who was herself the daughter of Sir Bryan Stapleton of Wighill. They had one son, Alvery, and two daughters, Jane and Alice. His second wife was Elizabeth, the daughter of Sir Thomas Lowe, a London alderman.

James was a lawyer and followed his father to be Sherriff of York between 1571 and 1572. He served as an alderman in 1585 and was Lord Mayor from 1588 to 1589. During his time as MP, he was also Chief Clerk to the York Courts of Law between 1596 and 1597. He was returned as MP for York in 1593 and again in 1597. In 1593, the city of York elections were a two-stage process. In the first stage, member of the common chamber of the council and 50 freeholders cast votes and the top four contenders would progress to a second ballot. This ballot was conducted by the Lord Mayor and the aldermen and the top two would be returned as MPs. James received 32 and 16 votes respectively. In 1597 this process was reduced to a single ballot whereby all of those in both the commons and assembly of York would cast two votes. The two contenders with the most votes were returned as MP. James received the most votes, 35.

James died in 1610 having acquired 550 acres of property in West Yorkshire. In his will, executed by his son, he left monies to his eldest daughter and to the children of his younger daughter, Alice. He also left money to the poor of the city and two children who were in his care.

Political offices
Preceded by Robert Askewith; William Robinson	Member of Parliament; 1593–1597	Next: James Birkby; Andrew Trewe
Preceded by James Birkby; Andrew Trewe	Member of Parliament; 1597–1603	Next: Sir John Bennet; Henry Hall
