= Robert Askwith =

English Member of Parliament

Sir Robert Askwith (a.k.a. Ayscough)

Member of the England Parliament for York
- In office 1604–1614
- Preceded by: Sir John Bennett; Henry Hall
- In office 1614–1621
- In office 1621–1623
- Succeeded by: Sir Arthur Ingram; Christopher Brooke

Personal details
- Born: 1567 York
- Died: 28 September 1623 (aged 55–56)
- Spouse: Mary
- Parent(s): Robert Askwith; Elizabeth Cartmel

Robert Askwith (or Ayscough) (1567–1623) was one of two Members of the Parliament of England for the constituency of York from 1603 to 1623.

== Life and politics ==
Robert was born in 1567 to Robert Askwith, a draper, and Elizabeth Cartmel, the daughter of a barber. His father had been Lord Mayor of the city of York twice (1580 and 1593) as well as MP in 1588. In 1608 he married Mary. He was knighted by King James I on 13 August 1617.

Robert held many offices in the city of York. He became a freeman in 1588 and Chamberlain in 1591 to 1592. He was a councilman between 1595 and 1599 and Sherriff the year after. In 1602 he became an alderman. During his time as MP he acted as commissioner for surveying the River Ouse (1604 and 1610); commissioner for subsidies in 1608 and 1621; collector for Privy Seals loans (1611 to 1612); commissioner to hold courts on the Northern Circuit in 1618. He was Lord Mayor of York in 1606 to 1607 and 1617 to 1618.

He was returned as MP for York in 1604 after he was unsuccessful in becoming Lord Mayor. He would serve in three consecutive Parliaments with Christopher Brooke. His parliamentary record showed he did not speak often in the Commons, but was an active lobbyist in the realms of the areas for which he acted on the various commissions.

Political offices
Preceded by Sir John Bennett; Henry Hall	Member of Parliament; 1603-1623	Next: Sir Arthur Ingram; Christopher Brooke
