= R. Brognard Okie =

American architect (1875–1945)

- Born: June 26, 1875; Camden, New Jersey, U.S.
- Died: 27 December 1945 (aged 70); West Chester, Pennsylvania, U.S.
- Education: University of Pennsylvania
- Occupation: Architect
- Years active: 1898-1945

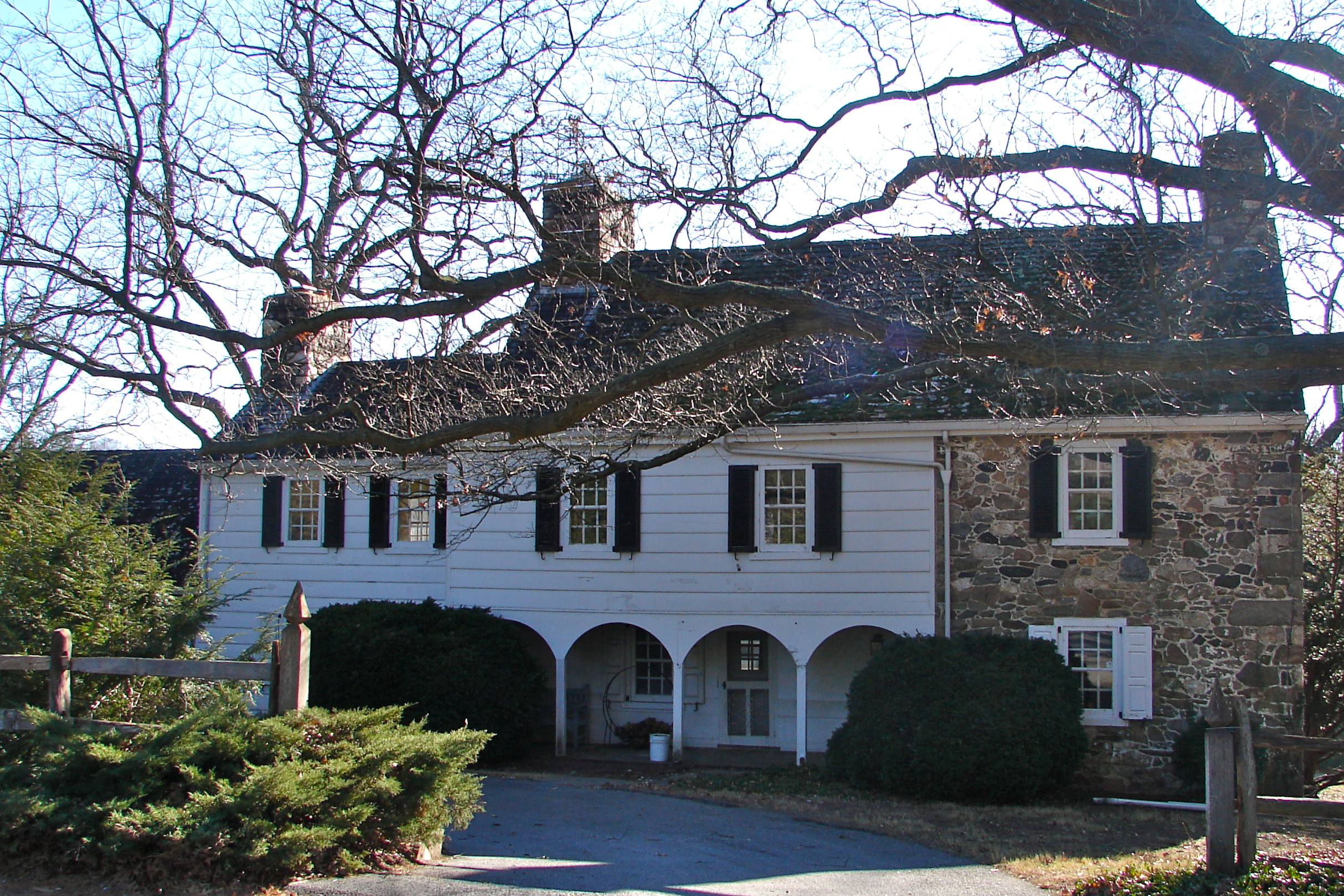
Merestone in New Garden Township, Pennsylvania, built in 1942, is an example of Okie's popular Pennsylvania-farmhouse style.

Richardson Brognard Okie Jr. (1875–1945) was an American architect. He is noted for his Colonial-Revival houses and his sensitive restorations of historic buildings.

== Biography ==
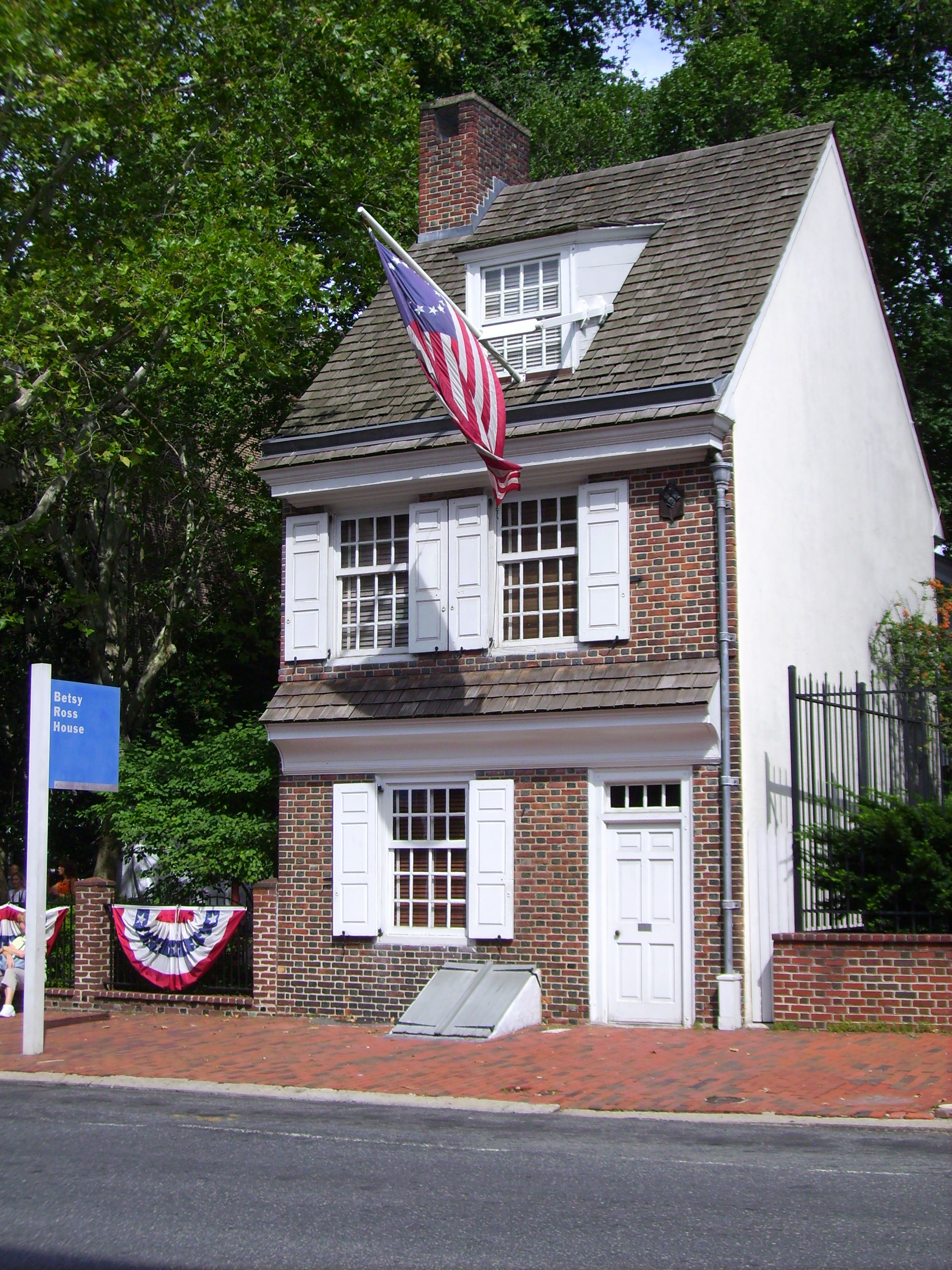
Betsy Ross House in Philadelphia was restored by Okie between 1937 and 1941.

Okie was born in Camden, New Jersey, to Dr. Richardson B. and Clara Mickle Okie. He grew up in Chester County, Pennsylvania, graduated from the architecture program at the University of Pennsylvania in 1897, and briefly studied in Europe. He gained practical experience from a summer (1896) spent with William L. Price. After college he was employed by Arthur S. Cochran and soon became his associate. In 1899, he formed a partnership with architects H. Louis Duhring Jr. and Carl Ziegler, that lasted until 1918. He practiced independently until his death in 1945. In his later years he was joined by his son Charles T. Okie (1915 - 1996).

He designed a re-creation of George Washington's "President's House" as an attraction at the 1926 Sesquicentennial Exposition in Philadelphia; a re-creation of Pennsbury Manor, William Penn's manor house on the Delaware River, as a museum for the Commonwealth of Pennsylvania; and restored the Betsy Ross House in Philadelphia as a museum. He also designed dozens of exquisitely detailed Colonial-Revival houses in the suburbs surrounding Philadelphia. He bought his own house, "Hillside" in Radnor, Pennsylvania, in 1901, and tinkered with it periodically. It remains in his family's possession.

A number of his works are listed on the U.S. National Register of Historic Places. Okie's papers are held by the Pennsylvania Historical and Museum Commission in Harrisburg, Pennsylvania.

== Selected works ==
- Alterations to Bolingbroke Mansion, King of Prussia Road, Radnor, Pennsylvania (1901 and 1908). Now the rectory of St. Martin's Episcopal Church.
- Overfields (Joseph W. Sharp Jr., house), Sugartown Road, Berwyn, Pennsylvania (1902).
- Addition to Pine Forge Mansion, Pine Forge Road and Douglass Drive, Pine Forge, Douglass Township, Berks County, Pennsylvania (1919), NRHP-listed.
- Appleford, 770 Mount Moro Road, Villanova, Pennsylvania (1920s).
- Re-creation of The President's House, Sesquicentennial Fairgrounds, Philadelphia (1925–26, demolished). Headquarters for the Daughters of the American Revolution during the 1926 World's Fair.
- Squirrel Run (S. Hallock duPont residence), 9 Barley Mill Road, Wilmington, Delaware (1926–27).
- Restoration of Roughwood, 107 Old Lancaster Road, Devon, Pennsylvania (1928–30), NRHP-listed.
- Additions to Hillside, King of Prussia Road, Radnor, Pennsylvania (1929). Okie's own house.
- Restoration of Paxton Church, Sharon Street, Paxtang, Pennsylvania (1930).
- Library addition to Buena Vista, 661 South Dupont Highway, Saint Georges, Delaware (1932), NRHP-listed.
- Alterations to Mansion House, Reading Furnace Historic District, Mansion Rd., Warwick Township, Pennsylvania (1936), NRHP-listed.
- Re-creation of Pennsbury Manor, Falls Township, Bucks County, Pennsylvania (1936–39), NRHP-listed.
- Restoration of Betsy Ross House, 239 Arch Street, Philadelphia (1937–41).
- Commissioned to design the Hopeman Estate Home in Waynesboro, Virginia for Mr. A.A. Hopeman Jr.
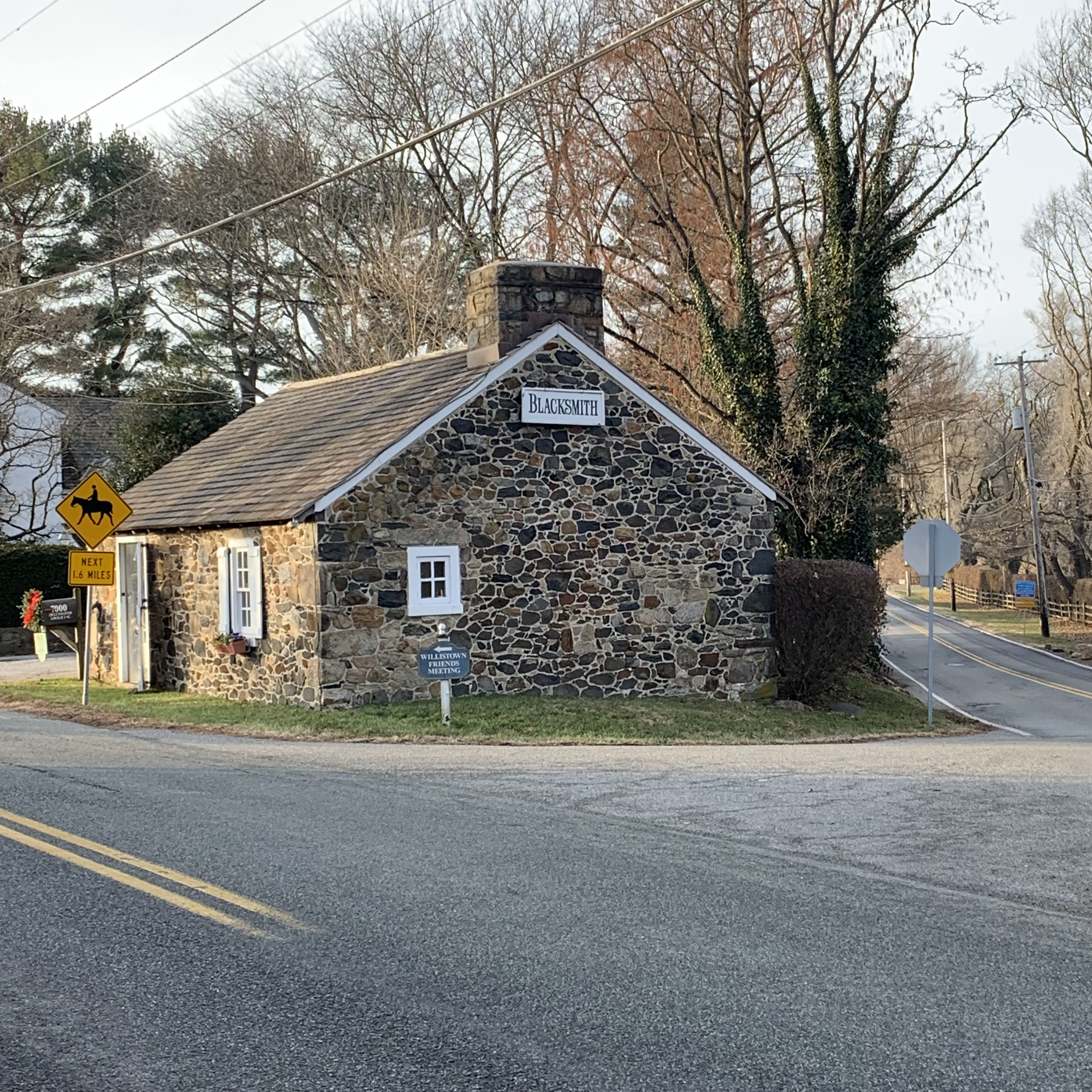
- Building at the junction of Goshen and Providence Roads in Willistown Township designed by R. Brognard and his son, Charles.
  Additions to South Brook Farm, Street and Bird Roads, East Marlborough Township, Chester County, Pennsylvania (1940), NRHP-listed. Now the New Bolton Center of the University of Pennsylvania School of Veterinary Medicine.
- Restoration of St. Peter's Church in the Great Valley, St. Peter's Road, East Whiteland Township, Chester County, Pennsylvania (1940s), NRHP-listed.
- Addition of gallery to Church of the Evangel, 18th and Tasker Streets, Philadelphia.
- Merestone, Yeatman's Station Rd., New Garden Township, Pennsylvania (1942), NRHP-listed. The 3-acre property straddles the border between Pennsylvania and Delaware.
- White Horse Historic District, Goshen and Providence Roads, Willistown Township, Pennsylvania, NRHP-listed.
- The Moore-Irwin House in King of Prussia. Okie twice provided additions and restoration for owner Alexander D. Irwin in the 1930s, '40's. The estate was formerly General Peter Muhlenberg's Headquarters' during the Revolutionary War Winter Encampment at Valley Forge, and is where George Washington wrote in his diary of lodging and fishing during a break in the Constitutional Convention, while also meeting there with two other Founding Fathers, Gouverneur Morris and Robert Morris.
  - Addition to Abraham Hall House, 7005 Goshen Road (1930s). A later addition is attributed to Charles Okie.
  - Restoration of White Horse Inn, 6154 Goshen Road (c. 1940). The stone building was moved about 100-feet back from the highway.
  - Restoration of Mary Yarnall House, 7002 Goshen Road (1940s). Charles Okie designed the garage, c. 1950.
  - Restoration of Charles Mendenhall House, 7004 Goshen Road (1940s). Charles Okie designed the garage, c. 1950.
  - Restoration of Caleb Yarnall House, 7008 Goshen Road (1949). Charles Okie.

== Gallery ==
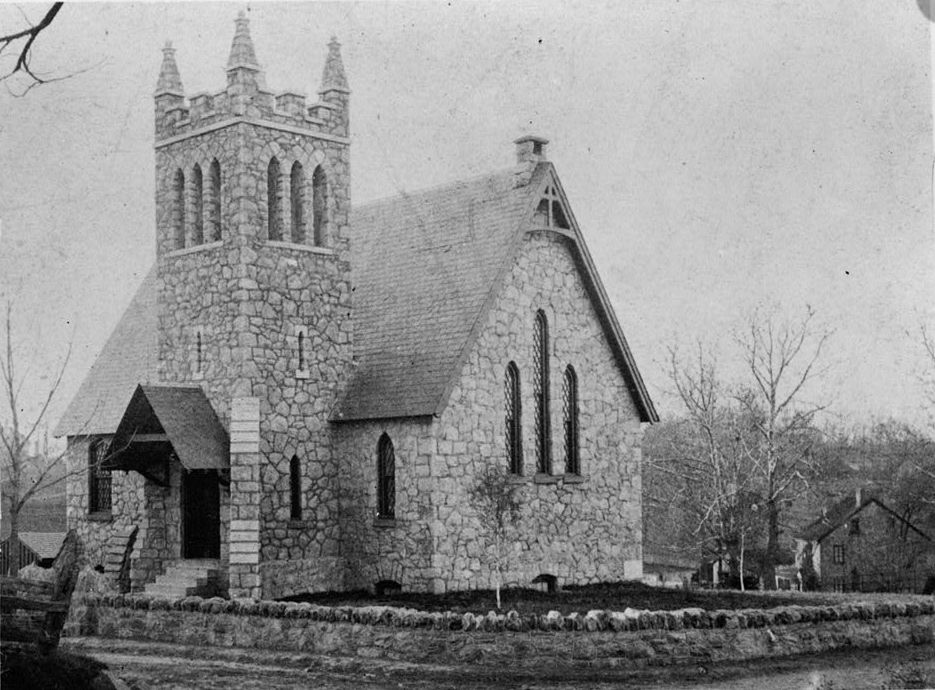
St. Martin's Episcopal Church, Radnor, Pennsylvania. Bolingbroke (background, right) was restored by Okie.

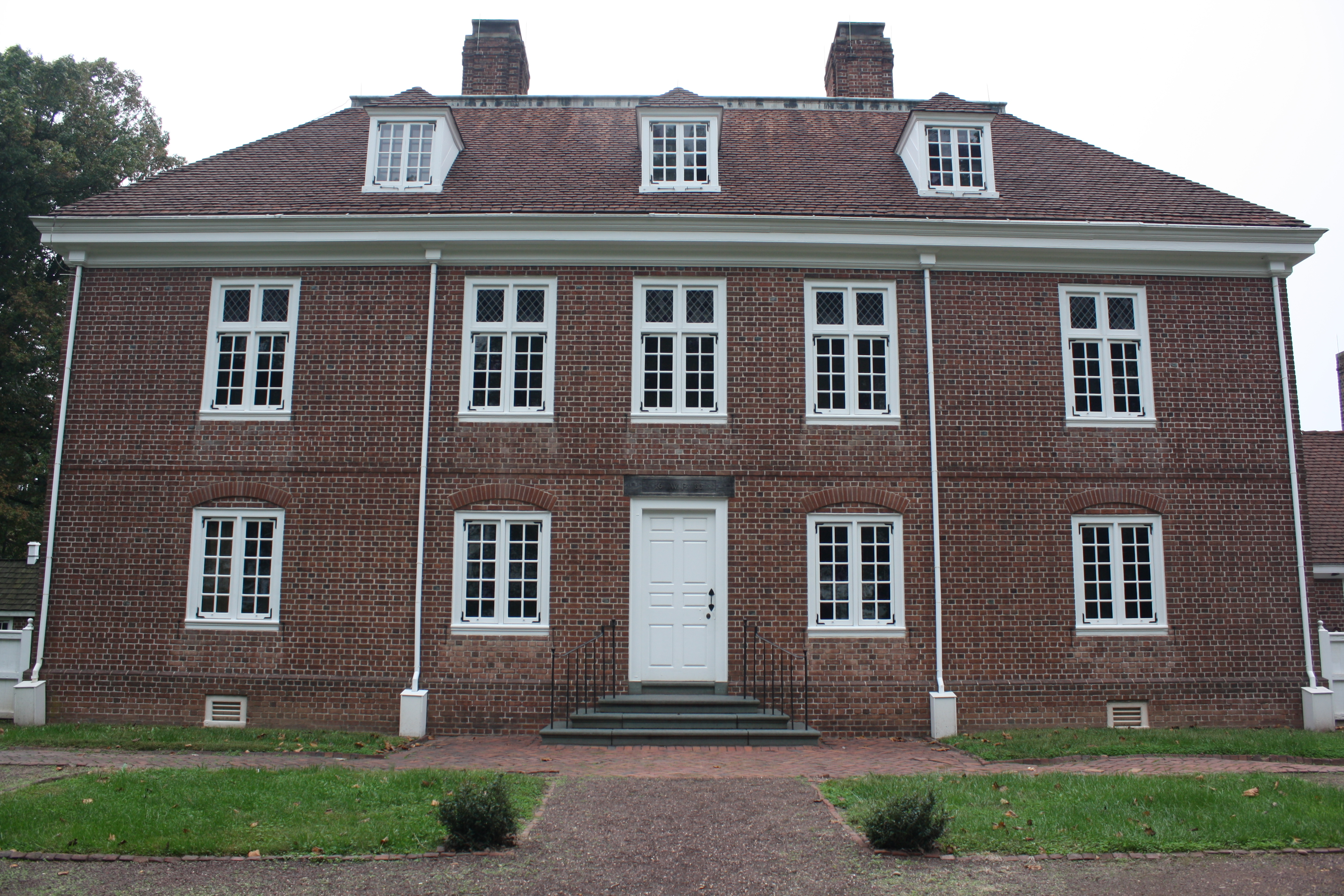
Pennsbury Manor, Falls Township, Pennsylvania (re-created 1936–39).

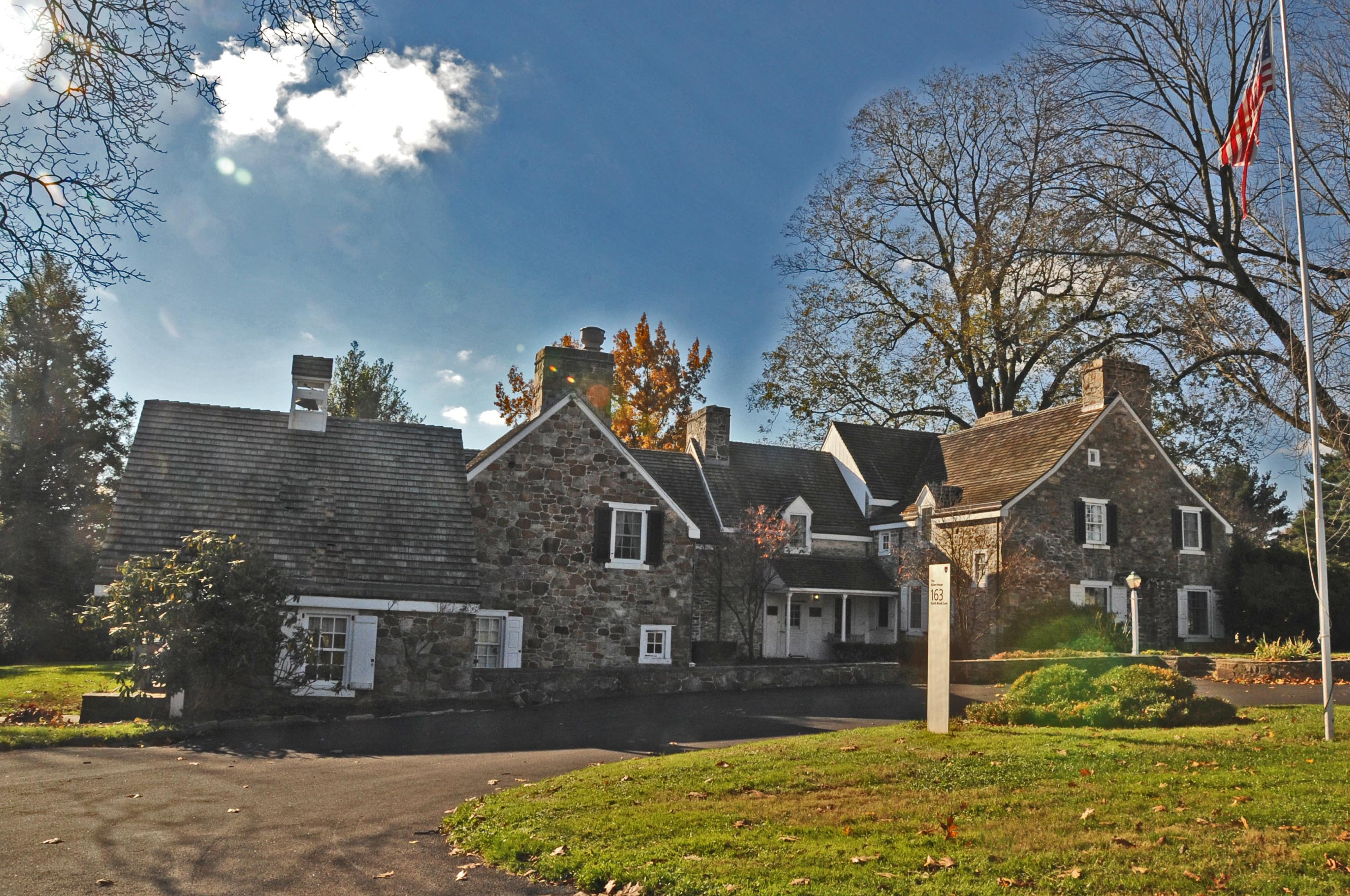
South Brook Farm, East Marlborough Township, Pennsylvania (restored 1940).
