= Nicholas Clarevaux =

13th-century member of parliament

Member of the England Parliament for York
- In office 1297–1297

Personal details
- Born: Unknown Croft-on-Tees
- Died: Unknown Unknown
- Resting place: Unknown
- Relations: Sir Thomas, Simon, John, William, Peter, Robert (brothers)
- Children: Ellen, Peter, John
- Parent(s): Robert de Clarevaux & Eva Fairfax

Nicholas Clarevaux was one of two Members of Parliament for the constituency of York along with John le Espicer in the first Parliament of 1297.

== Life and politics ==
Nicholas, the son of Robert de Clarevaux (Clervaux), and his mother Eva was the daughter of William Fairfax, a Bailiff of the city of York, was born in Croft-on-Tees. His brother Simon was rector of Bulmer. He also had five other brothers, Sir Thomas, John, William, Peter and Robert.

He was elected to Parliament in 1297 on 25 May.

Political offices
Preceded by Nicholas de Selby/Roger Basy	Member of Parliament; 1297	Next: John le Sezevaux/Gilbert de Arnald
