= Bolingbroke =

Bolingbroke may refer to:

== People ==
- Henry IV of England (1367–1413), also known as Henry of Bolingbroke
- Henry St John, 1st Viscount Bolingbroke (1678–1751), Tory party Jacobite grandee and British statesman
- Other Lords Bolingbroke, bearing the titles:
  - Earl of Bolingbroke
  - Viscount Bolingbroke
- Lucy of Bolingbroke (died c. 1138), Anglo-Norman heiress in central England, later in life countess of Chester
- Roger Bolingbroke (died 1441), English cleric, astronomer, astrologer, magister and alleged necromancer
- Andrew de Bolingbroke, Member of Parliament for the constituency of York, 1299 to 1304

== Places ==
=== Canada ===
- Bolingbroke, Nova Scotia, fictional birthplace of Anne Shirley of the Anne of Green Gables series of books by L. M. Montgomery
- Bolingbroke, Ontario, a community in Lanark County, Ontario, Canada

=== England ===
- Bolingbroke, Lincolnshire, Old Bolingbroke
  - Bolingbroke Castle, Old Bolingbroke
- New Bolingbroke, Lincolnshire, a different village

=== United States ===
- Bolingbroke, Georgia, an unincorporated community
- Bolingbroke Mansion, a party house in Radnor, Pennsylvania
- Bolingbroke Penitentiary, a fictional prison in Grand Theft Auto V

== Other uses ==
- Bristol Bolingbroke, a maritime patrol aircraft and trainer used by the Royal Canadian Air Force during World War II
- Bolingbroke, an American national speed record setting Thoroughbred racehorse
