= Moore-Irwin House =

House in King of Prussia, Pennsylvania, US

Coordinates: 40°05′55″N 75°24′37″W

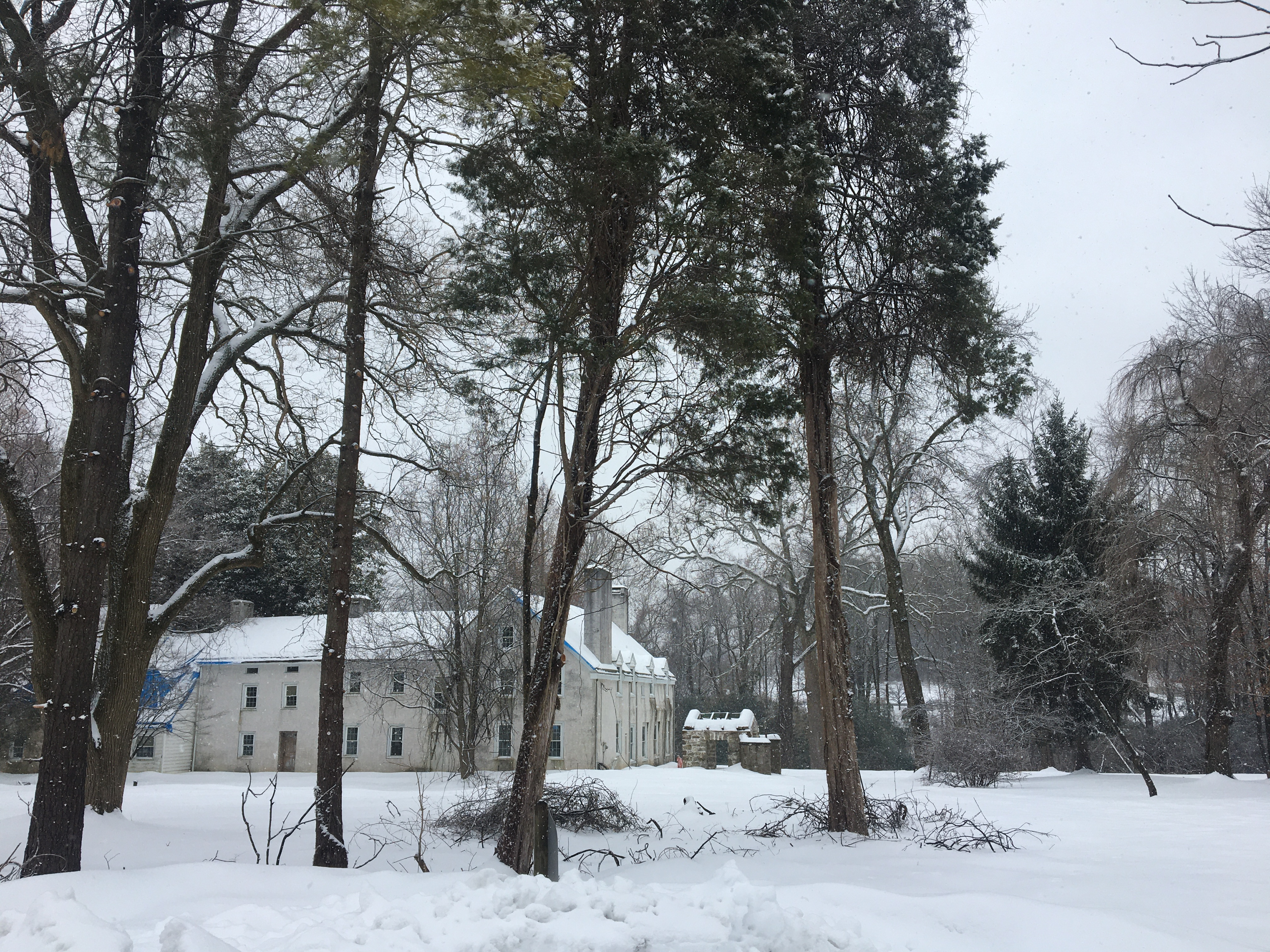
The Moore-Irwin House

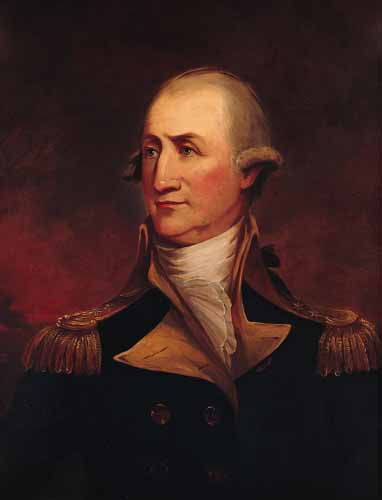
General Peter Muhlenberg

The Moore-Irwin House in King of Prussia, Pennsylvania, US is the estate previously owned by John and Jane Moore, which they loaned to General George Washington's Continental Army for the 1777–1778 winter encampment at Valley Forge during the Revolutionary War. Washington designated it as General Peter Muhlenberg's headquarters throughout the encampment, and Washington also returned to stay there during a rare break in the 1787 Constitutional Convention. Washington lodged here during his two-day fishing trip and tour of the former encampment site, and met there with two other Founding Fathers, Gouverneur Morris (the "Penman of the Constitution") and Robert Morris (the “Financier of the American Revolution”) before returning to Philadelphia on August 1, 1787, six days prior to the first draft of the United States Constitution being presented to the other Founding Fathers.

The estate is owned by Upper Merion Township, and sits a half mile outside Valley Forge National Historical Park.

The property and home are also significant for many reasons over centuries. While prominent architect Alexander D. Irwin, founder of Irwin-Leighton Construction, owned the property in the early to mid-1900's he partnered (twice) with renowned architect Richardson Brognard Okie, known as a leader in the Colonial Revival style, and his restoration of other significant and historical properties such as The President's House, the Betsy Ross House, and Pennsbury Manor, the country estate of William Penn, to preserve and enhance the Moore-Irwin home. The surrounding 4.8 acres of the Moore-Irwin House are also home to a level one arboretum, the Silas T. Burgess Arboretum, which has ten historic trees listed as Champion Trees of Pennsylvania.

In years prior to "Winter Quarters Farm" owner A.D. Irwin selling the remaining property to Upper Merion, he sold several parcels for use as the King of Prussia Business Park (now the KoP District, partially known as Moore Park), the Pennsylvania Turnpike Interchange (adjacent to the King of Prussia Mall, formerly The King of Prussia Plaza & Court, and the original King of Prussia Inn, which all helped enable King of Prussia, Montgomery County and surrounding regions to become a large hub of people, communities, innovation, commerce, traffic, tourism and history.

Upon Upper Merion Township acquiring the final 4.8 acre parcel and home in 1972, they initially used it as the Upper Merion Cultural Center / Park and Recreation Headquarters, which hosted the first "Concert Under the Stars", was home to the five-county area school leaf collections, painting, nature projects, field trips, sleepovers, fishing (Trout Creek), hiking, Halloween trails, science and art shows, plays, cultural, historical and community events. The house has been assigned a Determination of Eligibility (DOE) by the Pennsylvania Historical and Museum Commission, for listing on the National Register of Historical Places.

== History ==
=== 1700s–1800s: The Moore Family ===
The property once owned by William Penn, and then his daughter Letitia Penn, was subsequently passed to David Powell and then John Moore(I) who purchased 400 acres from Powell in 1709, including the land upon which the Moore-Irwin House sits today. In 1760, 20 years after John(I) Moore's death, the property was divided between his sons, John(II) and Mordecai. It is thought that Mordecai Moore inherited the family home, while John(II) Moore inherited a larger share of the land and then built his own house on it, which is the location of today's Moore-Irwin House.

John(II) Moore married Jane, and during the winter encampment of the Continental Army at Valley Forge in 1777–1778, the couple's home served as General Peter Muhlenberg's quarters. John died in 1778 and the property was divided again between his two sons, John(III) and Richard Moore, while Jane Moore remained in the home, living with her younger son, Richard, who was still unmarried. In 1787 Jane Moore was visited by George Washington, Gouverneur Morris, and Robert Morris in the midst of the Constitutional Convention. Washington described the visit in his diary and his correspondence.

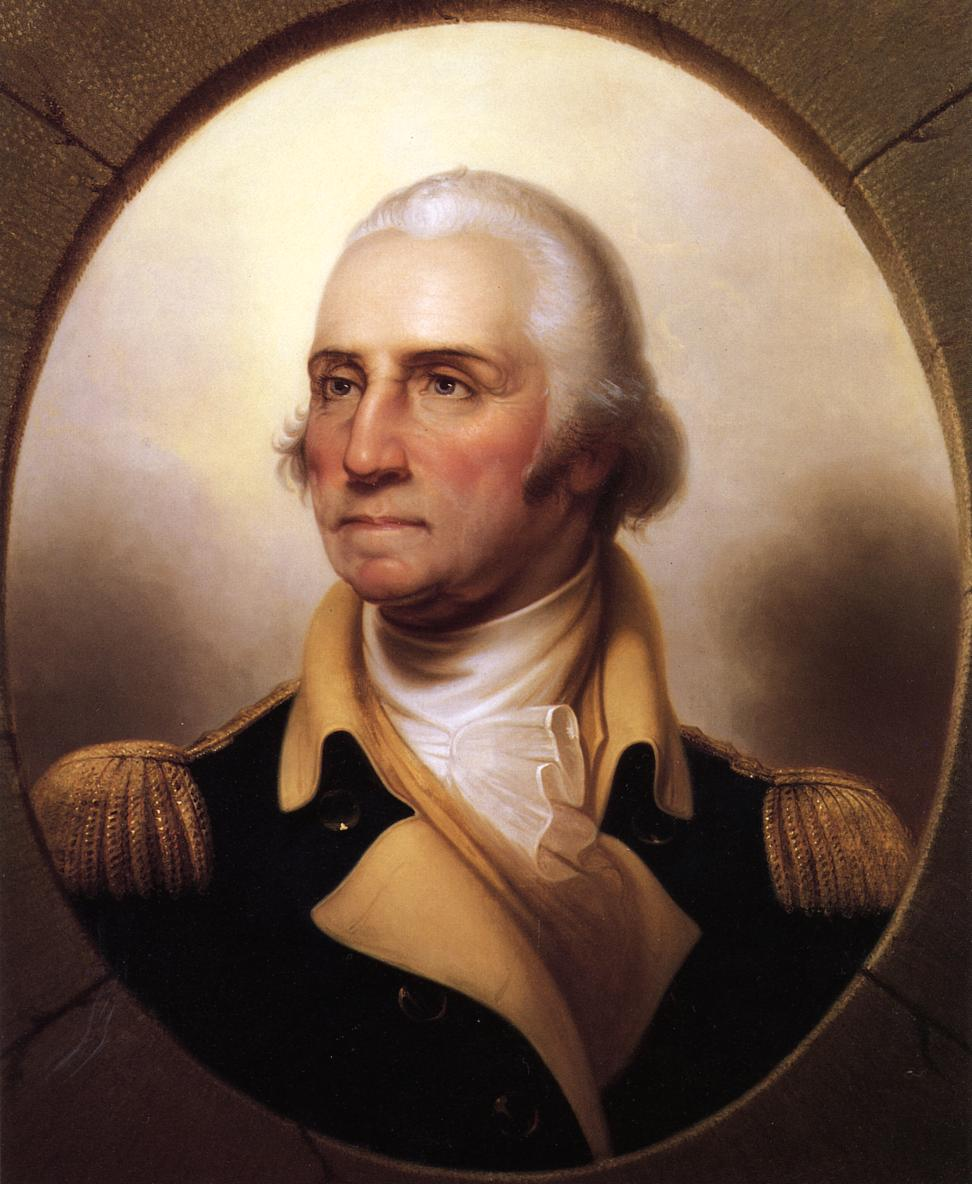
General George Washington

An excerpt from Washington's diary, dated July 30, 1787, reads: Monday. 30th. In company with Mr. Govr. Morris, and in his Phaeton with my horses; went up to one Jane Moores in the vicinity of Valley-forge to get Trout.

In a note to close friend and confidant Mrs. Elizabeth Powel, Washington wrote:

Genl. Washington presents his respectful compliments to Mrs. Powel, and would, with great pleasure, have made one of a party for the School for Scandal this evening; had not everything been arranged, & Mr. Govr. Morris and himself on the point of stepping into the Carriage for a fishing expedition at Jenny Moores; at Which place Mr. & Mrs. Robt. Morris are to be tomorrow, to partake of the successes, of Mr. Govr. Morris & himself this day. The Genl. can but regret that matters have turned out so unluckily, after waiting so long to receive a lesson in the School for Scandal.

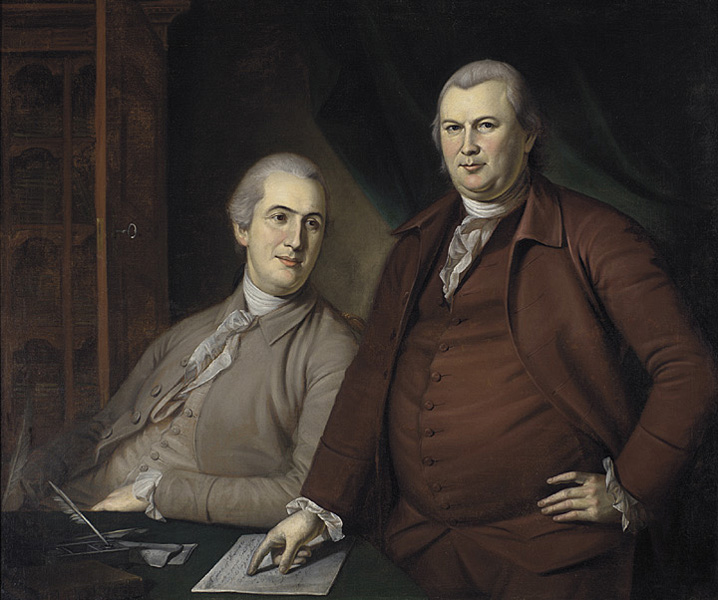
Robert Morris "The Financier of the Revolution", and Gouverneur Morris "The Penman of the Constitution"

An excerpt from Washington's diary, dated July 31, 1787, reads: Tuesday 31st. Whilst Mr. Morris was fishing I rid over the old Cantonment of the American [army] of the Winter 1777, & Visited all the Works, wch. were in Ruins; and the Incampments in woods where the ground had not been cultivated. On my return to Mrs. Moores I found Mr. Robt. Morris & his lady there.

An excerpt from Washington's diary, dated August 1, 1787, reads: Wednesday 1st. About 11 oclock, after it had ceased raining, we all set out for the City and dined at Mr. Morris's.

An excerpt from the U.S. National Park Service (NPS), Independence National Historical Park Articles "The Constitutional Convention: A Day by Day Account for August 1, 1787 Having concluded a fishing expedition in Valley Forge, Washington (VA) returned to Philadelphia after 11:00 a.m. when the rain stopped. He later dined at Robert Morris's (PA).

While architectural experts have slight differences of opinion on which specific portions of today's still standing Moore-Irwin House are from the original 1777-1778 house that served as Muhlenberg's Headquarters, vs the 1787, 1798 or 1810 versions of the home, it is clear this is the location of the Headquarters and General Washington's visit.

The house and its history were the subject of a Pennsylvania State University honors thesis by Beth Ann Twiss Houting, (future Director of Programs and Services of the Historical Society of Pennsylvania), who developed a theory of the house's evolution based on a description in the Federal Direct Tax of 1798, also known as the Window Tax, of a stone dwelling measuring 15 feet by 20 feet. Therefore, the oldest part of the house was identified as a stone portion with later additions on either side. Later it was revealed that while specific dates and entries in 200+ year old County records were mistakenly cited as to origins of structure, it appears other architectural evidence exists that portions of the original 1775 era house remain today.

The 1810 stone structure may have been an addition to the older dwelling that was used as Muhlenberg's headquarters, an expansion that would have coincided with Richard Moore's growing family, as his first two children were born in 1809 and 1811.

An older stone part of the house was built circa 1810, with a further addition built in the Federal style by the time Richard died in 1823, as indicated by the inventory of his estate upon his death. The land was divided between Richard's two sons, with the house going to Edwin, who did not carry out any major building works on the house. Edwin owned the house until his death in 1894 and left his estate to his children.

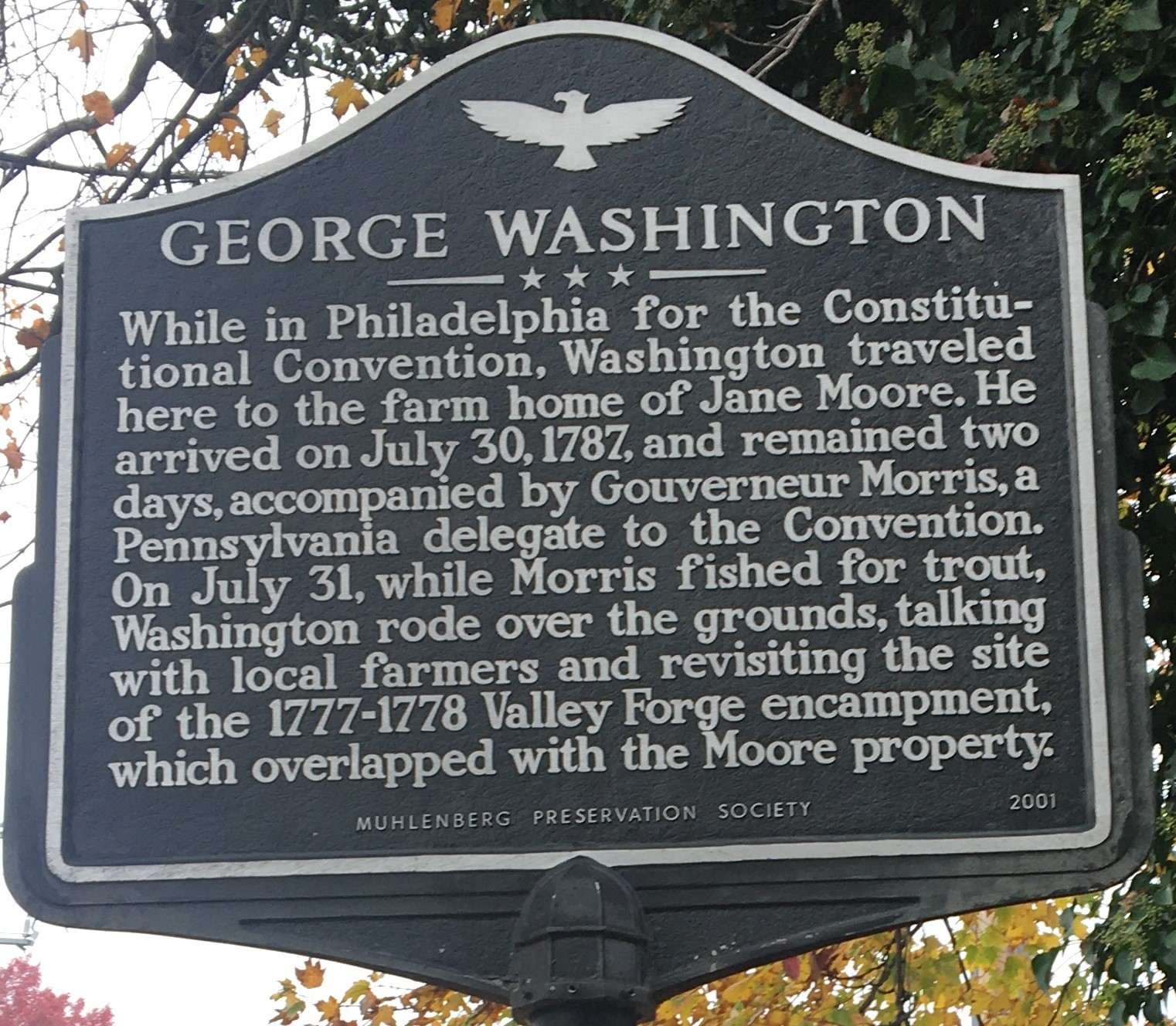
The Muhlenberg Preservation Society (Questers) Moore Road Historical Marker Adjacent to Burgess Arboretum and American Heritage Federal Credit Union

=== 1894–1918 ===
The house passed out of the Moore family's hands in 1903 when it was sold to Frederick A. Poth. Poth was a famed German-American brewer, who was also known for love of history and architecture. A renowned home in Powelton village in Philadelphia (the village was named for Washington's close friend Elizabeth Powel's family) is the home for the Drexel University Alpha Pi Lambda fraternity. It was formerly owned, restored and renovated by Poth.

After Poth's passing in 1905, the house was sold to Edward Binns

=== 1918–1957: Alexander D. Irwin ===
Edward Binns sold the house in 1918 to Alexander D. Irwin, co-founder of the construction company Irwin & Leighton. The house became known as “Winter Quarters Farm”, in reference to the Valley Forge encampment and General Muhlenberg's quartering there. The Irwins divided their time between this house and their Philadelphia home. Irwin was an avid bird watcher and kept or attracted many rare and unique species on the property. The Irwins carried out several restorations, and by 1932 a second story had been added to the original dwelling, as well as a gatehouse, pool and bathhouse. In 1932, Irwin commissioned R. Brognard Okie to expand the house with the addition of an L-shaped wing, as well as a sunroom and enclosed porch. In 1945 Okie was again commissioned to undertake renovations of the house, this time enlarging the original portion of the house, which was being used as servants’ quarters. Okie drew the plans, but he passed away in December 1945, before the completion of the building works in 1946. It is assumed Okie's son Charles oversaw the remainder of the 1946 additions and restoration.

=== 1957–present ===
In 1957, the house and surrounding property were sold to Cabot, Cabot & Forbes, who developed the majority of the land into the King of Prussia Business Park (today's Moore Park). In 1968, the Upper Merion Cultural Center moved into the house, and in 1972, Upper Merion Township purchased the house and surrounding 4.8 acres for $100,000. The Township Parks and Recreation Department began to use the house as its headquarters, and for multiple other purposes. In 1992, the Upper Merion Cultural Center and the Upper Merion Township Parks and Recreation Department had moved out due to the deterioration of the building, which has since been left vacant.

The house has been assigned a Determination of Eligibility (DOE) for the National Register of Historical Places by the Pennsylvania Historical and Museum Commission. Preservation Pennsylvania lists the Moore-Irwin House as one of the most important at risk historic properties to preserve.
