= Rebecca Winborne =

Stitched the first Stars and Bars flags for the Confederacy

- Born: Catherine Rebecca Murphy; November 22, 1831; Louisburg, North Carolina
- Died: June 23, 1918 (aged 86); Wilson, North Carolina
- Resting place: Maplewood Cemetery
- Other names: Betsy Ross of the Confederacy
- Known for: First to sew the Stars and Bars for the Confederates.

Catherine Rebecca Murphy Winborne (November 22, 1831 - July 23, 1918), also known as the 'Betsy Ross of the Confederacy', was the first person to sew the Confederate flag, known as the Stars and Bars.

== Biography ==
Winborne was born on November 22, 1831 in Louisburg, North Carolina to the Murphy family.

Although not the designer, which was Orren Randolph Smith, Winborne stitched the pieces and sewed together a small version of the flag that would become known as the Stars and Bars in February of 1861. Upon completion of the original model it was sent to Montgomery where it was ratified as the flag of the Confederate States of America. During the ratification period she made a second, larger flag of the same design that was flown on the court house square of Louisburg, North Carolina on March 18, 1861. This act would gain her acclaim and lead to many descendants of the Confederacy to refer to her as their 'Betsy Ross'.

Stars and Bars original flag.

After the Civil War, she would be called up to testify in Congress regarding her part in making the original model for the flag.

In 1887, Winborne went to live with her daughter, Josephine T. Webb in Wilson, North Carolina. She lived there for thirty one years before she suffered a stroke which led to her paralysis and eventual death. Winborne died on July 23, 1918 and was buried in Wilson.

== Legacy ==
A memorial was made and dedicated to Winborne by the United Daughters of the Confederacy on April 29, 1921.
