= Andrew de Bolingbroke =

14th-century English politician

Member of the England Parliament for York
- In office 1299–1304

Personal details
- Born: Unknown Unknown
- Died: Unknown Unknown
- Resting place: Unknown
- Spouse: Agnes
- Children: Roger

Andrew de Bolingbroke was one of two Members of Parliament for the constituency of York along with John de Askham from 1299 to 1304.

== Life and politics ==
Andrew was a Bailiff of the city of York from 1303–04. At that time he is recorded as being a chamberlain in the Freeman's Register, a position he held between 1291 and 1307. As a bailiff his duty was to uphold the City Ordinances, but was accused, in 1301, of failing to do so along with several other prominent people including former MP, John de Askham. The charges had been brought following his establishment of a guild whose members had established control of governance of the city, including taxation controls beneficial to its members. As a result of this type of behaviour, Andrew and many other merchants in the guild were unpopular with the citizens to the extent that during his 1309 term as Mayor, he was attacked by a man with a knife.

He held the office of Mayor of the City of York in 1305 and again in 1309. During his tenure as Mayor he is recorded as having sent a writ on 13 June 1305 to the Sheriff of York to recover a debt of 8 marks from the son of Roger Basy, former MP of the city.

He founded a chantry in 1312 at All Saints Church in Ousegate. He was MP for the city of York in 1301.

Political offices
Preceded by John le Sezevaux/Gilbert de Arnald	Member of Parliament; 1299–1304	Next: John le Sezevaux/Thomas le Anguiler
