= Merestone =

Historic house in Delaware, United States

- U.S. National Register of Historic Places
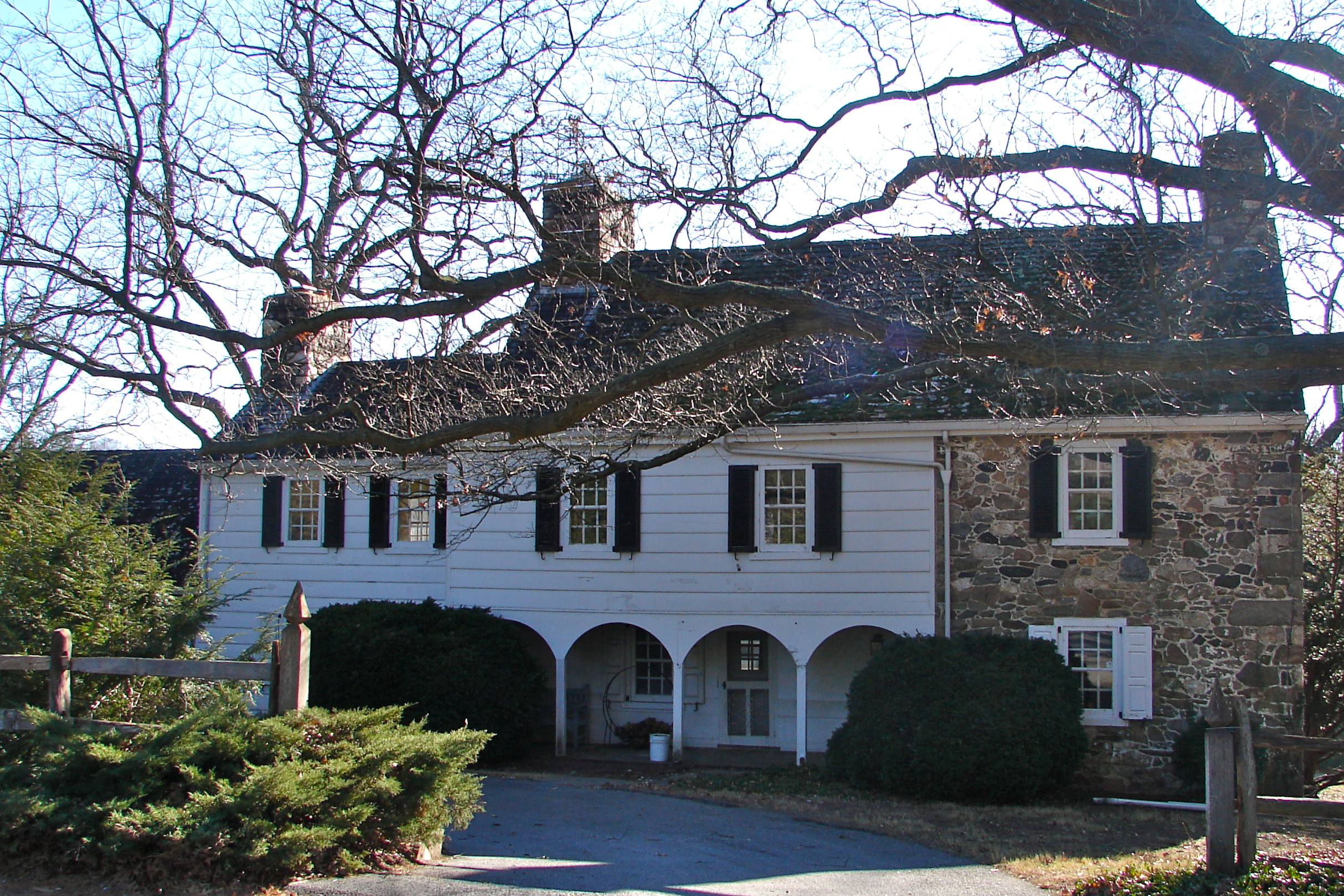
- Merestone House, December 2010

- Location within Pennsylvania Location within the United States
- Location: Yeatman's Station Rd., New Garden Township, Pennsylvania and New Castle County, Delaware
- Coordinates: 39.76276°N 75.74884°W
- Area: 3 acres (1.2 ha)
- Built: 1942
- Architect: Okie, Richardson Brognard (renovation)
- Architectural style: Colonial Revival
- NRHP reference No.: 95000093
- Added to NRHP: March 2, 1995

Merestone, also known as the John S. Reese, IV, House, is an American historic estate that is located in New Garden Township, Chester County, Pennsylvania, and New Castle County, Delaware. Spanning the border of the two states, the estate encompasses the Merestone House, the guest house/garage, a milk house, and a stone shed.

It was added to the National Register of Historic Places in 1995.

== History and architectural features ==
Renovated and added to by architect R. Brognard Okie, this historic structure features elements of the Colonial Revival style. The original log section of Merestone House dates to roughly between 1720 and 1734. It is a two-story, three-bay structure, measuring twenty feet by twenty-four feet. A two-story, two-bay, frame addition was built between 1725 and 1750 and measures nineteen feet by eighteen feet. A two-story, one-bay, wing was added roughly between 1802 and 1806. The house was renovated in the Colonial Revival style between 1941 and 1942. At the same time, Okie built the 1 1/2-story, three-bay, frame, guest house/garage on the stone foundation of a barn that dated to 1806.
