= Appleford/Parsons-Banks Arboretum =

Arboretum in Villanova, Pennsylvania, United States

Coordinates: 40.0529°N 75.3258°W

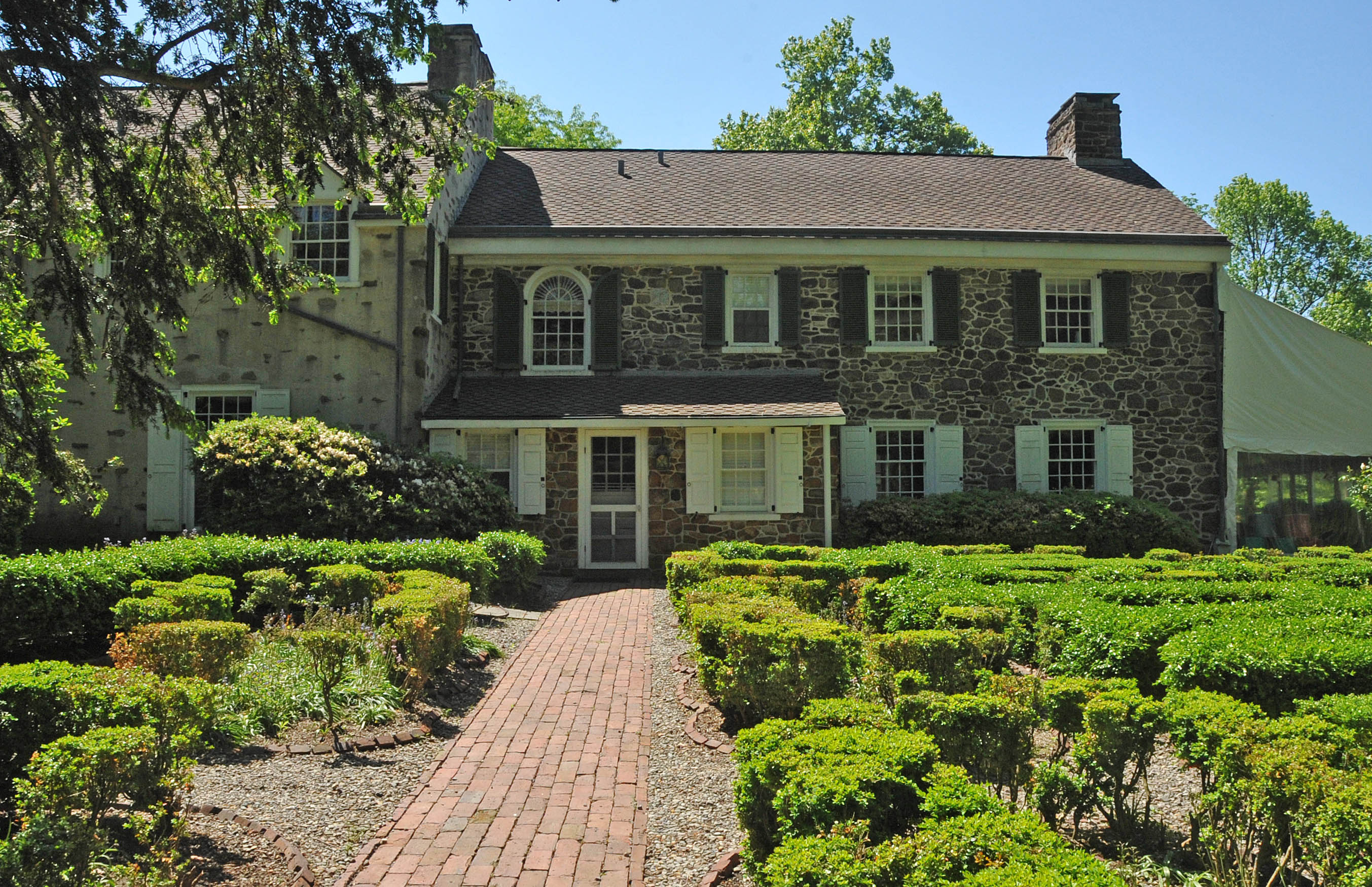
- Stone farmhouse built in the late 18th century
- Interactive map of Appleford/Parsons-Banks Arboretum
- Type: Arboretum
- Location: Villanova, Pennsylvania
- Area: 24 acres (9.7 ha)
- Website: applefordestate.com

Appleford/Parsons-Banks Arboretum 24 acres (9.7 ha) is a non-profit arboretum and country estate located at 770 Mount Moro Road, Villanova, Pennsylvania.

Appleford began in 1692 with William Penn's grant of 100 acres (0.40 km^{2}) to James Moore.^{Note 1} In 1728 Robert Jones erected a one-story stone farmhouse on the site, parts of which still stand. The house was enlarged and updated over the years, and the property grew to be as large as 800 acres (3.2 km^{2}) before it was broken up circa 1900. Today's estate was created in the 1920s by landscape architect Thomas Sears and architect R. Brognard Okie, and contains the furniture and collections of its last owners, Lewis and Anabel Parsons. Mrs. Parsons donated the property in 1973 to Lower Merion Township.

The arboretum contains streams and ponds, woods, rhododendron stands, a rose garden, copper beeches, stone walls, and a series of formal gardens.

== See also ==
- List of botanical gardens in the United States

== Notes ==
1."The house and arboretum are situated on the center portion of the tract of land sold by William Penn, Proprietary of Pennsylvania, to James Moore for which the commissioners of property did issue their warrant on the sixth day of the fifth month 1692." Bronze plaque for Appleford placed by Penn's Grant Chapter of the National Society of Colonial Dames XVII Century.
