= Pennsbury Manor =

Coordinates: 40°07′58″N 74°46′06″W

- U.S. National Register of Historic Places
- Pennsylvania state historical marker
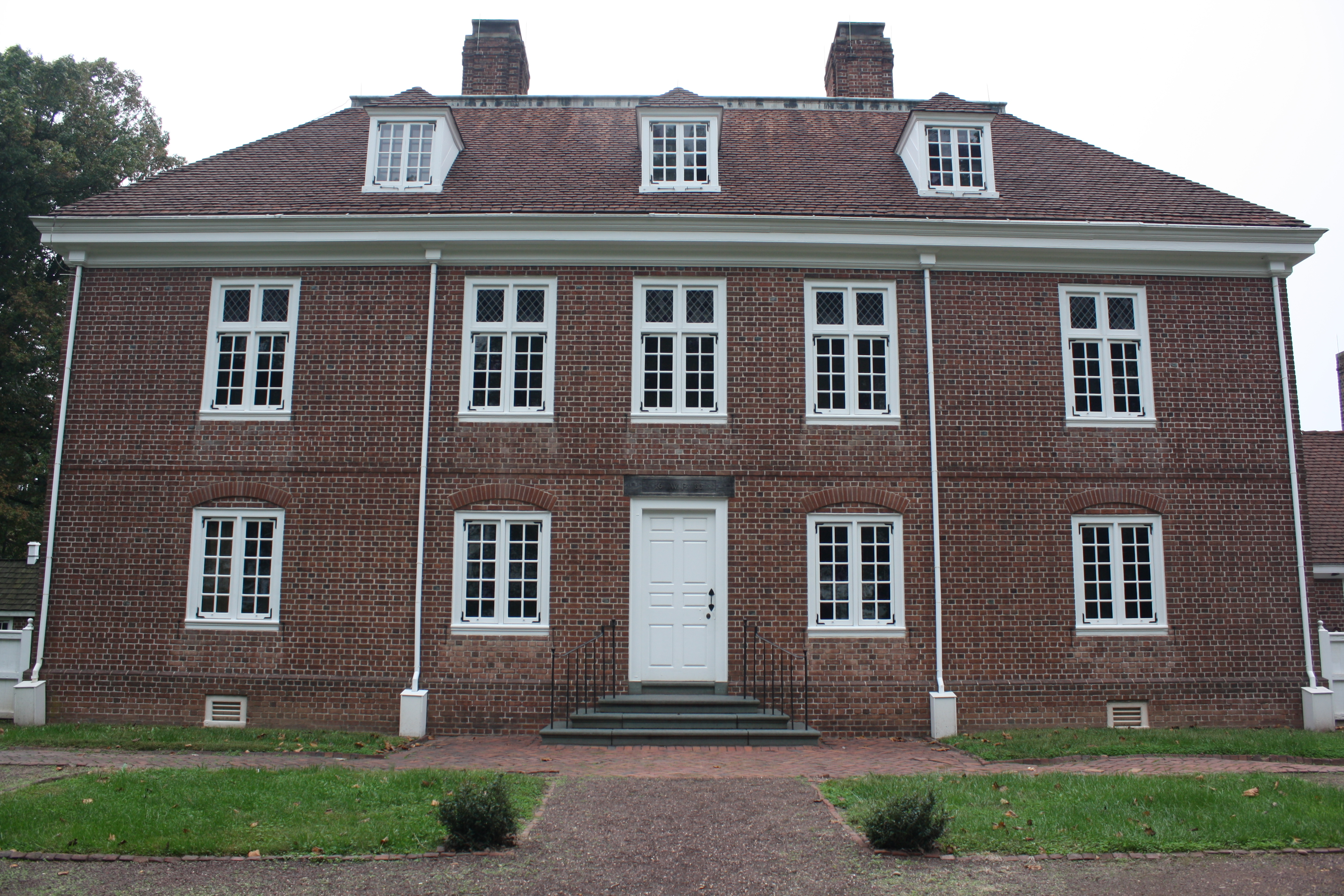
- Pennsbury Manor in Tullytown, Pennsylvania in October 2012

- Location within Pennsylvania Location within the United States
- Interactive map showing the location of Pennysbury Manor
- Nearest city: Tullytown, Pennsylvania, U.S.
- Built: Original: 1683; Recreation: 1939
- Architect: Original: Unknown; Recreation: R. Brognard Okie
- NRHP reference No.: 69000154

Significant dates
- Added to NRHP: October 28, 1969
- Designated PHMC: November 11, 1949 and October 08, 1951

Pennsbury Manor is the colonial estate of William Penn, founder and proprietor of the Colony of Pennsylvania, who lived there from 1699 to 1701. He left it and returned to England in 1701, where he died penniless in 1718. Following his departure and financial woes, the estate fell into numerous hands and disrepair. Since 1939, a reconstructed manor has stood on the original property.

Penn had his manor built on an 8,000-acre (3,200 ha) parcel, part of his much larger grant of land from the Crown. It was located about 25 miles north of Philadelphia along the Delaware River in present-day Falls Township, Bucks County, Pennsylvania.

In 1929, the Pennsylvania legislature authorized acquisition of the property by gift. In 1932 the Warner Company donated nearly ten acres of the property to the state of Pennsylvania as a site for a permanent memorial to Penn. The Pennsylvania Historical Commission was given responsibility for it. The legislature appropriated money to reconstruct the buildings of this estate in a historically accurate manner, to create a house museum in 1939.

Over the decades, more land was acquired, and the property now has a total of 43-acre (17 ha). The property was placed on the National Register of Historic Places on October 28, 1969. The manor house and grounds are administered by the Pennsylvania Historical and Museum Commission in association with The Pennsbury Society, and are open to the public.

The Pennsbury Society has EIN 23-6417452 as a 501(c)(3) Public Charity; in 2024 it claimed total revenue of $495,922 and total assets of $79,655. The Pennsbury Society Endowment Trust has EIN 23-6997962 as a separate 501(c)(3) Public Charity and claimed 2024 revenue of $26,029 with total assets of $1,312,219.

== History ==
William Penn (1644-1718) of England, the new Proprietor of the King's Grant for the Province of Pennsylvania, traveled to the New World in present-day United States in 1682 to start his dream of a Holy Experiment free from religious persecution for his Religious Society of Friends, also known as the Quakers. Penn was granted an 8,000-acre (3,200 ha) tract by King Charles II of England. Penn met with the local Native American Lenape tribes to negotiate fairly and sue for peace, seeking not merely their blessing but cooperation in settling the land. He achieved amicable relations and platted the village of Philadelphia north of the confluence of the large southerly flowing Delaware River and easterly Schuylkill, a smaller tributary entering from the northwest.

The manor of Pennsbury, a summer home for Penn and his family, was established along the Delaware River 25 miles north of Philadelphia, between the river's west bank and what was later named Van Sciver Lake. Construction was begun soon after his arrival in the colony in 1682 and completed around 1686. In addition to the central manor house, separate outbuildings for baking and brewing, a large stable, boathouse, and numerous farm buildings were erected. Penn's plan was to establish the sort of gentleman's country estate similar to his home in England.

Penn spent most of his time in the soon-to-be capital city of Philadelphia governing his settlement, leaving the manor house empty for long periods of time. From 1699 to 1701, he rented Slate Roof House in Philadelphia as his second residence and city townhouse. He left the colony for England in 1701 to fend off a threatening French claim to his British grant, dying destitute in his home town of Ruscombe after having been defrauded by his English agent of rents and income due him. By 1736, one of Penn's sons remarked that the Pennsbury house "was very near falling, the roof open as well as the windows and the woodwork almost rotten." It remained in family hands until 1792.

At some time before 1820, a farmhouse today known as the Crozier House was built over part of the original Pennsbury foundations. It still stands on the larger property but was moved. The Warner Company of Philadelphia, established in 1794 as a dealer in sand, gravel and other construction materials, acquired much of the otherwise deserted land where the manor once stood.

In 1932, on the 250th anniversary of Penn's arrival, the company donated some of the lands to the Commonwealth of Pennsylvania. Charles Warner, its president, presented the deed for a just under ten-acre parcel where the Pennsbury buildings had stood to the state as a permanent memorial to Penn. The Pennsylvania Historical Commission was given responsibility for what was then known as The Pennsbury Memorial.

== Site discovery and reconstruction ==
In the 1920s and 1930s there was considerable interest in preserving buildings and history of colonial America, due in part to the country's celebration of its sesquicentennial and the stresses of waves of immigration, a world war, and the Great Depression. Sites relating to Founding Fathers were reconstructed in this era, including and the long-destroyed Northern Virginia birthplace of George Washington known as Wakefield, in 1930. Abraham Lincoln's former home in New Salem, Illinois was reconstructed in the 1920s, and in Virginia the Rockefeller family supported the restoration and reconstruction of Colonial Williamsburg.

At that time, the commission, Pennsylvania and other sources collaborated to construct a colonial revival manor house and outbuildings at Pennsbury as a home for a house museum dedicated to Penn. Completed in 1940, it is operated as Pennsbury Manor by the Pennsylvania Historical and Museum Commission in association with The Pennsbury Society, a non-profit organization, and is open to the public. Additional acreage has been acquired enlarging the site 43-acre (17 ha). The manor and grounds were listed on the National Register of Historic Places in 1969.

=== Reconstruction ===
Penn wrote to his overseer James Harrison frequently from England during the construction of the estate, providing insight into his intentions and progress of the project. During its early years of ownership the Pennsylvania Historical Commission conducted site mapping, archaeology, and documentary research. In 1934 historian Albert Cook Myers found the buried foundations of the house and a crude drawing on an eighteenth-century survey map. These served as the basis for recreating a typical red-brick manor house on the property.

Pennsbury Manor was designed by local architect R. Brognard Okie, (1875-1945), known for his sensitive Colonial Revival constructions in the area, and restoration of the Betsy Ross House in Philadelphia. It appears to today's analysts that he designed a larger and more elaborate house than the original Pennsbury, believed to have been based on a T-shape. Pennsbury Manor was built 1938–1940. Okie's design decisions drew from other properties of that period in nearby Pennsylvania, asserting that Pennsbury probably influenced their design.

The result is two stories, with a dormered hipped roof serving as an attic. The design is Georgian-influenced Colonial Revival, five bays wide and two piles deep. The building's roof is covered in Ludowici shingle tile designed to match colonial roof tiles of the era. A white wooden door and windows contrast against red brick laid in an English bond. Support buildings in either matching brick or whitewashed wood frames surround the home.

Early anachronisms that were part of the original construction project, such as a white picket fence and brick walkways, have been replaced by more appropriate styles of pale fencing and graveled walks. Bricks were too expensive at the time of Pennsbury Manor's original construction to be used for walkways, and not even the original house was fully constructed in brick. Since the late 20th century the museum staff has concentrated their attentions indoors, creating an increasingly accurate depiction of domestic life in Penn's time through interpretive programs and such decorative elements as period appropriate wall colors, textiles, and furniture arrangements."

Okie did not get the final contract for the landscape, but had submitted a proposal. Historic horticulture was little developed at this time, and architect Thomas Sears' (1880-1960) design once again owed more to Colonial Revival than actual Colonial, " featuring numerous plants only brought from Asia in the 19th century such as Weigela, Kerria japonica, Forsythia, and Chinese Wisteria. The brick bordered "colonial" herb garden was also a 19th-century design element.

== Repatriation ==
The Lands that Pennsbury Manor were built on were originally lands of the Lenape tribe. On April 11, 2022, around 200 Lenape ancestors and their funerary objects were laid to rest on their homelands. The multitude of ancestors and objects had been previously held across the country by different universities and museums, including the Pennsylvania State Museum. It took about 15 years of coordinating between the Lenape tribal historic preservation officers and the staff members of Pennsbury Manor to bring not only the Five Civilized Tribes but the hundreds of ancestors back home. After negotiations, all five tribes of the Delaware Nation agreed to take legal ownership of the new cemetery; their attorney signed the deed to the cemetery on April 19, 2022.
