= South Brook Farm =

Historic house in Pennsylvania, United States

- U.S. National Register of Historic Places
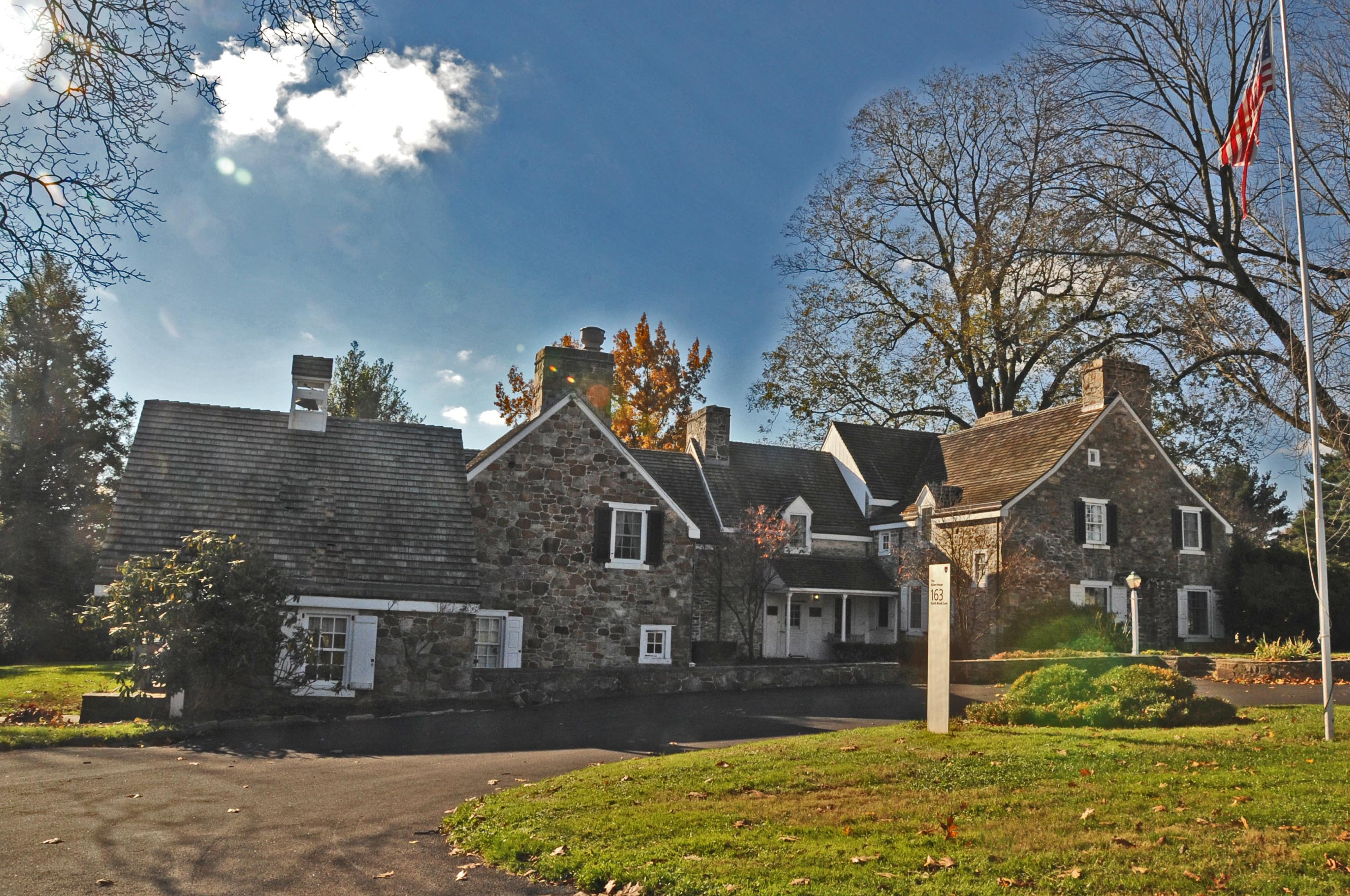
- South Brook Farm, November 2012

- Location within Pennsylvania Location within the United States
- Location: Jct. of Street Rd. and Bird Rd., East Marlborough Township, Pennsylvania
- Coordinates: 39°52′02″N 75°45′12″W
- Area: 2 acres (0.81 ha)
- Built: 1717, 1940
- Architect: R. Brognard Okie
- Architectural style: Colonial Revival
- NRHP reference No.: 91001710
- Added to NRHP: November 14, 1991

The South Brook Farm, also known as the Charles A. Higgins Estate and the New Bolton Center for Veterinary Medicine, is an historic estate located in East Marlborough Township, Chester County, Pennsylvania, United States.

It was added to the National Register of Historic Places in 1991.

== History and architectural features ==
The original section of the house was built in 1717; it was then expanded during the nineteenth century. In 1940, it was modernized and enlarged by the architect R. Brognard Okie, reflecting the Colonial Revival style. Also located on the property are a former stable or carriage house that was transformed into a cottage and photographic studio, an English bank barn, an early twentieth-century terracotta silo, and a one-story garage (1940). This historic house was originally built as the retirement residence of Caleb Pusey (c. 1650–1727), an associate of William Penn and a Quaker leader. The farm remained in the Pusey family until acquired by the industrialist Charles A. Higgins (1882-c. 1956) between 1939 and 1940. He hired the architect R. Brognard Okie to transform the property into a gentleman's estate. Since 1958, the house has been the centerpiece of the University of Pennsylvania's veterinary and animal research complex, known as the New Bolton Center.
