= John le Sezevaux =

Member of the Parliament of England

Member of the England Parliament for York
- In office 1297–1297
- In office 1304–1304
- In office 1306–1306

Personal details
- Born: Unknown Unknown
- Died: Unknown Unknown
- Resting place: Unknown

John le Sezevaux was one of two Members of Parliament for the constituency of York, along with Gilbert de Arnald in the second Parliament of 1297.

== Life and politics ==
John's family came from the small Wold town of Thixendale from which his last name is derived from a French form of the Latin name of that place, Sexdecum Vallibus. He first represented York in the Parliament of 1297 and then again in 1304 and 1306. (though recorded as John de Sezevaux).

Political offices
| Preceded by John le Espicer/Nicholas Clarevaux | Member of Parliament; 1297 | Next: John de Akham/Andrew de Bolingbroke |
