= Nicholas de Selby =

Member of the Parliament of England

Member of the England Parliament for York
- In office 1294–1297
- Succeeded by: John le Espicier

Personal details
- Born: Unknown Unknown
- Died: Unknown Unknown
- Resting place: Unknown
- Children: John

Nicholas de Selby was one of two Members of Parliament for the constituency of York and the first recorded as such. He was elected during the reign of Edward I.

== Life and Politics ==
Related to Hugh de Selby, who was mayor of York by order of the King by way of the Sheriff of York in 1217, his father having been a forester for the Abbey of Selby.

Elected to parliament 1295 on the Sunday after the feast of St Martin on 13 Nov of that year. He took the seat formally the following year.

He served as a Bayliff of the city of York in 1278, 1279 1285 during the reign of Edward I. He became the Mayor of York between 1286 and 1289.

He held lands and tofts in Deighton near Escrick to the south of York which he passed on to his son John His son John was an Apothecary, became a Chamberlain of York in 1317 and Bailiff of York in 1321.

Political offices
Preceded by	Member of Parliament; 1294*1297	Next: John le Espicier
