= John le Espicer =

Member of the Parliament of England

Member of Parliament for York
- In office 1297–1297
- Succeeded by: John le Sezevaux/Gilbert de Arnald

Personal details
- Born: Unknown Unknown
- Died: Unknown Unknown
- Resting place: Unknown
- Children: John

John le Espicer was one of two Members of Parliament for the constituency of York, along with Nicholas Clareveaux in the first Parliament of 1297.

== Life and politics ==
Le Espicer had served as a Bailiff of the city of York in 1278 and as the nineteenth Mayor in 1291. His son, John, would become the thirtieth Mayor between 1301 and 1304. A prominent member of the city, he was appointed the King's Merchant Seal on 15 February 1288, an office of the Crown in many cities at that time. He was elected to Parliament on 25 May 1297.

Political offices
Preceded by Nicholas de Selby/Roger Basy	Member of Parliament; 1297	Next: John le Sezevaux/Gilbert de Arnald
