= Betsy Ross =

American upholsterer (1752–1836)

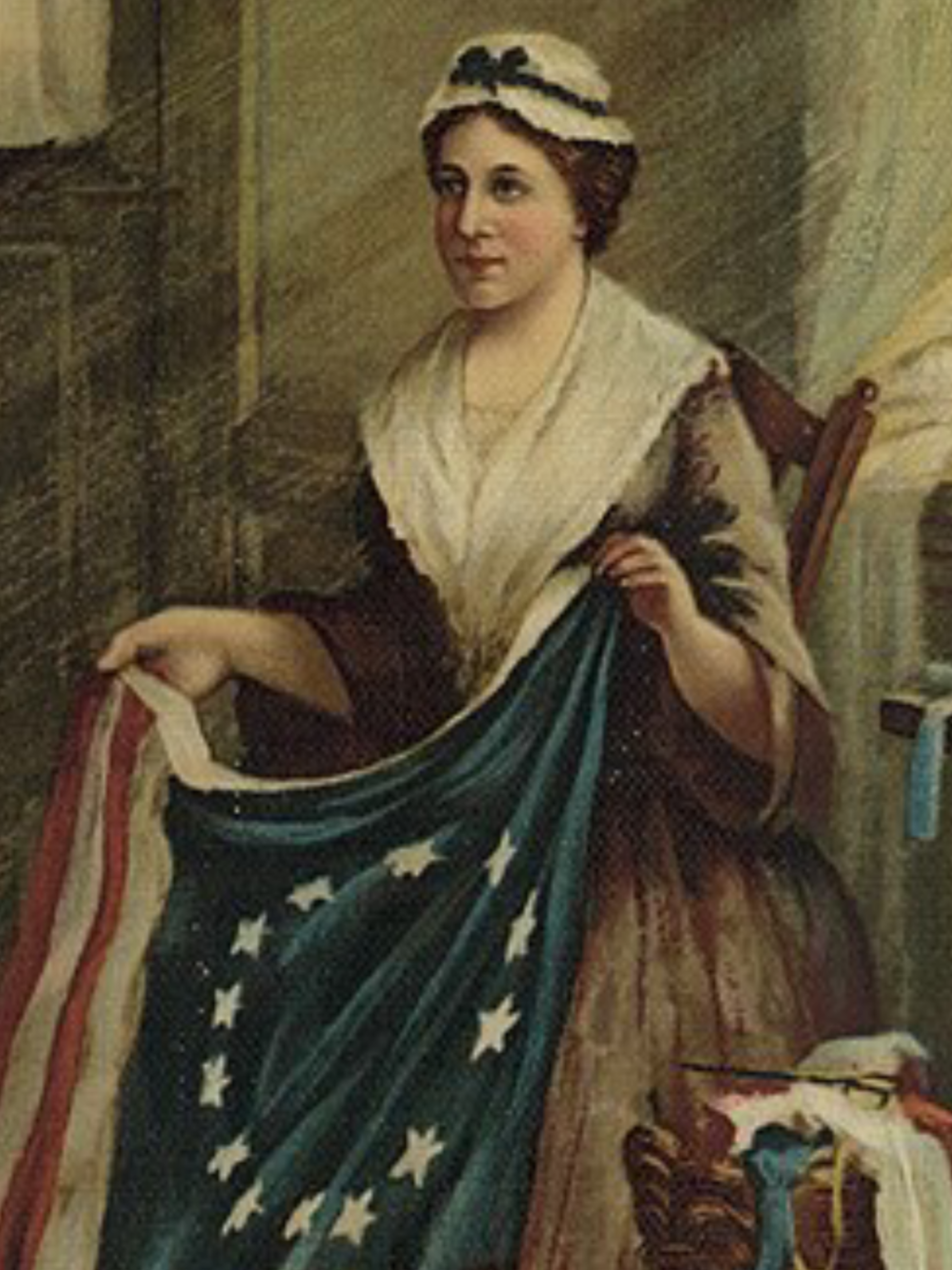
- Posthumous depiction of Ross, from 1893
- Born: Elizabeth Griscom; January 1, 1752; Gloucester City, Colony of New Jersey, British America
- Died: January 30, 1836 (aged 84); Philadelphia, Pennsylvania, U.S.
- Occupations: Upholsterer; also sewed flags for military installations
- Spouse(s): John Ross (m. 1773; died 1775) Joseph Ashburn (m. 1777; died 1782) John Claypoole (m. 1783; died 1817)
- Children: 7

Elizabeth Griscom Ross (née Griscom; January 1, 1752 – January 30, 1836), also known by her second and third married names, Ashburn and Claypoole, was an American upholsterer who was credited by her relatives in 1870 with designing and making the first U.S. flag, commonly known as the Betsy Ross flag. Though historians dismissed the story both then and now, Ross family tradition holds that General George Washington, commander-in-chief of the Continental Army and two members of a congressional committee—Robert Morris and George Ross—visited Ross in 1776. Ross convinced Washington to change the shape of the stars in a sketch of a flag he showed her from six-pointed to five-pointed by demonstrating that it was easier and speedier to cut the latter. However, there is no archival evidence or other recorded verbal tradition to substantiate this story of the first U.S. flag. It appears that the story first surfaced in the writings of her grandson in the 1870s (a century after the fact), with no mention or documentation in earlier decades. The myth was later incorporated into a large oil painting that appeared at the 1893 Chicago World's fair. The painter, Charles Weisgerber, subsequently promoted the myth, even buying a house he deemed The Betsy Ross House. He solicited money nationwide for the upkeep of the house as a tourist attraction. With the solicitations, he provided a synopsis of the myth with reproductions of his painting.

Ross made flags for the Pennsylvania Navy during the American Revolution. After the Revolution, she made U.S. flags for over 50 years, including 50 garrison flags for the U.S. Arsenal on the Schuylkill River during 1811. The flags of the Pennsylvania navy were overseen by the Pennsylvania Navy Board. The board reported to the Pennsylvania Provincial Assembly's Committee of Safety. In July 1775, the President of the Committee of Safety was Benjamin Franklin. Its members included Robert Morris and George Ross. At that time, the committee ordered the construction of gunboats that would eventually need flags as part of their equipment. As late as October 1776, Captain William Richards was still writing to the Committee of Safety to request the design that he could use to order flags for the fleet.

Ross was one of those hired to make flags for the Pennsylvanian fleet. An entry dated May 29, 1777, in the records of the Pennsylvania Navy Board, includes an order to pay her for her work. It is worded as follows:

An order on William Webb to Elizabeth
Ross for fourteen pounds twelve shillings and two
pence for Making Ships Colours [etc.] put into William
Richards store……………………………………….£14.12.2

Pennsylvania Navy Ensign

The Pennsylvania navy's ship colors included an ensign, a long, narrow pennant, and a short, narrow pennant. The ensign was a blue flag with 13 stripes—seven red stripes and six white stripes in the flag's canton (upper-left-hand corner). It was flown from a pole at the rear of the ship. The long pennant had 13 vertical, red-and-white stripes near the mast; the rest was solid red. It flew from the top of the ship's mainmast, the center pole holding the sails. The short pennant was solid red, and flew from the top of the ship's mizzenmast—the pole holding the ship's sails nearest the stern (rear of the ship).

== Early life and education ==
Betsy Ross was born on January 1, 1752, to Samuel Griscom and Rebecca James Griscom in Gloucester City, Colony of New Jersey (modern-day New Jersey). Samuel Griscom is listed as living at Comb's Alley in Philadelphia in December 1754 based on an advertisement related to a plantation for sale on the Newton Creek in Old Gloucester County or present day Camden County NJ. Combs Alley ran between 2nd and Front Streets and is now Cuthbert Street. She moved with her family to Philadelphia, Pennsylvania, when she was a toddler. Ross was the ninth of seventeen children, of whom only nine survived childhood. A sister, Sarah (1745–1747), and brother, William (1748–1749), died before Elizabeth ("Betsy") was born (another sister, Sarah Griscom Donaldson (1749–1785), was named after the earlier deceased Sarah). Ross was just five years old when her sister Martha (1754–1757) died, and another sister, Ann (1757–1759), lived to just the age of two. Brothers Samuel I (1753–1756) and Samuel II (1758–1761) both died at age three. Two others, twins, brother Joseph (1759–1762) and sister Abigail (1759–1762), died in one of the frequent smallpox epidemics in the autumn of 1762. Ross grew up in a household where the plain dress and strict discipline of the Quakers dominated. She learned to sew from a great aunt, Sarah Elizabeth Ann Griscom. Ross's great-grandfather, Andrew Griscom, a member of the Quakers and a carpenter, had emigrated in 1680 from England.

After Ross' schooling at a Quaker-run state school, her father apprenticed her to an upholsterer named William Webster.

== Ross family tradition ==
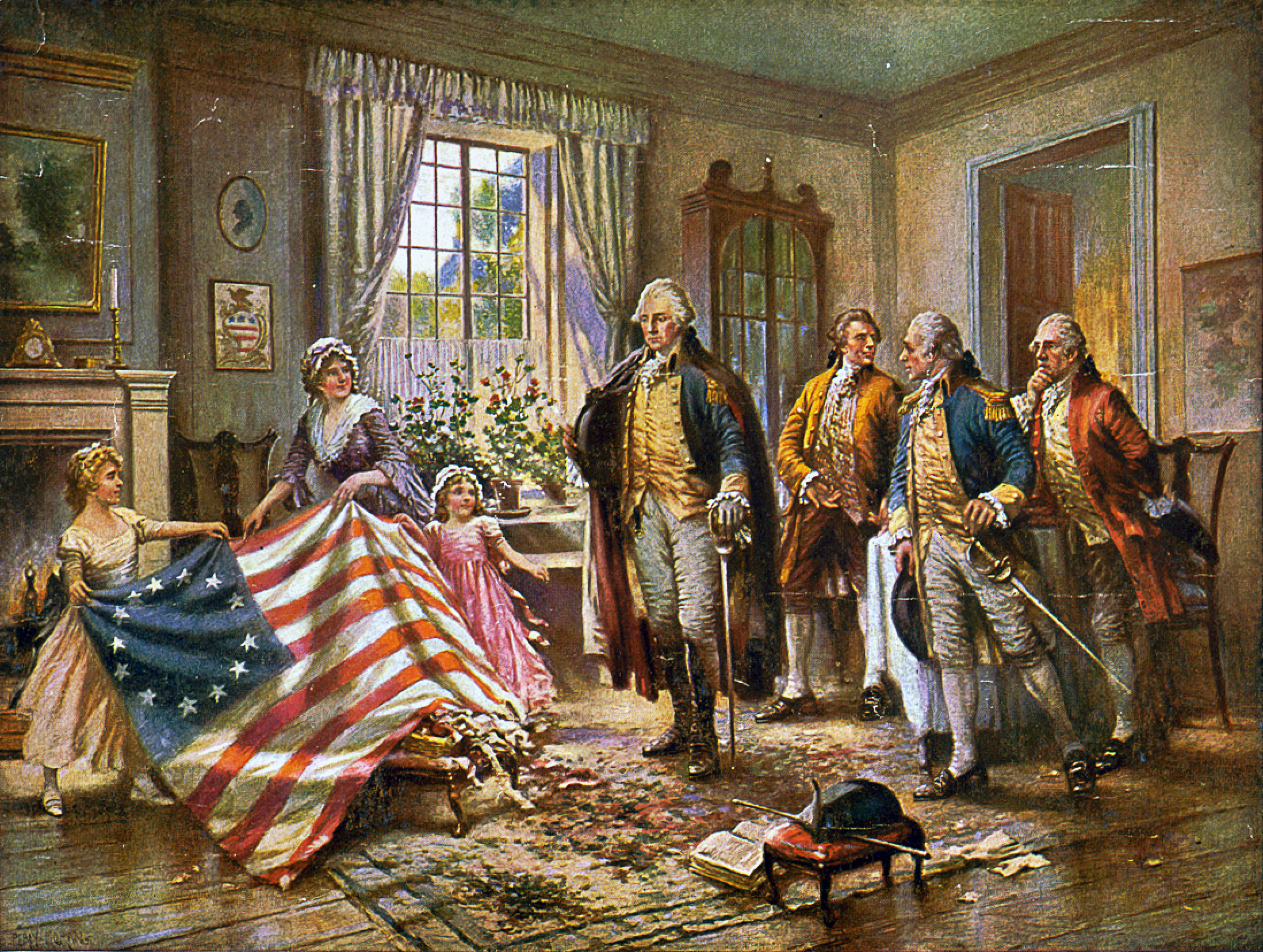
Painting depicting the story of Betsy Ross' presenting the first U.S. flag to General George Washington, by Edward Percy Moran, c. 1917

The “Betsy Ross flag” that she purportedly designed

Research conducted by the National Museum of American History of the Smithsonian Institution in Washington, D.C., notes that the story of Betsy Ross' making the first U.S. flag for General George Washington entered into the U.S. consciousness about the time of the 1876 centennial celebrations, with the Centennial Exposition then scheduled to be held in Philadelphia. In 1870, Ross's grandson, William J. Canby, presented a research paper to the Historical Society of Pennsylvania in which he claimed that his grandmother had "made with her hands the first flag" of the United States. Canby said he first obtained this information from his aunt Clarissa Sydney (Claypoole) Wilson in 1857, 20 years after Ross's death. Canby dates the historic episode based on Washington's journey to Philadelphia, in the late spring of 1776, a year before the Second Continental Congress passed the first Flag Act of June 14, 1777.

In the 2008 book The Star-Spangled Banner: the Making of an American Icon, Smithsonian Institution experts point out that Canby's recounting of the event appealed to patriotic Americans then eager for stories about the Revolution and its heroes and heroines. Betsy Ross was promoted as a patriotic role model for young girls and a symbol of women's contributions to American history. American historian Laurel Thatcher Ulrich further explored this line of enquiry in a 2007 article, "How Betsy Ross Became Famous: Oral Tradition, Nationalism, and the Invention of History".

Ross was merely one of several flag makers in Philadelphia (such as Rebecca Young, who is historically documented to have made the earlier Continental Union Flag of 1775–76, with the British Union Jack of the crosses of St. George and St. Andrew, in the upper corner canton and 13 alternating red and white stripes for the "United Colonies") for the Continental Army, along with many other ships' colors, banners, and flags which were advertised in local newspapers.

Rebecca Young's daughter Mary Young Pickersgill (1776–1857) made the flag of 15 stars and stripes in 1813, begun at her house and finished on the floor of a nearby brewery, delivered to the commander of the fort the year before the British attack of September 12–14, 1814, on Fort McHenry in Baltimore, during the War of 1812, (receiving a government-issued receipt for the work of two flags, a large 30 by 42 foot (9.1 by 12.8 m) "garrison flag" and a smaller "storm flag"), then seen by Francis Scott Key (1779–1843) and which inspired him to write the poem which later became the national anthem, The Star-Spangled Banner. Pickersgill's small 1793 rowhouse is still preserved in East Baltimore's Old Town neighborhood at East Pratt and Albemarle Streets and is known as the "Flag House & Star-Spangled Banner Museum". Occasionally over the decades, there has been some controversy and disagreement between the relative merits and historical accuracies of the two flag-making traditions and historical sites in Philadelphia and Baltimore. It is thought that Ross's only contribution to the flag design was to change the 6-pointed stars to the easier 5-pointed stars. Scholars, however, accept the claim by Francis Hopkinson—a member of the Continental Congress who designed most of the elements of the Great Seal of the United States—that he created designs for the early U.S. flag. Hopkinson submitted letters to Congress in 1780 requesting payment for his designs. Hopkinson was the only person to make such a claim in the Revolutionary War era.

== Personal life ==
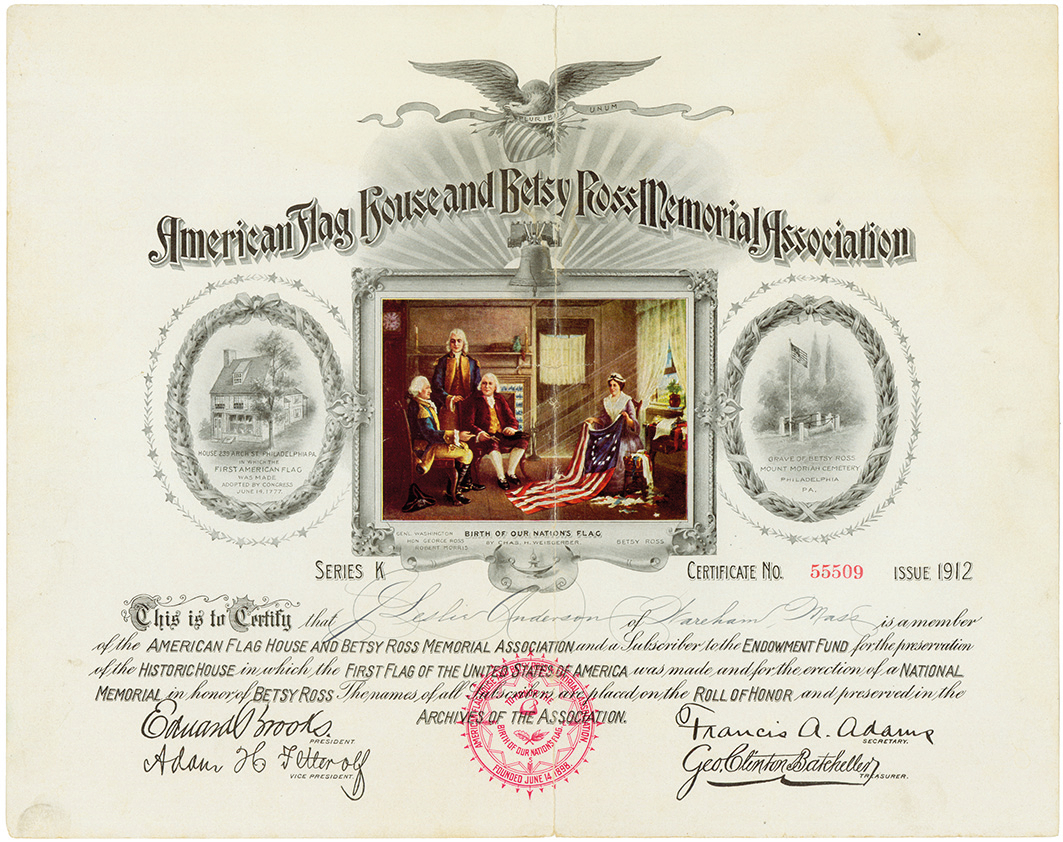
Certificate of the American Flag House and Betsy Ross Memorial Association, issued 1912; at left and right vignettes of the Betsy Ross House and with the then current grave site of Betsy Ross.

While Griscom was apprenticed to upholsterer William Webster, she met John Ross, a nephew of George Ross Jr, a signer of the United States Declaration of Independence. John's parents were Sarah Leach and the Rev. Aeneas Ross, a Church of England (later Episcopal) priest and assistant rector at the historic city parish of Christ Church. Griscom and Ross eloped in 1773, marrying at Hugg's Tavern in Gloucester City, New Jersey.

The marriage caused a split from her Griscom family and meant her expulsion from the Quaker congregation. Before his marriage to Betsy, John Ross established his upholder's shop business in February 1773, as advertised in the Pennsylvania Gazette on February 24, 1773. Betsy joined John in the upholstery business and later joined Christ Church, where their fellow congregants occasionally included visiting colony of Virginia militia regimental commander, colonel, and soon-to-be-general George Washington (of the newly organized Continental Army) and his family from their home Anglican parish of Christ Church in Alexandria, Virginia, near his Mount Vernon estate on the Potomac River, along with many other visiting notaries and delegates in future years to the soon-to-be-convened Continental Congress and the political/military leadership of the colonial rebellion. Betsy and John Ross had no children.

The American Revolutionary War broke out when the Rosses had been married for two years. As a member of the local Pennsylvania Provincial Militia and its units from the city of Philadelphia, John Ross was assigned to guard munitions. He died in 1775. According to one legend, he was killed by a gunpowder explosion, but family sources provide doubts about this claim. John Ross is listed as dying 'fever' and was buried Jan. 21, 1776 at Christ Church in Philadelphia. The 24-year-old Elizabeth ("Betsy") continued working in the upholstery business repairing uniforms and making tents, blankets, and stuffed paper tube cartridges with musket balls for prepared packaged ammunition in 1779 for the Continental Army.

There is speculation that Ross was the "beautiful young widow" who distracted Carl von Donop in Mount Holly, New Jersey, after the Battle of Iron Works Hill, thus keeping his forces out of the crucial "turning-of-the-tide" Battle of Trenton on the morning of December 26, 1776, in which Hessian soldiers were defeated after the crossing of the Delaware River.

On June 15, 1777, she married her second husband, mariner Joseph Ashburn. In 1780, Ashburn's ship was captured by a Royal Navy frigate and he was charged with treason (for being of British ancestry—naturalization to American colonial citizenship was not recognized) and imprisoned at Old Mill Prison in Plymouth, England. During this time, their first daughter, Zilla, died at the age of nine months and their second daughter, Eliza, was born. Ashburn died in the British jail.

Three years later, in May 1783, she married John Claypoole, who had earlier met Joseph Ashburn in the English Old Mill Prison and had informed Ross of her husband's circumstances and death. John Claypoole's diary and family Bible were rediscovered 240 years later in June 2020.

The couple had five daughters: Clarissa, Susanna, Jane, Rachel, and Harriet (who died in infancy). With the birth of their second daughter Susanna in 1786, they moved to a larger house on Philadelphia's Second Street, settling down to a peaceful post-war existence, as Philadelphia prospered as the temporary national capital (1790–1800) of the newly independent United States of America, with the first president, George Washington; his vice president, John Adams; and the convening members of the new federal government and the U.S. Congress.

In 1793, her mother, father, and sister Deborah Griscom Bolton (1743–1793) all died in another severe epidemic of yellow fever, a disease found in the 19th century to be spread by infected mosquitoes. After two decades of poor health, John Claypoole died in 1817. Ross continued the upholstery business for 10 more years. Upon retirement, she moved in with her daughter Susanna Claypoole (1786–1875), in a section of Abington Township, Montgomery County, Pennsylvania, while Susanna's older sister Clarissa (1785–1864) took over their mother's business back in the city.

== Death and burials ==
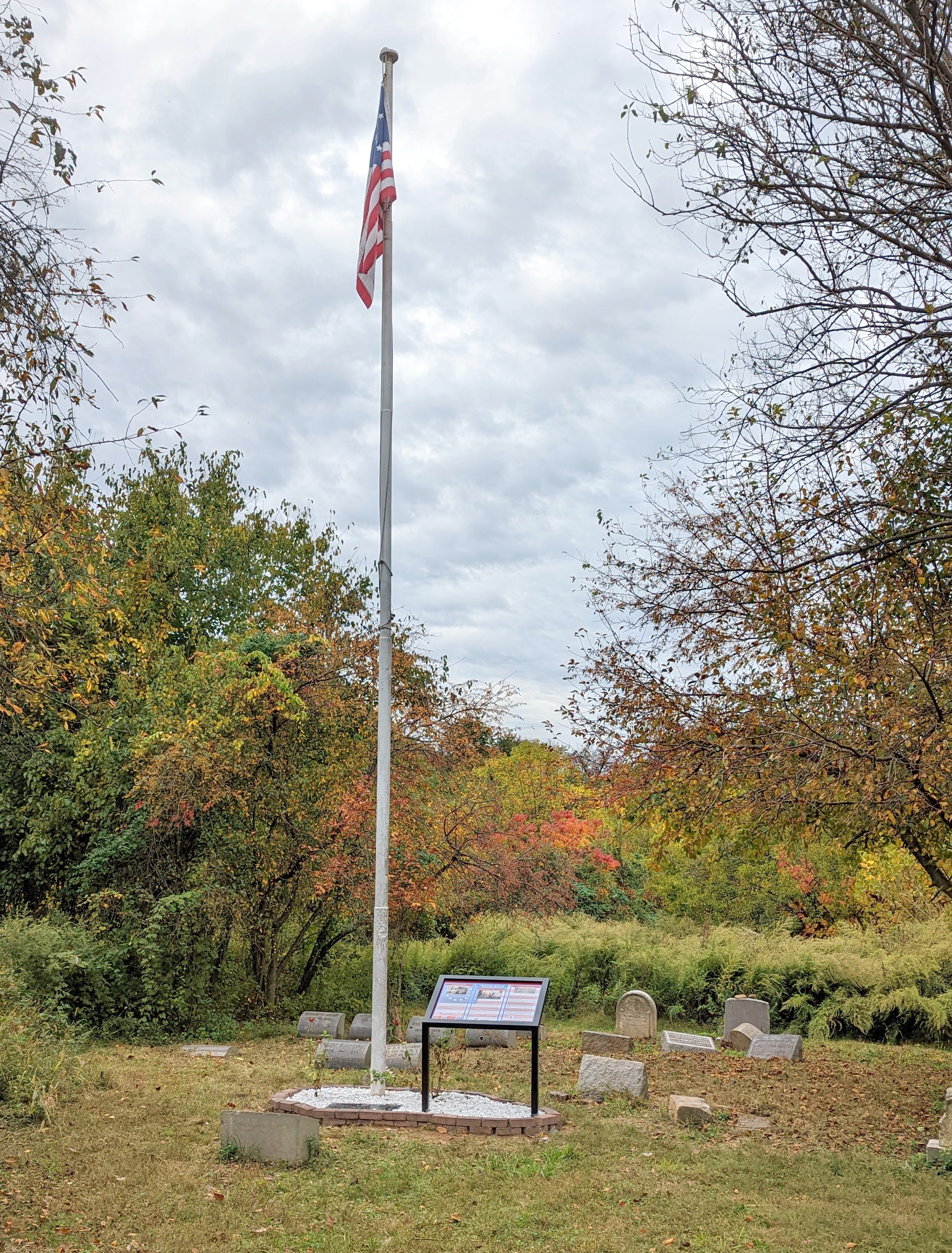
The Daughters of the American Revolution erected a flagpole, then later a plaque and marker to commemorate the burial site of Betsy Ross in Mount Moriah Cemetery

Ross, by then completely blind, spent her last three years living with her middle Claypoole daughter Jane (1792–1873) in Philadelphia, which was rapidly growing and industrializing. On Saturday, January 30, 1836, 60 years after the Declaration of Independence, Betsy Ross died at age 84. She was survived by one daughter with John Ashburn, Eliza, and four daughters with John Claypoole: Clarissa, Susanna, Jane, and Rachel, and one sister, Hannah Griscom Levering (1755–1836), who herself died about 11 months later.

The so-called Betsy Ross House is a popular tourist site in Philadelphia, but it is still a matter of historical academic dispute whether she actually lived there, as evidence indicates she actually lived from 1776 to 1779 in a house next door that was torn down after the remaining house was designated.

Ross' body was first interred at the Free Quaker burial grounds on North Fifth Street in Philadelphia. In 1856, the remains of Ross and her third husband John Claypoole were moved from the Free Quaker Burying Ground to Mount Moriah Cemetery. The practice of cemeteries purchasing the remains of famous historical individuals was common in order to drive additional business. The Daughters of the American Revolution erected a flagpole at the site of her grave in her memory.

In 1975, in preparation for the American Bicentennial, city leaders ordered the remains moved to the courtyard of the Betsy Ross House. However, cemetery workers found no remains beneath her tombstone. Bones found elsewhere in the family plot were deemed to be hers and were reinterred in the current grave visited by tourists at the Betsy Ross House.

== Legacy ==
The Betsy Ross Bridge, connecting Philadelphia with Pennsauken Township, New Jersey, across the Delaware River is named in her honor.

Biographer Marla Miller argues that Ross' legacy should not be about a single flag, but rather what her story tells us about working women and men during the American Revolution.

Betsy Ross School in Mahwah, New Jersey, is named for her.

=== Betsy Ross postage stamp ===
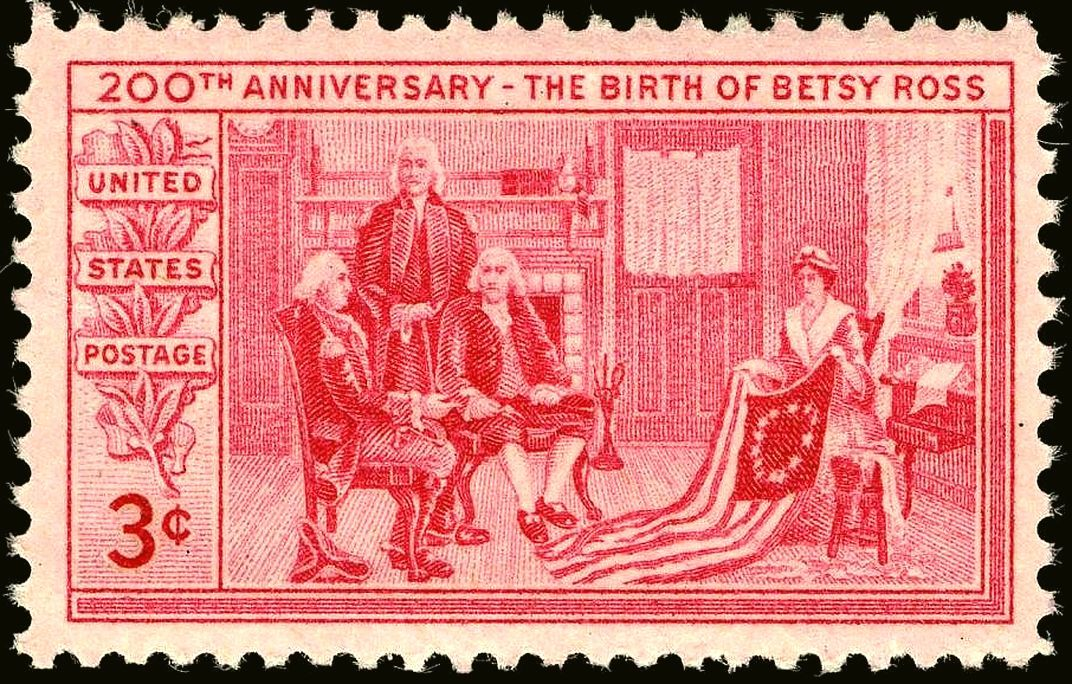
Betsy Ross 200th Anniversary commemorative stamp, issued in 1952

On January 1, 1952, the U.S. Post Office issued a commemorative postage stamp to honor the 200th anniversary of her birth. It shows her presenting the new 13-striped, 13-starred flag to George Washington, with Robert Morris, and George Ross present. The design was taken from a painting by Charles H. Weisberger, one of the founders and first custodian of the Memorial Association, who had cared for and operated the Ross House. This was issued when the Ross legend was still strong and accepted by many of the American public and before additional historical and academic scrutiny.

== Ancestry ==
Ancestors of Betsy Ross

8. Andrew Griscom
2. Samuel Griscom
1. Elizabeth Griscom
3. Rebecca James

== Bibliography ==
- "Betsy Ross Issue". Smithsonian National Postal Museum.
