= Roger Basy =

Member of the Parliament of England

Member of the England Parliament for York
- In office 1294–1297
- Succeeded by: John le Espicier/Nicholas Clareveaux

Personal details
- Born: Unknown Unknown
- Died: Unknown Unknown
- Resting place: Unknown
- Spouse: Preciosa
- Children: Roger; Richard; Constance
- Parent: Walter

Roger Basy was one of two people to be the first recorded Members of Parliament for the constituency of York. He was elected during the reign of Edward I.

== Life and politics ==
He was elected in 1294 to serve in the Parliament of 1295.

Prior to this he had served the city of York as a Bailiff in 1277 and as the eighteenth Mayor in 1290. He is credited with the founding of one of two chantries in St Mary Bishophill. He was reported to have befriended Edward I during the King's stay in York and Cawood following the campaigns in Scotland. In 1292 he gave a messuauge, or more commonly known as a plot of land with a dwelling and outbuildings, in Skeldergate to the Selby Abbey.

His son Roger inherited the manor at Bilbrough to the west of the city of York from his father. Bilbrough Manor had been given to Roger by Sir Simon de Chauncy.

Roger Basy, and another citizen named as John Sampson, benefited from the results of the Statute of the Jewry during Edward I reign, when, on 15 November 1279, Queen Eleanor granted them the land and buildings in Coney Street where there was one of two possible synagogues in York.

Political offices
Preceded by	Member of Parliament; 1294*1297	Next: John le Espicier/Nicholas Clareveaux
