= Bolingbroke Mansion =

Bolingbroke Mansion is an 18th-century mansion located in Radnor, Pennsylvania, now used as a party house.

== Early history ==
Bolingbroke Mansion was originally built in the early 18th century, about fifty years before American independence. The Spring House bears the inscription “1727”. The fieldstone from which it was constructed, some of which is still intact today, came from Colonial gristmills along Gulph Creek.

== Later history and ownership ==
In 1901, the property was purchased by Ledyard Heckscher from Samuel Broadbent, a prominent Philadelphia businessman and politician. Two paintings painted by Heckscher's wife still hang in the mansion's living room. The Heckschers hired architect R. Brognard Okie to renovate, remodel, and enlarge the mansion.

In 1949, Bolingbroke was bought by Roy J. Mckee and his wife. Ten years later, St. Martin's Episcopal Church acquired the property and grounds from the McKee's for their parish house.

Today, wedding ceremonies, wedding receptions, parties, corporate meetings, and other events are held at Bolingbroke Mansion.

== Facilities ==
Bolingbroke Mansion contains four reception rooms, one porch, a brick terrace, a few gardens, and a room for ceremonies.
