= New Garden Township, Pennsylvania =

Township in Pennsylvania, US

New Garden Township
- Township
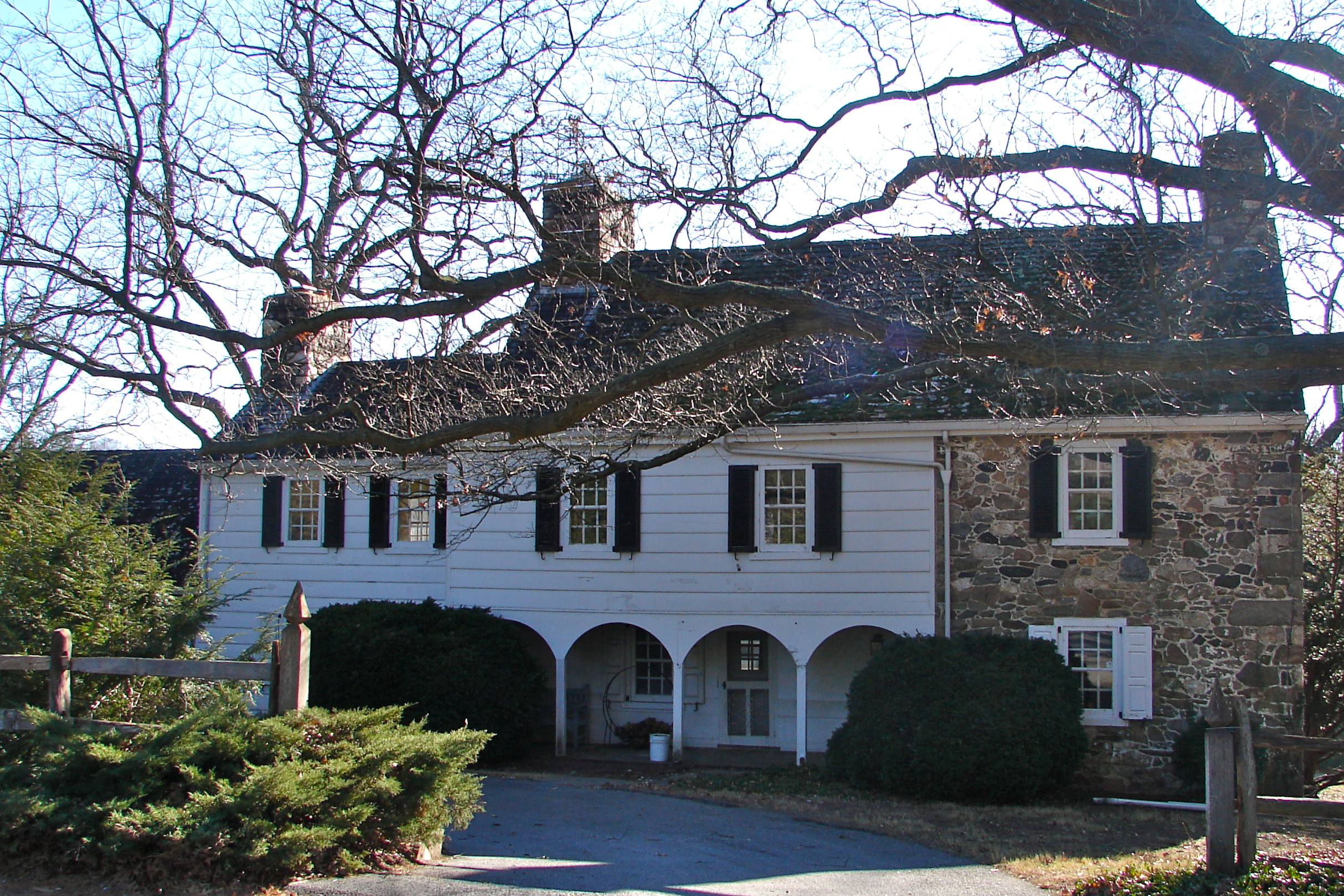
- Merestone, a historic estate in the township

- Location of New Garden Township in Chester County, Pennsylvania and of Chester County in Pennsylvania

- Location of Pennsylvania in the United States
- Coordinates: 39°50′08″N 75°46′01″W
- Country: United States
- State: Pennsylvania
- County: Chester

Area
  - Total: 16.29 sq mi (42.18 km^{2})
  - Land: 16.11 sq mi (41.73 km^{2})
  - Water: 0.17 sq mi (0.45 km^{2})
- Elevation: 472 ft (144 m)

Population (2020)
  - Total: 11,363
  - Density: 705.2/sq mi (272.3/km^{2})
- Time zone: UTC-5 (EST)
  - Summer (DST): UTC-4 (EDT)
- Area code: 610
- FIPS code: 42-029-53608
- Website: www.newgarden.org

New Garden Township is a township in Chester County, Pennsylvania, United States, which was organized in 1714. The population was 11,363 at the 2020 census.

New Garden is the center of the mushroom agribusiness in southeastern Pennsylvania with a higher concentration of composting, mushroom growing, packaging, and shipping businesses than in any other municipality in the area. It was named for the New Garden Friends' Meeting House, an eighteenth-century brick house of worship of the Religious Society of Friends, within its territorial limits.

== History ==
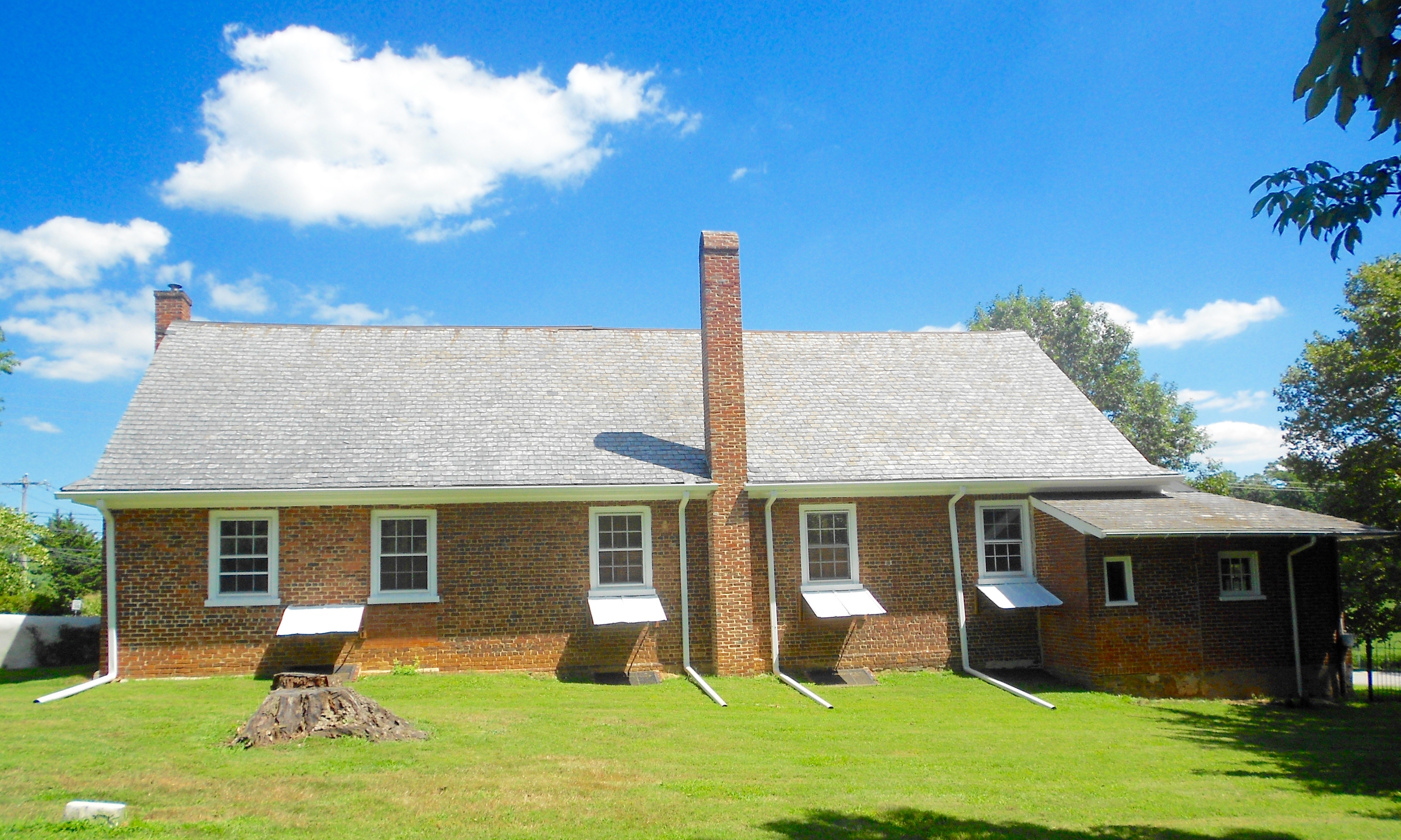
New Garden Friends Meeting in the township

Merestone was added to the National Register of Historic Places in 1995.

== Geography ==
According to the U.S. Census Bureau, the township has a total area of 16.2 square miles (42 km^{2}), of which 16.1 square miles (42 km^{2}) is land and 0.1 square miles (0.26 km^{2}), or 0.31%, is water. It contains the census-designated place of Toughkenamon.

== Demographics ==
Historical population
Census	Pop.	Note	%±
1930	2,391		—
1940	2,716		13.6%
1950	3,027		11.5%
1960	3,718		22.8%
1970	4,153		11.7%
1980	4,790		15.3%
1990	5,430		13.4%
2000	9,083		67.3%
2010	11,984		31.9%
2020	11,363		−5.2%
2020

At the 2010 census, the township was 66.8% non-Hispanic White, 3.0% Black or African American, 0.5% Native American, 3.0% Asian, and 2.2% were two or more races. 26.4% of the population were of Hispanic or Latino ancestry.

As of the 2020 census, there were 11,363 people, 2,700 households, and 2,200 families residing in the township. The population density was 562.9 inhabitants per square mile (217.3/km^{2}). There were 2,831 housing units at an average density of 175.5 per square mile (67.8/km^{2}). The racial makeup of the township was 87.86% White, 2.60% African American, 0.77% Native American, 2.99% Asian, 0.04% Pacific Islander, 8.07% from other races, and 1.61% from two or more races. Hispanic or Latino of any race were 22.73% of the population.

There were 2,700 households, out of which 46.9% had children under the age of 18 living with them, 70.6% were married couples living together, 6.4% had a female householder with no husband present, and 18.5% were non-families. 14.0% of all households were made up of individuals, and 4.5% had someone living alone who was 65 years of age or older. The average household size was 3.16 and the average family size was 3.45.

In the township, the population was spread out, with 30.7% under the age of 18, 8.2% from 18 to 24, 34.1% from 25 to 44, 19.7% from 45 to 64, and 7.2% who were 65 years of age or older. The median age was 34 years. For every 100 females there were 119.2 males. For every 100 females age 18 and over, there were 121.8 males.

The median income for a household in the township was $75,307, and the median income for a family was $89,812. Males had a median income of $54,524 versus $32,792 for females. The per capita income for the township was $30,364. About 0.8% of families and 5.7% of the population were below the poverty line, including none of those under age 18 and 11.4% of those age 65 or over.

== Transportation ==
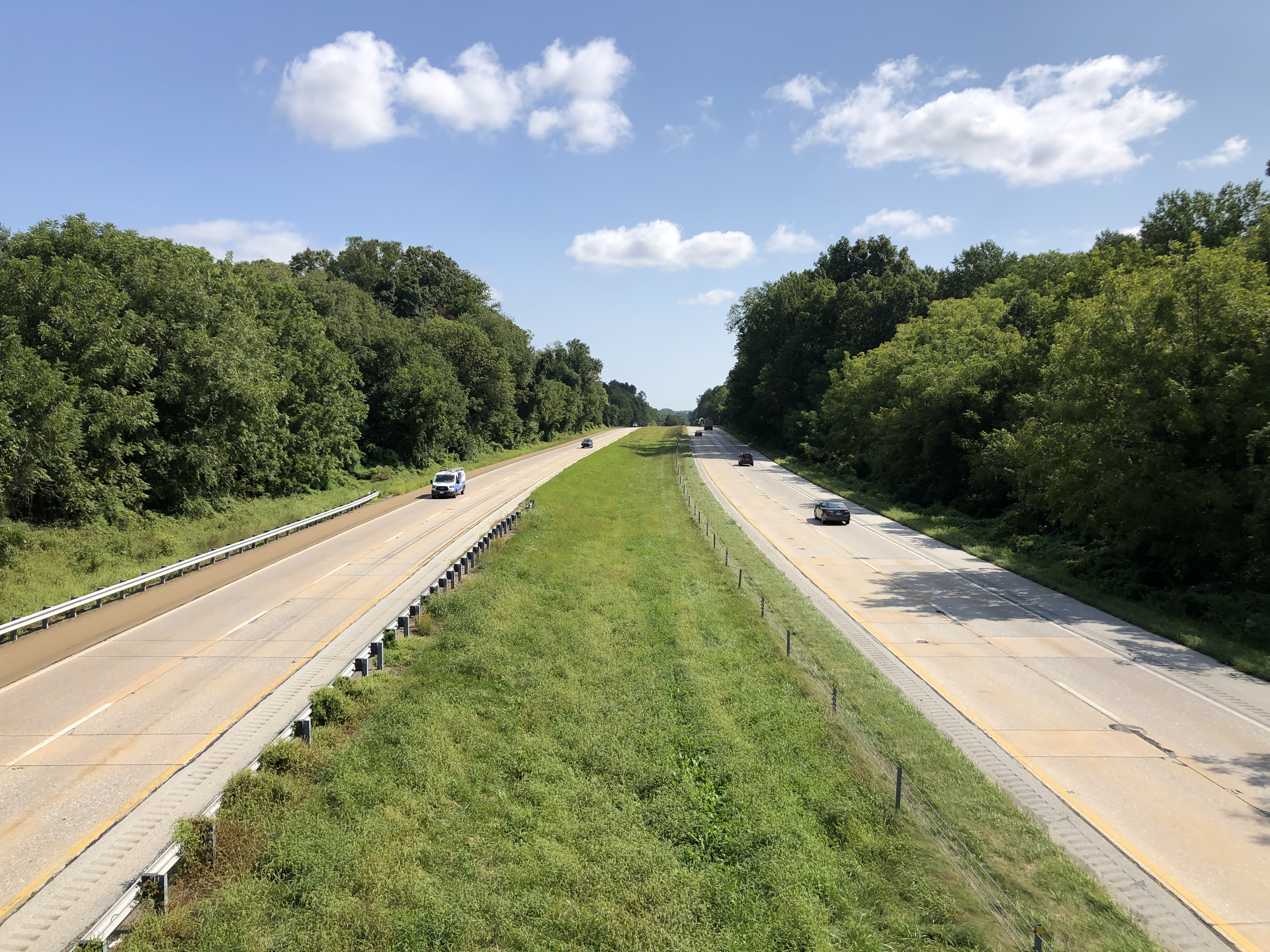
US 1 northbound in New Garden Township

As of 2020, there were 85.73 miles (137.97 km) of public roads in New Garden Township, of which 24.88 miles (40.04 km) were maintained by the Pennsylvania Department of Transportation (PennDOT) and 60.85 miles (97.93 km) were maintained by the township.

U.S. Route 1 is the most prominent highway serving New Garden Township. It follows the Kennett Oxford Bypass along an east-west alignment across the northern portion of the township. Pennsylvania Route 41 is the only other numbered roads serving the township. It follows Gap Newport Pike along a northwest-southeast alignment through the middle of the township.
