= New Bolton Center =

- University of Pennsylvania School of Veterinary Medicine
- Location of New Bolton Center in Pennsylvania

Geography
- Location: Kennett Square, Pennsylvania, U.S.
- Coordinates: 39°52′08″N 75°45′17″W

Organisation
- Type: Veterinary hospital
- Affiliated university: University of Pennsylvania

History
- Founded: 1958

Links
- Website: www.vet.upenn.edu/new-bolton-center/

New Bolton Center is the University of Pennsylvania School of Veterinary Medicine's 700 acre campus in Kennett Square, Pennsylvania. It is home to one of the busiest large animal teaching veterinary clinics in the nation. Since 1958, it has been located at the former South Brook Farm.

Founded in 1964 with contributions from equestrienne Esther du Pont Thouron and others, each year the George D. Widener Hospital for Large Animals (named for horseman George D. Widener Jr.) sees more than 4,000 patient visits, and its Field Service sees more than 31,000 patient visits. In addition to its role as one of the nation's preeminent equine surgical facilities, New Bolton Center includes hospital facilities for the care of large/ food animals, including equids, bovids, camelids, small ruminants, and swine. The campus also contains diagnostic laboratories, cooperated with the Pennsylvania Animal Diagnostic System (PADLS) serving the animal agriculture industry as well as the monitoring of emerging and infectious disease. Prior to the opening of "New" Bolton Center in 1952, the old Bolton Mansion in Levittown was the site of the farm for the School of Veterinary Medicine.
