= Betsy Ross House =

House in Philadelphia, Pennsylvania

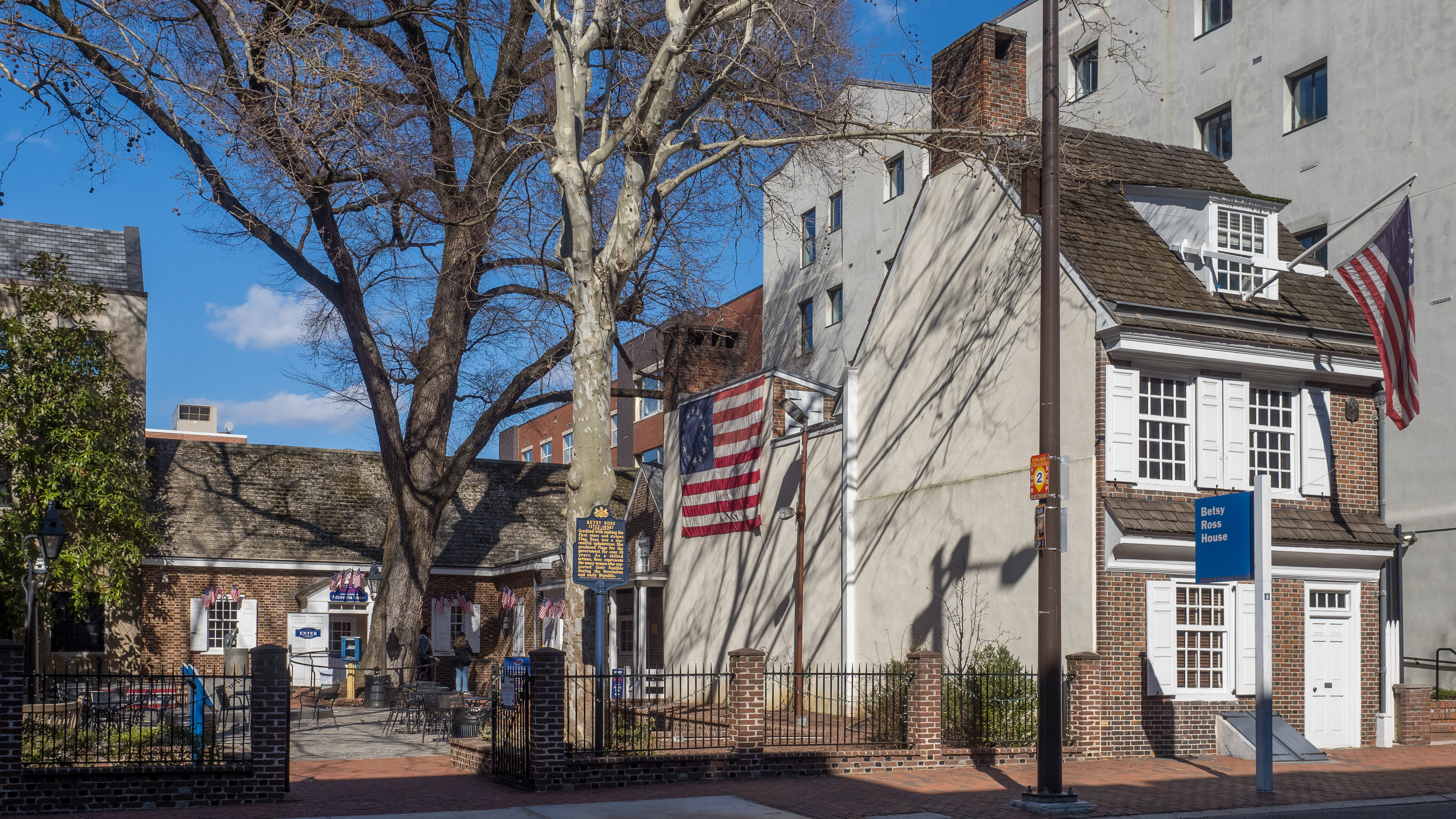
- Betsy Ross House in 2024

- Location within Pennsylvania
- Location: 239 Arch Street, Philadelphia, Pennsylvania, U.S.
- Coordinates: 39°57′08″N 75°08′41″W
- Type: Historic Location
- Presidents: Amy Needle (Historic Philadelphia, Inc.)
- Chairpersons: William H. Haines, IV (Historic Philadelphia, Inc.)
- Public transit access: SEPTA bus: 5, 48, 57
- Website: historicphiladelphia.org/betsy-ross-house/what-to-see/

The Betsy Ross House is a landmark in Philadelphia. It is purported to be the site where the upholsterer and flag-maker Betsy Ross (1752–1836) lived when she is said to have sewed the first American flag.

== History ==
The origins of the Betsy Ross myth trace back to her relatives, particularly her grandsons, William and George Canby, and the celebrations of the Centennial of 1876.

Evidence for the precise location of Ross's home came from verification provided by several surviving family members, although the best archival evidence indicates the house would have been adjacent to the one that still stands today as The Betsy Ross House. The 1937 Philadelphia Guide noted that, after the current Betsy Ross House was selected as the Flag House, the adjacent building where Ross may have indeed lived "was torn down to lessen the hazards of fire, perhaps adding a touch of irony to what may well have been an error in research."

Although the house is one of the most visited tourist sites in Philadelphia, the claim that Ross once lived there, and that she designed and sewed the first American flag, sometimes called the Betsy Ross flag, are subjects of controversy among historians.

The house sits on Arch Street, several blocks from Independence Hall and the Liberty Bell in Philadelphia. The front part of the building was built around 1740, in the Pennsylvania colonial style, with the stair hall and the rear section added 10 to 20 years later. Had she lived here, Ross would have resided in the house from 1776, the death of her first husband, John Ross, until about 1779.

== Restoration ==
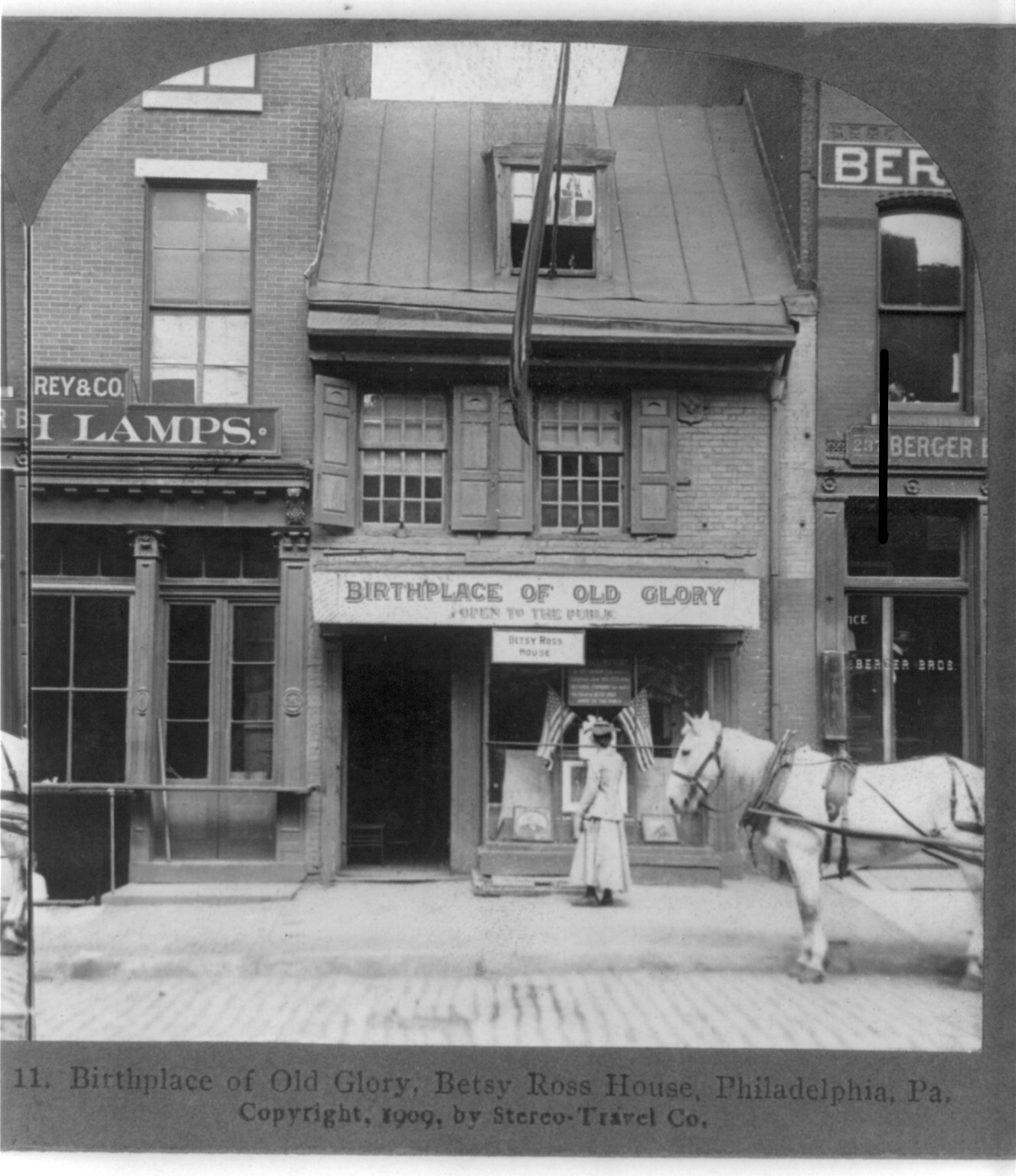
The "Birthplace of Old Glory", a 1909 photograph of Betsy Ross House

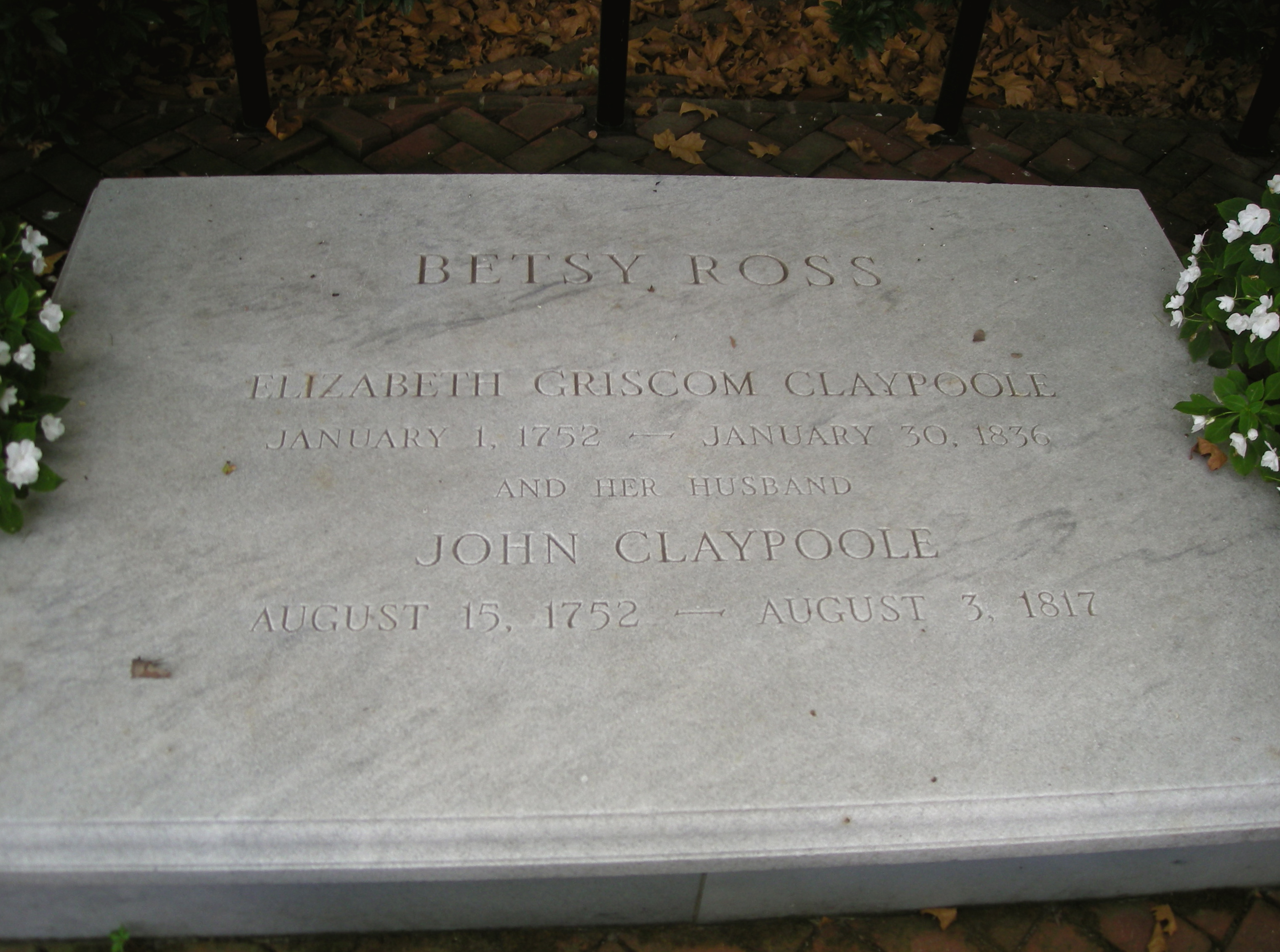
The gravestone of Betsy Ross and her third husband John Claypoole in the Betsy Ross House complex

Over the years, various structural changes and general wear and tear left the house in dire need of restoration. In 1937, Philadelphia radio mogul, A. Atwater Kent offered up to $25,000 for the restoration of the house and commissioned historical architect Richardson Brognard Okie to do the work. Original elements were kept wherever possible. Otherwise, materials from demolished period homes were used. A new structure was added in the rear, made from period bricks. The front stairway and dormer were entirely replaced. The front doorway was moved to the opposite corner, and a new window was installed.

Kent then purchased the two adjacent properties to develop a "civic garden." In 1941, the entire property, including the historic house and courtyard, were given to the city of Philadelphia. In 1965, an annex building was added to the property, and in 1974 the courtyard was renovated and a fountain added.

In preparation for the United States Bicentennial, remains deemed to be those of Ross and her third husband, John Claypoole, were moved to graves in the courtyard. A private nonprofit organization, Historic Philadelphia, Inc., began leasing the property from the City of Philadelphia in 1995 and continues to manage the site.

The Betsy Ross House has long been the site of Philadelphia's observance of Flag Day.

== See also ==
- Independence Hall
- Liberty Bell
