= Bassetlaw =

Bassetlaw may refer to:

- Bassetlaw (UK Parliament constituency), Nottinghamshire constituency in the British House of Commons
- Bassetlaw District General Hospital, a National Health Service hospital in Worksop, Nottinghamshire
- Bassetlaw District, a local government district in the county of Nottinghamshire, England
- Bassetlaw Museum, Retford
- Bassetlaw Wapentake
- Stagecoach in Bassetlaw, Stagecoach East Midlands operations in the Bassetlaw district

== See also ==
- Bassetlaw by-election (disambiguation)
