= Frank Lockwood (politician) =

English lawyer and Liberal Party politician

Sir Frank Lockwood QC
- Frank Lockwood c.1890

Member of Parliament for York
- In office 18 December 1885 – 18 December 1897 Serving with Alfred Pease (1885–1892); John Butcher (1892–1897)
- Preceded by: Frederick Milner; Ralph Creyke
- Succeeded by: John Butcher; Charles Beresford

Personal details
- Born: 15 July 1846 Doncaster, Yorkshire, England
- Died: 18 December 1897 (aged 51) London, County of London, England
- Party: Liberal

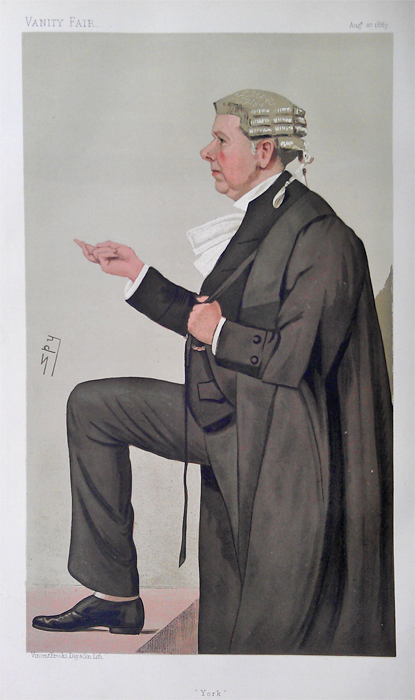
"York". Caricature by Spy published in Vanity Fair in 1887.

Sir Frank Lockwood, QC (15 July 1846 – 18 December 1897) was an English lawyer and Liberal Party politician who sat in the House of Commons as MP for City of York from 1885 to 1897.

== Life ==
Lockwood was born in Doncaster, the son of Charles Day Lockwood. His great-grandfather Joseph Lockwood (c. 1758–1837) was twice mayor of Doncaster, and his grandfather was for many years judge on the racecourse. Lockwood was educated at a private school, at Manchester Grammar School, and Caius College, Cambridge.

Lockwood was called to the bar at Lincoln's Inn in 1872, and joined the old midland circuit, afterwards going to the north-eastern, making in his first year 120 guineas and in the next 265 guineas. From that time he had a career of uninterrupted success, a high-profile brief being the defence of the murderer Charles Peace in 1879. In 1880 he was a member of a Royal Commission to enquire into Corrupt Practices at Chester. He was made a Queen's Counsel in 1882 and in 1884 he was made recorder of Sheffield.

Lockwood made two unsuccessful attempts to enter parliament, the one at King's Lynn at the 1880 general election, the other at York at by-election in 1883. He was elected Liberal Member of Parliament (MP) for York at the 1885 general election and held the seat until his death in 1897. In 1894 he became solicitor-general in Lord Rosebery's ministry, and was knighted. He was solicitor-general for less than a year. During this period he prosecuted the murderer James Canham Read.

In May 1895 Lockwood was lead counsel for the prosecution in Regina v. Oscar Wilde. The Liberal government seemed determined to secure a successful prosecution. Edward Carson, who had successfully defended the Marquess of Queensberry against Wilde's misguided criminal libel, approached Frank Lockwood and asked "Can we not let up on the fellow now?". Lockwood answered that he would like to do so, but feared that the case had become too politicised to be dropped.

In 1896 Lockwood accompanied Lord Chief Justice Russell and barrister Montague Hughes Crackanthorpe to the United States to attend the nineteenth meeting of the American Bar Association as specially invited representatives of the English bar. On the trip he sustained the reputation which he enjoyed in England as a humorous after-dinner speaker, and helped to strengthen the bond of friendship between the bench and bar of the United States and the bench and bar of England.

Lockwood's uncle Henry Francis Lockwood was an architect and his father a talented draughtsman. Lockwood also had a skill at drawing, which he used to amuse himself and his friends, by making caricatures in pen and ink, and sketches of humorous incidents, real or imaginary, relating to the topic nearest at hand. He illustrated C. J. Darling's Scintillae Juris in 1889 and contributed to Punch from 1893 to 1897. An exhibition of his work was held in London in March 1889. He was also author of The Law and Lawyers of Pickwick published in 1894.

Lockwood lived at Cober Hill, Cloughton, near Scarborough, North Yorkshire. He died in London at the age of 51.

Lockwood married Julia Rosetta Salis Schwabe, daughter of Salis and Julia Schwabe of Manchester and Glyn-y-Garth, Anglesey, on 3 September 1874. His wife was the sister of fellow MP George Salis-Schwabe and the daughter of the educationalist Julia Schwabe.

Lockwood was the brother-in-law of the 21st MacLean of Lochbuie and there is a small island off the coast of Mull in Scotland near Lochbuie named after him.

== Notes ==
Parliament of the United Kingdom
Preceded by Sir Frederick Milner; Ralph Creyke	Member of Parliament for York; 1885–1897; With: Alfred Pease 1885–1892; John Butcher 1892–1897	Succeeded by Admiral Lord Charles Beresford; John Butcher
Legal offices
Preceded by Sir Robert Reid	Solicitor General; 1894–1895	Succeeded by Sir Robert Finlay
