= Hector Reaganach Maclean, 1st Laird of Lochbuie =

Eachann Reaganach Maclean, 1st Laird of Lochbuie or Hector Reaganach Maclean or Hector the Stern, was the first Laird and the founder of the Macleans of Lochbuie, Mull.

== Biography ==
Hector Reaganach Maclean or Hector the Stern, was the first laird and the founder of the Macleans of Lochbuie. He was a son of John Dubh MacLean, 4th Clan Chief. He was a noted warrior in his day, and between him and his brother Lachlan always existed a strong affection, and were never separated in their warlike expeditions. Some of his exploits have already been noticed.

It is related that when Hector went to Lochbuie he found the lands possessed by the chief of MacFadyean, and obtained permission to build a fort or keep at the head of Lochbuie. When it was completed Hector ascended to the top, and, taking a bow and arrow, took aim at a bone MacFadyean was then eating from, and pierced it with the arrow. MacFadyean simply remarked," It is time I was leaving" took his departure, and gave Hector no trouble.

It is possible that Hector built in part Moy Castle. In the lower part it bears marks of a high antiquity, and at the time it was possessed by Hector may have been in a ruined condition. It is now one of the best preserved castles in the Hebrides, and until within the last few years its roof was kept entire. It is located on a low rock nearly midway across the head of the bay, and at high tide its base is washed by the sea. For the most part it is built of flat stones, thoroughly cemented together, being broadest at the base. The gate or door-way faces the north, and was formerly protected by a fosse. The gateway is protected by a wooden door, which swings inward; and in turn is guarded by an iron grating on hinges, which again is secured by a wooden beam built into the wall, which may be moved at will, but can not be taken out of the wall. In the wall, to the west, is a recess, where the gateman was constantly stationed. The floor of the interior of the first story is a solid rock, in the center of which is a basin four feet in depth, which is always full of water, but never overflows. Where the water comes from is unknown. In the east wall is a passage-way leading to the stairs, which passes through the east wall to the south-east corner of the second story. From that point upward the stairway is spiral, all of the steps composed of stone. Over the first passage-way, and in the wall, is the vault which held the dead during the funeral obsequies. The second and third floors are formed of solid stone arches. The second story was the judgment hall, and just off from it, and within the east wall, is the chapel, which is reached by a door-way from the spiral stairs. In the south-west corner is the dungeon, which extends from the second floor down to the level of the ground floor. It does not admit of a ray of light, and so constructed as to contain water, and on the floor is placed a single stone, upon which the prisoner must stand, or else drown. Where the water comes from is unknown. There is an escape to prevent an overflow. The third floor was the banqueting hall. The fourth and fifth stories had their floors composed of wood. Here chimneys, fireplaces, and windows may be seen. On the summit, at the north side, is a parapet, where a watchman was constantly on duty. The height of the castle is fifty-five feet, and on the north and the south sides the walls, on the exterior, are thirty-two feet; on the east and west sides, thirty-seven feet. At all places the walls are seven feet in thickness. Hector Reaganach received his charter from the Lord of the Isles, and hence was feudally independent of Duard.

== Marriage and children ==
He married Christina, daughter of Malcolm MacLeod of Glenelg and Harris. He had six sons:

- Charles, settled in Glen Urquhart, Murdoch Maclean, 2nd Laird of Lochbuie, Donald, Ewen, Thomas, and Malcolm.

== Death ==
The date of his death is not preserved.
