= George Leeman =

19th-century English lawyer, railwayman and politician

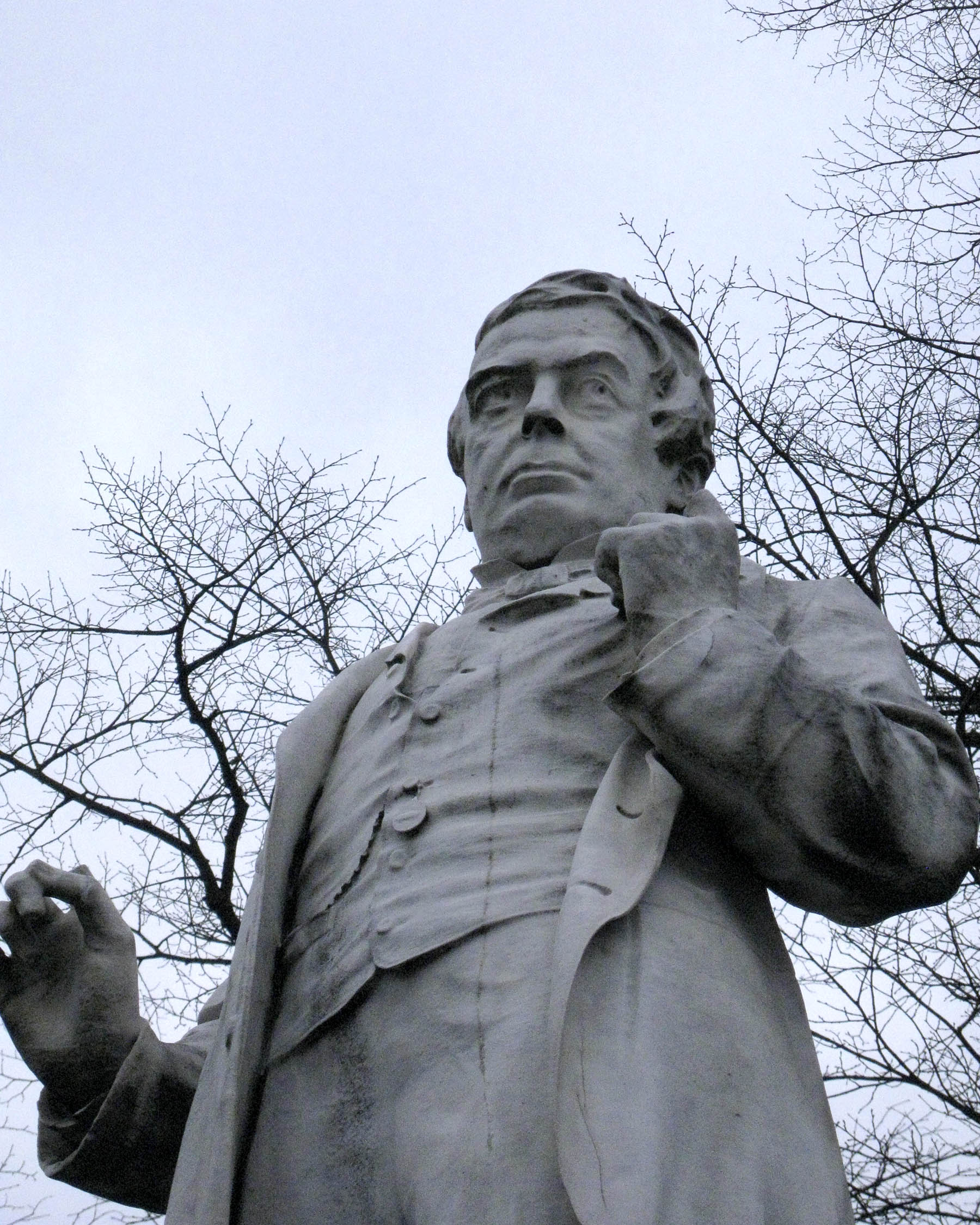
- A statue of Leeman in York

Lord Mayor of York
- In office 1870–1871
- Preceded by: John Colburn
- Succeeded by: William Walker
- In office 1860–1861
- Preceded by: Richard Evers
- Succeeded by: William Fox Clark
- In office 1853–1854
- Preceded by: Richard Evers
- Succeeded by: George Wilson

Member of Parliament for York
- In office 11 July 1865 – 17 November 1868
- Preceded by: Joshua Westhead
- Succeeded by: Joshua Westhead
- In office 14 February 1871 – 31 March 1880
- Preceded by: Joshua Westhead
- Succeeded by: Joseph Johnson Leeman

Personal details
- Born: August 1809 York, Yorkshire, England
- Died: 25 February 1882 (aged 72) Scarborough, Yorkshire, England
- Party: Liberal

George Leeman (August 1809 – 25 February 1882) was a lawyer, railwayman and a Liberal Member of Parliament (MP) for the City of York in the nineteenth century.

== Work ==
=== Legal practice ===
Leeman was articled to Robert Henry Anderson's legal practice, and established a legal practice in York in 1835 when he qualified as a solicitor. He became a senior partner in Leeman & Wilkinson of York and Beverley. He was Clerk of the Peace for the East Riding of Yorkshire from 1845 (and a member of the Society of Clerks of the Peace from November 1849) and a deputy lieutenant for the North Riding.

=== Railwayman ===
"I know nothing comparable in the history of science to that triumphant march —for such it was— when the Liverpool and Manchester Railway was opened."

— George Leeman

In 1849 he became chairman of the York, Newcastle and Berwick Railway, succeeding his rival the 'Railway King' George Hudson after Leeman's investigations helped uncover Hudson's illegal share dealing. Leeman was deputy chairman of the successor company, the North Eastern Railway, from 1855 to 1874 and chairman from 1874 to 1880, having encouraged its formation through mergers in 1854, and he was a chairman of the Railway Association of Great Britain. Leeman resigned as chairman of the NER in 1880 after the failure of his mining company reduced his wealth and harmed his health. He remained a member of the board until his death two years later.

=== Other business ===
He was involved the 1860s in developing iron ore mining at Rosedale for Teesside steel works, co-owning the Rosedale and Ferryhill Iron Company from 1860 to 1877. He was a director of the York Herald and chairman of the Yorkshire Banking Company from 1867 to 1880.

== Political career ==
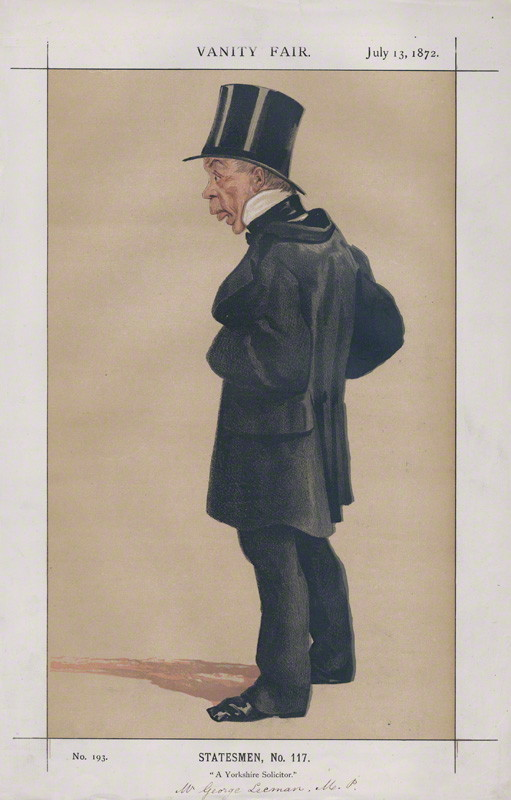
A caricature of Leeman in Vanity Fair in 1872

He became a Liberal councillor for Castlegate Ward in 1836 and for Guildhall Ward in 1839, and was an Alderman for 28 years from 1850. He was elected Lord Mayor of York three times in 1853, 1860, 1870, and was the member of parliament for York 1865–8 and 1871–80, having first stood for Parliament in 1852. When Anthony Trollope campaigned in Beverley as a Liberal candidate, Leeman warned him against it; Trollope came last due to corruption and vote-buying.

== Personal life ==
Leeman was born in York, the son of George Leeman, a greengrocer. He lived at The Mount, York, and married twice, first to Jane Johnson in 1835, and second to Eliza, the widow of Rev. Charles Payton, in 1863. One son, William Luther Leeman, attended St. Edmund Hall, Cambridge, and University College, Durham, and was Rector of Middleton St. George, 1874–6, Vicar of Rosedale, Yorkshire, 1877–9, and of Seaforth, Lancashire, 1879–82. His second son, Joseph Johnson Leeman (1842 – 2 November 1883), became a partner in Leeman and Wilkinson and succeeded George as MP for York. Another son, Francis Lawley Leeman (born 19 July 1854, died 1883), attended Westminster School and Trinity College, Cambridge. George also had at least three daughters, including Priscilla.

He was a member of the Reform Club and the Yorkshire Philosophical Society from 1844. He died in Scarborough in 1882. A statue of Leeman by local sculptor George Walker Milburn, paid for by public subscription, was unveiled in 1885 and stands outside York railway station; Station Road was renamed Leeman Road at the same time.

Parliament of the United Kingdom
Preceded by Joshua Westhead; John George Smyth	Member of Parliament for City of York; 1865–1868; With: James Lowther	Succeeded by Joshua Westhead; James Lowther
Parliament of the United Kingdom
Preceded by Joshua Westhead; James Lowther	Member of Parliament for City of York; 1871–1880; With: James Lowther	Succeeded by Joseph Johnson Leeman; Ralph Creyke
Business positions
Preceded by Sir Harry Meysey-Thompson, Bart	Chairman of the North Eastern Railway; 1874–1880	Succeeded by John Dent Dent
