= Robert Laycock (MP) =

English Liberal Party politician

Robert Laycock (1833 – 14 August 1881) was a Liberal Party politician.

== Early life and education ==
Laycock was born in Winlaton, County Durham, to Joseph Laycock of Wiseton Hall and his first wife, Barbara Nicholson. His father was a wealthy colliery owner. Laycock was educated in Durham and Trinity College, Cambridge.

== Career ==
Laycock was elected Liberal MP for North Lincolnshire in 1880, but died just over a year later. He had also previously contested North Nottinghamshire in February 1872 and Nottingham in 1874.

== Personal life ==
In 1866, Laycock married Annie Allhusen, second daughter of Christian Allhusen. They had a son, Sir Joseph Laycock (1867–1952), and a daughter, Alice Barbara (1868–1952), who married Edward Alfred Mitchell-Innes, son of Gilbert Mitchell-Innes.

Laycock died suddenly in August 1881 while visiting Eastbourne, Sussex. He arrived in Eastbourne and complained of stomach pain, and died the following morning. He died 12 days after his father. His widow later remarried Lord D'Arcy Godolphin Osborne, son of George Osborne, 8th Duke of Leeds.

Parliament of the United Kingdom
| Preceded by Rowland Winn; John Dugdale Astley | Member of Parliament for North Lincolnshire; 1880–1881; With: Rowland Winn | Succeeded by Rowland Winn; James Lowther |
