= James Stanhope (MP) =

British Conservative politician

James Stanhope MP
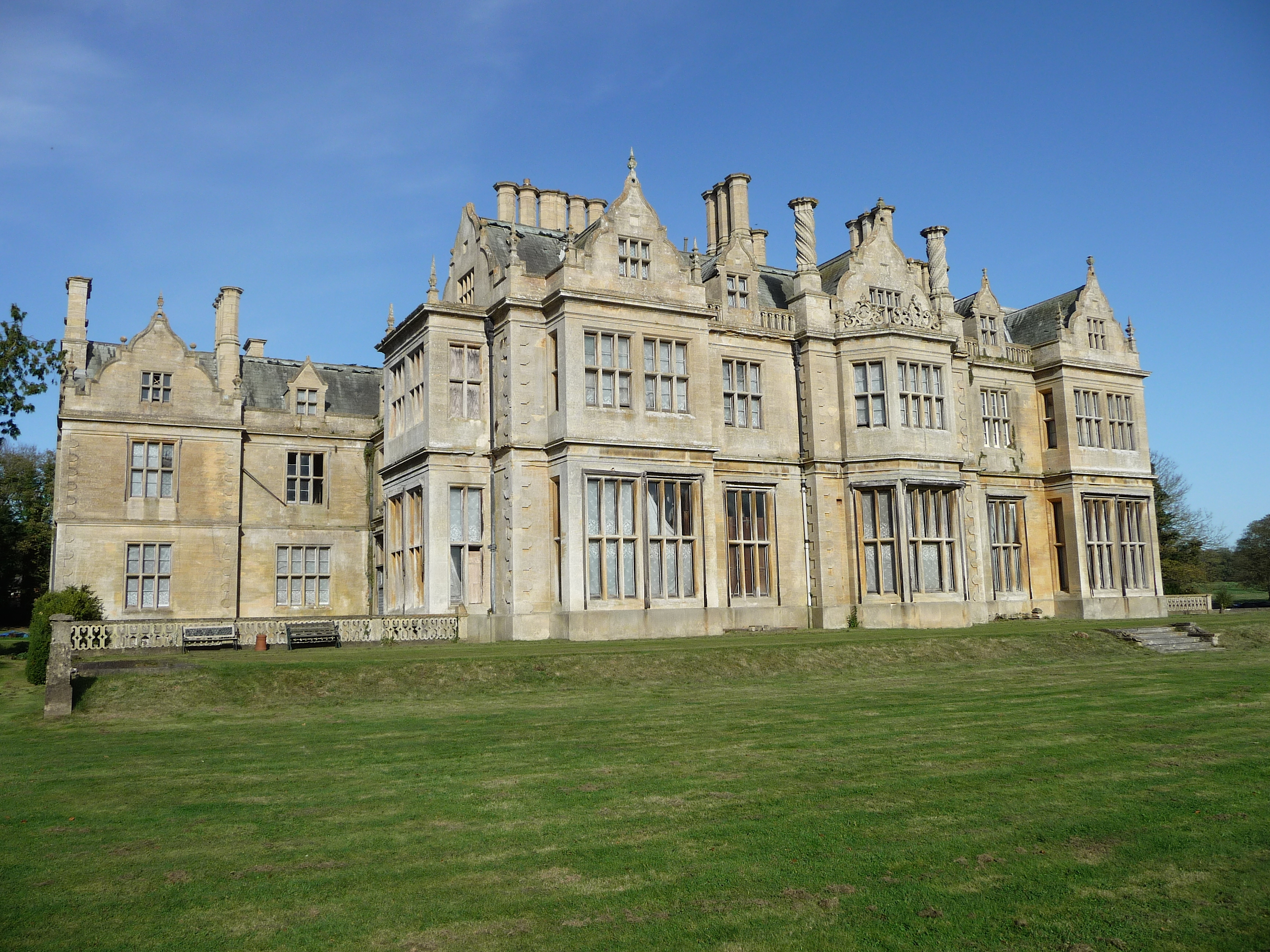

Member of Parliament for North Lincolnshire
- In office 16 July 1852 – 16 November 1868 Serving with Montague Cholmeley (1857–1868); Robert Christopher (1852–1857)
- Preceded by: Montague Cholmeley; Robert Christopher
- Succeeded by: Montague Cholmeley; Rowland Winn

Personal details
- Born: 13 May 1821
- Died: 18 January 1904 (aged 82)
- Party: Conservative
- Relations: Joseph Banks
- Parent(s): James Hamilton Stanhope; Lady Frederica-Louisa Murray

James Banks Stanhope (13 May 1821 – 18 January 1904) was a British Conservative Party politician.

== Family ==
Stanhope was the son of former MP and British Army officer the Hon. James Hamilton Stanhope and Lady Frederica-Louisa Murray, daughter of David William Murray, 3rd Earl of Mansfield. His father was the youngest son of Charles Stanhope, 3rd Earl Stanhope.

== Revesby Abbey ==
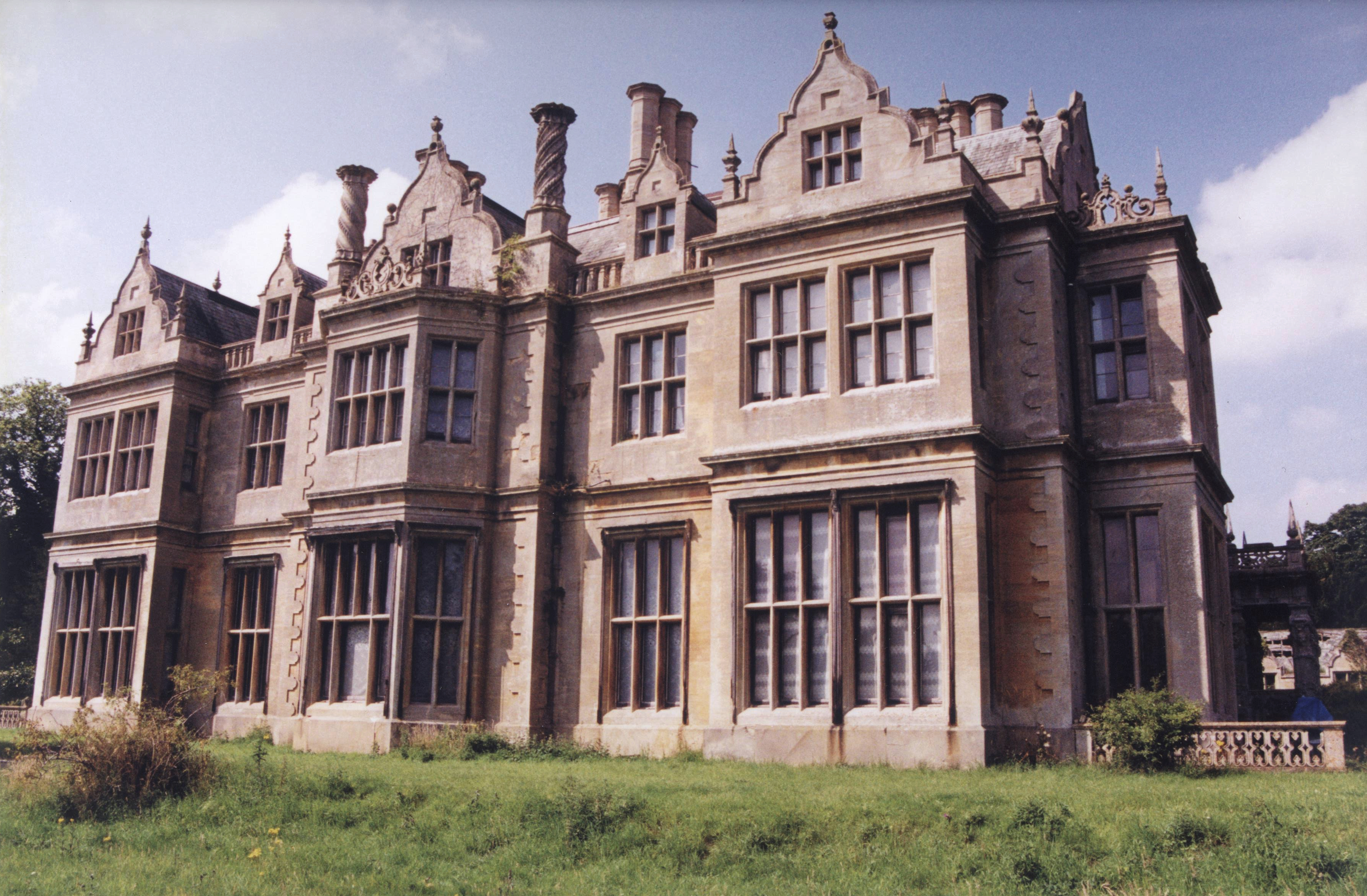
Revesby Abbey in 2001

Stanhope inherited Revesby Abbey in 1823 from his father but did not succeed to the estate until 1842, however, as he was a minor. By the time he succeeded to the estate, it had fallen into disrepair and had been emptied.

In 1843, he commissioned Scottish architect William Burn to redesign the new abbey in a mixture of Jacobean and Elizabethan, also known as Jacobethan. The building was demolished in 1844, with its materials sold at auction, to make way for the abbey's third incarnation.

During this period, new screen gates and a lodge were added on the south boundary. The estate was then completed in 1846 and, following financial losses from the Great Depression of British Agriculture, his estate generated an income of £13,000 a year.

The estate was passed to Stanhope's elected heir who was his first cousin once removed, the Hon. Edward Stanhope.

== Political career ==
He was elected MP for North Lincolnshire in 1852 and held the seat until he stood down in 1868.

Parliament of the United Kingdom
Preceded by Montague Cholmeley; Robert Christopher	Member of Parliament for North Lincolnshire; 1852–1868; With: Montague Cholmeley (1857–1868); Robert Christopher (1852–1857)	Succeeded by Montague Cholmeley; Rowland Winn
