= Frederick Milner =

British politician

Sir Frederick Milner
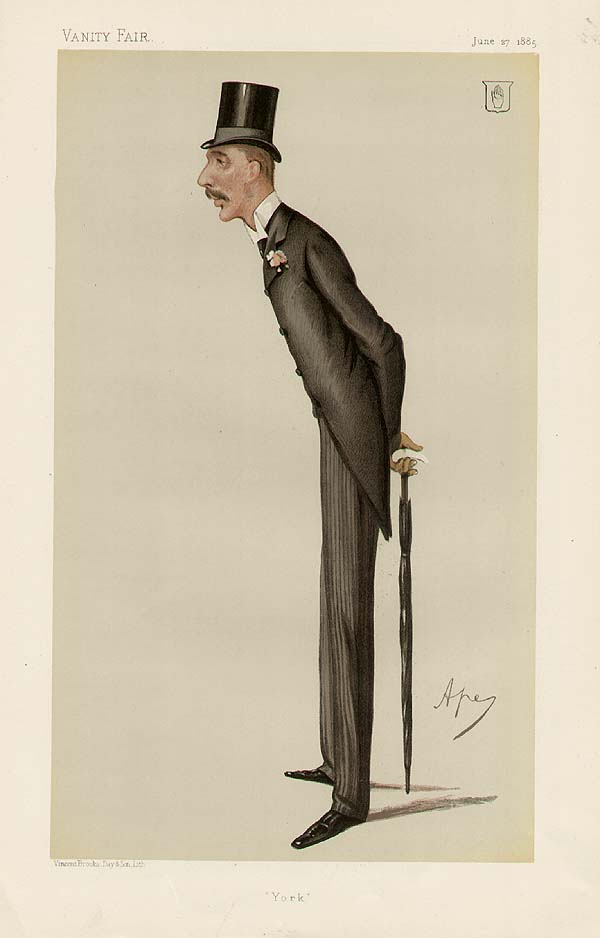
- Caricature by Ape published in Vanity Fair in 1885

Member of Parliament for York
- In office 23 November 1883 – 18 December 1885 Serving with Ralph Creyke
- Preceded by: Joseph Johnson Leeman; Ralph Creyke
- Succeeded by: Alfred Pease; Frank Lockwood

Personal details
- Born: 7 November 1849
- Died: 8 June 1931 (aged 81)
- Party: Conservative
- Spouse: Adeline Gertrude Beckett-Denison (m. 1880, died)
- Parents: William Milner, 5th Baronet (father); Georgiana Lumley (mother)

Sir Frederick George Milner, 7th Baronet, GCVO PC (7 November 1849 – 8 June 1931) was a British Conservative Party politician who sat in the House of Commons from 1883 to 1885, and from 1890 to 1906.

== Personal life ==
Milner was born on 7 November 1849, the second son of William Mordaunt Edward Milner (born 20 June 1820 at Bolton Percy, Yorkshire, died 1867 at age 46), the fifth baronet and his wife Lady Georgiana Anne Lumley (born c 1820 at Tickhill Castle, died 2 February 1877). Milner's father was the Member of Parliament for York between 1848 and 1857.

Milner became the 7th baronet in 1880, after the death of his father and his older brother, the 6th baronet, Sir William Mordaunt Milner at the age of 31 (unmarried, no issue). Frederick Milner was educated at Eton College and matriculated at Christ Church, Oxford in 1868, graduating B.A. in 1873.

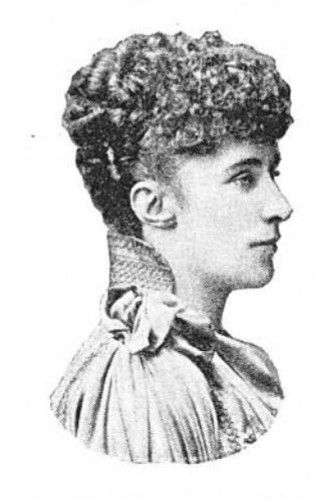
Milner's wife, Adeline, Lady Milner

In 1880, Milner married Adeline Gertrude Denison (1859–1902), second daughter of William Beckett-Denison, by his wife Helen Duncombe, daughter of William Duncombe, 2nd Baron Feversham. They had one son, William Frederick Victor Mordaunt Milner, who succeeded to the baronetcy on his father's death. Lady Milner was a co-founder of the White Heather Club for women's cricket and wrote the chapter on cricket of Violet, Lady Greville's book about sports for gentlewomen. She died on 7 July 1902, at the age of 43, predeceasing her husband by 29 years. Frederick Milner died in June 1931 at the age of 81.

A secondary school for boys, the Sir Frederick Milner Secondary Modern School in Retford, Nottinghamshire was named after him, although this has now been merged into Retford Oaks Academy.

== Political career and honours ==
Milner was elected as one of the two Members of Parliament (MPs) for York at a by-election in 1883, but was defeated at the 1885 general election.

He was returned to the Commons at a by-election in 1890 as the MP for Bassetlaw, and held the seat for 16 years until his defeat at the 1906 general election. Milner then retired from politics due to problems with his hearing, but continued with his work to help ex-servicemen. He was sworn of the Privy Council in 1900.

Milner was also a JP for the West Riding, Yorkshire and a Deputy Lieutenant for the West Riding. He was appointed Knight of Justice, Most Venerable Order of the Hospital of St. John of Jerusalem (K.St.J.) and Knight Grand Cross, Royal Victorian Order (G.C.V.O.) in 1930.

== Marriage and issue ==
On 19 October 1880, Milner married Adeline Gertrude Beckett, daughter of William Beckett-Denison. They had three children:

- Doreen Maud Milner - born in 1886 and died 2 August 1965, married (1911) Victor Alexander John Hope, 2nd Marquess of Linlithgow. Had issue:
- Violet Helen Milner - born 7 June 1883 died 28 November 1919, married Lt. Col. Edward York. Had issue:
- Sir William Frederick Victor Mordaunt Milner, 8th baronet - born 2 October 1893 died 19 March 1960 aged 66 and unmarried. No issue.

After the death of the 8th baronet, the baronetcy passed back to the issue of the 4th Baronet. The 4th baronet's second son Henry Beilby William Milner (born 1823, died 1876) married Charlotte Henrietta Beresford in 1853. He was a JP and lived at West Retford House, Retford, Nottinghamshire but had died long before the baronetcy became vacant. His eldest son Major Edward Milner was also deceased with no issue. His second son Brig Gen George Francis Milner (10 July 1862, died 20 June 1921) had married Phyllis Mary Lycett Green in 1910 and had two sons with her. His eldest son, Sir George Edward Mordaunt Milner (born 7 February 1911, died 18 December 1995) became the 9th baronet in 1960. The ninth baronet married Barbara Audrey Belsham in 1935 with whom he had three children. He relocated his family to South Africa, where the 10th Baronet, Sir Timothy William Lycett Milner (born 1936), now lives. The current baronet has no children and so upon his death the baronetcy will pass to his younger brother's son (the 10th baronet's nephew), Marcus Charles Mordaunt Miller (born 1968), his younger brother having predeceased him in 2015.

Parliament of the United Kingdom
Preceded by Joseph Johnson Leeman; Ralph Creyke	Member of Parliament for City of York; 1883 – 1885; With: Ralph Creyke	Succeeded by Alfred Edward Pease; Frank Lockwood
Preceded by William Beckett-Denison	Member of Parliament for Bassetlaw; 1890 – 1906	Succeeded by Frank Newnes
Baronetage of Great Britain
Preceded by William Mordaunt Milner	Baronet (of Nun Appleton Hall); 1880 – 1931	Succeeded by William Frederick Victor Mordaunt Milner
