= Bassetlaw by-election =

Bassetlaw by-election may refer to:

- 1890 Bassetlaw by-election
- 1968 Bassetlaw by-election
