= Moy Castle =

Castle in Argyll and Bute, Scotland

Coordinates: 56°21′17″N 5°51′33″W

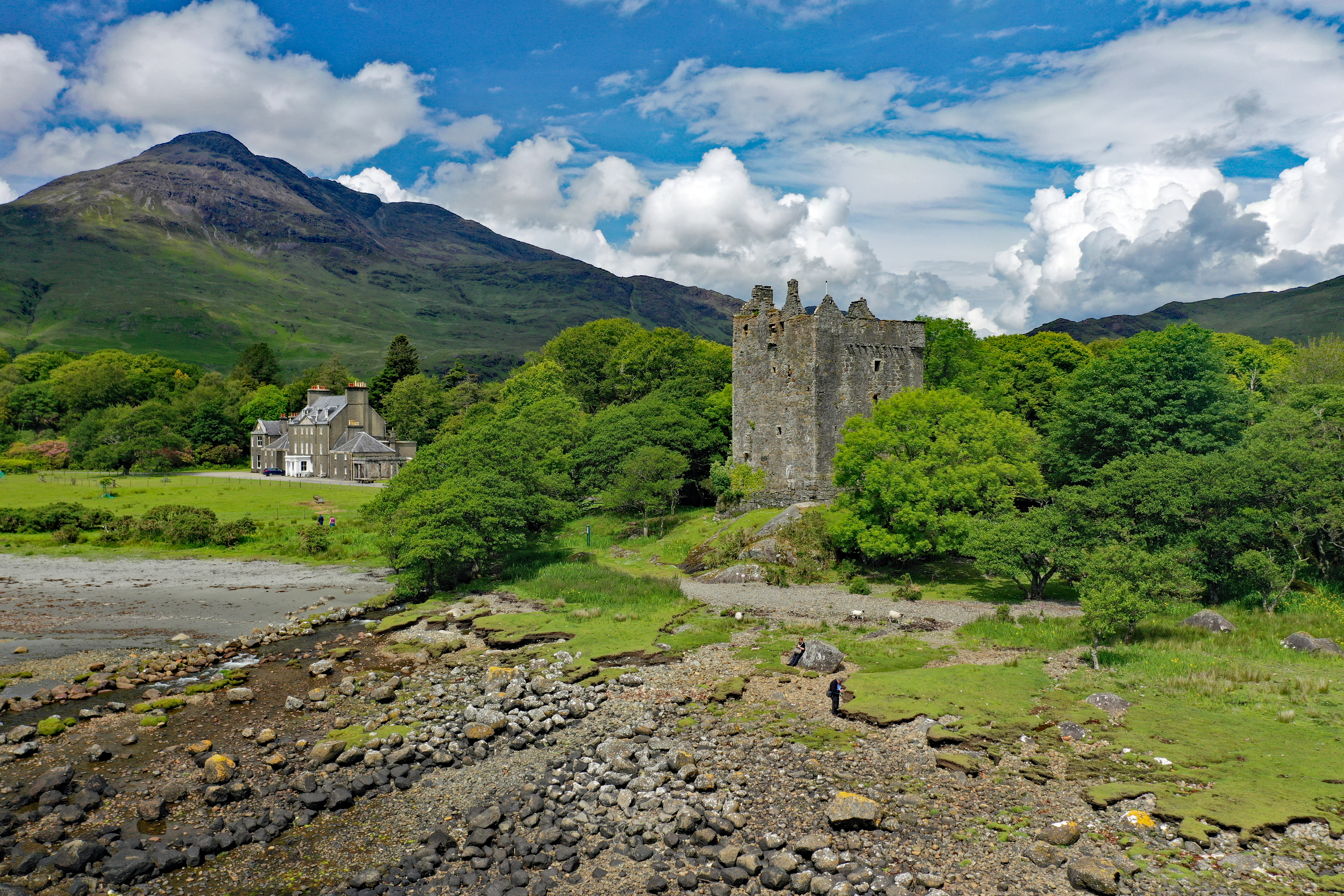
- The castle in 2019
- Interactive map of Moy Castle
- Location: Scotland

Moy Castle is a ruined castle near Lochbuie on the Isle of Mull, Scotland. The site is now a scheduled monument.

== History ==
The land upon which Moy Castle was built was granted to Hector Reaganach Maclean, 1st Laird of Lochbuie, brother of Lachlan Lubanach Maclean of Duart, in 1360. Construction of the castle was probably begun by John Maclean, 3rd Laird, and finished by his son, Hector, the fourth laird. The first surviving mention of the castle is in a royal charter dated March 1494 confirming that John Maclean, 5th Laird, held his lands from the Lord of the Isles. It was captured from the Macleans of Lochbuie by Clan Campbell, but later returned to the Macleans. It was abandoned in 1752 when a new house was built nearby.

== Description ==
The castle comprises a three-storey tower house with a garret. Much of the surviving stonework can be dated to the early 15th century; some alterations and additions can be attributed to the end of the following century. Although missing its roof, the castle's walls are virtually intact up to the height of the gables and parapet. The crenellated parapet and the remains of two cap-houses survive at the upper level. The ground floor contains a well. A small enclosure or barmkin was located on the south east side. Between 2006 and 2015, stabilisation works were carried out to preserve the castle and prevent further decay. As of 2020, conservation work to further stabilise the structure continues.

Moy Castle was used for scenes in Powell and Pressburger's 1945 film I Know Where I'm Going!, along with other locations on Mull.

== Gallery ==
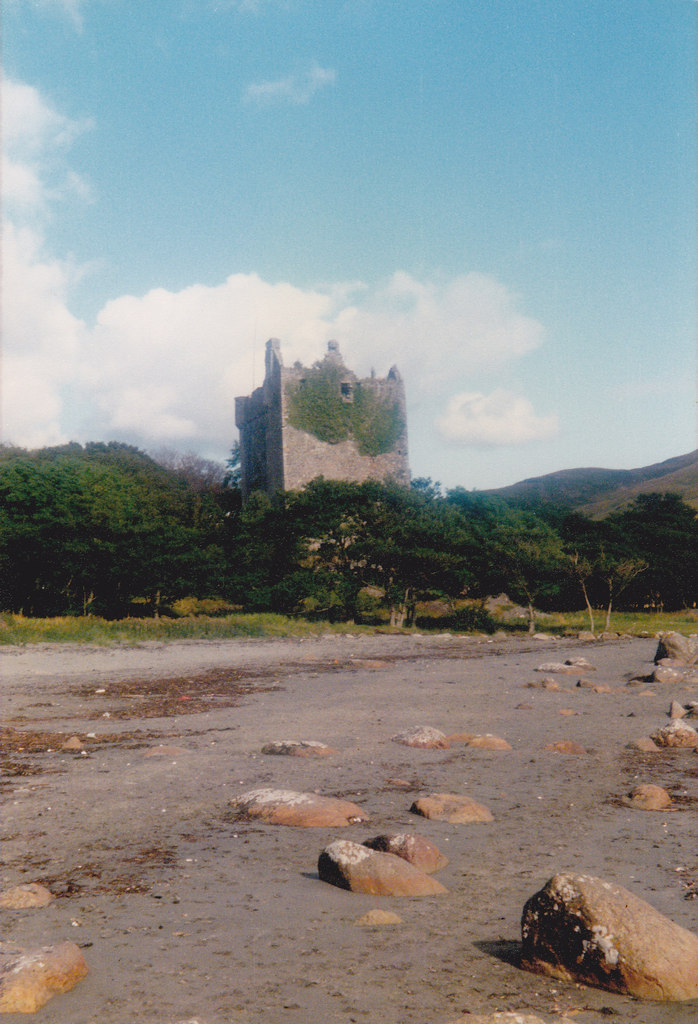
The castle in 1986

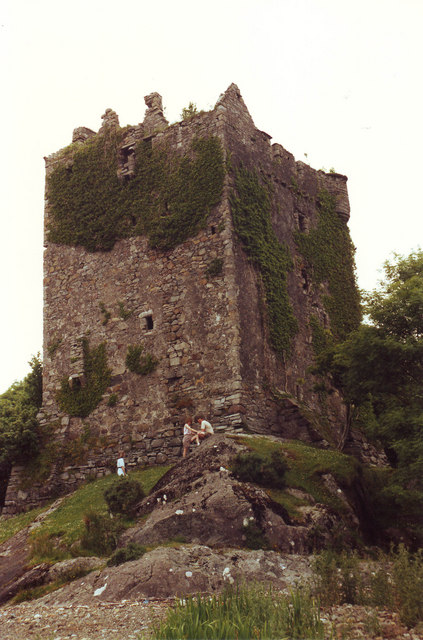
The castle in 1991

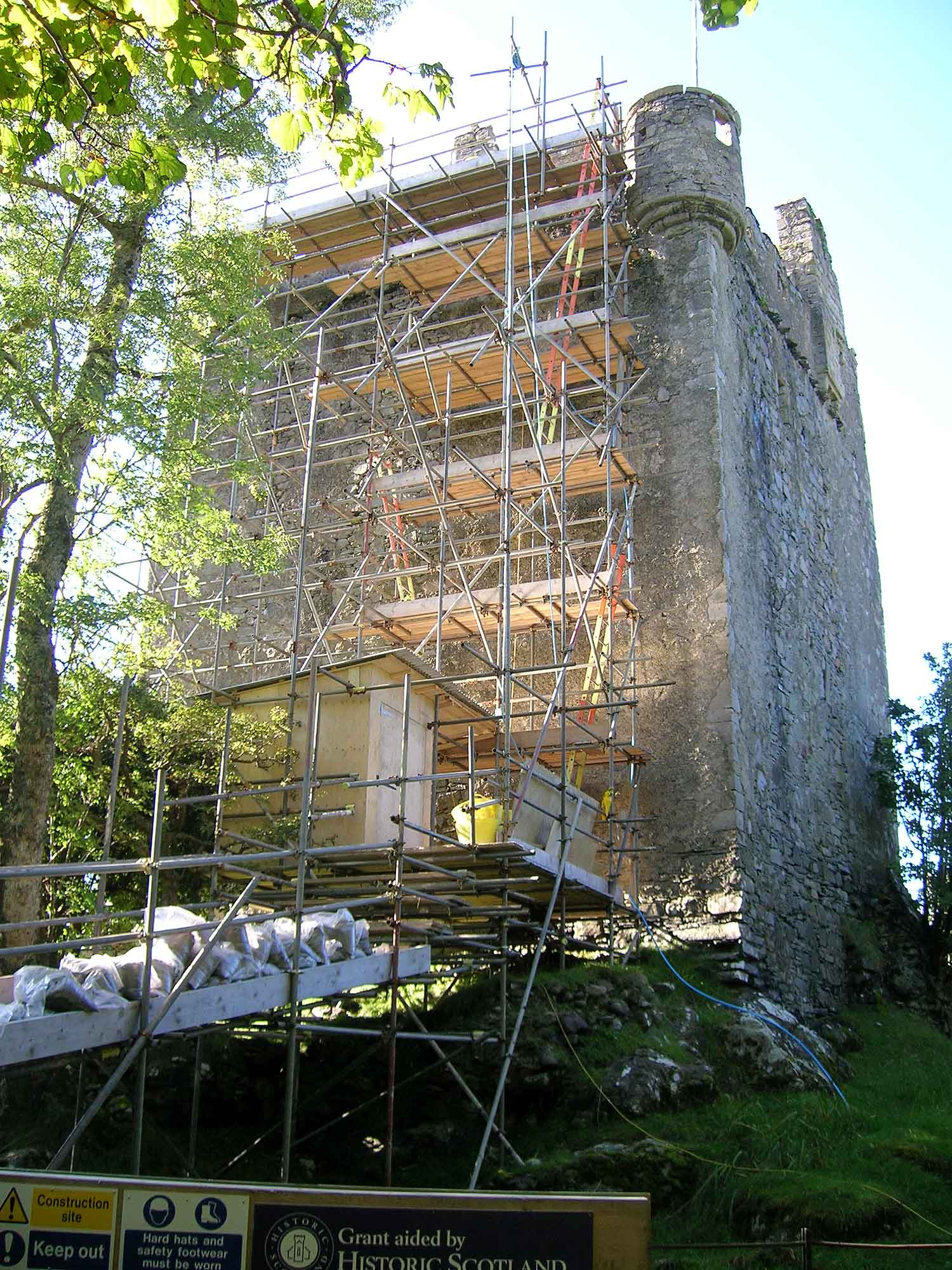
The castle under repairs in 2006

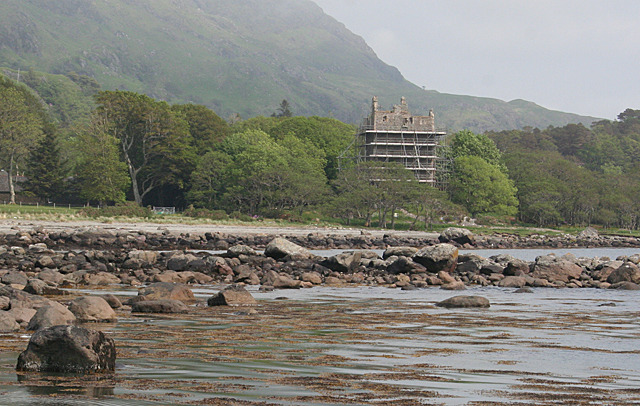
The castle under repairs in 2012

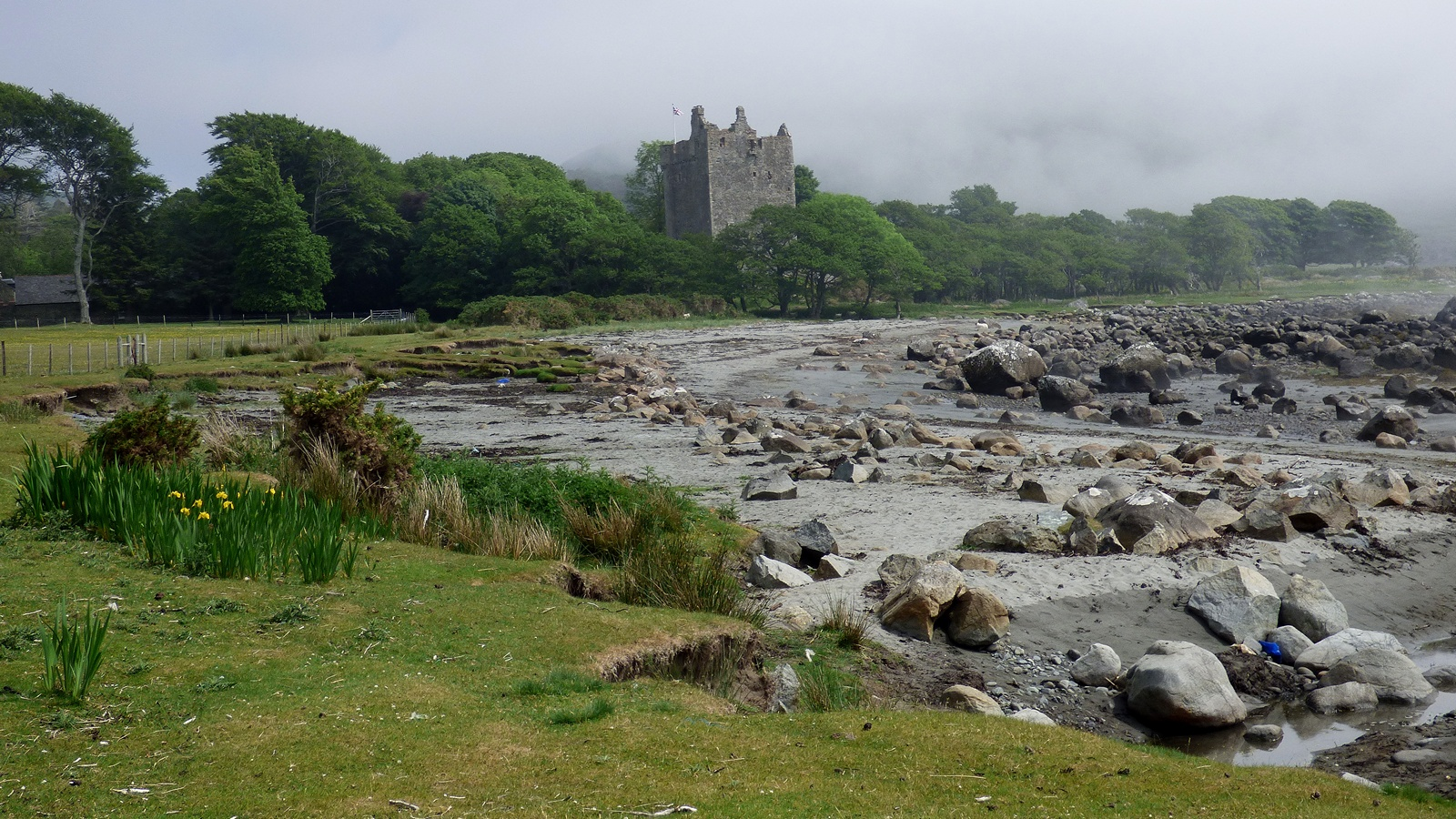
The castle in 2016

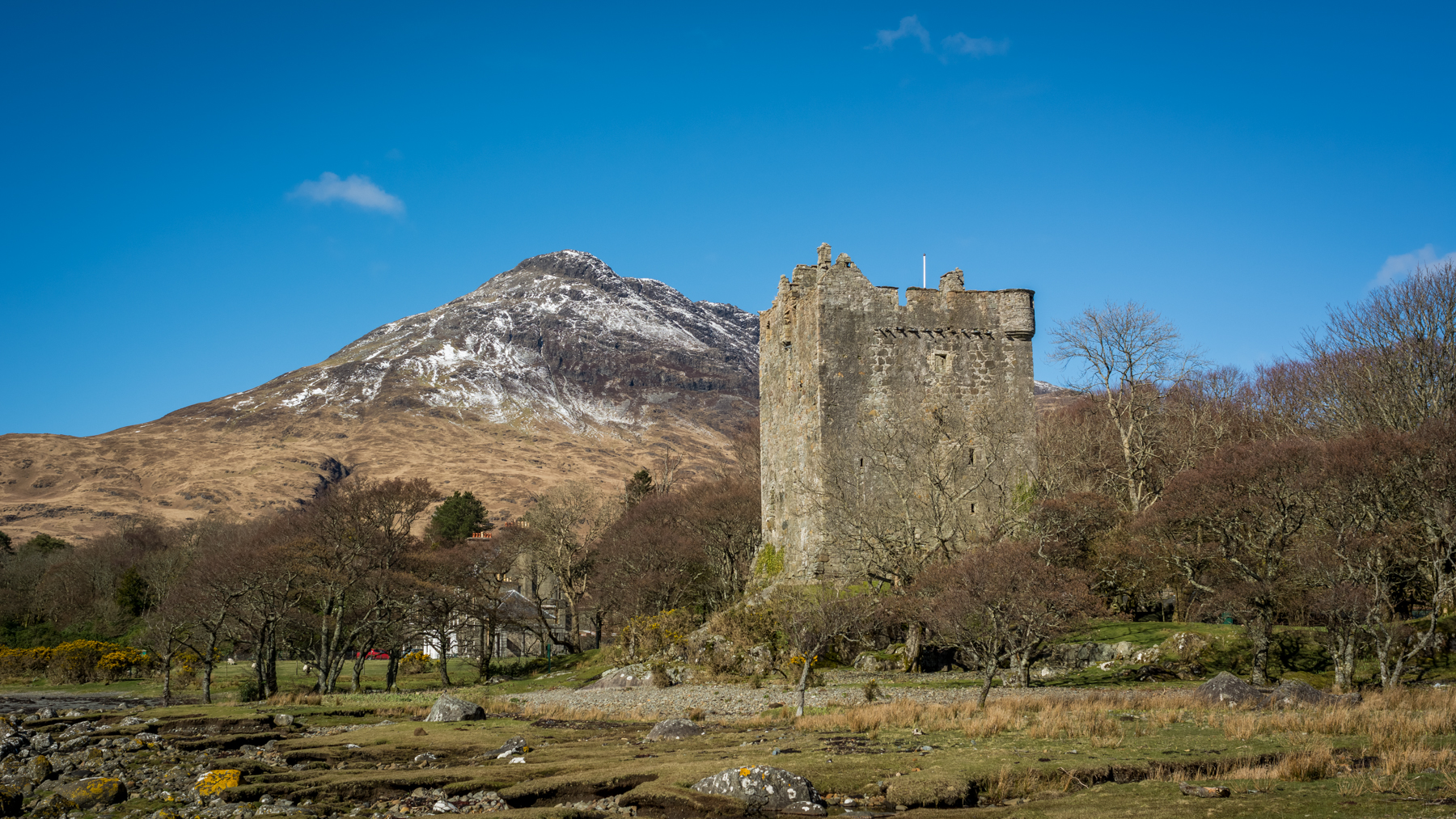
The castle in 2017

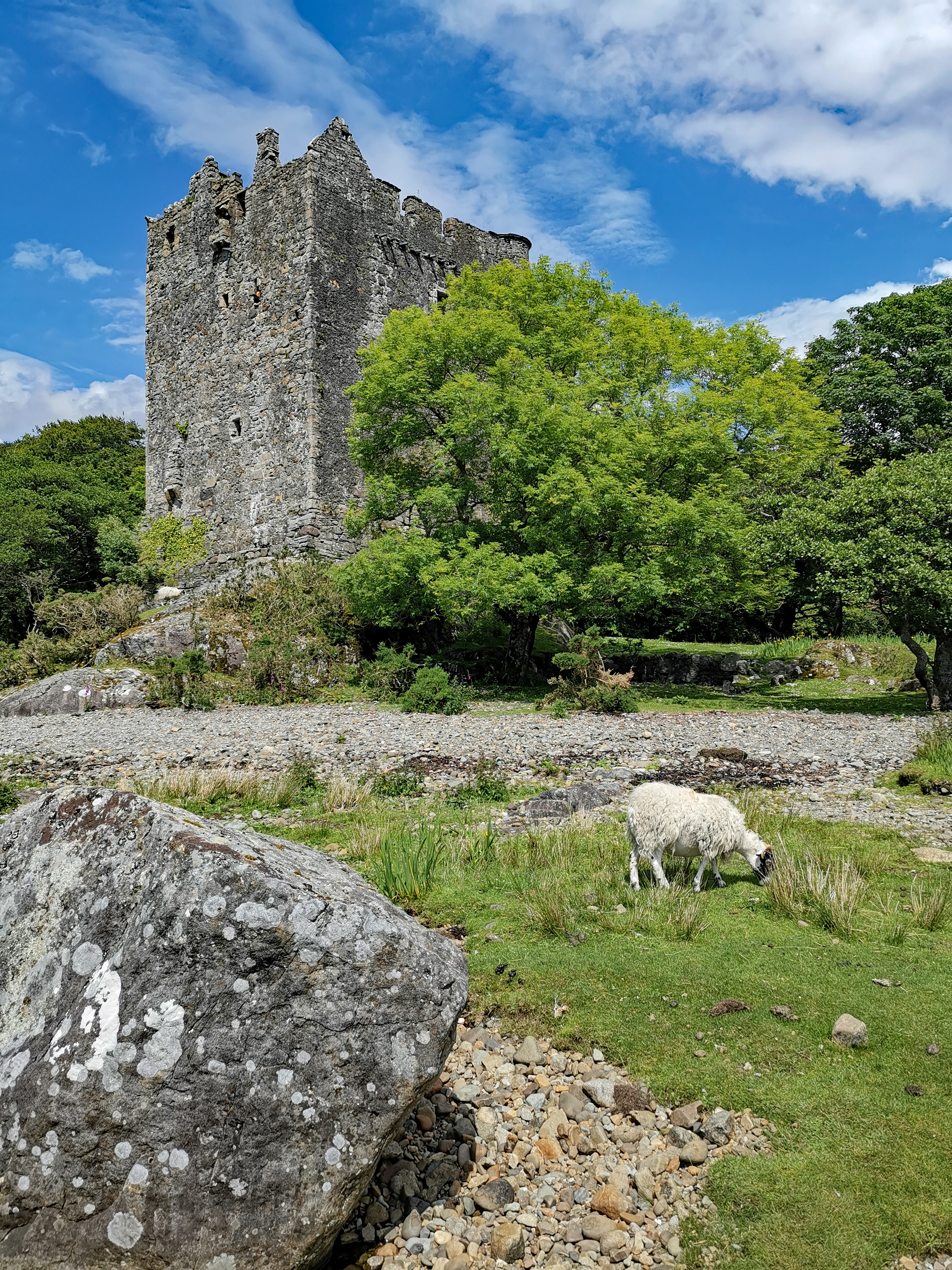
The castle in 2019

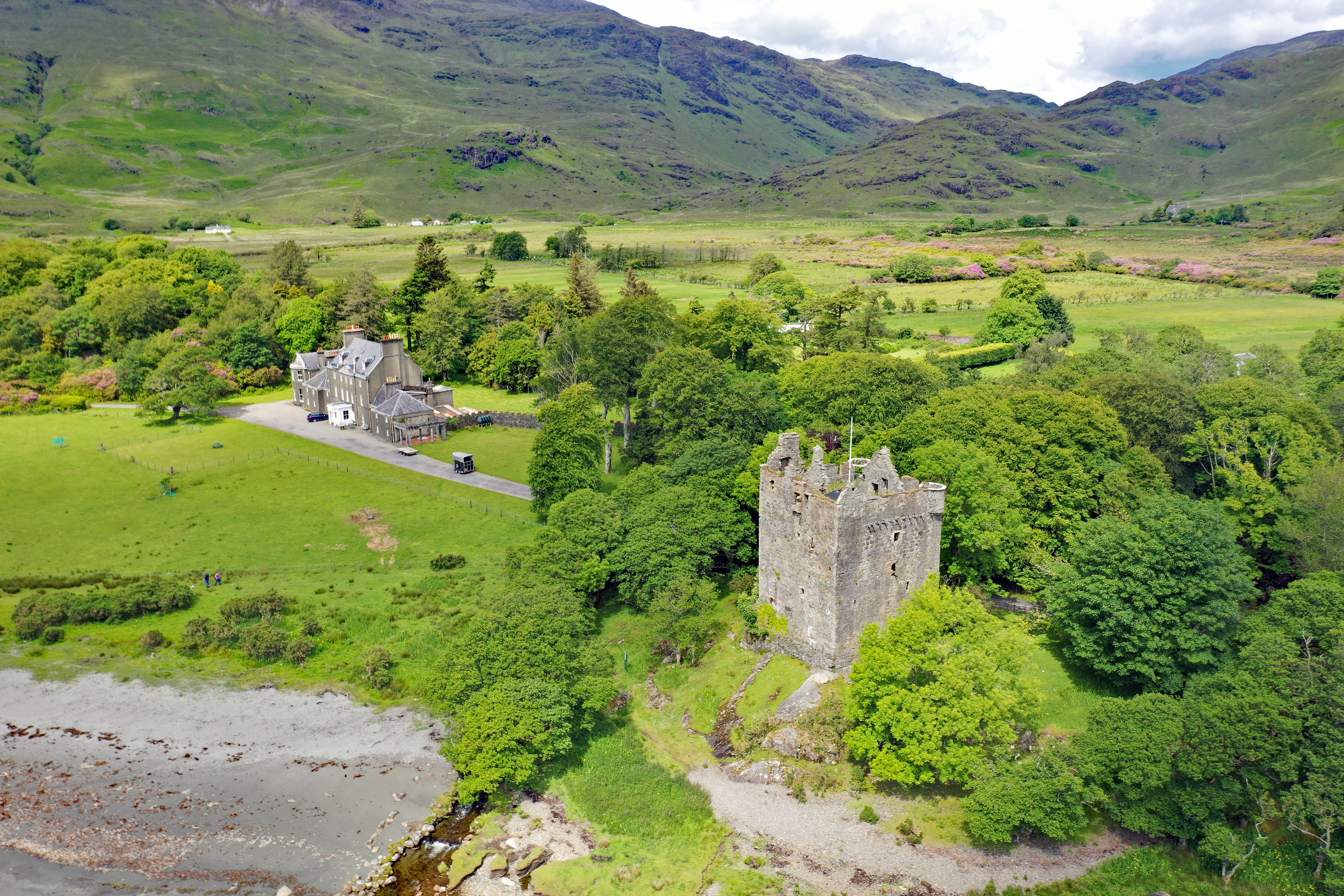
Aerial view in 2019

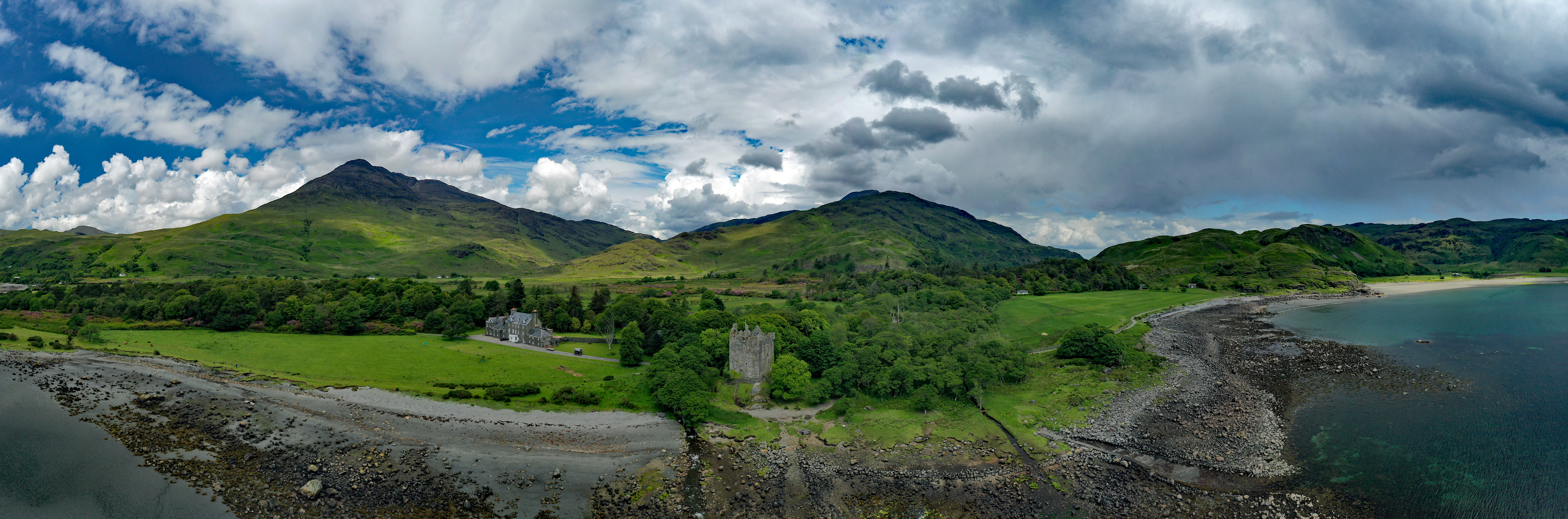
Aerial view in 2019
