= James Lowther (politician, born 1840) =

British politician

The Right Honourable James Lowther PC (Ire) DL JP
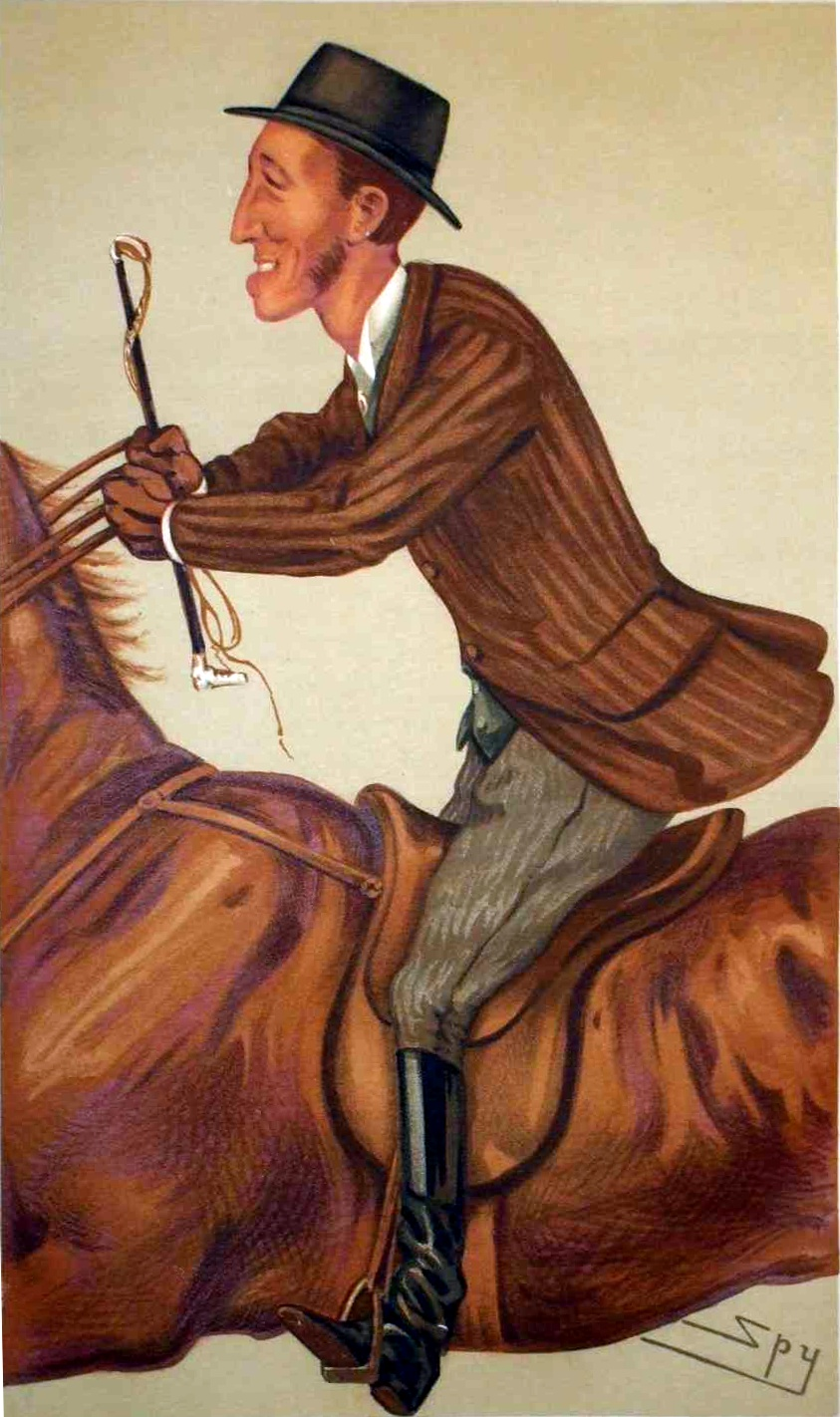
- "Jim"; Lowther as caricatured by Spy (Leslie Ward) in Vanity Fair, December 1877

Under-Secretary of State for the Colonies
- In office 25 February 1874 – 15 February 1878
- Monarch: Victoria
- Prime Minister: Benjamin Disraeli
- Preceded by: Edward Knatchbull-Hugessen
- Succeeded by: The Earl Cadogan

Chief Secretary for Ireland
- In office 15 February 1878 – 21 April 1880
- Monarch: Victoria
- Prime Minister: Benjamin Disraeli
- Preceded by: Sir Michael Hicks-Beach, Bt
- Succeeded by: William Edward Forster

Personal details
- Born: 1 December 1840 Swillington, Yorkshire
- Died: 12 September 1904 (aged 63) Wilton, Yorkshire
- Party: Conservative
- Education: Trinity College, Cambridge

James Lowther PC PC (Ire) DL JP (1 December 1840 – 12 September 1904) was a British Conservative politician and sportsman.

== Background and education ==
Born at Swillington, Yorkshire, Lowther was the younger son of Sir Charles Lowther, 3rd Baronet, of Swillington and Isabella Morehead. He was educated at Westminster School and took a BA from Trinity College, Cambridge in 1863, and an MA in 1866. He was also admitted as a barrister of the Inner Temple on 17 October 1864, but never practised law.

== Political career ==
Lowther first entered Parliament in 1865, as Member of Parliament for York. His maiden speech was against the Reform Bill of 1866, the failure of which brought down the ministry of Lord Russell. He also vehemently opposed the Reform Act 1867, brought forward by Disraeli and Lord Derby, but Disraeli nonetheless appointed him Parliamentary Secretary to the Poor Law Board the same year. He was a strong voice in the opposition to Gladstone, particularly to the Landlord and Tenant (Ireland) Act 1870. With the return to power of Disraeli in 1874, he was appointed Under-Secretary of State for the Colonies. In 1878, he was further advanced to become Chief Secretary for Ireland and sworn of the Privy Council of the United Kingdom and of Ireland. However, he was beset with difficulties during his tenure in the secretaryship. His opposition to the Land Bill was held against him, and he treated with contempt the agitation of the Land League, which would soon break out in the Land War. He went out of office with Disraeli's government in 1880, and lost his seat at York as well.

Lowther cultivated many interests outside politics, and had time to cultivate them while attempting to return to Parliament. He served on several public bodies in Yorkshire and County Durham, he began to breed racehorses in 1873, and regularly ran them at races in the north of England. However, he did not bet on them, and was highly scrupulous in his conduct, becoming a member of the Jockey Club in 1877.

While Lowther was defeated at a by-election in Cumberland East in February 1881, he successfully captured North Lincolnshire in September of that year. Upon his return to the House of Commons, he became known for his arch-conservatism and protectionism. Upon the abolition of the North Lincolnshire constituency in 1885, he stood for Louth, but was defeated, and again in 1886 in Eskdale. He re-entered the house in 1888 at a by-election for the Isle of Thanet. Despite his uncompromising views, he enjoyed general popularity in the House of Commons, and had an excellent command of parliamentary procedure. However, by 1903, he had been forced to give over active Parliamentary work, and sold off his racehorses.

== Lowther estates ==
In 1882, Lowther's third cousin once removed, Hugh Lowther, succeeded as Earl of Lonsdale and to the Lowther estates, of which James was senior trustee. Lonsdale's habits were extravagant, and James was to have great difficulty in restraining his spending, which would ultimately ruin the estate. James himself inherited Wilton Castle upon his father's death in 1894, and took great interest in managing the estate.

== Personal life ==
He died at Wilton on 12 September 1904, and left the castle to his nephew Colonel John George Lowther.

Parliament of the United Kingdom
Preceded by John George Smyth; Joshua Westhead	Member of Parliament for York; 1865–1880; With: George Leeman 1865–1868, 1871–1880; Joshua Westhead 1865–1871	Succeeded by Ralph Creyke; Joseph Johnson Leeman
Preceded by Rowland Winn; Robert Laycock	Member of Parliament for North Lincolnshire; 1881–1885; With: Rowland Winn 1881–1885; Henry Farmer-Atkinson 1885	Constituency abolished
Preceded by Edward King-Harman	Member of Parliament for Isle of Thanet; 1888–1904	Succeeded by Harry Marks
Political offices
Preceded by Edward Knatchbull-Hugessen	Under-Secretary of State for the Colonies; 1874–1878	Succeeded by The Earl Cadogan
Preceded by Sir Michael Hicks-Beach, Bt	Chief Secretary for Ireland; 1878–1880	Succeeded by William Edward Forster
