= Sir Alfred Pease, 2nd Baronet =

British politician

Sir Alfred Pease Bt
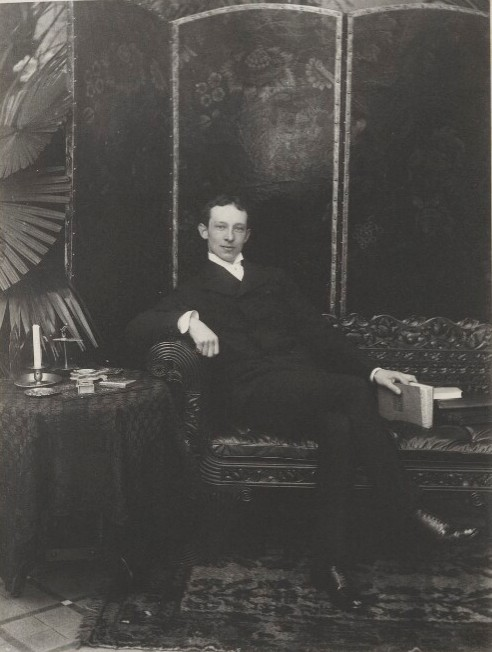
- Sir Alfred Pease, 2nd Baronet

Member of Parliament for York
- In office 18 December 1885 – 26 July 1892 Serving with Frank Lockwood
- Preceded by: Frederick Milner; Ralph Creyke
- Succeeded by: John Butcher; Frank Lockwood

Personal details
- Born: 29 June 1857
- Died: 27 April 1939 (aged 81)
- Party: Liberal

Sir Alfred Edward Pease, 2nd Baronet (29 June 1857 – 27 April 1939), was a British Liberal Party politician who sat in the House of Commons between 1885 and 1902 and who became a pioneer settler of British East Africa, now Kenya.

== Early life ==
Alfred Pease was a member of the family of Quaker industrialists, known in Britain as the Darlington Peases. He was the elder son of Joseph W. Pease, 1st Bt and his wife Mary Fox. His younger brother gained a peerage and became Joseph Albert Pease, 1st Baron Gainford.

Alfred was educated at Grove House School, Tottenham, and at Trinity College, Cambridge.

== Career ==
He began his career in the family bank, J. & J. W. Pease, of which he later became both a director and partner. He held similar positions in Pease & Partners, whose subsidiary interests embraced collieries, Ironstone mines, limestone quarries, as well as iron manufacturing, fabrication and construction. In the course of his years, he served as managing director, Vice-Chairman (1907) and chairman (1927) of the Owners of the Middlesbrough Estate.

From 1885 until 1892 he was one of the two Liberal Members of Parliament returned for York, and then from 1897 until 1902 the Cleveland division of Yorkshire.

During his years in parliament, he served as a J.P. and Alderman for the North Riding of Yorkshire, a Deputy Lieutenant for Cleveland division, as well as being appointed to the Lieutenancy for the City of London He was also a founder and President of the Cleveland Bay Horse Society.

Pease had apparently indicated that he was in declining health before the general election of 1900 but was pressed by his local Liberal Association to contest that election. He did so on condition that if his condition made it impossible for him to sit for the whole Parliament he would be allowed to resign, and by September 1902 he referred to ill-health and asked to step down. He did so with the appointment as Steward of the Manor of Northstead on 21 October 1902. With the failure of the family business interests in 1902, he thus brought his political career to a close and amidst the wreckage sought out new opportunity, which was to take him to South Africa.

== Africa ==
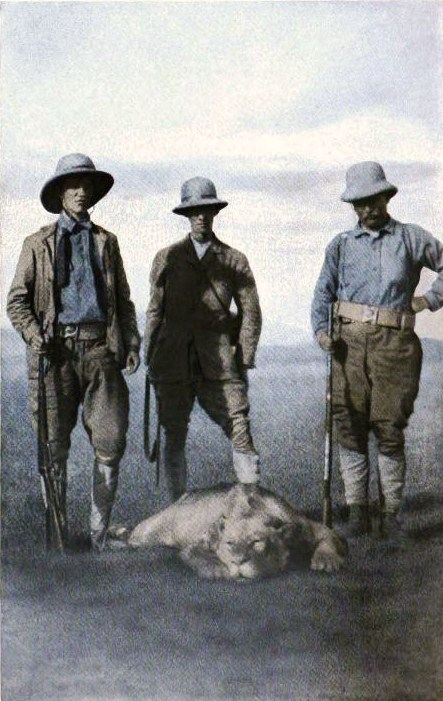
Sir Alfred Pease (centre) in 1909, hunting with former US President Theodore Roosevelt (right) and Roosevelt's son Kermit

Between 1903 and 1905, Pease served as a Resident Magistrate at Barberton in what was then the Transvaal Colony, but now Mpumalanga, in South Africa, before moving to the opposite end of the continent, to explore the Sudan, Somaliland, and the northern Sahara. During this time he continued to write of his travels and experiences; a habit that had begun with his "Biskra and Oases of the Zibans" (1893) and followed by "Hunting Reminiscences", (1898). "The Badger", (1898). "Horse Breeding for Farmers", (1902). and "Travels and Sport in Africa", (1902). "Rachel Gurney of the Grove", (1907). "The Diaries of Edward Pease", (1907). "The Book of the Lion", (1914) and "Memoir of Edmund Loder", (1922).

In 1906, he leased more than 6,000 acres (24 km^{2}) of prairie land in the Athi Plains region of British East Africa, southeast of present-day Nairobi. There he founded an ostrich-ranch and hunted the game which was at that time plentiful on Kenya's high plateaus. The Pease property, Kitanga near Machakos was situated close to the Uganda Railway, and this enabled Sir Alfred to host a number of the famous travellers who hunted during the great age of safaris. As a result, he is mentioned in many of the personal accounts of the period.

Theodore Roosevelt, who enjoyed Pease's hospitality in 1909, with his son Kermit, at the start of his world-famous expedition to Africa, described Sir Alfred as 'a singularly good rider and one of the best game shots I have ever seen.'

In 1909 he became one of the founder members of the Shikar Club formed to promote the activity of hunting and shooting Big Game animals. Specimens from Sir Alfred's animal collections can be seen at the Dorman Museum.

Pease died aged 81 in 1939, and his eldest son, Edward Pease (1880–1963), succeeded to the baronetcy. When he died, the title passed to his elder son by his third marriage, (Alfred) Vincent Pease (1926–2008), who died without issue. The baronetcy then passed in 2008, to Sir Alfred's youngest son, being the younger son of the third marriage, Joseph Gurney Pease, who became the 5th Baronet and is the current holder of the title.

== Family ==
Pease married three times. His first marriage in 1880, was to his first cousin, Helen Ann Fowler, third child of Sir Robert Fowler, 1st Baronet. The marriage produced two sons and a daughter. His second marriage, in 1912, was to Laure Marianne Sugnet de Montmagny and was childless. His last marriage, in 1922, was to Emily Elizabeth Smith and produced two more sons and two more daughters.

The second son, Captain Christopher York Pease, was killed in the last year of World War I, on 9 May 1918, and was buried in the Mazingarbe Communal Cemetery Extension. His gravestone inscription in France reads: "BELOVED THOU DOEST FAITHFULLY WHATSOEVER THOU DOEST". A cousin from what would become the Daryngton branch, Lt. Ronald Herbert Pike Pease of the Coldstream Guards, had already been killed in 1916. Christopher Pease was serving in the Yorkshire Hussars. Captain Pease was older than the norm and was 31 when he died.

Katherine Routledge was a first cousin of Pease, and she visited him in Kenya in 1904. Later she and her husband led the Mana expedition to Easter Island from 1913 to 1915, during time which she carried out excavations of the island's monuments, and recorded oral history of the island's past. His son-in-law was the cricketer Walter Medlicott.

== See also ==
- List of political families in the United Kingdom

Parliament of the United Kingdom
Preceded by Sir Frederick George Milner; Ralph Creyke	Member of Parliament for York; 1885 – 1892; With: Sir Frank Lockwood	Succeeded by Sir Frank Lockwood; John George Butcher
Preceded by Henry Fell Pease	Member of Parliament for Cleveland; 1897 – 1902	Succeeded by Herbert Samuel
Baronetage of the United Kingdom
Preceded by Joseph Whitwell Pease	Baronet (of Hutton Lowcross and Pinchinthorpe); 1903–1939	Succeeded by Edward Pease
