= Gillean Maclaine =

Scottish clan chief (1921–1970)

Gillean Robert Maclaine of Lochbuie, 20th Baron of Moy (3 January 1921 – 5 May 1970) was the 25th hereditary Chief of Clan Maclaine of Lochbuie.

Son of Kenneth Douglas Lorne MacLaine, 19th Baron of Moy, 24th of Lochbuie, and Olive Marguerite Stewart- Richardson, Lady Moy. Married Noreen Olive Beadon; one son, Lorne Maclaine.

In August 1942 he received an emergency commission into The Black Watch (Royal Highland Regiment) and immediately transferred to the Glider Pilot Regiment. By 1944 he was serving as Section Commander, F Squadron ( No. 2 Wing), The Glider Pilot Regiment, part of the Airborne Forces at Arnhem. By the time of his retirement, as an Hon. Captain on 25 November 1953, he had transferred back to The Black Watch.

== Sources ==
- Beauclerk Dewar, Peter (2001). Burke's landed gentry of Great Britain Vol 1 Scotland. Burke's Peerage & Gentry. p. 923. ISBN 978-0-9711966-0-5.

Baronage of Scotland
Preceded by Kenneth Maclaine; 19th Baron of Moy	Baron of Moy; 1970-present	Succeeded by Lorne Maclaine, 21st Baron of Moy
