= Joseph Johnson Leeman =

English politician

Member of Parliament for York
- In office 1880 – 2 November 1883 Serving with Ralph Creyke
- Preceded by: George Leeman; James Lowther
- Succeeded by: Frederick Milner; Ralph Creyke

Personal details
- Born: 1842
- Died: 2 November 1883 (aged 41)
- Party: Liberal
- Spouse: Emily Maud Mary née Smethurst
- Relations: Joseph Johnson (grandfather)
- Parent(s): George Leeman (father); Jane Johnson (mother)

Joseph Johnson Leeman (1842 – 2 November 1883) was an English Liberal Party politician who sat in the House of Commons from 1880 to 1883.

Leeman was the son of George Leeman, previous MP for York, and his wife Jane Johnson daughter of Joseph Johnson of London. He was educated at St Peter's School, York. He was a Deputy Lieutenant for the West Riding of Yorkshire and the City of York.

At the 1880 general election Leeman was elected Member of Parliament for York. He held the seat until his death aged 41 in 1883.

Leeman married Emily Maud Mary Smethurst daughter of Richard Smethurst of Ellerbeck, Lancashire in 1879.

Parliament of the United Kingdom
Preceded by George Leeman; James Lowther	Member of Parliament for York; 1880 – 1883; With: Ralph Creyke	Succeeded by Ralph Creyke; Sir Frederick Milner, Bt
