= Ralph Creyke =

British politician (1849–1908)

- Creyke in 1880

Member of Parliament for York
- In office 27 April 1880 – 18 December 1885 Serving with Joseph Johnson Leeman (1880-1883); Frederick Milner (1883-1885)
- Preceded by: George Leeman; James Lowther
- Succeeded by: Alfred Pease; Frank Lockwood

Personal details
- Born: 5 September 1849
- Died: 17 April 1908 (aged 58) Rawcliffe Hall, Lancashire, England, United Kingdom
- Party: Liberal

Ralph Creyke (5 September 1849 – 17 April 1908) was an English Liberal politician who sat in the House of Commons from 1880 to 1885.

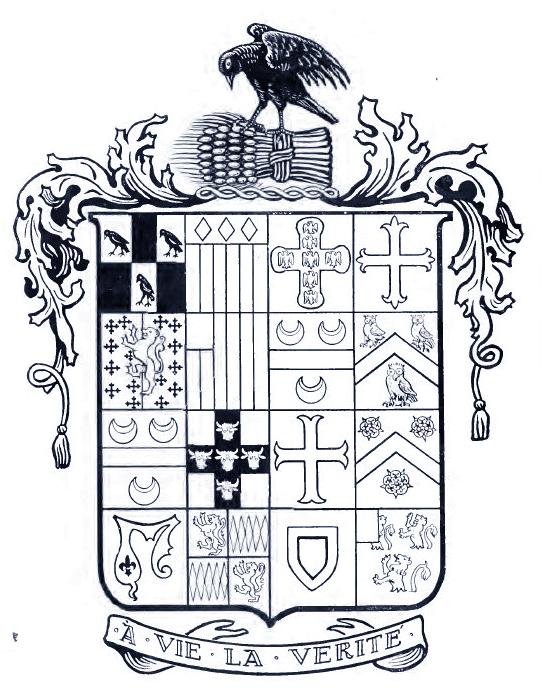
Heraldic Achievement of Ralph Creyke

Creyke was the son of Ralph Creyke of Rawcliffe and Marton Yorkshire and his wife Louisa Frances Croft, daughter of Colonel Croft of Stillington Hall, York. He was educated at Eton College and admitted at Trinity Hall, Cambridge before migrating to Downing College, Cambridge. He was a J.P. for East and West Ridings of York, Middlesex and Westminster and a Deputy Lieutenant for the West Riding.

At the 1880 general election Creyke was elected Member of Parliament for York. He held the seat until 1885. He was High Sheriff of Yorkshire in 1894.

Creyke died at Rawcliffe Hall at the age of 58. He was married and had a family.

Parliament of the United Kingdom
Preceded by George Leeman; James Lowther	Member of Parliament for City of York; 1880 – 1885; With: Joseph Johnson Leeman to 1883; Sir Frederick Milner, Bt 1883–85	Succeeded by Alfred Pease; Frank Lockwood
