= Doreen Hope, Marchioness of Linlithgow =

British aristocrat and Vicereine of India

Doreen Maud Hope CI, DStJ
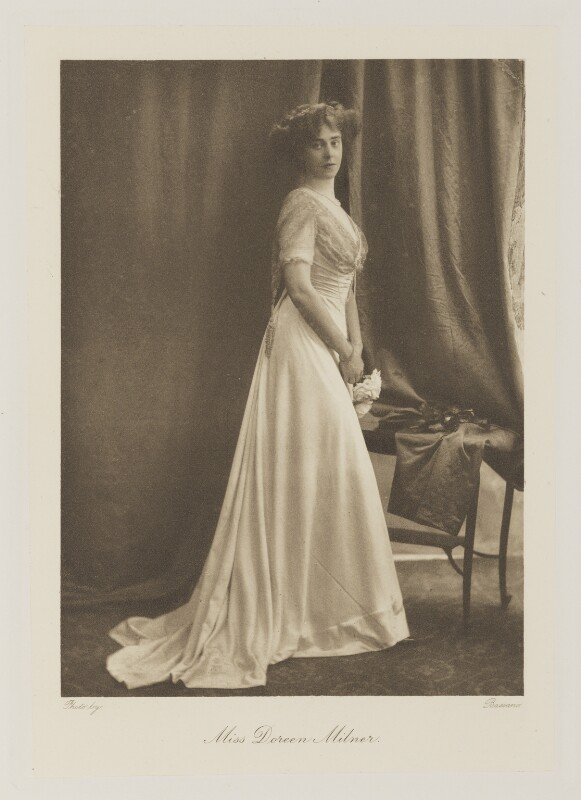
- Her Excellency The Most Honourable, The Marchioness of Linlithgow
- Born: 20 March 1886
- Died: 2 August 1965 (aged 79); Kingston Hospital, Kingston-on-Thames, England
- Resting place: Hopetoun Mausoleum, Hopetoun House
- Spouse: Victor Hope, 2nd Marquess of Linlithgow (m. 1911; died 1952)
- Children: 5
- Parents: Sir Frederick Milner, 7th Baronet (father); Adeline Gertrude Beckett-Denison (mother)
- Relatives: Charles Hope (son); John Hope (son); William Beckett-Denison (maternal grandfather)

Doreen Maud Hope, Marchioness of Linlithgow, CI, DStJ (née Milner; 20 March 1886 – 2 August 1965) was a British aristocrat and Vicereine of India. She was the daughter of Sir Frederick Milner, 7th Baronet. She married, on 19 April 1911, Victor Hope, 2nd Marquess of Linlithgow. They had five children. She was appointed Dame of Grace, Most Venerable Order of the Hospital of St. John of Jerusalem, and Imperial Order of the Crown of India in 1936. She was awarded the Kaisar-i-Hind Gold Medal.

She died on 2 August 1965 at the Kingston Hospital, Kingston-on-Thames. She was interred at the Hopetoun Mausoleum, Hopetoun House.
