= Sir John Dugdale Astley, 3rd Baronet =

British politician (1828–1894)

Lieutenant-Colonel Sir John Dugdale Astley 3rd Baronet
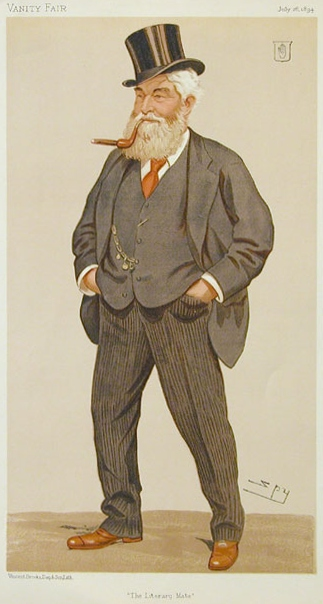
- "The Literary Mate", caricature by Spy in Vanity Fair, 1894

Member of Parliament for North Lincolnshire
- In office 17 February 1874 – 31 March 1880
- Preceded by: Montague Cholmeley and Rowland Winn
- Succeeded by: Robert Laycock and Rowland Winn

Personal details
- Born: 19 February 1828
- Died: 10 October 1894 (aged 66)
- Party: Conservative
- Spouse: Eleanor Blanche Mary Corbett
- Children: Francis Astley-Corbett (successor)
- Profession: Soldier, sportsman, politician

Military service
- Branch/service: British Army
- Rank: Lieutenant-Colonel
- Unit: Scots Fusilier Guards
- Battles/wars: Crimean War

Lieutenant-Colonel Sir John Dugdale Astley, 3rd Baronet (19 February 1828 – 10 October 1894) was an English soldier and sportsman.

== Life ==
He was the son of the 2nd Baronet (created 1821), Sir Francis Dugdale Astley, and his wife Emma Dorothea Lethbridge, and a descendant of Lord Astley.

From 1848 to 1859, he served in the Scots Fusilier Guards, seeing action in the Crimean War and retiring as a Lieutenant-Colonel.

On 22 May 1858, he married an heiress, Eleanor Blanche Mary Corbett, of Elsham Hall, North Lincolnshire. Eleanor (died 7 June 1897) was the daughter of Thomas George Corbett (died 5 July 1868) and his wife Lady Mary Noel Beauclerk (28 December 1810 – 29 November 1850), whom he had married on 15 December 1837. Lady Mary was the daughter of the 8th Duke of St Albans. Thereafter, Sir John devoted himself to sports, including horse racing, boxing, and pedestrianism. He was a popular figure at horse race meetings, known familiarly as 'the Mate', and for winning and losing large sums of money. Two famous jockeys who rode regularly for him were George Fordham and Charlie Wood.

He succeeded to the baronetcy in 1873. From 1874 to 1880, he was the Conservative Member of Parliament for North Lincolnshire, as his father-in-law had been before him.

Shortly before his death in October 1894, he published entertaining reminiscences under the title Fifty Years of My Life. This contains the first recorded appearance of the phrase 'like a duck to water' – I always took to shooting like a duck to water.

== See also ==
- Astley baronets

Parliament of the United Kingdom
Preceded by Montague Cholmeley; Rowland Winn	Member of Parliament for North Lincolnshire; 1874–1880; With: Rowland Winn	Succeeded by Robert Laycock; Rowland Winn
Baronetage of the United Kingdom
Preceded by Francis Dugdale Astley	Baronet (of Everley); 1873–1894	Succeeded by Francis Astley-Corbett
