= Henry Farmer-Atkinson =

English Conservative Party politician and shipowner

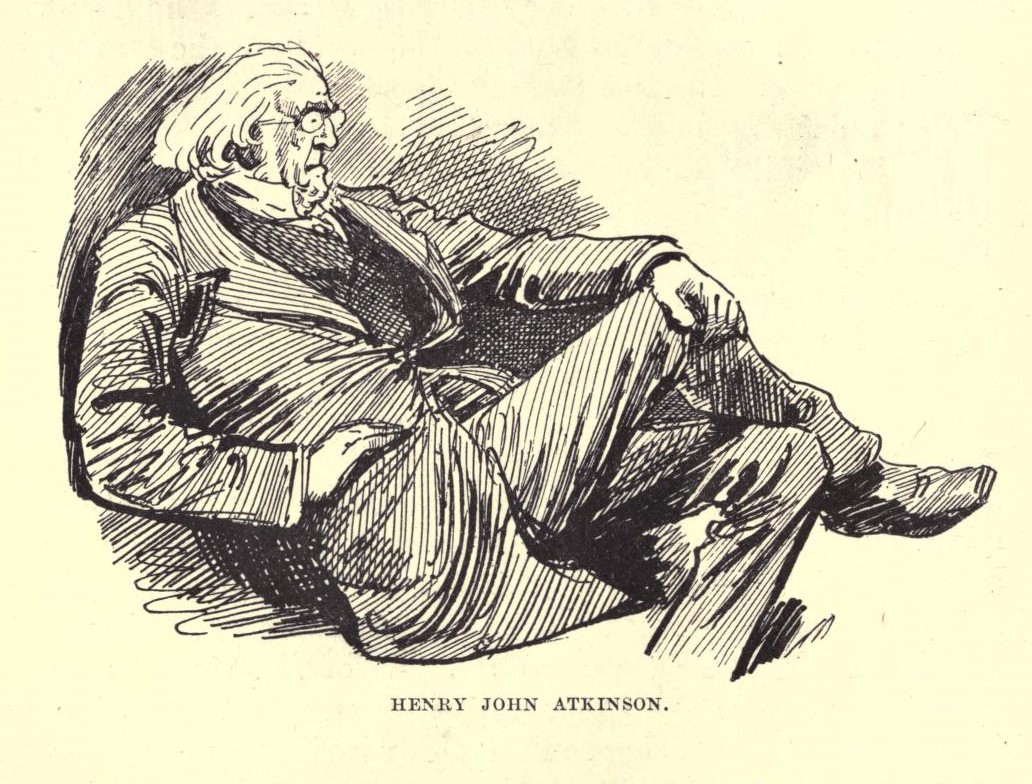
Caricature of Henry John Atkinson MP (circa 1890), by Harry Furniss.

Henry John Atkinson, later Henry John Farmer-Atkinson JP, MP, (1828–1913) was an English Conservative Party politician and shipowner.

Atkinson was Mayor of Hull twice, in 1864 and 1865. He stood as a Conservative Party candidate for the two-seat constituency of Kingston-upon-Hull in the General election of 1868, but finished third with 6383 votes, against his Liberal Party opponents' 7282 and 6874. He stood again for the Conservative Party at Kingston-upon-Hull at the 1880 General election, but this time finished fourth. He was elected Member of Parliament (MP) for North Lincolnshire at a by-election in July 1885. That constituency was abolished under the Redistribution of Seats Act 1885, and at the 1885 general election he stood in the new Brigg division of Lincolnshire, but lost to his Liberal opponent, taking only 35% of the vote. At the 1886 general election he stood in Boston, winning the seat by a narrow majority of 48 votes (2%) from the sitting Liberal MP William Ingram. He did not defend the seat, when it was regained by Ingram. He stood as an independent candidate at the August 1892 by-election in Derby, but won only 20% of the vote.

He was a prominent Wesleyan Methodist layman, and was one of the 18 laymen nominated by the Wesleyan Methodist Conference of 1877 to attend the conference of 1878 - the first to include Lay Representation.

He was the founder and first president of The Chamber of Shipping of the United Kingdom.

He married firstly in 1854 Elizabeth Holmes (1832–1863), and secondly in 1869 Elizabeth Farmer (daughter of Thomas Farmer 1790–1861). In 1891 he assumed surname Farmer-Atkinson. Farmer-Atkinson died at his home, Woodcote Place near Epsom, Surrey, on 3 March 1913.

Parliament of the United Kingdom
Preceded by Rowland Winn and James Lowther	Member of Parliament for North Lincolnshire; July 1885 – November 1885; With: James Lowther	constituency abolished
Preceded by William James Ingram	Member of Parliament for Boston; 1886–1892	Succeeded by William James Ingram
