= North Lincolnshire (constituency) =

Parliamentary constituency in the United Kingdom, 1832–1885

- Former county constituency for the House of Commons
- Context of 1832-1868. Extract from 1837 result: the easterly striped coastal area south of the Humber.
- County: Lincolnshire

1832–1885
- Seats: Two
- Created from: Lincolnshire
- Replaced by: Brigg; Gainsborough; Louth

North Lincolnshire, formally known as the Northern Division of Lincolnshire or as Parts of Lindsey, was a county constituency in the Lindsey district of Lincolnshire. It returned two Members of Parliament (MPs) to the House of Commons of the Parliament of the United Kingdom.

== History ==
The constituency was created by the Reform Act 1832 for the 1832 general election, and abolished by the Redistribution of Seats Act 1885 for the 1885 general election. It was then split into six new single-seat constituencies: Brigg, Gainsborough, Horncastle, Louth, Sleaford, Spalding and Stamford

== Boundaries ==
1832–1868: The Parts of Lindsey (see Parts of Lincolnshire).

1868–1885: The Wapentakes, Hundreds, or Sokes of Manley, Yarborough, Bradley Haverstoe, Ludborough, Walshcroft, Aslacoe, Corringham, Louth Eske, and Calceworth, so much as lies within Louth Eske.

== Members of Parliament ==
Election	First Member	First Party	Second Member	Second Party
1832	Hon. Charles Anderson-Pelham	Whig	Sir William Amcotts-Ingilby, Bt	Radical
1835	Hon. Charles Anderson-Pelham	Whig	Thomas Corbett	Conservative
1837	Hon. Charles Anderson-Pelham	Whig	Robert Christopher	Conservative
Jan. 1847 by-election	Sir Montague Cholmeley, Bt	Whig	Robert Christopher	Conservative
1852	James Stanhope	Conservative	Robert Christopher	Conservative
1857	James Stanhope	Conservative	Sir Montague Cholmeley, Bt	Whig
1859	James Stanhope	Conservative	Sir Montague Cholmeley, Bt	Liberal
1868	Rowland Winn	Conservative	Sir Montague Cholmeley, Bt	Liberal
1874	Rowland Winn	Conservative	Sir John Dugdale Astley, Bt	Conservative
1880	Rowland Winn	Conservative	Robert Laycock	Liberal
Sep. 1881 by-election	Rowland Winn	Conservative	James Lowther	Conservative
Jul. 1885 by-election	Henry Atkinson	Conservative	James Lowther	Conservative
1885	Redistribution of Seats Act: constituency abolished			

== Election results ==
=== Elections in the 1830s ===
General election 1832: North Lincolnshire
Party	Candidate	Votes	%
Whig	Charles Anderson-Pelham	6,561	42.7
Radical	William Amcotts-Ingilby	4,751	30.9
Tory	Sir Robert Sheffield, 4th Baronet	4,056	26.4
Turnout		8,338	91.3
Registered electors		9,134	
Majority		1,810	11.8
Whig win (new seat)			
Majority		695	4.5
Radical win (new seat)			

General election 1835: North Lincolnshire
Party	Candidate	Votes	%	±%
Whig	Charles Anderson-Pelham	4,489	34.7	−8.0
Conservative	Thomas Corbett	4,450	34.4	+8.0
Radical	William Amcotts-Ingilby	3,984	30.8	−0.1
Turnout		7,827	88.2	−3.1
Registered electors		8,872		
Majority		39	0.3	−11.5
Whig hold		Swing	−8.0	
Majority		466	3.6	N/A
Conservative gain from Radical		Swing	+8.0	

General election 1837: North Lincolnshire
Party	Candidate	Votes	%
Whig	Charles Anderson-Pelham	Unopposed	
Conservative	Robert Christopher	Unopposed	
Registered electors		10,063	
Whig hold			
Conservative hold			

=== Elections in the 1840s ===
General election 1841: North Lincolnshire
Party	Candidate	Votes	%	±%
Whig	Charles Anderson-Pelham	5,401	39.3	N/A
Conservative	Robert Christopher	4,522	32.9	N/A
Conservative	Charles Cust	3,819	27.8	N/A
Majority		879	6.4	N/A
Turnout		6,871 (est)	66.8 (est)	N/A
Registered electors		10,280		
Whig hold				
Conservative hold				

Anderson-Pelham succeeded to the peerage, becoming 2nd Earl of Yarborough and causing a by-election.

By-election, 12 January 1847: North Lincolnshire
Party	Candidate	Votes	%	±%
Whig	Sir Montague Cholmeley	Unopposed		
Whig hold				

General election 1847: North Lincolnshire
Party	Candidate	Votes	%	±%
Whig	Sir Montague Cholmeley	Unopposed		
Conservative	Robert Christopher	Unopposed		
Registered electors		11,424		
Whig hold				
Conservative hold				

=== Elections in the 1850s ===
Christopher was appointed Chancellor of the Duchy of Lancaster, requiring a by-election.

By-election, 13 March 1852: North Lincolnshire
Party	Candidate	Votes	%	±%
Conservative	Robert Christopher	Unopposed		
Conservative hold				

General election 1852: North Lincolnshire
Party	Candidate	Votes	%	±%
Conservative	Robert Christopher	5,585	35.0	N/A
Conservative	James Stanhope	5,579	35.0	N/A
Whig	Montague Cholmeley	4,777	30.0	N/A
Majority		802	5.0	N/A
Turnout		10,359 (est)	88.7 (est)	N/A
Registered electors		11,677		
Conservative hold				
Conservative gain from Whig				

General election 1857: North Lincolnshire
Party	Candidate	Votes	%	±%
Whig	Montague Cholmeley	Unopposed		
Conservative	James Stanhope	Unopposed		
Registered electors		12,435		
Whig gain from Conservative				
Conservative hold				

General election 1859: North Lincolnshire
Party	Candidate	Votes	%	±%
Liberal	Montague Cholmeley	Unopposed		
Conservative	James Stanhope	Unopposed		
Registered electors		12,401		
Liberal hold				
Conservative hold				

=== Elections in the 1860s ===
General election 1865: North Lincolnshire
Party	Candidate	Votes	%	±%
Liberal	Montague Cholmeley	Unopposed		
Conservative	James Stanhope	Unopposed		
Registered electors		12,372		
Liberal hold				
Conservative hold				

General election 1868: North Lincolnshire
Party	Candidate	Votes	%	±%
Liberal	Montague Cholmeley	Unopposed		
Conservative	Rowland Winn	Unopposed		
Registered electors		9,436		
Liberal hold				
Conservative hold				

=== Elections in the 1870s ===
General election 1874: North Lincolnshire
Party	Candidate	Votes	%	±%
Conservative	John Dugdale Astley	Unopposed		
Conservative	Rowland Winn	Unopposed		
Registered electors		10,117		
Conservative gain from Liberal				
Conservative hold				

Winn was appointed a Lord Commissioner of the Treasury, requiring a by-election.

By-election, 16 Mar 1874: North Lincolnshire
Party	Candidate	Votes	%	±%
Conservative	Rowland Winn	Unopposed		
Conservative hold				

=== Elections in the 1880s ===
General election 1880: North Lincolnshire
Party	Candidate	Votes	%	±%
Liberal	Robert Laycock	4,159	34.7	New
Conservative	Rowland Winn	3,949	33.0	N/A
Conservative	John Dugdale Astley	3,865	32.3	N/A
Majority		294	2.4	N/A
Turnout		8,066 (est)	75.8 (est)	N/A
Registered electors		10,639		
Liberal gain from Conservative		Swing		
Conservative hold		Swing		

Laycock's death caused a by-election.

By-election, 3 Sep 1881: North Lincolnshire
Party	Candidate	Votes	%	±%
Conservative	James Lowther	4,200	53.0	−12.3
Liberal	George Tomline	3,729	47.0	+12.3
Majority		471	6.0	N/A
Turnout		7,929	71.7	−4.1 (est)
Registered electors		11,061		
Conservative gain from Liberal		Swing	−12.3	

Winn was elevated to the peerage, becoming Lord St Oswald, causing a by-election.

By-election, 10 July 1885: North Lincolnshire
Party	Candidate	Votes	%	±%
Conservative	Henry Atkinson	4,052	58.5	−6.8
Liberal	Henry Meysey-Thompson	2,872	41.5	+6.8
Majority		1,180	17.0	N/A
Turnout		6,924	66.4	−9.4
Registered electors		10,435		
Conservative hold		Swing	−6.8	
