= Rowland Winn, 1st Baron St Oswald =

English industrialist and politician

Rowland Winn
- 1st Baron St Oswald
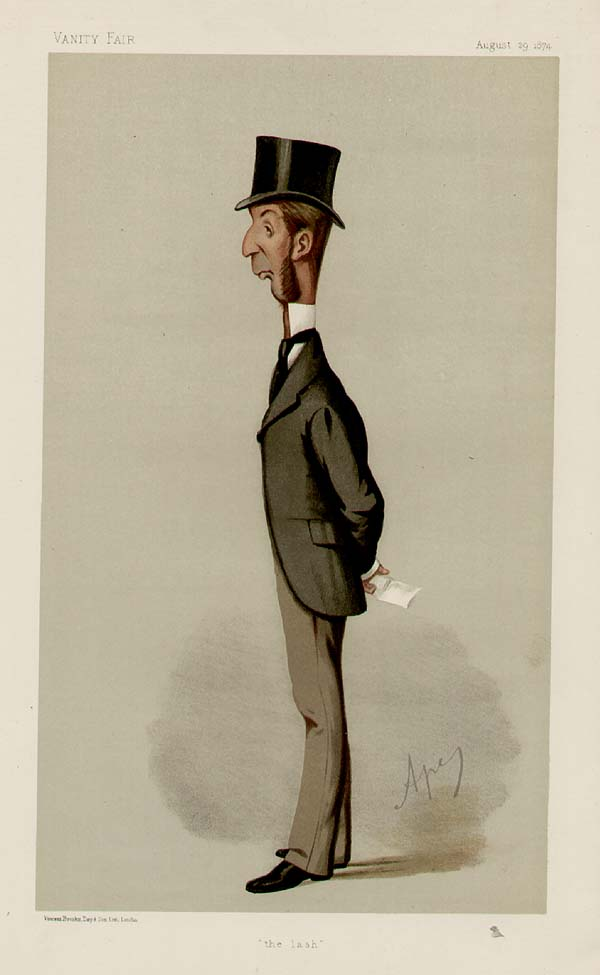
- "The Lash", caricature by Ape in Vanity Fair (1874)
- Tenure: 1885–1893
- Predecessor: Title created
- Successor: 2nd Baron St Oswald
- Known for: Founding modern Scunthorpe, ironstone development, Conservative Chief Whip
- Born: 19 February 1820; Nostell Priory, near Wakefield, England
- Died: 19 January 1893 (aged 72) (Add if known)
- Residence: Nostell Priory; Appleby Hall
- Spouse: Harriet Dumaresque
- Issue: Rowland Winn, Maud, Laura
- Occupation: Industrialist, politician

Rowland Winn, 1st Baron St Oswald (19 February 1820 – 19 January 1893) was an English industrialist and Conservative Party politician.

He was instrumental in promoting and developing the ironstone ore fields in North Lincolnshire leading to the establishment of Scunthorpe as a national iron production centre, and a key promoter of the Trent, Ancholme and Grimsby Railway.

== Biography ==
The eldest son of Charles Winn of Nostell Priory, near Wakefield, he lived in the 1850s in another family property, Appleby Hall near Scunthorpe, and married Harriet Dumaresque. Aware that the area had produced iron in Roman times, he searched for ironstone on his land, and found it in 1859. He marketed it to iron-makers, leased land for mining, mined his own ore and encouraged the building of iron works.

To transport the iron and to bring the coal necessary for the smelting, Winn campaigned for a railway to be built, which required the passage of an Act of Parliament. The Trent, Ancholme and Grimsby Railway opened in 1866, and Winn also built 193 houses in New Frodingham and enlarged the local school. Later, he financed the building of Scunthorpe Church of England School and St John's Church.

He was Member of Parliament (MP) for North Lincolnshire from 1868 to 1885, and served as a junior Lord of the Treasury (Government whip) in Disraeli's second government, from 1874 to 1880. He was Conservative Party Chief Whip from 1880 to 1885. Here he had to deal with Lord Randolph Churchill and the Fourth Party. He was later ennobled as Baron Saint Oswald, of Nostell in the West Riding of the County of York in 1885, when the Conservatives were returned to power.

He returned to live at Nostell Priory when he inherited the house from his father in 1874, but his mother and unmarried sisters continued to live at Appleby.

His son Rowland (1857–1919) was MP for Pontefract from 1885 to 1893. His daughter Maud married Lt-General Alan Montagu-Stuart-Wortley. In 1897, Baron and Lady St. Oswald and their daughter Maud were guests at the Duchess of Devonshire's Diamond Jubilee Costume Ball. His daughter Laura married Valentine Lawless, 4th Baron Cloncurry, an Irish nobleman.

== Arms ==
Coat of arms of Rowland Winn, 1st Baron St Oswald
Crest A demi-eagle displayed Or ducally gorged Ermine. Escutcheon Ermine on a fess Vert three eagles displayed Or. Supporters Two dragons reguardant Vert each gorged with a ribbon Or pendant therefrom an escutcheon Gules charged with a rose Argent. Motto Tout Pour Dieu Et Ma Patrie (Everything For God and My Fatherland)

== Notes ==
Parliament of the United Kingdom
Preceded by James Stanhope; Sir Montague John Cholmeley	Member of Parliament for North Lincolnshire; 1868–1885; With: Sir Montague John Cholmeley 1868–1874; Sir John Dugdale Astley 1874–1880; Robert Laycock 1880–1881; James Lowther 1881–1885	Succeeded by James Lowther; Henry John Farmer-Atkinson
Peerage of the United Kingdom
New title	Baron St Oswald; 1885–1893	Succeeded by Rowland Winn
