= Lochbuie, Mull =

Settlement on the Isle of Mull, Scotland

Coordinates: 56°21′20″N 5°51′32″W

Lochbuie: Scottish Gaelic: Locha Buidhe
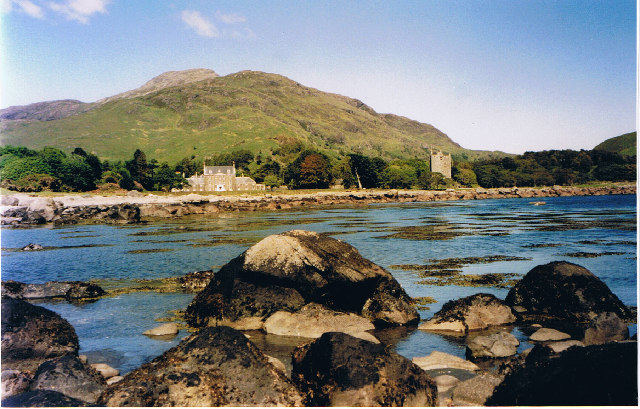
- Lochbuie House and Moy Castle

- Location within Argyll and Bute
- OS grid reference: NM616249
- Council area: Argyll and Bute
- Lieutenancy area: Argyll and Bute
- Country: Scotland
- Sovereign state: United Kingdom
- Post town: ISLE OF MULL
- Postcode district: PA62
- Dialling code: 01680
- Police: Scotland
- Fire: Scottish
- Ambulance: Scottish
- UK Parliament: Argyll, Bute and South Lochaber
- Scottish Parliament: Argyll and Bute

Lochbuie (Scottish Gaelic: Locha Buidhe, meaning "yellow loch") is a settlement on the Isle of Mull, in the council area of Argyll and Bute, Scotland about 22 kilometres (14 mi) west of Craignure.

== Geography ==
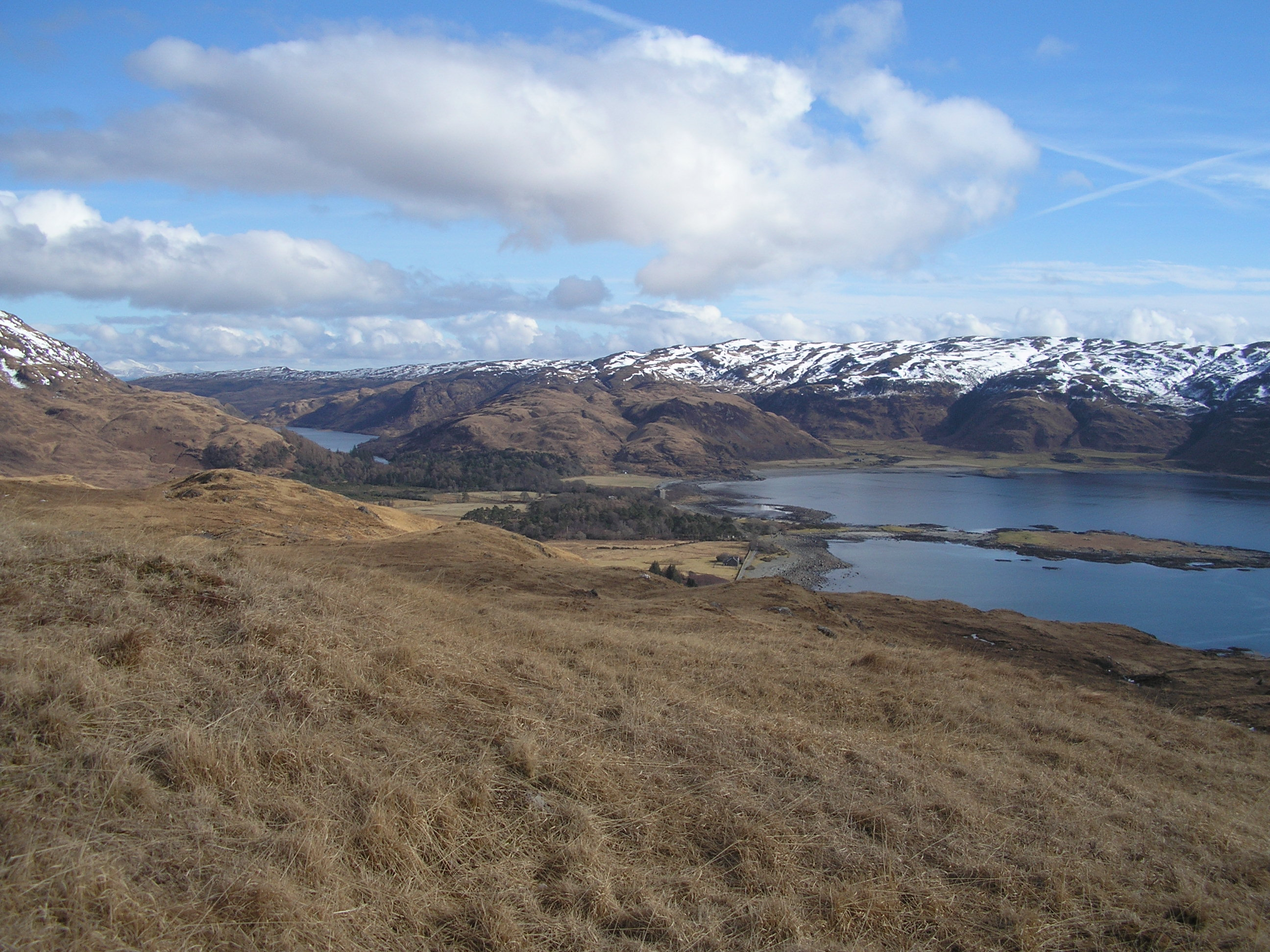
Lochbuie from the west with Loch Uisg at left, Moy Castle at centre, Eilean Mòr to the right and Druim Fada beyond.

Once known as the "Garden of Mull", the fertile land around the main village of seventeen houses is surrounded by hills, with the narrow valley to the east containing both Loch Uisg and the only road to the estate. The settlement lies at the head of Loch Buie, a sea loch which contains the tidal islands of Eilean Mòr and Eilean Uamh Ghuaidhre. Frank Lockwood's Island (or Eilean Sneth Dian) lies in the Firth of Lorne, just offshore from the Laggan peninsula to the south. This island is named after Frank Lockwood who was Solicitor General for England and Wales from 1894 to 1895 and the brother-in-law of the 21st MacLean of Lochbuie.

The highest hills in the area are Ben Buie whose summit is 747 metres (2,451 ft) above sea level to the north, the Druim Fada range reaching 405 metres (1,329 ft) to the south and Craig Ben, at 698 metres (2,290 ft) to the east, overlooking Loch Spelve. A track allows walking access to Carsaig 10 kilometres (6 mi) to the west.

== History ==
There is a fine stone circle at Lochbuie, the only one on Mull, and the remains of a pre-historic tomb. Both these sites are scheduled monuments, as is Moy Castle, originally a 14th-century keep, subsequently altered, and is now an uninhabited 3-storey tower. It is near the imposing 18th-century Lochbuie House and both buildings were once the seat of Clan Maclaine of Lochbuie. There is the medieval chapel of Caibeal Mheamhair, which may originally have been dedicated to St. Oran, rebuilt in the 19th century as a mausoleum for the MacLaine family. A luxurious silver brooch (known as the Lochbuie Brooch) dating to c. 1500 was found on the estate and has been in the British Museum's collection since 1855. Lochbuie is in the Diocese of Argyll and the Isles and there is a small Episcopal church built in 1876 consecrated to the mythical St Kilda.

Between 1752 and the construction of the existing mansion house the MacLaine lived in a smaller house on the estate. There is an inscription above a doorway in Lochbuie House farm square that states: "After leaving Moy Castle the Lochbuie family resided in this house from 1752 to 1789 and it was in this house that Dr. Johnson and Mr. Boswell were entertained in 1773 by John MacLaine XVII chief of Lochbuie."

Samuel Johnson wrote:

We came without any difficulty, at evening, to Lochbuy, where we found a true Highland Laird, rough and haughty, and tenacious of his dignity; who, hearing my name, inquired whether I was of the Johnstons of Glencroe, or of Ardnamurchan.

Lochbuy has, like the other insular Chieftains, quitted the castle that sheltered his ancestors, and lives near it, in a mansion not very spacious or splendid. I have seen no houses in the Islands much to be envied for convenience or magnificence, yet they bare testimony to the progress of arts and civility, as they shew that rapine and surprise are no longer dreaded, and are much more commodious than the ancient fortresses.

Among the island's notable residents have been Hester Gatty, wife of the poet Siegfried Sassoon, and their son George Sassoon, who in the 1960s was a farmer at Lochbuie.

== Economy ==
The 8,900-hectare (22,000-acre) Lochbuie Estate, run by the Corbett family since 1921, is a sporting estate and a cattle farm. Self-catering cottages are available and both loch and sea-fishing.

== Media and the arts ==
Scenes for the 1945 film I Know Where I'm Going! directed by Michael Powell and Emeric Pressburger were shot at Lochbuie, and a group of 40 fans visited to celebrate the 60th anniversary of the film's release in 2005.
