= 1890 Bassetlaw by-election =

UK parliamentary by-election

The 1890 Bassetlaw by-election was a parliamentary by-election held for the British House of Commons constituency of Bassetlaw in Nottinghamshire on 15 December 1890.

== Vacancy ==
The by-election was caused by the death of the sitting Conservative MP, William Beckett-Denison, on 23 November 1890. Beckett-Denison had won the newly created seat at the 1885 general election.

== The candidates ==
The Conservative party selected Sir Frederick Milner, son-in-law of the deceased MP and former member for York, as their candidate. Milner's candidature was supported by Francis Foljambe, a Liberal Unionist and former MP for the area, who had been defeated by Beckett-Denison in the 1885 election. The Liberal candidate was John William Mellor, former MP for Grantham.

== The campaign ==
Campaigning was lively. "The constituency is being flooded with literature of every description", reported the Times. Women campaigners were active, from the Conservative Primrose League and the Women's Liberal association who were reported to be 'taking a Home Rule van through the district'.

The Home Rule issue was a difficult one for the Liberals at this precise moment, with a split in the Irish Parliamentary Party taking place over the continued leadership of Charles Stewart Parnell, following a crisis over the divorce of his partner Katharine O'Shea; Liberal leader William Gladstone had warned the party that Parnell's continued leadership would mean the end of prospects of Home Rule. At a public meeting in the Constituency, the Conservative MP for North Armagh, Edward James Saunderson, made fun of Gladstone's difficulties: "in 1886, a marriage was consummated between Mr Gladstone and his followers and Mr Parnell and his friends. Since then, however, there had been a divorce (cheers and laughter), and ... they had discovered that all the love was on one side". The issue was picked up in a later speech by the Liberal Unionist MP for Tyrone South Thomas Russell: "he would ask his fellow Nonconformists not to submit the Presbyterians, Methodists and Independents of Ireland to the shame and humiliation of being governed by a man who was a convicted adulterer and liar, and whose conduct, he regretted to say, was practically condoned by the Liberal party".

The Liberal position was put in a speech by Henry Labouchère, MP for Northampton: "He was not going to love Ireland less because Mr Parnell loved Mrs O'Shea more. (Laughter) ... Mr Parnell was doing his best to wreck Home Rule in Ireland ... if they could only win [the] Bassetlaw election it would put backbone and hope into the Liberals all over the country." Gladstone himself, speaking at a public meeting in the constituency, emphasised that the crisis only showed how important it was to achieve Home Rule: "Why should English politics, and Scotch and Welsh politics, be dependent on the choice of an Irish leader?"

The Parnell crisis overshadowed all other issues in the campaign, although it was always most likely that Milner would hold his father-in-law's seat, picking up the rural vote while the miners supported the Liberal. The Conservatives defended their actions on improvements in housing for the poor while Milner had spoken against an eight-hour day for miners, which Mellor supported.

== The vote ==
Polling, which opened at 8 a.m., was heavy in the 28 polling districts in the constituency. Counting began at 9 a.m. next morning, with the result declared at half past ten. Milner held the seat for the Conservatives, with a substantially increased majority from the last contested election of 728 votes (Beckett-Denison had been returned unopposed in 1886). He told his supporters that this was a blow against the Liberal leader: "He could only hope that this emphatic answer would cause Mr Gladstone to withdraw himself from the arena of active politics". Mellor, in his turn, assured his followers that "the party would go on increasing and the great cause of Liberalism would surmount all difficulties."

Bassetlaw by-election 1890
Party	Candidate	Votes	%	±%
Conservative	Sir Frederick Milner	4,381	54.5	
Liberal	John William Mellor	3,653	45.5	
Majority		728	9.0	
Turnout		8,034		
Conservative hold		Swing		
