= Clan Maclaine of Lochbuie =

Scottish clan

- MacGhille Eoin
- Motto: Vincere vel mori (To conquer or die)

Profile
- Region: Scottish Highlands
- District: Lochbuie, Mull
- Plant badge: Blackberry
- Pipe music: Lament for MacLaine of Lochbuie

Chief
- The Much Honoured Lorne Gillean Ian McLaine formerly of Lochbuie, Baron of Moy
- 26th Chief of Clan Maclaine of Lochbuie
- Historic seat: Moy Castle
Septs of Clan Maclaine of Lochbuie
McLean, Maclaine, McClain, McLain, MacLayne, MacLean, Lane, Laine, Lain, Layne, Lean, McFadyen, MacFadden, Macfadyen, McPhadon, McFadzean, McPhadzean, Fadden, MacCormack, McCormick, Cormack, Cormick, MacGillivray, MacIlvora, MacBay, MacVay, MacAvoy, McAvoy, Avoy, MacEvoy, Evoy, MacFetridge, Patton, Patten, Paton, Peden, Pedan, Douie, Huie, Beaton, Black, Clanachan, McSpadden, McClanahan
Allied clans
Clan Maclean
Clan Chattan for the Macleans of Dochgarroch

Clan Maclaine of Lochbuie is a Scottish Clan that inhabited lands on the southern end of the Isle of Mull in the Inner Hebrides of the western Scottish Highlands. "Maclaine" is an alternate spelling for "MacLean." Clan Maclaine of Lochbuie and Clan Maclean of Duart are two separate clans which share a strong family connection. The 26th (and current) clan chief is Lorne Gillean Ian Maclaine of Lochbuie, Baron of Moy. The clan is recognised by both the Standing Council of Scottish Chiefs and the Lord Lyon.

== History ==
=== Origins of the clan ===
Clan Maclaine of Lochbuie is translated in Gaelic as Mac'ill-Eathain Locchabuide. They claim descent from Maurice Fitzgerald, an Anglo-Norman who moved to Ireland with Richard de Clare, 2nd Earl of Pembroke, known as "Strongbow." The Fitzgeralds of Ireland are said to have sent offshoots to Scotland in the thirteenth century. Two Fitzgerald cousins are said to have started both Clan Maclean and Clan Mackenzie, with the name MacLean being coined by Gillean-na-Taughe (Gillean of the Battle-Axe), a fierce warrior who lived in the thirteenth century. He and his three sons were also said to have fought against the Vikings at the Battle of Largs in 1263. Later Gillean was said to have signed the Ragman Roll in 1296 as "Gilliemore Macilean" or "Gillean the Great, Son of Gillean."

=== Wars of Scottish Independence ===
During the Wars of Scottish Independence Gillian's grandson, Malcolm, fought at the head of his clan at the Battle of Bannockburn.

=== 14th and 15th centuries ===
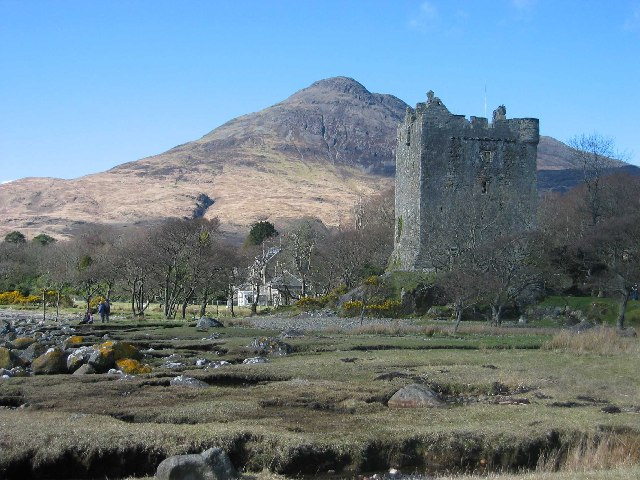
Moy Castle on Lochbuie, Mull is the historic seat of the chief of the Clan Maclaine of Lochbuie.

Gillean's great-grandson, Iain Dubh, or Black John, had two sons, Eachin Reaganach (Hector the Stern), and Lachainn Lubanach (Lachlan the Wily). When the Gaelic Highlanders broke away from the Lowland monarchy in the 14th century, the MacLeans allied with the Lord of the Isles - receiving lands from John, Lord of the Isles, in exchange for their support. Lachlan married John's daughter, and he and his brother moved to the Isle of Mull in the Inner Hebrides, where the two dominant branches of the family were formed: the Maclaines of Lochbuie and the MacLeans of Duart (The Maclaines of Lochbuie used the "MacLean" spelling until the 17th century). Lachlan was the head of the Duart branch, with Hector being the head of the Lochbuie branch. Many of the clansmen at Lochbuie retained other spellings of Maclaine or MacLean, such as Maclayne, McClain, and McLain. Various smaller families intermarried or banded together with the Maclaines, and they were all accepted into the clan.

In about 1350, Hector was granted lands on the Isle of Mull by the Lords of the Isles. He also sat on the Council of the Isles as did subsequent chiefs of Lochbuie until the Lordship was forfeited in 1493. Hector built Moy Castle, a typical Scottish tower house at Lochbuie, Mull in the 14th century. It was built on land formerly held by the McFadzeans.

Once the MacLeans allied with the MacDonalds, they expanded beyond Lochbuie. Clan MacDonald, arguably the most powerful highland clan, became envious of the growing power of the MacLeans; and subsequently, the MacLeans - including the Maclaines of Lochbuie - feuded with the MacDonalds for many years.

=== 16th century ===
==== The Headless Horseman (Ewan The Headless) ====
One of the famous legends associated with the Clan Maclaine of Lochbuie is that of the headless horseman. Before 1538, Ewan, son of Iain Og, the fifth chief, lived on a cranog (artificial island) in Loch Sghubhain, north of Lochbuie. Ewan's wife (nicknamed the "black swan") constantly pressed him for more land off his father. This resulted in a heated argument between the father and son and a clan battle ensued. The two sides met at Glen Cannir and Iain Og was supported by the Clan Maclean of Duart. During the battle a swing of a claymore completely severed Ewan's head from his body and his horse kept galloping with his headless body held in place by the stirrups. The horse was eventually stopped and Ewan's body was buried on the island of Iona, where his grave can still be seen. The lands held by the sixth Lochbuie chief were united into the barony of Moy in 1542.

=== 17th century and Civil War ===
John Mor the seventh chief was renowned as an excellent swordsman and when an Italian master-at-arms challenged the Scottish nobles to meet him in a duel, John Mor accepted the challenge. John Mor fought and killed the Italian in the presence of the king and court. His son was Hector the eighth of Lochbuie who initiated the spelling of the surname as Maclaine which was the accepted spelling used by subsequent chiefs.

Historically Roman Catholic and proud to see a Scottish monarch on the throne, the Maclaines of Lochbuie, along with the MacLeans, fought on the side of the Royalists in the English Civil War against Oliver Cromwell and his Parliamentarians. Murdoch Mor, the tenth chief, fought for James Graham, 1st Marquis of Montrose in 1645 and as a result his lands were forfeited and not restored until 1661.

The twelfth chief, Hector, was the victor at the first battle of the Jacobite campaign of 1689 where he overcame five troops of horse sent by Hugh Mackay's army to intercept him. He also took part in the Battle of Killiecrankie where Mackay's forces were annihilated in the same year.

=== 18th century and Jacobite risings ===
The Maclaines of Lochbuie and other clans were persuaded by Duncan Forbes, Lord Culloden not to rise with Bonnie Prince Charlie in 1745. Thus the Maclaines and MacLeans were spared the ramifications that resulted throughout northern Scotland as a result of Charles's defeat at the Battle of Culloden. The Maclaines later converted to Presbyterianism as a result of the rising influence of that denomination in the lowlands.

During the American Revolution, many Highland regiments were raised in Scotland, and rarely one of them was formed that did not consist of a MacLean or a Maclaine. The period of colonization before the Revolution saw many Maclaines and MacLeans settle in the sandhills of eastern North Carolina, and these settlers were almost all British sympathizers during the war.

=== 19th century to present ===
The 22nd Chief Donald made a fortune in Java in the nineteenth century with which he cleared the estate of debt. The 24th Chief Kenneth Douglas Lorne [MC; Croix de Guerre with Palm] Lost the Lochbuie estates in controversial lawsuit resulting in final foreclosure in March 1922. The estate was sold in 1922 to Sir Richard Garton, descendants of whom still own and farm the estate. The current chief of the clan is The Much Honoured Lorne Gillean Ian McLaine formerly of Lochbuie, Baron of Moy. He is the 26th hereditary chief of the clan.

== Lands ==
Hector Maclaine received his lands in the Hebrides from John, Lord of the Isles around 1350. Hector chose to build his castle, Moy Castle, at the head of Lochbuie. Moy Castle was a beautiful Scottish towerhouse, and it remained the home of Maclaine chiefs until 1752, when Lochbuie House was built not far from the castle. Lochbuie House is a Georgian style house that sits just behind Moy Castle, overlooking Lochbuie. Moy Castle and Lochbuie House are still standing today, with Lochbuie House now owned by the Corbett family. Moy Castle is not accessible due to its old age, but remains a beautiful example of ancient medieval architecture. Over the years, the Lochbuie branch has held lands in Mull, Scarba, Jura, Morvern, Locheil, and Tiree. Lands were also granted in Duror and Glencoe but were never taken.

== Septs ==
Since most Scottish emigrants could not read or write, carried thick highland "brogues," and had trouble being understood, names might have been changed or misspelled. This makes it hard to pinpoint the clan that one's Scottish ancestors came from. Listed below are surnames that are associated with Clan MacLean, but more specifically, the Maclaines of Lochbuie (note that there are over 200 alternate spellings for these names):

McLean, Maclaine, McClain, McLain, MacLayne, MacLean, Lane, Laine, Lain, Layne, Lean, McFadyen, McFadzean, McFayden, MacFadden, MacFadyen, McPhadon, McFadzean, McPhadzean, Fadden, MacCormack, McCormick, Cormack, Cormick, MacGillivray, MacIlvora, MacBay, MacVay, MacAvoy, Avoy, MacEvoy, Evoy, MacFetridge, Patton, Patten, Paton, Peden, Douie, Huie, Beaton, Black, Clanachan, McSpadden

== Clan profile ==
=== Clan Crest ===
A branch of laurel and a branch of cypress in saltire, surmounted of a battleaxe in pale, all proper. The motto reads: "Vincere Vel Mori," Latin for "Conquer or Die."

=== Clan Plant ===
Blaeberry or "bramble"

=== Tartan ===
Maclaine Dress Tartan

Maclaine Hunting Tartan

=== Pìobaireachd ===
The clan's Pìobaireachd is Cumha Mhic Ghilleathain (Maclaine of Lochbuie's Lament).

The official website of the clan is www.clanmaclaine.org

== Clan Chiefs ==
Chief	Name	Birth	Death
1	Hector Reaganach Maclean, 1st Laird of Lochbuie	1330	1407
2	Murdoch MacLean, 2nd Laird of Lochbuie	-	-
3	John MacLean, 3rd Laird of Lochbuie	-	-
4	Hector MacLean, 4th Laird of Lochbuie	-	1478
5	John Og MacLean, 5th Laird of Lochbuie (Note: John Og, or young John, appears to have made a great figure in his time. He was of such prominence that James IV attempted to win him, and further appears to have been a favorite of that monarch. Previous to his lairdship the principal lands were those of Glenforsay and Moloras, held from the Lord of the Isles. Those of Lochiel were only nominally held.)	1470	1538
6	Murdoch	1496	1568
7	John	1559	1635
8	Hector MacLean of Lochbuie, 8th Chief	1555	1614
9	Hector MacLean of Lochbuie, 9th Chief	1575	1628
10	Murdoch Mor MacLean of Lochbuie, 10th Chief	-	1662
11	Lachlan	1614	1685
12	Hector MacLean of Lochbuie, 12th Chief	1697	1706
13	Murdoch	-	1727
14	John	-	1741
15	Lachlan	-	1743
16	Hector MacLean of Lochbuie, 16th Chief	-	1745
17	John	1700	1778
18	Archibald	1749	1784
19	Murdoch	1730	1804
20	Murdoch	1791	1818
21	Murdoch	1814	1850
22	Donald	1816	1863
23	Murdoch	1845	1909
24	Kenneth Douglas Lorne Maclaine	1880	1935
25	Gillean Robert Maclaine	1921	1970
26	Lorne Gillean Iain Maclaine	1945	-
27	Angus Gillean Mathew Maclaine (Younger)	1975	-
