= Earl of Godolphin =

English peerage

Earldom of Godolphin
- Gules, an eagle with two heads displayed between three fleurs-de-lys two and one argent
- Creation date: 29 December 1706
- Created by: Queen Anne
- Peerage: Peerage of England
- First holder: Sidney Godolphin, 1st Baron Godolphin
- Last holder: Francis Godolphin, 2nd Earl of Godolphin
- Subsidiary titles: Baron Godolphin
- Status: Extinct
- Extinction date: 17 January 1766
- Seat: Godolphin House
- Motto: Franc ha leal eto ge ("Frank and loyal thou art")

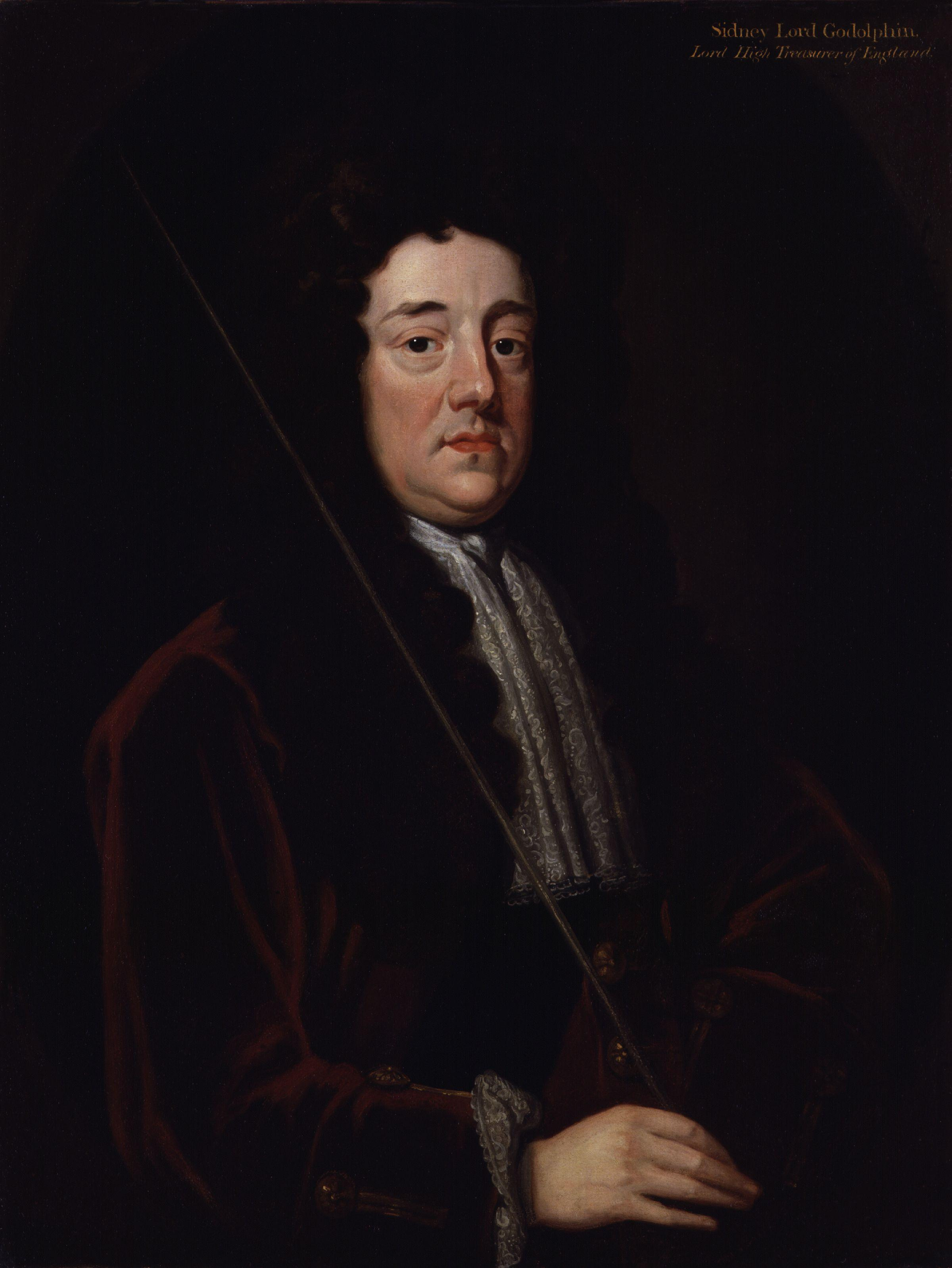
The 1st Earl of Godolphin, painted by Sir Godfrey Kneller

Earl of Godolphin was a title in the Peerage of England. It was created in 1706 for Sidney Godolphin, 1st Baron Godolphin, the Lord High Treasurer. At the same time, he was created Viscount Rialton. In 1684 he had already been created Baron Godolphin, of Rialton, also in the Peerage of England. He was a leading politician of the late seventeenth and early eighteenth centuries, a Knight of the Garter and Governor of Scilly. Upon his death in 1712, his titles passed to his only child, Francis.

This 2nd Earl of Godolphin married Henrietta, 2nd Duchess of Marlborough. Their only son, William Godolphin, Marquess of Blandford, was childless and predeceased both his parents. In 1735 the 2nd Earl was created Baron Godolphin, of Helston, in the Peerage of Great Britain, with remainder, in default of male issue of his own, to the male issue of his deceased uncle Henry Godolphin, Dean of St Paul's. When the 2nd Earl died in 1766, the Godolphin earldom, the Rialton viscounty, and the Godolphin barony of 1684 became extinct; but the Godolphin barony of 1735 devolved upon his cousin Francis Godolphin, 2nd Baron Godolphin.

The ancestral seat of the Godolphin family was Godolphin House near Helston in Cornwall. The family took a close interest in mining and a number of mines were founded on their land. At Wheal Vor they experimented with several new inventions (for instance, the Newcomen engine in 1715) to improve the working of their mines.

== Earls of Godolphin (1706) ==
- Sidney Godolphin, 1st Earl of Godolphin (1645–1712)
- Francis Godolphin, 2nd Earl of Godolphin (1678–1766)
  - William Godolphin, Marquess of Blandford (c. 1700–1731)

== Family tree ==
Dukes of Leeds family tree

John Danvers; 1540–1594
Osborne Baronets, of Kiveton, 1620	Baron Danvers, of Dauntsey in the County of Wiltshire, 1603; Earl of Danby in the County of York (1st creation), 1626
Edward Osborne; 1596–1647; 1st Baronet	Eleanor Danvers	Henry Danvers; 1573–1644; Earl of Danby, etc.
Earldom of Danby (1st creation) extinct, 1644
Anne Walmesley
Viscount Osborne of Dunblane, Baron Osborne of Kiveton in the County of York, and Viscount Latimer of Danby in the County of York, 1673; Earl of Danby (2nd creation) in the County of York, 1674; Marquess of Carmarthen, 1689; Duke of Leeds, 1694
Thomas Osborne; 1632–1712; 1st Duke of Leeds, etc., 2nd Baronet
Viscounty of Osborne surrendered, 1674
Baron Godolphin of Rialton in the County of Cornwall (1st creation), 1684; Earl of Godolphin and Viscount Rialton, 1706
Edward Osborne; 1655–1689 styled Viscount Latimer	Peregrine Osborne; 1659–1729; 2nd Duke of Leeds, etc.	Sidney Godolphin; 1645–1712; 1st Earl of Godolphin, etc.	Henry Godolphin; 1648–1733
Baron Godolphin of Helston in the County of Cornwall (2nd creation), 1735
Peregrine Hyde Osborne; 1691–1731; 3rd Duke of Leeds, etc.	Francis Godolphin; 1678–1766; 2nd Earl of Godolphin, etc. 1st Baron Godolphin (of Helston)	Francis Godolphin; 1706–1785; 2nd Baron Godolphin (of Helston)
Earldom of Godolphin, viscounty of Rialton, and barony of Godolphin, extinct, 1766	Godolphin barony of Helston, extinct, 1785
Thomas Osborne; 1713–1789; 4th Duke of Leeds, etc.	Mary Godolphin; 1723–1764
Thomas Osborne; 1747 styled Marquess of Carmarthen	Francis Godolphin Osborne; 1751–1799; 5th Duke of Leeds, etc.
Baron Godolphin of Farnham Royal in the County of Buckingham (3rd creation), 1832
George William Frederick Osborne; 1775–1838; 6th Duke of Leeds, etc., 10th Baron Conyers, de jure 13th Baron Darcy de Knayth	Francis Godolphin Osborne; 1777–1850; 1st Baron Godolphin (of Farnham Royal)
Francis Godolphin D'Arcy D'Arcy-Osborne; 1798–1859; 7th Duke of Leeds, etc., 11th Baron Conyers, de jure 14th Baron Darcy de Knayth	George Godolphin Osborne; 1802–1872; 8th Duke of Leeds, etc., 2nd Baron Godolphin (of Farnham Royal)	Sydney Godolphin Osborne; 1808–1889
George Godolphin Osborne; 1828–1895; 9th Duke of Leeds, etc., 3rd Baron Godolphin (of Farnham Royal)	Sidney Francis Godolphin Osborne; 1835–1903
George Frederick Osborne; 1861 styled Earl of Danby	George Godolphin Osborne; 1862–1927; 10th Duke of Leeds, etc., 4th Baron Godolphin (of Farnham Royal)
John Francis Godolphin Osborne; 1901–1963; 11th Duke of Leeds, etc., 6th Baron Godolphin (of Farnham Royal)	Francis D'Arcy Godolphin Osborne; 1884–1964; 12th Duke of Leeds, etc., 5th Baron Godolphin (of Farnham Royal)
Dukedom extinct, 1964

== See also ==
- Baron Godolphin
