= Harriet Osborne, Baroness Godolphin =

British noblewoman

The Right Honourable The Baroness Godolphin
- Born: Harriet Arundel Stewart (illegitimate); 17 August 1800
- Died: 28 October 1852 (aged 52); Stapleford, Cambridgeshire
- Title: Baroness Godolphin
- Spouse: George Osborne, 8th Duke of Leeds (m. 1824)
- Children: 11, including George Osborne, 9th Duke of Leeds
- Parent(s): Granville Leveson-Gower, 1st Earl Granville; Henrietta Ponsonby, Countess of Bessborough (illegitimate)

Harriet Osborne, Baroness Godolphin (née Arundel Stewart; 17 August 1800 – 28 October 1852) was a British noblewoman. An illegitimate child, her mother was the society figure Henrietta Ponsonby, Countess of Bessborough, who became pregnant by her longtime lover Lord Granville Leveson-Gower. Henrietta gave birth to the girl in secret and sent her to be raised by a foster mother, though she stayed in contact through letters and gifts.

At the age of twelve, Harriet joined her father’s household in Staffordshire and was included as part of his family. After accompanying him to the Netherlands, she met and married Hon. George Osborne in 1824 with whom she had eleven children, but she died before her husband became the 8th Duke of Leeds, which would have made Harriet "Duchess of Leeds".

== Birth and early life ==
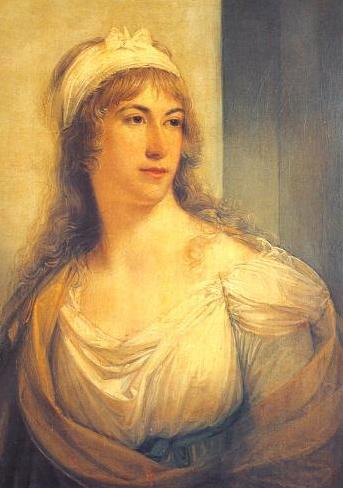
Harriet's mother, the Countess of Bessborough, never revealed her true identity to her daughter.

The circumstances surrounding Harriet's illegitimate birth involved much secrecy. By the end of 1799, Henrietta Ponsonby, Countess of Bessborough had discovered she was pregnant by her longtime lover, Granville Leveson-Gower. The consequences of such an event could be potentially disastrous; eight years earlier, Lady Bessborough had witnessed the scandal and emotional turmoil experienced by her sister Georgiana, Duchess of Devonshire, when her own illegitimate child had been born. Lady Bessborough was also terrified that her husband would discover the truth and divorce her. Undoubtedly aided by the era's empire waist fashions, she succeeded in hiding the pregnancy from him – only a few close family members and friends were made aware.

The child, Harriette Arundel Stewart, was born on 17 August 1800; her given surname was inspired by Lady Bessborough's pet name for Leveson-Gower, and by the maiden name of his mother Susanna Stewart. To her lasting sorrow, social constraints prevented her from openly acknowledging the child. Illegitimate children were increasingly disapproved of in English society; worrying about her daughter's future, Lady Bessborough arranged for her to be raised by a foster mother. Another illegitimate sibling, George Arundel Stewart, was born two years later in similar circumstances.

Both parents remained in close contact with their children and monitored their progress. Though they lived apart, the Countess sought to be involved in her daughter's life, serving as a sort of godmother to the child. Lady Bessborough wrote frequently to her, though most of these letters were later destroyed. One of the few surviving letters reveals that when the girl was two years old, her mother purchased a locket and asked Leveson-Gower for a piece of his hair in which to send to their daughter.

Harriet's life changed quite significantly in August 1812, when she was brought to live in her father's household at Tixall Hall in Staffordshire. At first this was meant to be a temporary visit, but Leveson-Gower's new wife Lady Harriet, who was a niece of her mother and first cousin to Harriet, took to the girl and wished her to stay, describing her as "a most amiable little creature and though she has nothing precose about her, her intelligence and docility make her a very delightful companion." "Little Harriet", as she was known, was loved and included as one of the family, which contained five younger half-siblings as well as her brother George Arundel Stewart. She was never informed of her true parentage, and referred to Leveson-Gower as "her guardian."

== Marriage and later life ==
In 1824, Harriet and the rest of the family moved to Brussels upon the appointment of Leveson-Gower, now Viscount Granville, as British ambassador to The Hague. Talks of finding a husband for Harriet began, and she was given lessons on etiquette from a dancing master. Viscountess Granville worried that her charge's marriage prospects would face difficulties, namely due to her mysterious status as a ward and lack of a dowry. The girl had many positive qualities, however; the historian Janet Gleeson describes Harriet as "well-mannered and physically attractive to the opposite sex."

While in the Netherlands, Harriet met Hon. George Osborne, the son of Francis Osborne, 1st Baron Godolphin and first cousin to the 7th Duke of Leeds who had no issue, thus he became the heir to the dukedom of Leeds. Granville and Baron Godolphin eventually gave their consent, and the couple were married at the British Embassy in Paris on 21 October 1824. The newly married couple took up residence in the Bois de Boulogne, where they were enthusiastically welcomed by French society.

Osborne and Harriet faced constant financial problems, living far beyond their means to the point of almost being jailed. Harriet and her brother, George Arundel Stewart, were both hopeless with money. This is a trait they inherited from their mother. Although George Arundel Stewart debt was far less than Harriet’s debt, George Arundel Stewart's debt was at times about £800. In times like this, Harriet would turn to her brother for help, and George Arundel Stewart would report this matter to their father, who would step in to help Harriet out. Her father and guardian, now 1st Earl Granville, could usually be depended on to help with their debts, to Harriet's embarrassment. In one letter, she wrote to him, "I can never be sufficiently grateful to you for the kindness you have again shown me and for the generosity with which you have again relieved our great difficulties. I feel much shame at our having brought these difficulties upon ourselves again."

George Arundel Stewart's life remains more mysterious. George Arundel Stewart travelled a lot and would bring gifts, Indian turbans, shawls, fans, and a chess set, from Asia and India. George Arundel Stewart was personable and sociable. Yet, he never married, and his half-siblings adore him. When the family was about to disembark from Ramsgate, George Arundel Stewart would wrap his coat to around his siblings and carry his siblings along the pier to the inn. George Arundel Stewart became his father’s private secretary. They were fond of each other and travel together for six months in Spain in 1847. George Arundel Stewart died in 1875.

Osborne inherited his father's title of Baron Godolphin in 1850, making Harriet Baroness Godolphin, known as "Lady Godolphin". She died at the family home in Stapleford, Cambridgeshire, on 28 October 1852, seven years before Osborne succeeded his first cousin as the 8th Duke of Leeds, had she lived longer, Harriet would have been titled "Her grace, the Duchess of Leeds".

Osborne did not marry again and died on 8 August 1872, after which their eldest surviving son George Godolphin succeeded to the dukedom. A hatchment of the Duke's arms on his death survives; unusually, for a Duke, his wife is shown as having no right to inherit her own coat of arms (because of her illegitimate birth) and yet this is not glossed over by omitting the place for her arms on the hatchment. Instead, the hatchment shows decorative swirls on the wife's side (the right-hand side) of the shield of arms where her own paternal arms would otherwise have been.

=== Issue ===
They had eleven children, though three died in early childhood:

1. Harriet Emma Godolphin Osborne (5 September 1825 – 14 August 1832)
2. George Francis Godolphin Osborne (7 March 1827 – 7 April 1828)
3. George Godolphin Osborne, 9th Duke of Leeds (11 August 1828 – 23 December 1895); married the Honourable Frances Georgiana Pitt-Rivers, daughter of George Pitt-Rivers, 4th Baron Rivers.
4. Reverend Lord Francis George Godolphin Osborne (6 April 1830 – 6 March 1907); married Matilda Catherine Rich and had issue.
5. Lady Susan Georgina Godolphin Osborne (6 April 1830 – 14 November 1903); married Henry John Milbank, son of Mark Milbank.
6. Granville Theodore Godolphin Osborne (27 November 1831 – 10 January 1833)
7. Major Lord D'Arcy Godolphin Osborne (14 June 1834 – 20 March 1895)
8. Lord William Godolphin Osborne (28 August 1835 – 28 December 1888); married Mary Catherine Headly and had issue.
9. Lady Emma Charlotte Godolphin Osborne (1837 – 24 May 1906); a Lady of the Bedchamber to the Duchess of Edinburgh.
10. Lady Charlotte Godolphin Osborne (1838 – 25 March 1914)
11. Lady Blanche Godolphin Osborne (1842 – 13 February 1917); married Major-General Charles Henry Morris, a grandson of Sir John Morris, 1st Baronet.
