= George Osborne, 9th Duke of Leeds =

British peer (1828–1895)

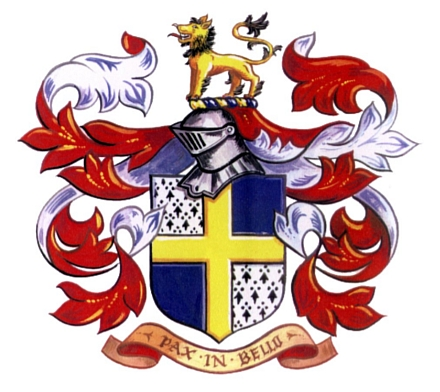
- Ancestral arms of the Osborne family, Dukes of Leeds
- Born: 11 August 1828; Paris, France
- Died: 23 December 1895 (aged 67)
- Spouse: Frances Pitt-Rivers (m. 1861)
- Children: 9, including George
- Parents: George Osborne (father); Harriet Stewart (mother)
- Relatives: Francis Osborne (grandfather); Granville Leveson-Gower (grandfather); Henrietta Ponsonby (grandmother)
- Military career
- Rank: Captain
- Unit: North York Rifle Militia

George Godolphin Osborne, 9th Duke of Leeds (11 August 1828 – 23 December 1895), was a British peer.

== Life ==
Born in Paris, France, he was the son of the 8th Duke of Leeds and his wife Harriet Emma Arundel née Stewart, illegitimate daughter of 1st Earl Granville. From 1852 to 1861 he was a Captain in the revived North York Rifle Militia, at that time commanded by the 7th Duke of Leeds. In 1872, he succeeded to his father's titles.

=== Marriage and children ===
On 16 January 1861, he married the Honourable Frances Georgiana Pitt-Rivers, daughter of George Pitt-Rivers, 4th Baron Rivers, and Lady Susan Georgiana Leveson-Gower, daughter of 1st Earl Granville.

The couple were half first cousins and second cousins once removed at the same time, since their mothers were half-sisters through their father Granville Leveson-Gower, 1st Earl Granville, who had George's mother Harriet secretly with his lover Henrietta Ponsonby, Countess of Bessborough, before marrying her niece Harriet Leveson-Gower, Countess Granville, and having legitimate children, including Frances Georgiana's mother Susan, with her.

The Osbornes had nine children:

- George Frederick Osborne, Earl of Danby (4 November 1861 – 6 November 1861).
- George Godolphin Osborne, 10th Duke of Leeds (18 September 1862 – 10 May 1927).
- Captain Lord Francis Granville Godolphin Osborne (11 March 1864 – 17 October 1924) married on 25 Nov 1896 to Blanche Ruth Brooke Tatton Greive, daughter of Vice-Admiral William Samuel Greive and Flora Robertson.
- Lord Albert Edward Godolphin Osborne (10 April 1866 – 30 June 1914).
- Lady Harriet Castalia Godolphin Osborne (28 July 1867 – 16 June 1922) married on 10 July 1888 to Captain Henry Frederick Compton Cavendish. They had four children:
  - Emily Georgiana Harriet Cavendish (22 December 1890 – 23 December 1976).
  - Evelyn Alice Beatrix Cavendish (30 July 1892 – ?).
  - Commander Henry James Francis Cavendish (17 August 1893 – 30 June 1956).
  - Lt.-Cdr. George Sidney Godolphin Cavendish (3 December 1895 – ?).
- Lady Alice Susan Godolphin Osborne (17 May 1869 – 16 March 1951) married on 7 Aug 1894 to William Francis Egerton, son of Admiral Hon. Francis Egerton and Lady Louisa Caroline Cavendish. She had one child:
  - Captain Francis Egerton (17 January 1896 – 8 June 1935).
- Lady Ada Charlotte Godolphin Osborne (30 May 1870 – 9 April 1944). She was married, firstly, on 18 Oct 1901 to Hon. William Hugh Spencer Wentworth FitzWilliam (10 Jan 1860 – 28 Mar 1917), son of William Wentworth-Fitzwilliam, 6th Earl Fitzwilliam, and Lady Frances Harriet Douglas. She was married, secondly, on 14 Dec 1922 to Sir Harry Robert Boyd, son of Robert Boyd.
- Lady Alexandra Louisa Godolphin Osborne (20 February 1872 – 19 January 1938). She was married, firstly, on 16 January 1906 to Lt.-Col. Sir Cecil Paget, 2nd Bt., son of Lt.-Col. Sir George Paget, 1st Bt., and Sofia Holden. The marriage dissolved in 1925. She was married, secondly, on 20 January 1928 to Alfred William Sharpe Pocklington.
- Constance Blanche Godolphin Osborne (8 June 1875 – 18 July 1939) married Sir Ernest Hatch, 1st Bt. She had one child:
  - Marjorie Helen Ruth Hatch (birth registered in Hendon, Middlesex, in the first quarter of 1902).

== Property ==
The Leeds's owned property in west Cornwall and visited (probably for the first time) in May 1882. They included the Grade I listed Godolphin House and the fortified manor house, Pengersick Castle, Praa Sands.

Peerage of England
Preceded by George Osborne	Duke of Leeds; 1872–1895	Succeeded by George Osborne
