= Baron Godolphin =

Barony in the Peerage of Great Britain

Baron Godolphin is a title that was created three times: first in the Peerage of England, next in the Peerage of Great Britain, and then in the Peerage of the United Kingdom.

The first creation, as Baron Godolphin, of Rialton in the County of Cornwall, was in the Peerage of England in September 1684 for Sidney Godolphin, a leading politician of the late seventeenth and early eighteenth centuries and former MP for Helston in Cornwall. In 1704 he was made a Knight of the Garter, and in December 1706 he was created Viscount Rialton and Earl of Godolphin. Upon his death in 1712, all these titles passed to his son Francis.

The second creation, as Baron Godolphin, of Helston in the County of Cornwall, was in the Peerage of Great Britain in 1735 for Francis Godolphin, 2nd Earl of Godolphin, with remainder, in default of male issue of his own, to the male issue of his deceased uncle Henry Godolphin, the Dean of St Paul's. The 2nd Earl died on 17 January 1766. The Godolphin earldom, the Rialton viscounty, and Godolphin barony of 1684 became extinct; but the Godolphin barony of 1735 devolved according to the special remainder upon his cousin Francis Godolphin, 2nd Baron Godolphin. He had previously represented Helston in the House of Commons. On his death in 1785 this title became extinct as well.

The third creation, as Baron Godolphin, of Farnham Royal in the County of Buckingham, was in the Peerage of the United Kingdom on 14 May 1832 for Lord Francis Osborne, the second son of Francis Osborne, 5th Duke of Leeds. His grandmother was Lady Mary Godolphin, daughter of 2nd Earl of Godolphin, who had married Thomas Osborne, 4th Duke of Leeds. On Lord Godolphin's death in 1850, the barony passed to his eldest son George, who also inherited the dukedom of Leeds from his cousin in 1859. The Godolphin barony of 1832 and the dukedom of Leeds remained united until the death of Sir D'Arcy Osborne, 12th Duke of Leeds in 1964, when both titles became extinct.

== Barons Godolphin: First creation (1684) ==
- Sidney Godolphin, 1st Earl of Godolphin, 1st Baron Godolphin (1645–1712)
- Francis Godolphin, 2nd Earl of Godolphin, 2nd Baron Godolphin (1678–1766) (created Baron Godolphin in 1735)

== Barons Godolphin: Second creation (1735) ==
- Francis Godolphin, 2nd Earl of Godolphin, 1st Baron Godolphin (1678–1766)
- Francis Godolphin, 2nd Baron Godolphin (1707–1785)

== Barons Godolphin; Third creation (1832) ==
- Francis Godolphin Osborne, 1st Baron Godolphin (1777–1850)
- George Godolphin Osborne, 2nd Baron Godolphin (1802–1872) (succeeded as Duke of Leeds in 1859)

== Family tree ==
Dukes of Leeds family tree

John Danvers; 1540–1594
Osborne Baronets, of Kiveton, 1620	Baron Danvers, of Dauntsey in the County of Wiltshire, 1603; Earl of Danby in the County of York (1st creation), 1626
Edward Osborne; 1596–1647; 1st Baronet	Eleanor Danvers	Henry Danvers; 1573–1644; Earl of Danby, etc.
Earldom of Danby (1st creation) extinct, 1644
Anne Walmesley
Viscount Osborne of Dunblane, Baron Osborne of Kiveton in the County of York, and Viscount Latimer of Danby in the County of York, 1673; Earl of Danby (2nd creation) in the County of York, 1674; Marquess of Carmarthen, 1689; Duke of Leeds, 1694
Thomas Osborne; 1632–1712; 1st Duke of Leeds, etc., 2nd Baronet
Viscounty of Osborne surrendered, 1674
Baron Godolphin of Rialton in the County of Cornwall (1st creation), 1684; Earl of Godolphin and Viscount Rialton, 1706
Edward Osborne; 1655–1689 styled Viscount Latimer	Peregrine Osborne; 1659–1729; 2nd Duke of Leeds, etc.	Sidney Godolphin; 1645–1712; 1st Earl of Godolphin, etc.	Henry Godolphin; 1648–1733
Baron Godolphin of Helston in the County of Cornwall (2nd creation), 1735
Peregrine Hyde Osborne; 1691–1731; 3rd Duke of Leeds, etc.	Francis Godolphin; 1678–1766; 2nd Earl of Godolphin, etc. 1st Baron Godolphin (of Helston)	Francis Godolphin; 1706–1785; 2nd Baron Godolphin (of Helston)
Earldom of Godolphin, viscounty of Rialton, and barony of Godolphin, extinct, 1766	Godolphin barony of Helston, extinct, 1785
Thomas Osborne; 1713–1789; 4th Duke of Leeds, etc.	Mary Godolphin; 1723–1764
Thomas Osborne; 1747 styled Marquess of Carmarthen	Francis Godolphin Osborne; 1751–1799; 5th Duke of Leeds, etc.
Baron Godolphin of Farnham Royal in the County of Buckingham (3rd creation), 1832
George William Frederick Osborne; 1775–1838; 6th Duke of Leeds, etc., 10th Baron Conyers, de jure 13th Baron Darcy de Knayth	Francis Godolphin Osborne; 1777–1850; 1st Baron Godolphin (of Farnham Royal)
Francis Godolphin D'Arcy D'Arcy-Osborne; 1798–1859; 7th Duke of Leeds, etc., 11th Baron Conyers, de jure 14th Baron Darcy de Knayth	George Godolphin Osborne; 1802–1872; 8th Duke of Leeds, etc., 2nd Baron Godolphin (of Farnham Royal)	Sydney Godolphin Osborne; 1808–1889
George Godolphin Osborne; 1828–1895; 9th Duke of Leeds, etc., 3rd Baron Godolphin (of Farnham Royal)	Sidney Francis Godolphin Osborne; 1835–1903
George Frederick Osborne; 1861 styled Earl of Danby	George Godolphin Osborne; 1862–1927; 10th Duke of Leeds, etc., 4th Baron Godolphin (of Farnham Royal)
John Francis Godolphin Osborne; 1901–1963; 11th Duke of Leeds, etc., 6th Baron Godolphin (of Farnham Royal)	Francis D'Arcy Godolphin Osborne; 1884–1964; 12th Duke of Leeds, etc., 5th Baron Godolphin (of Farnham Royal)
Dukedom extinct, 1964
