= Duke of Leeds =

Dukedom in the Peerage of England

Dukedom of Leeds
- Quarterly, 1st & 4th: quarterly ermine and azure, over all a cross or (for Osborne); 2nd, gules, an eagle with two heads display, between three fleur-de-lis argent (for Godolphin); 3rd, azure, semé of cross-crosslets and three cinquefoils argent (for D'Arcy)
- Creation date: 4 May 1694
- Created by: William III and Mary II
- Peerage: Peerage of England
- First holder: Thomas Osborne, 1st Duke of Leeds
- Last holder: D'Arcy Osborne, 12th Duke of Leeds
- Remainder to: the first Duke's heirs male of the body lawfully begotten
- Subsidiary titles: Marquess of Carmarthen; Earl of Danby; Viscount Osborne; Viscount Latimer; Viscount Dunblane; Baron Godolphin
- Extinction date: 20 March 1964
- Seat: Hornby Castle
- Former seat: Kiveton Hall

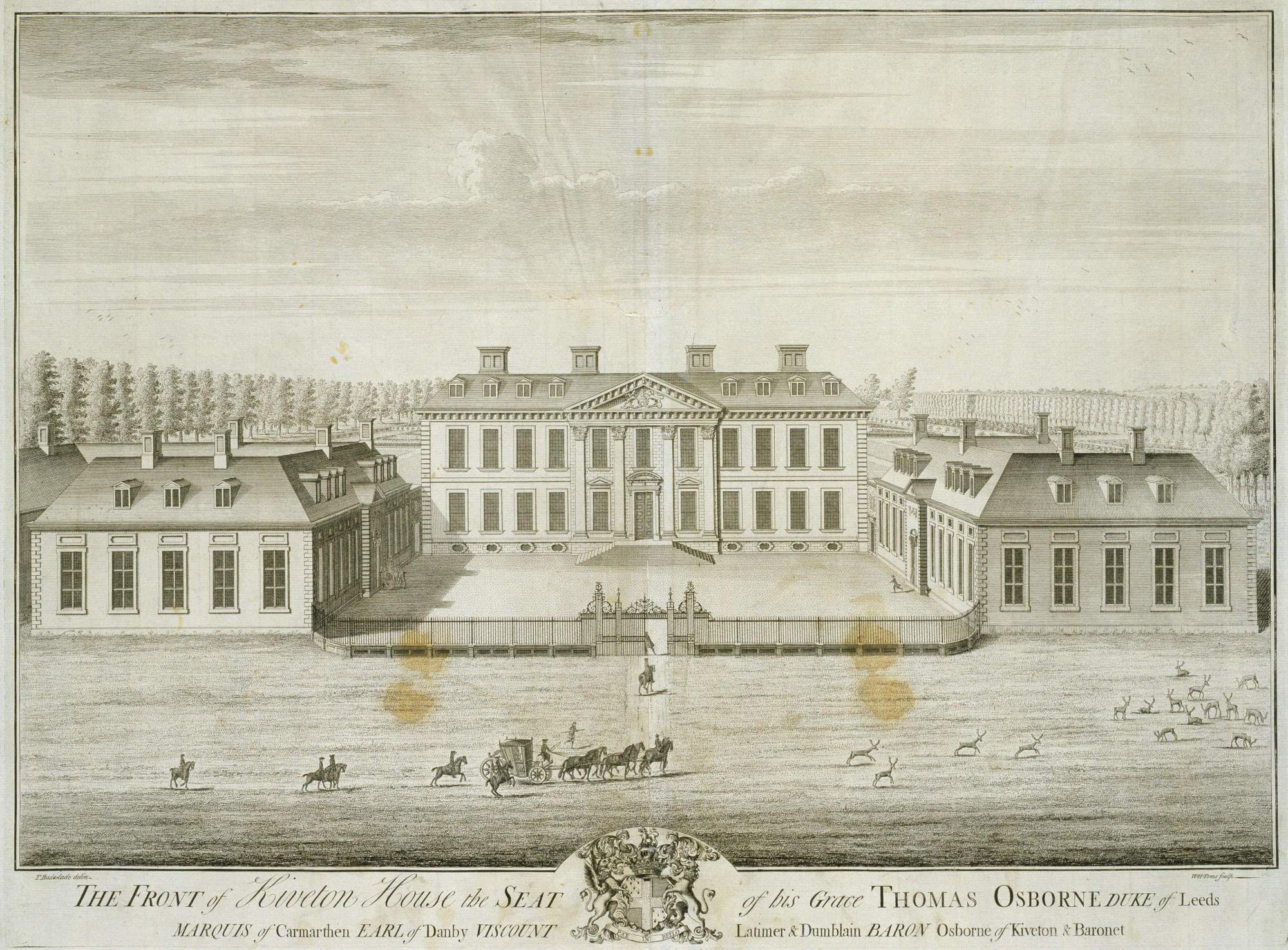
Kiveton Hall

Duke of Leeds was a title in the Peerage of England. It was created in 1694 for the prominent statesman Thomas Osborne, 1st Marquess of Carmarthen, who had been one of the Immortal Seven in the Revolution of 1688. He had already succeeded as 2nd Baronet, of Kiveton (1647) and been created Viscount Osborne, of Dunblane (1673), Baron Osborne, of Kiveton in the County of York (also 1673) and Viscount Latimer, of Danby in the County of York (also 1673), Earl of Danby, in the County of York (1674), and Marquess of Carmarthen (1689). All these titles were in the Peerage of England, except for the viscountcy of Osborne, which was in the Peerage of Scotland. (Note: Some sources indicate that Osborne held two Scottish viscountcies – "of Osborne" and "of Dunblane", although this may be a confusion of the full form "Osborne of Dunblane".) He resigned the latter title in favour of his son in 1673. The Earldom of Danby was a revival of the title held by his great-uncle, Henry Danvers, 1st Earl of Danby (see Earl of Danby).

== History ==
The Dukedom was named for Leeds in Yorkshire, and did not (as is sometimes claimed) refer to Leeds Castle in Kent.

The 4th Duke married Mary Godolphin, daughter of Henrietta Churchill Godolphin, suo jure Duchess of Marlborough, and The 2nd Earl of Godolphin, and assumed the arms of Godolphin and Churchill.

On 8 August 1849, The 7th Duke of Leeds assumed by royal licence the additional surname and arms of D'Arcy, for the separate baronies of D'Arcy (1322) and Conyers that he inherited through his grandmother.

Upon the death of the 7th Duke in 1859, the dukedom passed to his cousin, The 2nd Baron Godolphin, whose father (the second son of The 5th Duke of Leeds) had been created Baron Godolphin, of Farnham Royal in the County of Buckingham, in 1832.

The 11th Duke was married three times; he had a daughter, Lady Camilla Osborne, but no son. Upon his death in 1963, the dukedom passed to his cousin, Sir D'Arcy Osborne, a diplomat. Eight months later, the 12th Duke died in Rome, unmarried, at which point the dukedom and the Barony of Godolphin became extinct.

The heir apparent to the Duke of Leeds was styled Marquess of Carmarthen; Lord Carmarthen's heir apparent was styled Earl of Danby; and Lord Danby's heir apparent was styled Viscount Latimer.

=== Estates and residences ===
The principal ducal seat was Kiveton Hall. After Kiveton Hall was demolished in 1811, Hornby Castle became the main seat of the Dukes of Leeds.

In the 1883 edition of John Bateman's The Great Landowners of Great Britain and Ireland, George Osborne, 9th Duke of Leeds's estates were recorded as spanning 24,237 acres across England, including 14,772 acres in the North Riding and West Riding of Yorkshire, 5,911 acres in Cornwall, 3,117 acres in Buckinghamshire, 436 acres in Cambridgeshire, and 1 acre in Middlesex, which produced a combined annual income of £33,381.

George Osborne, 10th Duke of Leeds Duke died in 1927, and approximately £300,000 in death duties were levied on his £730,000 estate. The combination of estate tax and the 10th Duke's significant gambling debts resulted in his son John Osborne, 11th Duke of Leeds selling the Hornby Castle estate for £250,000 in early 1930. A demolition sale of much of the house's contents was held in June 1930 and realised £15,000.

The traditional burial place of the Dukes of Leeds was All Hallows Church, Harthill, South Yorkshire.

==== London residences ====
George Osborne, 8th Duke of Leeds maintained a London home in Portman Square prior to his death in 1872. His son George Osborne, 9th Duke of Leeds leased No. 14 South Audley Street, Mayfair from 1874 until early 1877. By May 1877 the 9th Duke had taken a lease of No. 11 Grosvenor Crescent in Belgravia, which continued to be the London residences of the Dukes of Leeds until George Osborne, 10th Duke of Leeds died there in May 1927, although an unsuccessful attempt was made to sell the remaining lease of the house at auction in September 1919. The 10th Duke's widow Katherine, Duchess of Leeds sold much of the house's contents in early 1928, and by 1930 the house was being used as accommodation for members of the Duke of York's household.

== Osborne Baronets, of Kiveton (1620) ==
- Sir Edward Osborne, 1st Baronet (1596–1647)
- Sir Thomas Osborne, 2nd Baronet (1632–1712) (created Viscount Osborne in 1673, Earl of Danby in 1674, Marquess of Carmarthen in 1689 and Duke of Leeds in 1694)

== Dukes of Leeds (1694) ==
- Thomas Osborne, 1st Duke of Leeds (1632–1712)
  - Edward Osborne, Viscount Latimer (1655–1689), eldest son of the 1st Duke, died without surviving issue
- Peregrine Osborne, 2nd Duke of Leeds (1659–1729), second son of the 1st Duke
- Peregrine Hyde Osborne, 3rd Duke of Leeds (1691–1731), only son of the 2nd Duke
- Thomas Osborne, 4th Duke of Leeds (1713–1789), only son of the 3rd Duke
  - Thomas Osborne, Marquess of Carmarthen (1747), eldest son of the 4th Duke, died during his father's lifetime
- Francis Godolphin Osborne, 5th Duke of Leeds (1751–1799), third son of the 4th Duke

Other titles (6th & 7th Dukes): Baron Darcy de Knayth (1322) and Baron Conyers (1509)

- George William Frederick Osborne, 6th Duke of Leeds (1775–1838), eldest son of the 5th Duke
- Francis George Godolphin D'Arcy D'Arcy-Osborne, 7th Duke of Leeds (1798–1859), eldest son of the 6th Duke, died without issue

Other titles (8th Duke onwards): Baron Godolphin (1832)

- George Godolphin Osborne, 8th Duke of Leeds (1802–1872), eldest son of the 5th Duke's second son, The Lord Godolphin
- George Godolphin Osborne, 9th Duke of Leeds (1828–1895), eldest son of the 8th Duke
  - George Osborne, Earl of Danby (1861), eldest son of the 9th Duke (then Lord Carmarthen), died in infancy during his grandfather's lifetime
- George Godolphin Osborne, 10th Duke of Leeds (1862–1927), second son of the 9th Duke
- John Francis Godolphin Osborne, 11th Duke of Leeds (1901–1963), only son of the 10th Duke, died without male issue
- Francis D'Arcy Godolphin Osborne, 12th Duke of Leeds (1884–1964), grandson of Lord Godolphin's third son, died without issue, at which point all of his titles became extinct

== Family tree ==
Dukes of Leeds family tree

John Danvers; 1540–1594
Osborne Baronets, of Kiveton, 1620	Baron Danvers, of Dauntsey in the County of Wiltshire, 1603; Earl of Danby in the County of York (1st creation), 1626
Edward Osborne; 1596–1647; 1st Baronet	Eleanor Danvers	Henry Danvers; 1573–1644; Earl of Danby, etc.
Earldom of Danby (1st creation) extinct, 1644
Anne Walmesley
Viscount Osborne of Dunblane, Baron Osborne of Kiveton in the County of York, and Viscount Latimer of Danby in the County of York, 1673; Earl of Danby (2nd creation) in the County of York, 1674; Marquess of Carmarthen, 1689; Duke of Leeds, 1694
Thomas Osborne; 1632–1712; 1st Duke of Leeds, etc., 2nd Baronet
Viscounty of Osborne surrendered, 1674
Baron Godolphin of Rialton in the County of Cornwall (1st creation), 1684; Earl of Godolphin and Viscount Rialton, 1706
Edward Osborne; 1655–1689 styled Viscount Latimer	Peregrine Osborne; 1659–1729; 2nd Duke of Leeds, etc.	Sidney Godolphin; 1645–1712; 1st Earl of Godolphin, etc.	Henry Godolphin; 1648–1733
Baron Godolphin of Helston in the County of Cornwall (2nd creation), 1735
Peregrine Hyde Osborne; 1691–1731; 3rd Duke of Leeds, etc.	Francis Godolphin; 1678–1766; 2nd Earl of Godolphin, etc. 1st Baron Godolphin (of Helston)	Francis Godolphin; 1706–1785; 2nd Baron Godolphin (of Helston)
Earldom of Godolphin, viscounty of Rialton, and barony of Godolphin, extinct, 1766	Godolphin barony of Helston, extinct, 1785
Thomas Osborne; 1713–1789; 4th Duke of Leeds, etc.	Mary Godolphin; 1723–1764
Thomas Osborne; 1747 styled Marquess of Carmarthen	Francis Godolphin Osborne; 1751–1799; 5th Duke of Leeds, etc.
Baron Godolphin of Farnham Royal in the County of Buckingham (3rd creation), 1832
George William Frederick Osborne; 1775–1838; 6th Duke of Leeds, etc., 10th Baron Conyers, de jure 13th Baron Darcy de Knayth	Francis Godolphin Osborne; 1777–1850; 1st Baron Godolphin (of Farnham Royal)
Francis Godolphin D'Arcy D'Arcy-Osborne; 1798–1859; 7th Duke of Leeds, etc., 11th Baron Conyers, de jure 14th Baron Darcy de Knayth	George Godolphin Osborne; 1802–1872; 8th Duke of Leeds, etc., 2nd Baron Godolphin (of Farnham Royal)	Sydney Godolphin Osborne; 1808–1889
George Godolphin Osborne; 1828–1895; 9th Duke of Leeds, etc., 3rd Baron Godolphin (of Farnham Royal)	Sidney Francis Godolphin Osborne; 1835–1903
George Frederick Osborne; 1861 styled Earl of Danby	George Godolphin Osborne; 1862–1927; 10th Duke of Leeds, etc., 4th Baron Godolphin (of Farnham Royal)
John Francis Godolphin Osborne; 1901–1963; 11th Duke of Leeds, etc., 6th Baron Godolphin (of Farnham Royal)	Francis D'Arcy Godolphin Osborne; 1884–1964; 12th Duke of Leeds, etc., 5th Baron Godolphin (of Farnham Royal)
Dukedom extinct, 1964

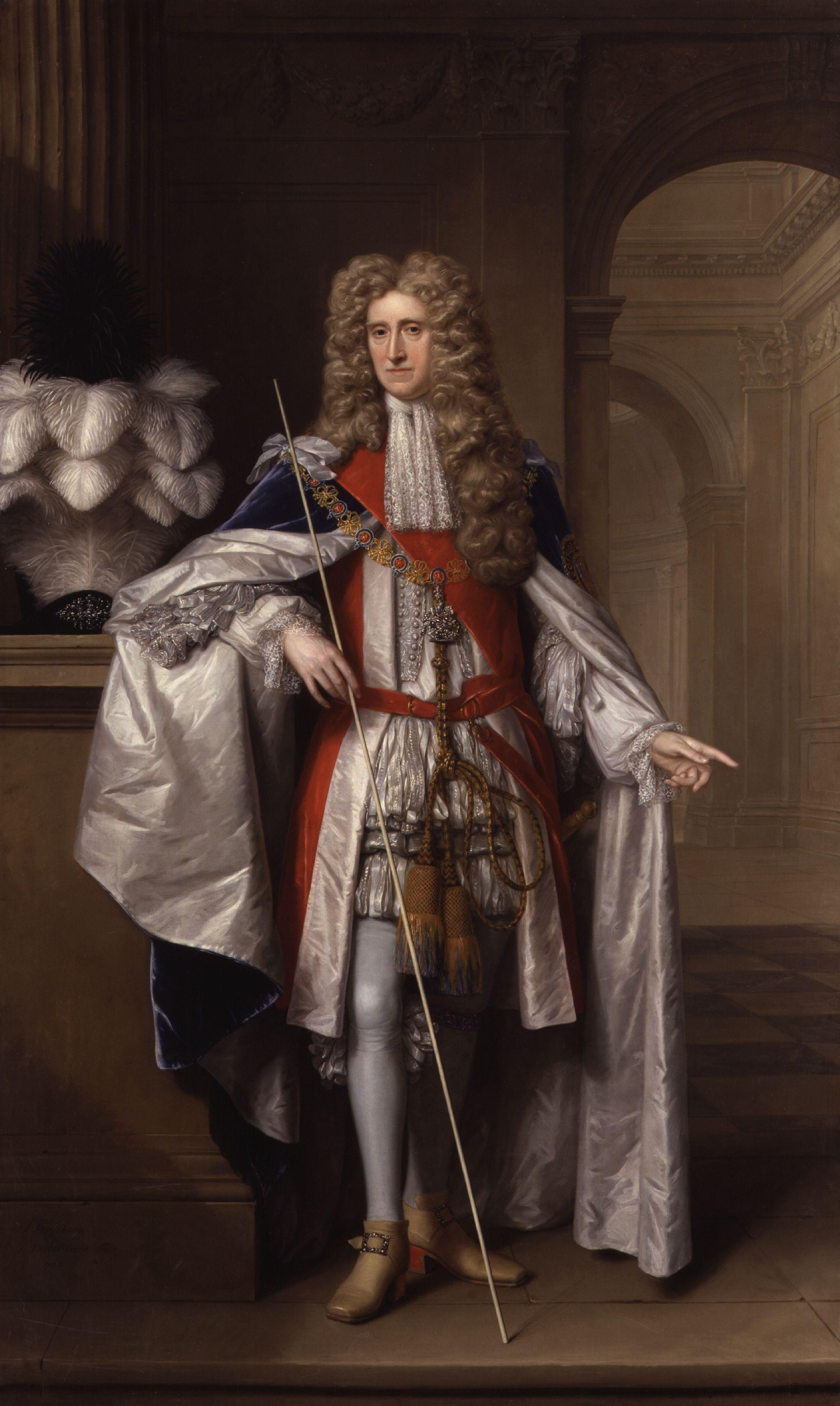
Thomas Osborne, 1st Duke of Leeds

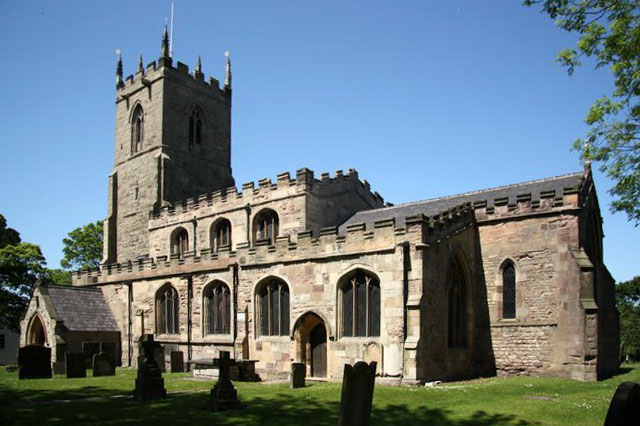
All Hallows Church, Harthill, South Yorkshire

Ancestral arms of the Osborne family: Quarterly ermine and azure, over all a cross or

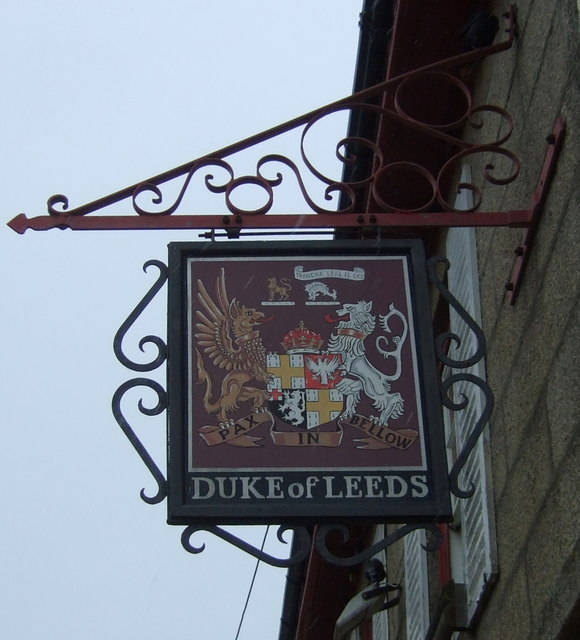
The sign for the Duke of Leeds public house, Leedstown, Cornwall
