= Sydney Godolphin Osborne =

English cleric, philanthropist & writer (1808-1889)

Lord Sydney Godolphin Osborne
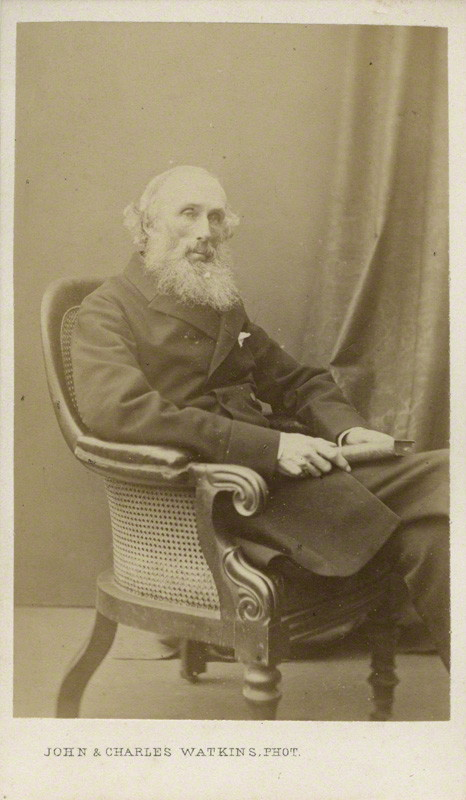
- Sydney Godolphin Osborne
- Born: 5 February 1808; Stapleford, Cambridgeshire, England
- Died: 9 May 1889 (aged 81); Lewes, East Sussex, England
- Education: Rugby School
- Alma mater: Brasenose College, Oxford
- Occupations: Cleric & writer
- Spouse: Emily Grenfell (m. 1834; died 1875)
- Children: 4
- Parents: Francis Osborne (father); Elizabeth Charlotte Eden (mother)
- Relatives: William Eden, 1st Baron Auckland (maternal grandfather); George Godolphin Osborne (brother); Francis Godolphin D'Arcy Osborne (cousin); Pascoe Grenfell (father-in-law); Francis D'Arcy Godolphin Osborne (grandson)

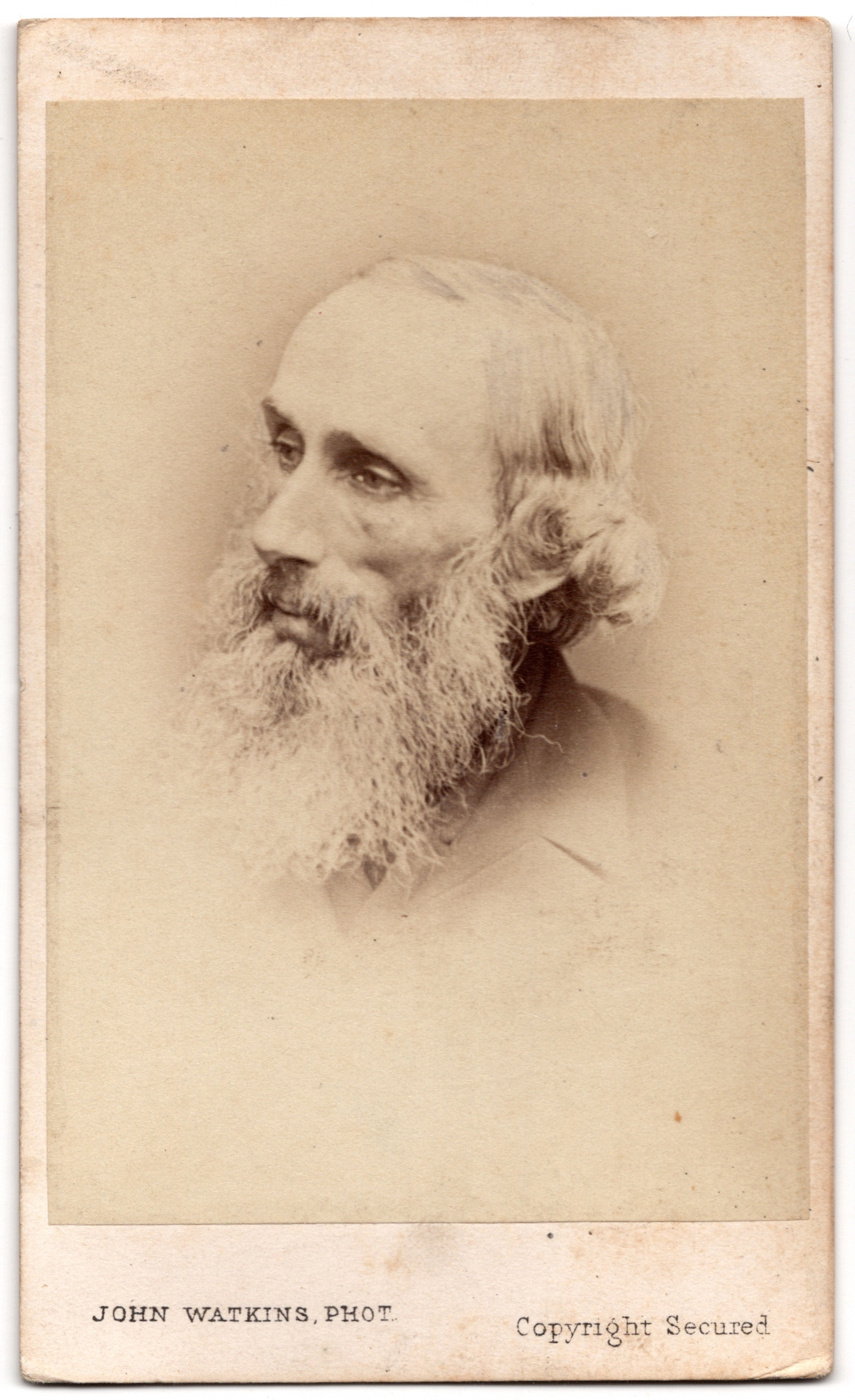

Lord Sidney Godolphin Osborne (5 February 1808 – 9 May 1889) was an English cleric, philanthropist and writer.

== Life ==
The third son of Francis Osborne, 1st Baron Godolphin, by Elizabeth Charlotte Eden, daughter of William Eden, 1st Baron Auckland, he was born at Stapleford, Cambridgeshire on 5 February 1808. He was a direct descendant of Sidney Godolphin, 1st Earl of Godolphin, and when in 1859 his elder brother George Godolphin Osborne, succeeded his cousin Francis Godolphin D'Arcy Osborne, as eighth Duke of Leeds, he obtained the rank of a duke's son, and with it the use of "Lord", a courtesy title.

Osborne was educated at Rugby School and at Brasenose College, Oxford, where he graduated B.A. in 1830. Having taken orders, he was appointed rector of Stoke Poges in Buckinghamshire in 1832. In 1841 he accepted the living of Durweston in Dorset, which was in the gift of Lord Portman, and he occupied it until 1875.

Osborne then resigned his benefice and retired to Lewes, where he died on 9 May 1889.

== Interests ==
Osborne commented on free trade, education, women's rights, sanitation, cattle plague, and cholera. During the Crimean War, he made an unofficial inspection and aided the improvement of the hospitals under Florence Nightingale's care, and published the results in Scutari and its Hospitals, 1855. With respect to Ireland he was a Unionist, and in church matters an anticlerical. Agricultural labourers were a particular interest.

== Works ==
Osborne was mainly known for his letters to The Times newspaper signed "S. G. O." He constantly and quite ferociously provoked controversy. The series started in 1844. The final letters were on the subject of the Whitechapel murders, in 1888. A selection from them was published, with a brief introduction, by Arnold White (2 vols. London, 1888). His other writings included:

- Gleanings in the West of Ireland, 1850. The result of Osborne's second visit to Ireland during Ireland's Great Famine (1845-1852). Osborne's first Famine tour took place in the summer of 1849 and likely continued into November of that year. He wrote a series of letters concerning this first visit that were published in the London Times. There is a strong possibility that he is also the author and illustrator of a famous series on famine Ireland published between Dec. 15 1849 and Feb. 9, 1850 in The Illustrated London News. Osborne returned to famine-stricken Western Ireland in June 1850 for more observations and fact-finding and published his results in more Times letters as well as his 1850 monograph Gleanings.
- Lady Eva: her last Days. A Tale, 1851. Osborne's only known novel, it tells the tale of two young women on their deathbeds—one high-born and sheltered, the other a repentant fallen woman. Both women are visited by the same compassionate Anglican pastor. Osborne dedicated the volume to his wife.
- Scutari and its Hospitals, 1855. Osborne created a series of dazzling sketches to accompany his memoir of his Crimean War visit.
- Hints to the Charitable, 1856.
- Hints for the Amelioration of the Moral Condition of a Village, 1856.
- Letters on the Education of Young Children, 1866.

== Family ==
Osborne married in 1834 Emily, daughter of Pascoe Grenfell of Taplow Court, Buckinghamshire; and was therefore brother-in-law to Charles Kingsley and James Anthony Froude. His wife died on 19 December 1875, leaving two sons and two daughters. His grandson Francis D'Arcy Godolphin Osborne was the 12th—and last—Duke of Leeds.
