= George Osborne, 8th Duke of Leeds =

British peer (1802–1872)

His Grace The Duke of Leeds
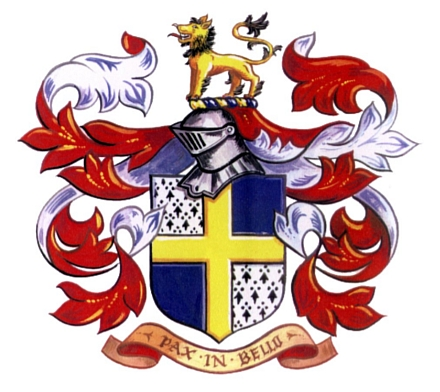
- Ancestral arms of the Osborne family, Dukes of Leeds

Personal details
- Born: George Godolphin Osborne; 16 July 1802 Gog Magog Hills, Cambridgeshire, England
- Died: 8 August 1872 (aged 70) Gog Magog Hills, Cambridgeshire, England
- Resting place: All Hallows Church, Harthill, South Yorkshire
- Spouse: Harriet Arundel Stewart (m. 1824)
- Children: George Osborne, 9th Duke of Leeds; Rev. Lord Francis Osborne; Lady Susan Milbank; Maj. Lord D'Arcy Osborne; Lord William Osborne; Lady Emma Osborne; Lady Charlotte Osborne; Lady Blanche Morris
- Parent(s): Francis Osborne, 1st Baron Godolphin; Hon. Elizabeth Eden

George Godolphin Osborne, 8th Duke of Leeds (16 July 1802 – 8 August 1872) was a British peer. He was known as Baron Godolphin from 1850 until 1859, when he inherited the dukedom.

== Early life and background ==
Lord Leeds was born at Gogmagog Hills, Cambridgeshire, the eldest son of Lord Francis Osborne and his wife, The Hon. Elizabeth Eden. Lord Leeds's father, Lord Francis, was the second son and youngest child of Francis Osborne, 5th Duke of Leeds, and his wife, the former Lady Amelia Darcy. Lord Leeds's mother was the daughter of William Eden, 1st Baron Auckland.

In 1832, his father was created Baron Godolphin, upon which George became known as The Hon. George Osborne. When the 1st Baron Godolphin died in 1850, George succeeded his father and became the 2nd Baron Godolphin of Farnham Royal co. Buckingham.

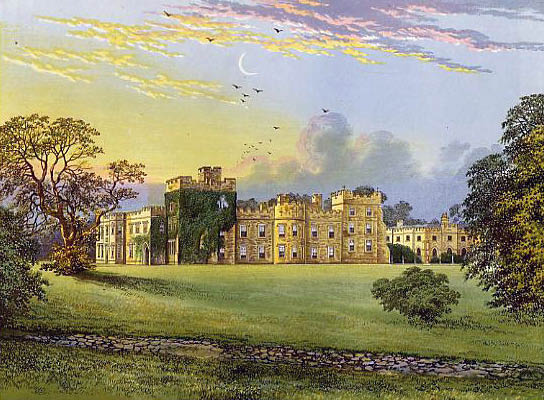
Hornby Castle, seats of the Duke of Leeds

Nine years later, George's first cousin, the 7th Duke of Leeds, died without issue; George therefore inherited the Dukedom of Leeds, thus becoming styled His Grace The Duke of Leeds. With the Dukedom of Leeds, George also inherited the titles Earl of Danby co. York, Viscount Osborne of Dunblane, 4 May 1859, Baron Osborne of Kiveton co. York, Marquess of Carmarthen, Viscount Latimer of Danby co. York, and Baronet Osborne of Kiveton co. York.

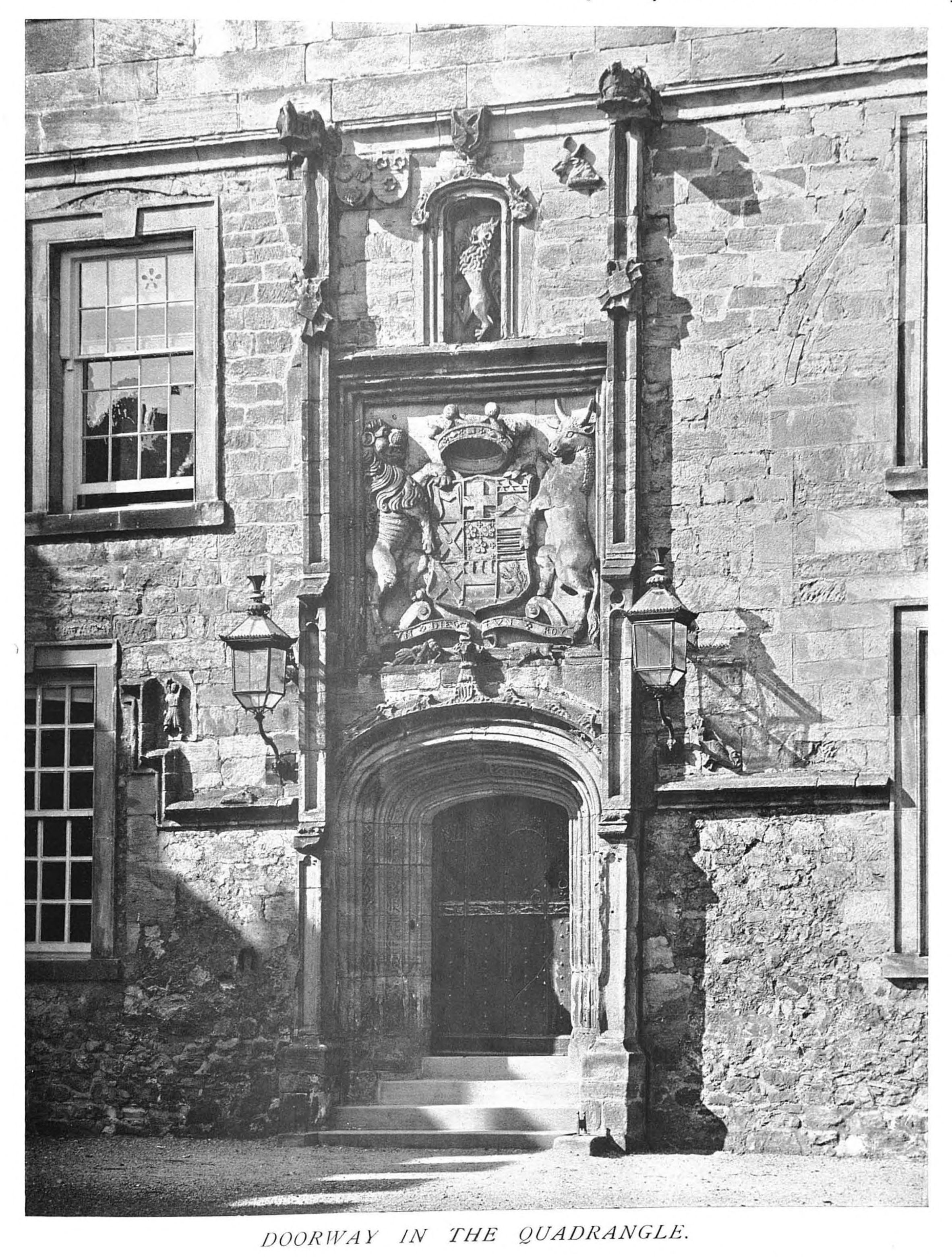
Hornby Castle

Although the dukedom had passed to George, the Baronies of Conyers and Darcy de Knayth and the Portuguese countship of Mértola were passed to his cousin Sackville Lane-Fox. Lane-Fox was the son of the 6th Duke's daughter, Lady Charlotte Mary Anne Georgiana Osborne (c. 1806–1836); and as those peerages allowed for succession in the female line, they passed to Lane-Fox. The Godolphin barony and the dukedom remained united until the death of the last Duke of Leeds in 1964, when both titles became extinct.

== Marriage and issue ==
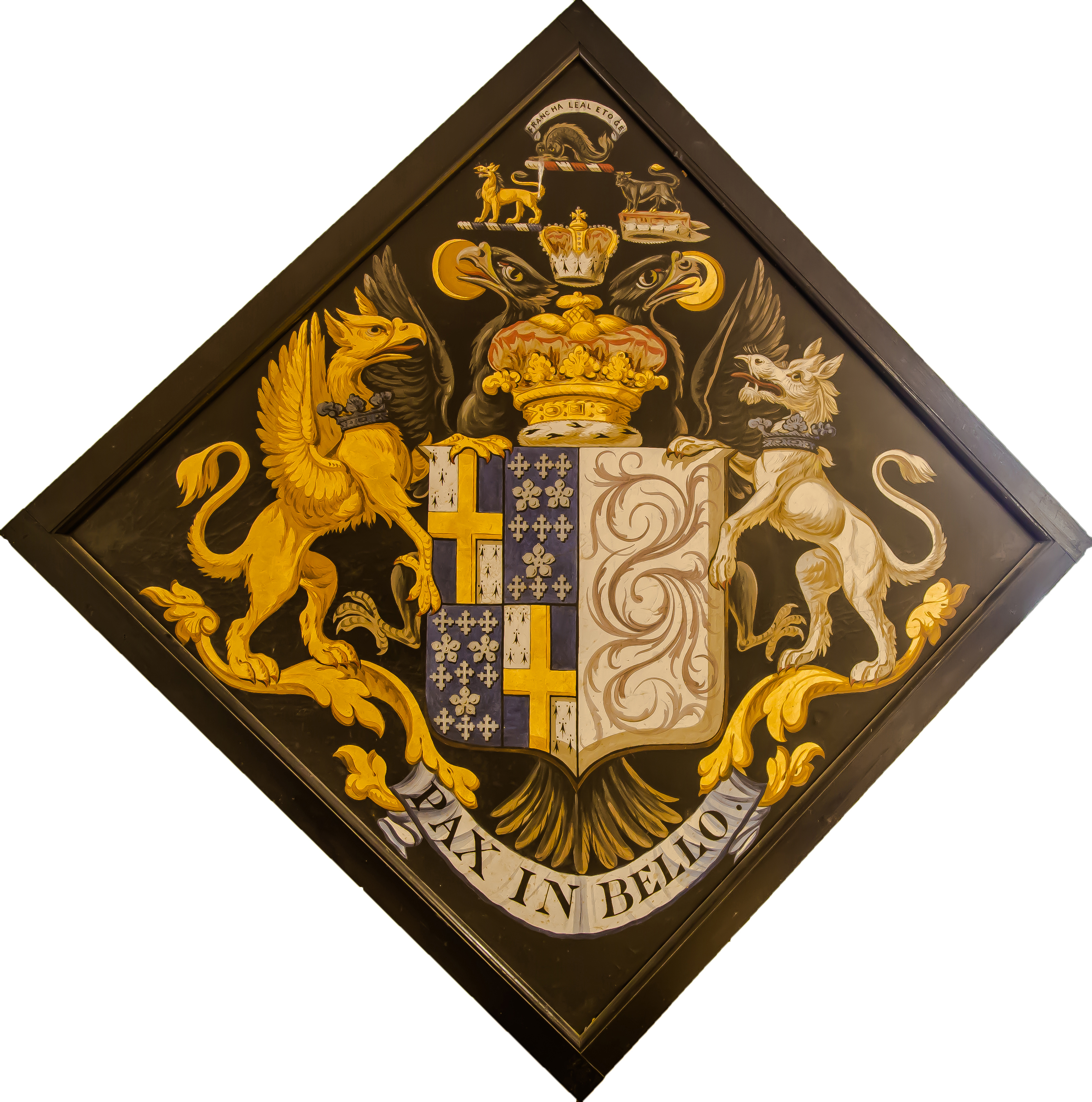
Funeral hatchment in Church of St Giles, Stoke Poges

On 21 October 1824, he married Harriet Emma Arundel Stewart at the British Embassy in Paris. She was an illegitimate daughter of Granville Leveson-Gower, 1st Earl Granville, by Lady Henrietta Frances Spencer, wife of the 3rd Earl of Bessborough. Harriet Stewart was thus a maternal half-sister of Lady Caroline Lamb.

With Harriet Stewart, he had eight children:

- Sir George Godolphin Osborne, 9th Duke of Leeds (11 August 1828 – 23 December 1895), succeeded his father as the 9th Duke in 1872. He married on 16 January 1861 Hon. Frances Georgiana Pitt-Rivers, daughter of George Pitt-Rivers, 4th Baron Rivers of Sudeley Castle and Lady Susan Georgiana Leveson-Gower (herself a daughter of Granville Leveson-Gower, 1st Earl Granville); had issue. He was succeeded in the dukedom by his second surviving son, George Osborne, 10th Duke of Leeds.
- Rev. Lord Francis George Godolphin Osborne (6 April 1830 – 6 March 1907), twin brother; married on 4 July 1854 Matilda Katharine Rich (d. 19 January 1914), and had one daughter.
- Lady Susan Georgina Godolphin Osborne (6 April 1830 – 14 November 1903), twin sister; married on 22 June 1864 Henry John Milbank (1824-1872), son of Mark Milbank and Lady Augusta Henrietta Vane (daughter of William Vane, 1st Duke of Cleveland); had issue
- Major Lord D'Arcy Godolphin Osborne (14 June 1834 – 20 March 1895), married on 6 December 1887 Annie Allhusen, daughter of Christian Allhusen
- Lord William Godolphin Osborne (28 August 1835 – 28 December 1888), married on 8 September 1859 Mary Catherine Headley and had issue.
- Lady Emma Charlotte Godolphin Osborne (20 February 1837 – 24 May 1906), Lady of the Bedchamber to the Duchess of Edinburgh
- Lady Charlotte Godolphin Osborne (21 March 1838 – 25 March 1914)
- Lady Blanche Godolphin Osborne (15 March 1842 – 13 February 1917); married on 16 September 1869 General Charles Henry Morris, son of Sir John Morris, 2nd Bt. and Hon. Lucy Juliana Byng; had two daughters.

== Later life and death ==
The 8th Duke of Leeds died on 8 August 1872 at the age of 70 at Gog Magog Hills, Cambridgeshire, England. He was buried in the Osborne family chapel at All Hallows Church, Harthill, South Yorkshire.

Peerage of England
Preceded by Francis D'Arcy-Osborne	Duke of Leeds; 1859–1872	Succeeded by George Osborne
Peerage of the United Kingdom
Preceded by Francis Osborne	Baron Godolphin; 1850–1872	Succeeded by George Osborne
