= Henrietta Ponsonby, Countess of Bessborough =

British aristocrat (1761–1821)

The Right Honourable The Countess of Bessborough
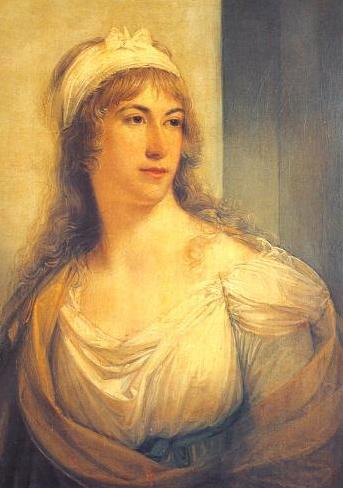
- Portrait by Angelica Kauffman, 1793

Personal details
- Born: Lady Henrietta Frances Spencer; 16 June 1761 Wimbledon, Surrey, England
- Died: 11 November 1821 (aged 60) Florence, Grand Duchy of Tuscany
- Spouse: Frederick Ponsonby, 3rd Earl of Bessborough (m. 1780)
- Children: John Ponsonby, 4th Earl of Bessborough; Sir Frederick Ponsonby; Lady Caroline Lamb; William Ponsonby, 1st Baron de Mauley; Harriet Osborne, Baroness Godolphin; George Stewart
- Parent(s): John Spencer, 1st Earl Spencer; Margaret Georgiana Poyntz

Henrietta Frances Ponsonby, Countess of Bessborough (née Spencer; 16 June 1761 – 11 November 1821), was the wife of Frederick Ponsonby, 3rd Earl of Bessborough; the couple were the parents of Lady Caroline Lamb. Her father, John Spencer, 1st Earl Spencer, was a great-grandson of John Churchill, 1st Duke of Marlborough. Her sister was Georgiana Cavendish, Duchess of Devonshire.

== Biography ==
=== Early life ===
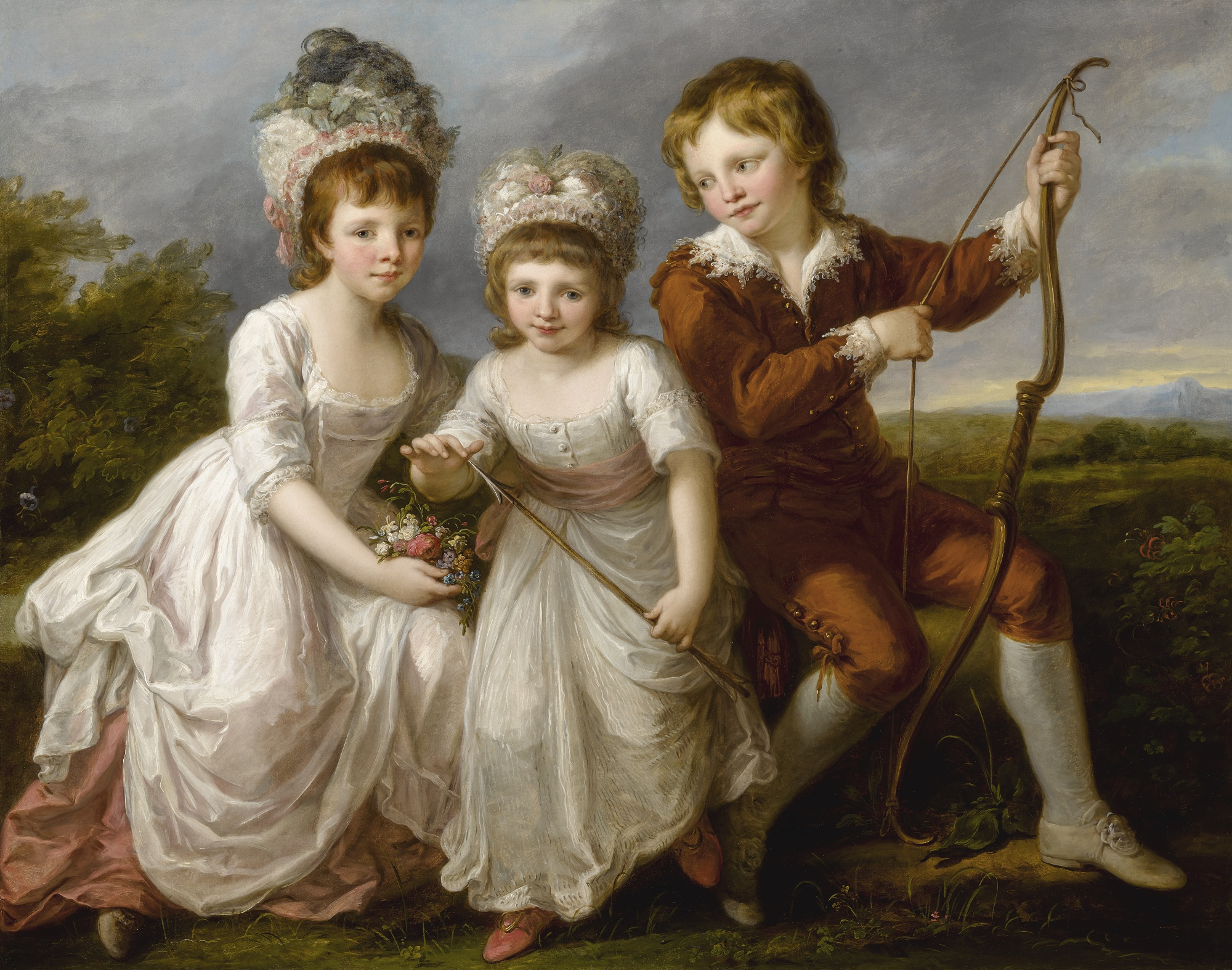
Lady Georgiana Spencer, Henrietta Spencer and George, Viscount Althorp, by Angelica Kauffman, c. 1766

Being the youngest child, Harriet was often left in England, where her parents and elder sister Georgiana would visit the continent for her father's health. As a child, Harriet was frail and sickly, which led her mother, Lady Spencer, Georgiana Spencer, Countess Spencer, to send her abroad for schooling, thinking that foreign air would help strengthen her. However, she grew into a young woman of unique beauty and good nature. She was keenly intelligent with a perceptive eye for the people around her and a well-read wit. Her friends valued her kind, gentle disposition and her quiet self-assurance.

=== Marriage ===
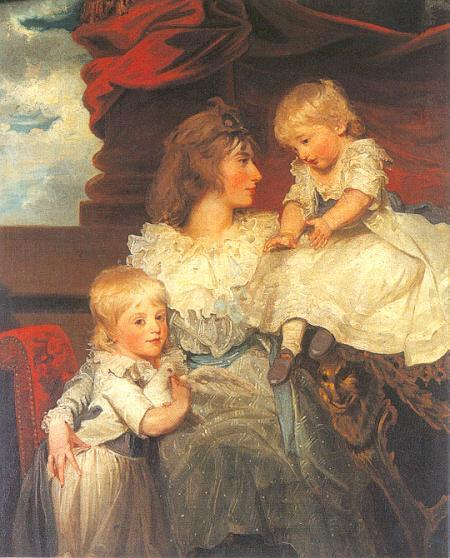
Henrietta Ponsonby with her sons Frederick and John, by John Hoppner (1787)

On 27 November 1780, Harriet married Frederick Ponsonby, 3rd Earl of Bessborough, an Anglo-Irish nobleman who was at the time the Viscount Duncannon and later became the 3rd Earl of Bessborough. Harriet and Duncannon had four children: John William, later 4th Earl of Bessborough; Frederick Ponsonby; Lady Caroline Lamb, and William Ponsonby, who became the 1st Baron de Mauley.

Their marriage was turbulent because Duncannon was abusive. Fluctuating between sweet or obsessive attentiveness, neglecting Harriet entirely, or physically abusing her, Duncannon's treatment of his wife was so well-known that his family could not keep up appearances by pretending it was not occurring. Duncannon's abuse was so widely known that Harriet's serious illness in 1791 made society gossip that he was trying to poison her. Tired of Duncannon's abuse and craving love in her life, Harriet began an affair with Richard Brinsley Sheridan. After Duncannon walked in on Harriet and Sheridan having intercourse, Duncannon immediately requested a divorce from Harriet. This was narrowly avoided only when Duncannon's father William Ponsonby, 2nd Earl of Bessborough and the powerful Cavendish clan sided with Harriet, meaning it would be social suicide to divorce her.

Like most of the ton, Duncannon and Harriet were gambling addicts. The couple compiled ruinous debt over the course of their marriage. When he lost, Duncannon would erupt into rages that terrified his wife. Duncannon's abuse and his gambling rages made Harriet's family fearful for her safety. Their fears were often proven, as when he threatened violence if Harriet did not hand over her marriage settlement to him after losing an especially ruinous gambling round. Luckily for the terrified Harriet, her kind brother George Spencer, 2nd Earl Spencer, swept in and protected her from immediate violence by quietly giving Duncannon the money.

By 1820 Duncannon ceased his abuse, and he and Harriet eventually settled into a companionable marriage.

==== Affairs ====
Harriet had numerous lovers during her marriage; as she once remarked, "I can never love anyone just a little". Among her more notable lovers were Richard Brinsley Sheridan, the playwright and Whig politician, and Granville Leveson-Gower, 1st Earl Granville, who was the love of her life.

Her affair with Granville produced two illegitimate children: Harriet Emma Arundel Stewart, wife of George Osborne, 8th Duke of Leeds (though she died in 1852 before he succeeded to the title), and George Stewart. Harriet managed to hide her pregnancies from her husband; this was less difficult in an era when the aristocracy might make extended visits of many months abroad or to friends' country homes. She later sadly remarked that she had "loved [Granville] to idolatry for seventeen years". However, she came to believe that he loved her least of all the men in her life, "although I once believed otherwise". Recognising his need to marry for purposes of his political career, she did not oppose, and in fact, facilitated Granville's marriage to her niece, Lady Harriet Cavendish ('Harryo') in 1809.

==== Friends and admirers ====
Of her younger admirers, Harriet's favourite was The Honourable William Lamb (who succeeded as the 2nd Viscount Melbourne in 1828. He then fell in love with her daughter, Caroline. Although Harriet was anxious for Caroline to marry early, she had misgivings (which would come to be entirely justified) as to whether William and Caroline were well suited; in addition, she and William's mother Elizabeth Lamb, Viscountess Melbourne, detested each other (Harriet referred to the shrewd and coldly pragmatic Lady Melbourne as "the Thorn"). However, due to her fondness for William, she gave her consent to their marriage.

A loyal friend, Harriet was one of Sheridan's last remaining friends. In 1802, Sheridan's characteristic despicable behaviour took an even more sinister turn, and he began harassing Harriet. By 1805, his harassment of Harriet escalated into sending her threatening anonymous letters; as they had been longtime friends and former lovers, Harriet quickly deduced the author's identity as Sheridan's from his handwriting. Sheridan accosted Harriet in public and made a scene any chance he could, reproaching her for not loving him enough and declaring his undying love for her. Despite his cruelty towards her, Harriet was kind to him on his deathbed in 1816. In return, Sheridan grasped her hand hard and told her he would haunt her after his death. Harriet, petrified, asked why, having persecuted her all his life, he was determined to continue his persecution after death. "Because I am resolved you shall remember me." After enduring a few more minutes of his terror, Harriet fled the room. Three days later, Sheridan died alone.

Harriet had an acute understanding of politics and often accompanied her sister to political events as well as soirees. She was also very close to her sister Georgiana's best friend, Lady Elizabeth Foster, with whom she often was seen in public.

=== Death ===
Harriet died on 11 November 1821, in Florence, Italy, at the age of 60, following the death of her youngest grandchild, Henry, in Parma. According to Lord David Cecil, she died peacefully and without regrets, worn out as she was by a life of emotional turmoil. He describes her as a woman of "indescribable distinction".

== Ancestry ==
Ancestors of Henrietta Ponsonby, Countess of Bessborough

16. Robert Spencer, 2nd Earl of Sunderland
8. Charles Spencer, 3rd Earl of Sunderland
17. Lady Anne Digby
4. The Hon. John Spencer
18. John Churchill, 1st Duke of Marlborough
9. Lady Anne Churchill
19. Sarah Jennings
2. John Spencer, 1st Earl Spencer
20. George Carteret, 1st Baron Carteret
10. John Carteret, 2nd Earl Granville
21. Lady Grace Granville, 1st Countess Granville
5. Lady Georgina Carolina Carteret
22. Sir Robert Worsley, 4th Baronet, of Appuldurcombe
11. Frances Worsley
23. Frances Thynne
1. Henrietta Frances Ponsonby, Countess of Bessborough
24. Newdigate Poyntz
12. William Poyntz
25. Mary Parkyns
6. Stephen Poyntz
26. Stephen Monteage
13. Jane Monteage
27. Jane Deane
3. Margaret Georgiana Poyntz
28. John Mordaunt, 1st Viscount Mordaunt
14. The Hon. Lewis Mordaunt
29. Elizabeth Carey
7. Anna Maria Mordaunt
30. Thomas Collyer
15. Mary Collyer
31. Mary Lunsford
