= Francis Osborne, 1st Baron Godolphin =

British politician (1777-1850)

Francis Godolphin Osborne 1st Baron Godolphin

Member of Parliament for Helston
- In office 1799–1801 Serving with Charles Abbot
- Preceded by: Charles Abbot; Richard Richards
- Succeeded by: Parliament of the United Kingdom

Member of Parliament for Helston
- In office 1801–1802 Serving with Charles Abbot
- Preceded by: Parliament of Great Britain
- Succeeded by: Viscount FitzHarris; John Penn

Member of Parliament for Lewes
- In office 1802–1806 Serving with Henry Shelley
- Preceded by: Thomas Kemp; John Cressett-Pelham
- Succeeded by: Henry Shelley; Thomas Kemp

Member of Parliament for Cambridgeshire
- In office 1810–1831 Serving with Henry Shelley
- Preceded by: Charles Philip Yorke; Lord Charles Manners
- Succeeded by: Henry John Adeane; Richard Greaves Townley

Personal details
- Born: 18 October 1777
- Died: 15 February 1850 (aged 72)
- Party: Whig
- Spouse: Hon. Elizabeth Charlotte Eden (m. 1800; died 1847)
- Children: 5, including The Hon. George Godolphin Osborne and The Hon. Rev. Sydney Godolphin Osborne
- Parents: Francis Osborne (father); Amelia d'Arcy (mother)
- Relatives: Robert Darcy, 4th Earl of Holderness (maternal grandfather); 2nd Earl of Godolphin (great grandfather); 4th Duke of Leeds (paternal grandfather); George Osborne (brother); Mary Osborne (sister); Francis Godolphin (cousin)
- Education: Trinity College, Cambridge

Francis Godolphin Osborne, 1st Baron Godolphin (18 October 1777 – 15 February 1850), styled Lord Francis Osborne from 1789–1832, was a British aristocrat and Whig politician.

== Early life ==
Osborne was born in 1777, the third and youngest child of Francis Osborne, 5th Duke of Leeds and his first wife, Amelia d'Arcy, Baroness Conyers, daughter of Robert Darcy, 4th Earl of Holderness. His parents were both peers in their own right. His grandmother was Lady Mary Godolphin, daughter of the 2nd Earl of Godolphin, who had married his grandfather the 4th Duke of Leeds. His elder siblings were George Osborne, 6th Duke of Leeds and Mary Pelham, Countess of Chichester.

Shortly after his first birthday, his mother ran off with her lover Captain John "Mad Jack" Byron. His father was granted a divorce in 1779. His mother quickly married Byron and had three children with him before she died in 1784. Mad Jack remarried and by his second wife was the father of the poet Lord Byron.

He was educated at Trinity College, Cambridge. He succeeded his cousin Francis Godolphin, 2nd Baron Godolphin in his estates at Farnham Royal, Stoke Poges, and Upton cum Chalvey, Buckinghamshire; and Gog Magog, near Stapleford, Cambridgeshire.

== Career ==
Osborne sat as Member of Parliament for Helston between 1799 and 1802, for Lewes between 1802 and 1806, and for Cambridgeshire between 1810 and 1831.

On 14 May 1832, he was raised to the peerage as Baron Godolphin, of Farnham Royal, County of Buckingham.

He was commissioned as a Captain in the Cambridgeshire Militia on 15 January 1831.

From 1836 until his death, he was High Steward of Cambridge.

== Marriage and issue ==
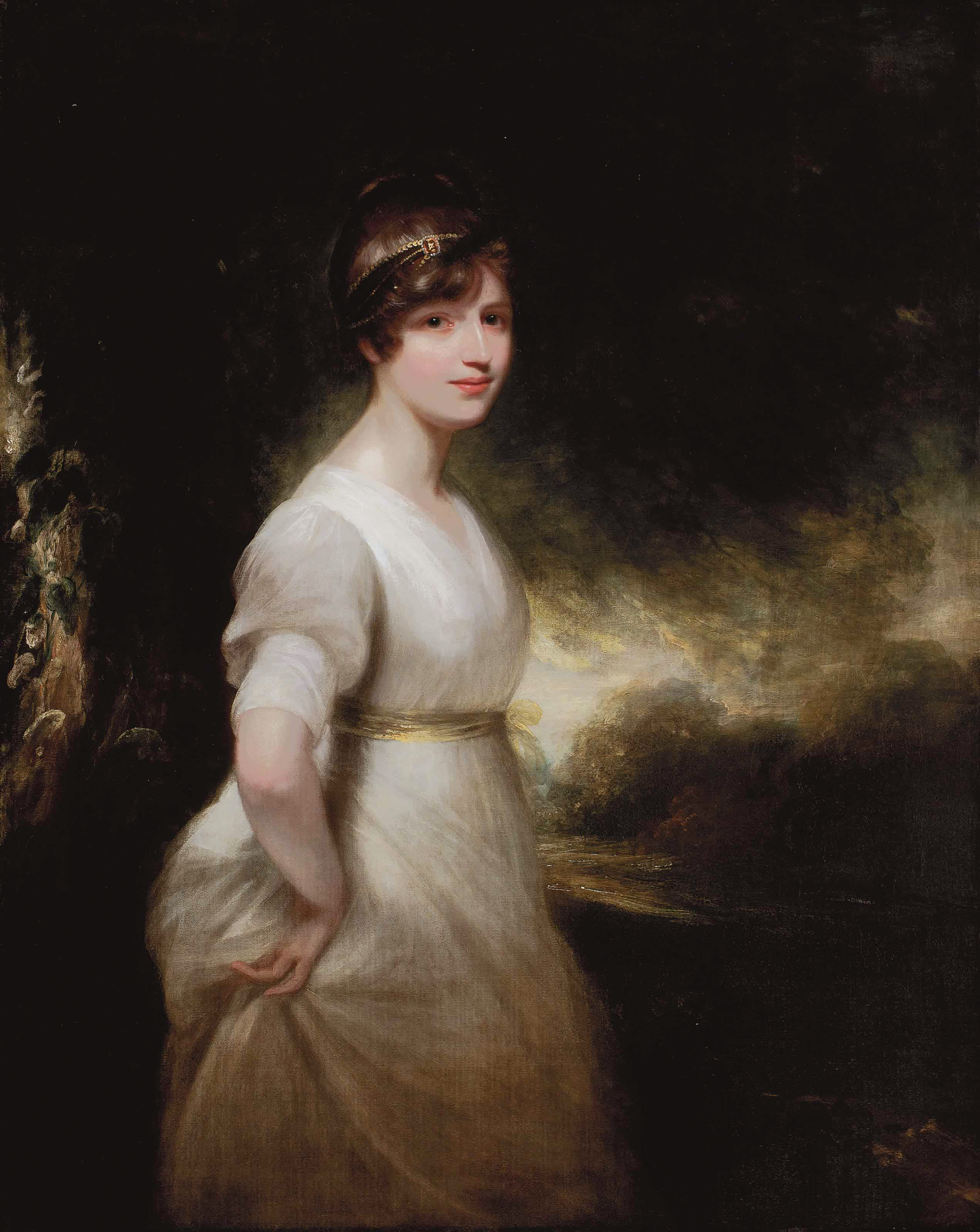
Elizabeth Charlotte Eden, Lady Godolphin (1780–1847) (William Beechey)

Lord Godolphin married the Hon. Elizabeth Charlotte Eden (21 March 1780 – 17 April 1847), third daughter of William Eden, 1st Baron Auckland, on 31 March 1800. They had five surviving children:

- Francis Godolphin (26 May 1801 – 2 February 1802), died in infancy
- The Hon. George Godolphin Osborne (1802–1872), succeeded as 2nd Baron Godolphin in 1850 and as 8th Duke of Leeds in 1859
- The Hon. William Godolphin Osborne (29 March 1804 – 28 December 1888). William traveled in 1836 to India with his cousins George Eden, 1st Earl of Auckland, later Governor General of India; Emily Eden, the travel writer; and Fanny Eden. While there, William wrote and illustrated his 1840 travel narrative The Camp and Court of Runjeet Sing: With an Introductory Sketch of the Origin and Rise of the Sikh State. Married firstly in 1843 Hon. Caroline Montague, daughter of Matthew Montagu, 4th Baron Rokeby. Married secondly in 1870 Hon. Georgiana Henrietta Villiers-Elphinstone, daughter of Admiral George Elphinstone, 1st Viscount Keith.
- The Hon. Rev. Sydney Godolphin Osborne (1808–1889), married in 1834 Emily the sister of Pascoe Grenfell. grandfather of the 12th (and last) Duke of Leeds.
- The Hon. D'Arcy Godolphin Osborne (20 October 1814 – 12 May 1846), married in 1845 Anne Catherine, daughter of Rev. William Douglas
- The Hon. Charlotte Godolphin Osborne (4 August 1805 – 4 December 1838); married in 1829 Sir Theodore Brinckman, 1st Baronet. They were the parents of Sir Theodore Brinckman, 2nd Baronet.

After a period of declining health, Lord Godolphin's died in 1850 at his home at Gog Magog House, Cambridgeshire. His title of Baron Godolphin passed to his eldest son, George, who became the 2nd Baron Godolphin. George later inherited the Dukedom of Leeds from his cousin 7th Duke in 1859. The 8th Duke's surviving siblings, William and Sydney, were granted the rank of a younger son of a duke, becoming Lord William Osborne and Lord Sydney Osborne, respectively, in honour of their father, who would have inherited the dukedom had he not died in 1850.

Parliament of Great Britain
Preceded by Charles Abbot; Richard Richards	Member of Parliament for Helston; 1799–1801; With: Charles Abbot	Succeeded by Parliament of the United Kingdom
Parliament of the United Kingdom
Preceded by Parliament of Great Britain	Member of Parliament for Helston; 1801–1802; With: Charles Abbot	Succeeded by Viscount FitzHarris; John Penn
Preceded by Thomas Kemp; John Cressett-Pelham	Member of Parliament for Lewes; 1802–1806; With: Henry Shelley	Succeeded by Henry Shelley; Thomas Kemp
Preceded by Charles Philip Yorke; Lord Charles Manners	Member of Parliament for Cambridgeshire; 1810–1831; With: Lord Charles Manners 1802–1830; Henry John Adeane 1830–1831	Succeeded by Henry John Adeane; Richard Greaves Townley
Peerage of the United Kingdom
New creation	Baron Godolphin; 1832–1850	Succeeded by George Osborne
