= Harriet Leveson-Gower, Countess Granville =

British socialite and writer (1785–1862)

The Right Honourable The Countess Granville
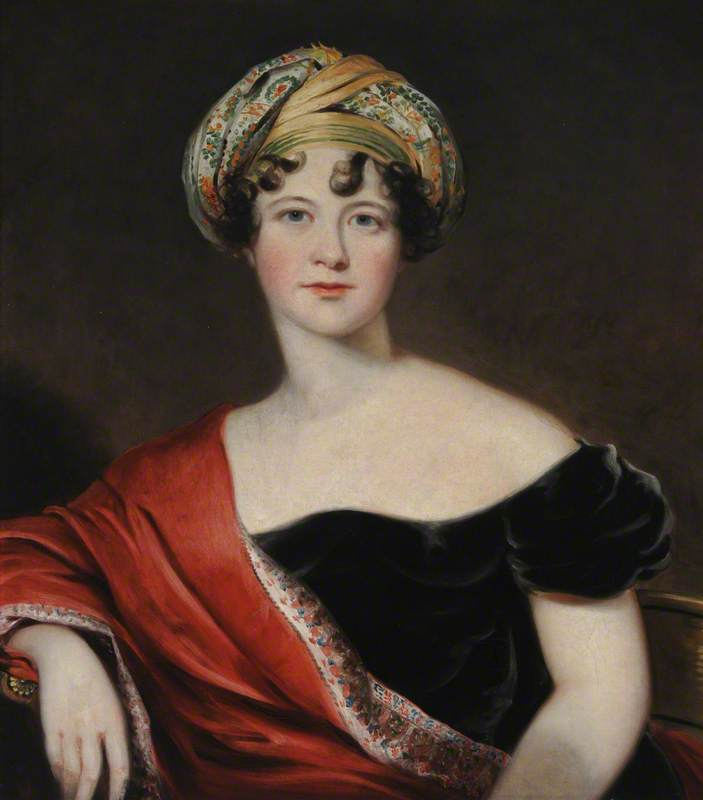
- Portrait c. 1809
- Born: Lady Henrietta Elizabeth Cavendish; 29 August 1785; Devonshire House, Piccadilly, London, England
- Died: 25 November 1862 (aged 77); 13 Hereford Street, Park Lane, London, England
- Noble family: Cavendish; Spencer
- Spouse: Granville Leveson-Gower, 1st Earl Granville (m. 1809; died 1846)
- Issue: Susan Pitt-Rivers, Baroness Rivers; Lady Georgiana Fullerton; Granville Leveson-Gower, 2nd Earl Granville; Hon. Granville William Leveson-Gower; Hon. Frederick Leveson-Gower
- Father: William Cavendish, 5th Duke of Devonshire
- Mother: Lady Georgiana Spencer

Harriet Leveson-Gower, Countess Granville (/ˈluːsənˈɡɔːr/ LOOS-ən-GOR; née Lady Henrietta Elizabeth Cavendish; 29 August 1785 – 25 November 1862) was a British society hostess and writer. The younger daughter of Lady Georgiana Spencer and William Cavendish, 5th Duke of Devonshire, she was a member of the wealthy Cavendish and Spencer families and spent her childhood with her two siblings under the care of a governess.

In 1809 Harriet married Granville Leveson-Gower, a diplomat who had been her maternal aunt's lover for seventeen years. The couple's marriage was long lasting and they had five children. During intermittent periods between 1824 and 1841, Granville served as the British ambassador to France, requiring Harriet to perform a relentless array of social duties in Paris that she often found exhausting and frivolous.

Harriet was a prolific writer of letters, which often humorously described the people around her. Her detailed accounts are regarded as valuable sources of information on life as an ambassadress and on the 19th-century aristocracy. Between 1894 and 1990, four edited collections of Harriet's correspondence were published.

== Early life and family ==
Lady Henrietta Elizabeth Cavendish was born on 29 August 1785 at Devonshire House, Piccadilly, London. Her parents were William Cavendish, 5th Duke of Devonshire, and his first wife, Lady Georgiana Spencer. As major landowners, the Spencer family controlled one of the largest fortunes in England. The Duke of Devonshire possessed even more wealth, with an annual income that was twice as much as that of Georgiana's father; in addition to Devonshire House, he owned Chatsworth House and four other estates of similar opulence. Known as "Harriet" or "Harryo" to her family, the new baby was named after the Duchess's sister Henrietta, Countess of Bessborough and her friend Lady Elizabeth Foster.

The Devonshire marriage was contentious. They had little in common and the Duchess had difficulty bringing her pregnancies to term – their initial nine years together were childless. Seeking distraction from an unhappy match, she spent her time socialising and gambling. She became a prominent supporter and hostess of the Whig Party, as well as a leader of fashion. By the mid-1780s, Devonshire House had become the centre of fashionable life in the Georgian era. Elizabeth Foster, who began living with the Cavendishes in 1782, encouraged the Duchess to pursue a healthier lifestyle, which likely contributed to the successful births of Harriet and her elder sister, Georgiana. The birth of the long-desired heir, Harriet's brother William, arrived in 1790 after sixteen years of marriage.

As Harriet was neither the eldest nor the desired male heir, she was probably the least favorite of her parents' three children. She had a somewhat uneasy relationship with her father throughout his life. In her early years she was devoted to her loving mother, though this relationship suffered a temporary setback in the 1790s. The Duchess, pregnant by the future prime minister Charles Grey, was forced to move abroad and give birth in secret. A two-year separation ensued before she saw her children again, and upon her return she observed that eight-year-old Harriet had become reserved and irritable. One biographer posits that this reticence carried into adulthood during "situations of great difficulty and tragedy", when Harriet would hide her emotions even from those to whom she was usually close.

== Upbringing and first London season ==
The Duke had two illegitimate children with Elizabeth Foster; they were raised alongside the legitimate Cavendishes. Harriet and her siblings, who did not understand why Elizabeth resided with them, disliked her; they also held antipathy for her two teenage sons from a previous marriage, who joined the household in 1796. The Dowager Countess Spencer felt the Devonshire household was amoral and took a prominent role in her grandchildren's upbringing. When Harriet was three, Lady Spencer hired Miss Selina Trimmer as their new governess. (Note: Selina's mother was the educationalist Sarah Trimmer, a writer of children's stories that employed moral themes.) Selina agreed with Lady Spencer that in order to protect the children, the Devonshire household required moral guidance. Deeply religious, Selina encouraged her charges to be morally principled and pious, and strove to provide a stable upbringing with a good education. Though she was often severe, the Cavendish children came to view their governess with affection. Selina became another mother figure in Harriet's life, and had a lasting impact on her piety, which especially thrived in later life.

Harriet began writing letters from a young age; early topics included the activities of family members, and thoughts on the books she was reading. As she grew older it became readily apparent to all, including herself, that she lacked her mother's beauty and slim figure. But she was intelligent and witty in conversation, and lacked her sister's shyness. While Georgiana's first London season quickly drew two eligible admirers and ended in marriage to one of them in 1801, Harriet's first season two years later produced no such offers. As she remained single over the next several years, her family increasingly expected that she would marry her cousin John, Viscount Duncannon. Harriet herself had held this expectation since a young age, though she was unsure whether she cared for him enough to marry. But after three years of indecisiveness, Duncannon married another woman. Her family also unsuccessfully encouraged a match with another cousin, John, Viscount Althorp.

The Duchess's sudden death in 1806 contributed to profound changes in her younger daughter's life. Elizabeth Foster, the Duke's longtime mistress, took control of the Devonshire household and thus usurped this role from his unmarried daughter. Harriet, who had long disliked Elizabeth, avoided her as much as possible. While social norms dictated Harriet could not permanently move out, she was able to frequently stay with other family members, including with her sister at Castle Howard in North Yorkshire. Harriet's son Frederick later wrote that the experience "strengthened the tie of sisterly affection, which bound them together during the whole of their joint lives". From 1801 onwards, Harriet wrote to her sister almost daily until the latter's death in 1858, corresponding in English and French.

== Marriage ==
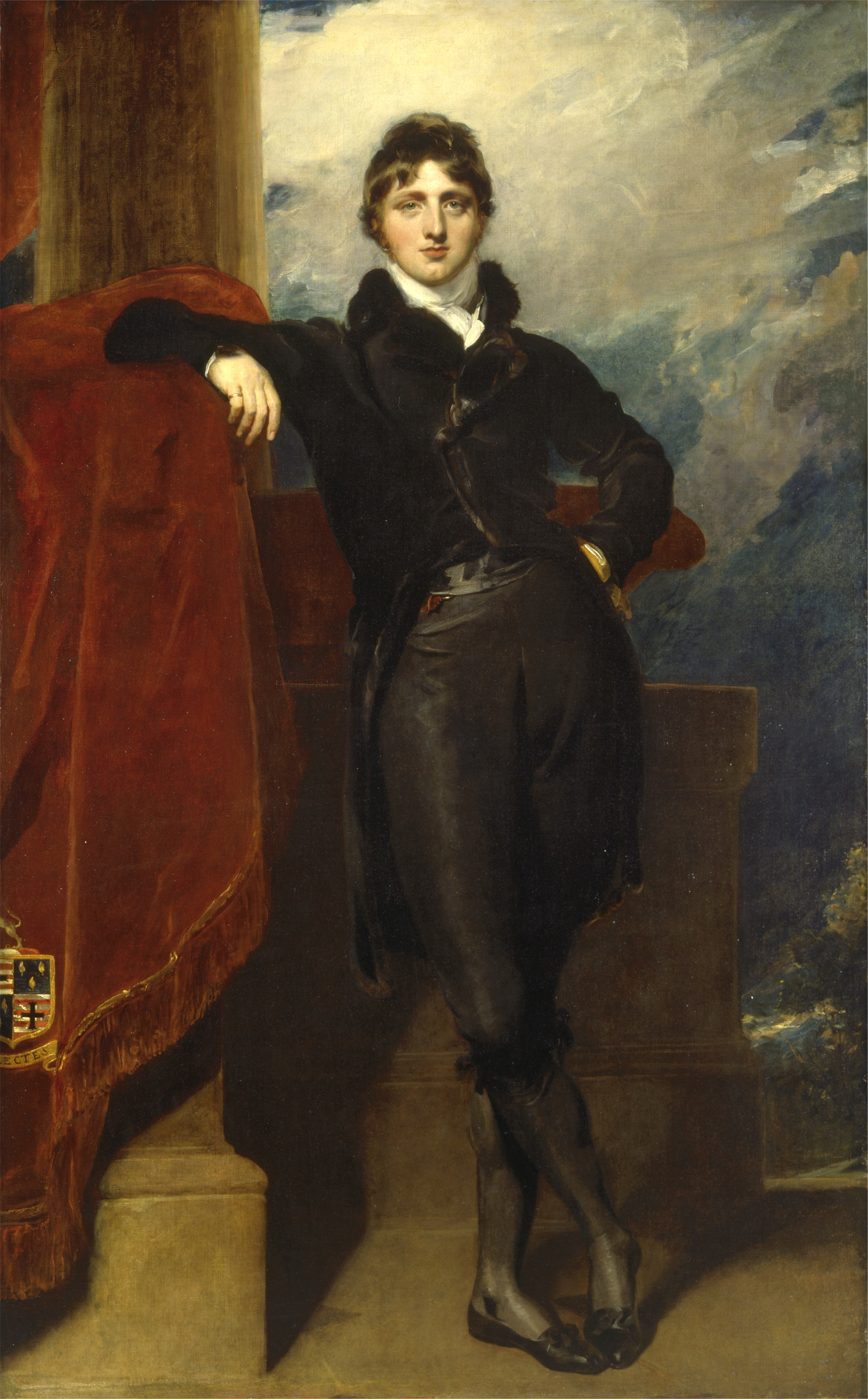
A portrait of Granville Leveson-Gower shortly before his marriage, by the artist Thomas Lawrence

The Duchess's sister, Henrietta, Countess of Bessborough, felt obliged to help her niece escape a difficult home situation. Harriet had previously been critical of her aunt, but with her mother gone, now turned to her for affection and support. When the Duke announced his desire to marry his mistress, Henrietta began searching for a suitable marriage prospect for her niece. The chosen candidate was Lord Granville Leveson-Gower, a politician and diplomat who had been her lover for seventeen years and the father of her two illegitimate children. Though still infatuated with him, she knew that Granville would need to eventually marry and produce legitimate offspring, and that when he did so, she would likely lose him. Convincing her niece to marry him was one way of keeping him within her social circle.

Though Granville had represented several constituencies in the House of Commons and served briefly in the cabinet of the Second Portland ministry, his career was primarily in diplomacy. He had been stationed in various European courts since 1796, and by 1809 had become a mid-career diplomat. Known to Harriet since her childhood, he was twelve years her senior. She had never particularly cared for him, having disapproved of his hauteur and illicit liaison with her aunt. But Harriet's opinion of him now improved. Though he had little wealth of his own, he was a leading member of society as part of the prominent Leveson-Gower family; his half-brother was the very rich Marquess of Stafford (later Duke of Sutherland). Moreover, as the historian K. D. Reynolds writes, Granville was "considered one of the most handsome men of his time; his curly brown hair, blue eyes, and sensuous features brought him strings of female admirers".

Though eager to leave Devonshire House, Harriet insisted that Granville's affair with her aunt be truly over. The prospective groom was unsure if he wanted the unglamorous Harriet as a marriage partner, however, and spent some time pursuing other candidates; their refusals, often due to his womanising reputation, led Granville to ultimately choose Harriet. They became engaged on 13 November 1809. The Duke provided his younger daughter with a dowry of £10,000 (equivalent to £700,000 in 2025), a relatively low sum compared to the nearly £30,000 (equivalent to £2,100,000 in 2025) given to his illegitimate daughter Caroline St. Jules that same year. On 24 December 1809, Harriet married Granville in the drawing room of Chiswick House, an elegant London villa owned by her father.

== Social hostess ==
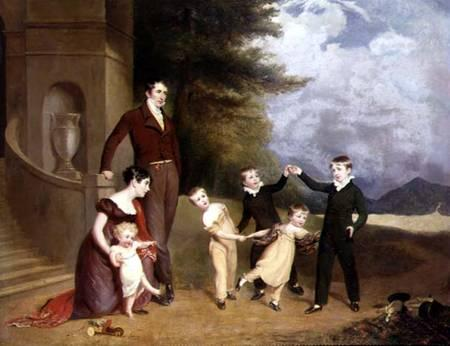
Granville Leveson-Gower, 1st Earl Granville with his wife Harriet and their children

Despite the unusual circumstances surrounding the marriage, Harriet and Granville's letters reveal both were very happy. After a long and difficult labour, their eldest child Susan was born healthy. They would have five children in total – Susan (1810–1866), later the wife of the 4th Baron Rivers; Lady Georgiana Fullerton (1812–1885), a novelist; Granville, 2nd Earl Granville (1815–1891), the future foreign secretary; William (1816–1833), who died young; and Frederick (1819–1907), a Liberal politician. They also adopted Harriet and George Stewart, Granville's two illegitimate children with Henrietta; the pair flourished in the happy household. The elder Harriet found her twelve-year-old step-daughter and cousin to be a "most amiable little creature", and the two would grow especially close in the years that followed.

During their first few years together, the Leveson-Gowers split their time between London and the various country houses of friends and family. As neither brought significant wealth or an estate into the marriage, the smaller size of Harriet's dowry must have caused some disappointment; upon her father's death in 1811, her brother – now 6th Duke of Devonshire – quickly increased her settlement to £30,000. With this new income they were able to rent Tixall Hall in Staffordshire, taking up residence for eight years to raise their growing family and host visitors. In 1819, seeking to be closer to the government in London, they rented Wherstead Park in Suffolk, living there until 1824. For his service, Granville was raised to the peerage and given a viscountcy in 1815. An earldom followed in 1833, whereupon he and his wife became known as Earl and Countess Granville.

The Leveson-Gowers regularly attended large gatherings and parties at country houses. Harriet was a welcome guest when visiting others. As Granville was gregarious and social, she strove to be a great hostess and subsequently became popular. Clever and good-natured, her letters reveal her amusement at those around her, particularly during the visits of dissimilar guests to Wherstead, where they hosted frequently. After one visit to Tixall Hall, Charles Greville – her normally hypercritical cousin – wrote that he could not "remember so agreeable a party", and described Harriet as possessing "a great deal of genius, humour, strong feelings, enthusiasm, delicacy, refinement, good taste, naïveté which just misses being affectation, and a bonhomie which extends to all around her".

== Ambassadress ==
In February 1824 Granville moved to The Hague to begin his service as British ambassador to the Netherlands. Harriet, by now a thirty-nine-year-old mother of five, accompanied him along with their two daughters (their two youngest sons followed in April). Though she had not wished to leave her comfortable life in England, where she had been surrounded by friends and family, she did so to support her husband. After completing the first few days of official duties, Harriet devoted much of her time to domestic routine and being with her children. They only had a short period of time to get settled. In November, the Leveson-Gowers were again required to move upon Granville's appointment as ambassador to France. While Harriet had begun to acclimatise herself well to life in the Netherlands, where her social duties were more relaxed, she was less enthusiastic about the move to Paris. She dreaded the long hours and the superficiality of social life in France.

=== Life in France ===
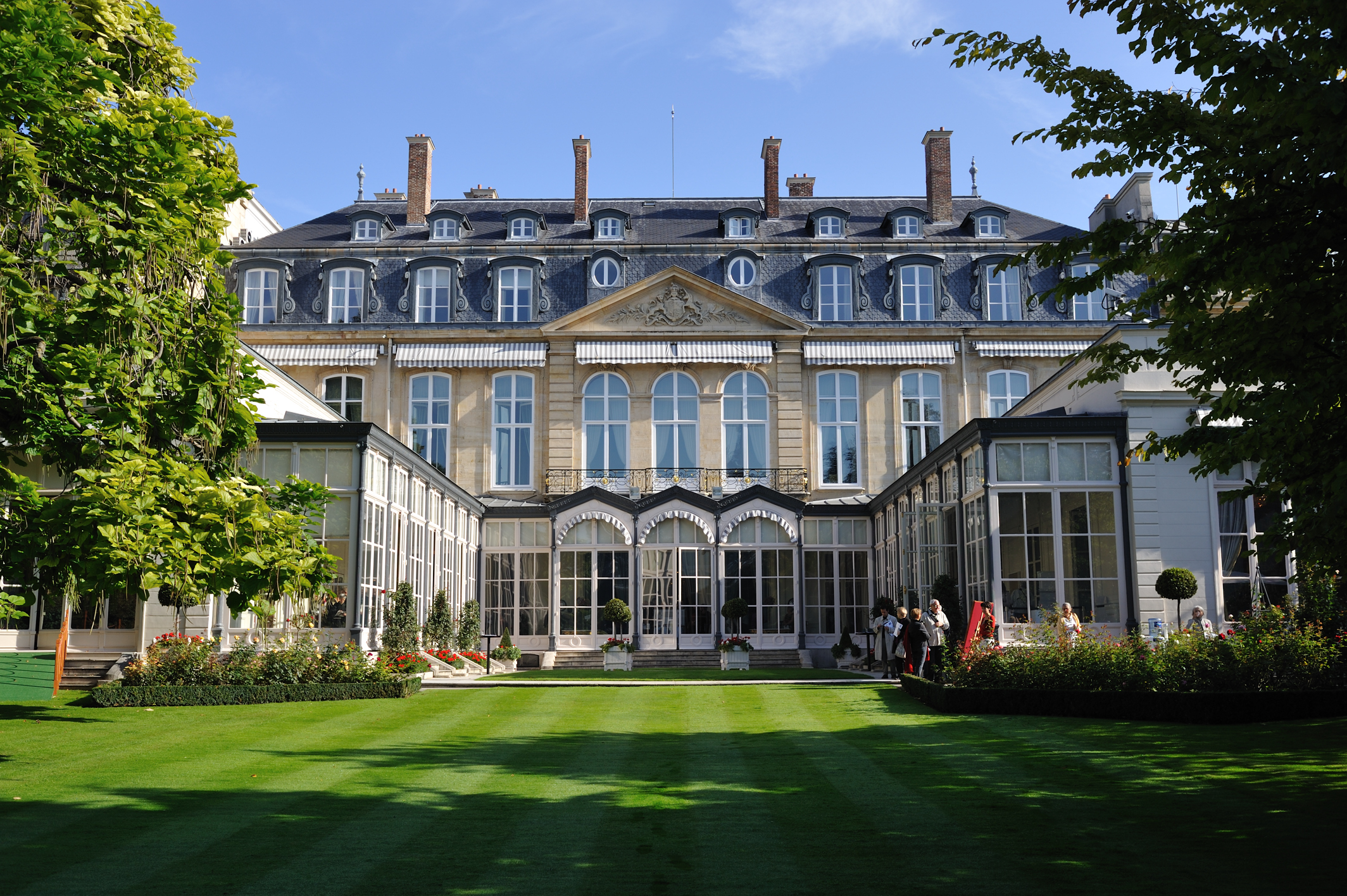
The Hôtel de Charost, where the Leveson-Gowers lived intermittently between 1824 and 1841. Harriet particularly loved its garden.

The Leveson-Gowers moved into the Hôtel de Charost, a stately Parisian townhouse purchased for the British government ten years earlier to serve as its embassy. During the first year, their ability to entertain was limited due to the residence's disrepair. But after overseeing restoration work, the couple hosted large dinner parties, balls, and receptions on a regular basis. As the wife of the British ambassador, Harriet was a prominent figure in Paris and her gatherings became popular events. Her duties required her to visit the royal court, attend and host parties, receive visitors and reciprocate their visits, and patronise local organisations. Harriet did not enjoy the relentlessness of her strictly regulated social duties, finding them exhausting and often frivolous. But she recognised that an embassy's effectiveness often depended on social capital.

At first Harriet viewed many of the French elite with dislike, believing they were superficial and vacuous. They possessed "not as much mind as would fill a pea-shell", she wrote in one letter. "It is odd that their effect on me is to crush me with the sense of my inferiority whilst I am absolutely gasping with the sense of my superiority", she wrote in another. But she was determined to earn their approval, especially as the British government's foreign policy was producing some resentment among the French. During a visit in March 1825, the Duke of Devonshire provided his sister with advice on French culture as well as her deportment and appearance. She invested in the latest fashions and became effective at managing the French elite, having come to the conclusion that they were like "children" whose "object is to be amused and received". After six months in Paris the new ambassadress had reached a point of amused acceptance with her social surroundings. She was successful in her efforts and soon became very popular.

Despite being inundated with politics from a young age due to her mother's prominence as a Whig supporter, Harriet cared little for the subject until later in life. Granville's family were firm Tories, though he was more flexible in his positions. As an ambassadress, Harriet viewed her role more as a facilitator of political activity rather than an active participant. When the Leveson-Gowers hosted parties, she paid careful attention to the needs of those in attendance; luxurious comfort was crucial, as was space for private conversation where important diplomatic and political matters could be discussed. In later years her enthusiasm for politics grew, and she became an ardent supporter of Lord Palmerston, the foreign secretary.

The Leveson-Gowers spent approximately seventeen years in Paris, serving from 1824 to 1828, 1830–1834, and 1835–1841. Each gap was due to a change of government leadership, when a transition of political party prompted Granville to resign his post in 1828 and then in 1834. They typically returned to England during each interval. In 1833 their second son William, who may have had a chronic condition, died at the age of seventeen; he is rarely mentioned in his mother's letters. In 1841 Granville had a severe stroke which caused partial paralysis, and he resigned his ambassadorial post a few months later. For the next two years the family travelled across Europe, before returning to England in November 1843. They resided in houses in Brighton and London, and spent portions of their time visiting friends and family at their various country estates. Granville had another stroke in October 1845 and died in January of the following year.

== Death and legacy ==
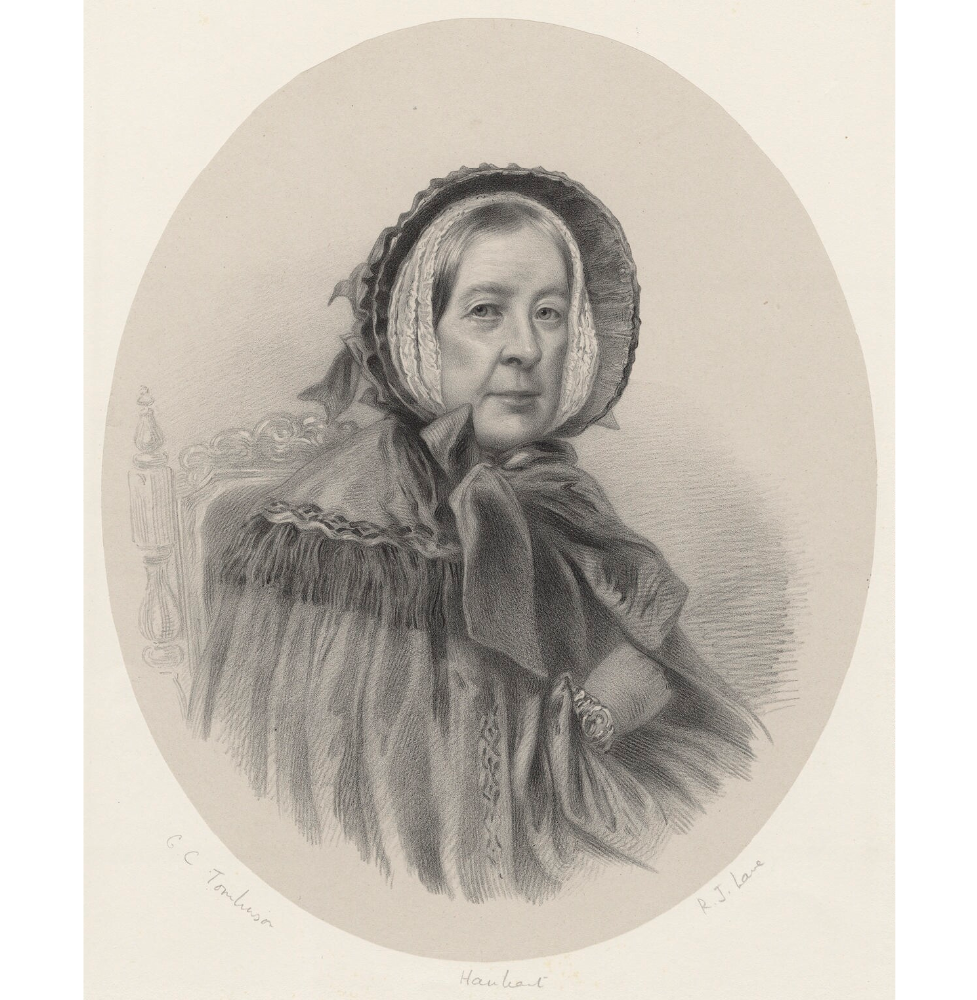
A lithograph of Lady Granville in later life, by Richard James Lane

Granville's death had an overwhelming effect on his wife's final years; historians have described her behaviour as that of a typical Victorian era widow, as Harriet descended into a period of acute grief. In sharp contrast with her previous social activities, she lived in complete retirement. She found comfort in fervent piety and philanthropic works, including charitable donations. After her brother's death in 1858, she inherited Chiswick House and took up residence. Her social circle was limited to immediate family members, and her household came to include her newly widowed son Frederick and his son George. She survived her husband by fifteen years, dying on 25 November 1862 of a stroke at her London home at 13 Hereford Street.

Lady Granville's life has largely been overlooked by historians, who have chosen to focus on her exceptional mother as well as her sister Georgiana. However, her lifetime of correspondence has proven to be a valuable source of information on both Harriet and the period in which she lived. According to the writer Charlotte Furness, Harriet's many letters "give us a remarkable insight into life in the nineteenth-century aristocracy, and life as the wife of a travelling diplomat". The historian Virginia Surtees adds that Harriet's letters "provide an entertaining peepshow into the manners, habits and morals of that much inter-married section of aristocratic nineteenth-century society which also embraced the dandies, wits, and beaux".

Since Harriet's death, four books containing her edited letters have been printed. (Note: Askwith listed three at the time of her book's publication (1982); a fourth was published in 1990.) In 1894, her son Frederick published a two-volume edition of letters written during his parents' marriage, condensing and cutting some of her correspondence in order to produce a shorter work. Harriet's granddaughter Susan Oldfield published another series of letters in 1901, this time drawing from Harriet's later life as a widow. In 1947 Iris Leveson-Gower, another descendant, published a volume of letters written in the years before Harriet's marriage. In 1990 Virginia Surtees produced another edited collection that focuses on Harriet's time as a social hostess as well as her close relationship with Georgiana.

== Issue ==
Earl and Countess Granville had five children:

- Lady Susan Georgiana Leveson-Gower (25 October 1810 – 30 April 1866); in 1833, she married George Pitt-Rivers, 4th Baron Rivers.
- Lady Georgiana Charlotte Leveson-Gower (23 September 1812 – 19 January 1885); in 1833, she married Alexander Fullerton.
- Granville Leveson-Gower, 2nd Earl Granville (11 May 1815 – 31 March 1891); in 1840, he married Marie-Louise de Dalberg, daughter and heiress of Emmerich Joseph de Dalberg; after her death in 1860 he remarried to Castila Campbell in 1865.
- The Honorable Granville William Leveson-Gower (28 September 1816 – 26 May 1833); he died unmarried.
- The Honorable Frederick Leveson-Gower (3 May 1819 – 30 May 1907); in 1851, he married Lady Margaret Compton, daughter of Spencer Compton, 2nd Marquess of Northampton.

== Ancestry ==
Ancestors of Harriet Leveson-Gower, Countess Granville

8. William Cavendish, 3rd Duke of Devonshire
4. William Cavendish, 4th Duke of Devonshire
9. Katherine Hoskyns
2. William Cavendish, 5th Duke of Devonshire
10. Richard Boyle, 3rd Earl of Burlington
5. Charlotte Boyle, 6th Baroness Clifford
11. Lady Dorothy Savile
1. Harriet Leveson-Gower, Countess Granville
12. Lord John Spencer
6. John Spencer, 1st Earl Spencer
13. Lady Georgiana Carolina Carteret
3. Lady Georgiana Spencer
14. Stephen Poyntz
7. Margaret Georgiana Poyntz
15. Anna Maria Mordaunt
