= Granville Leveson-Gower, 1st Earl Granville =

British politician and diplomat (1773–1846)

The Right Honourable The Earl Granville GCB PC
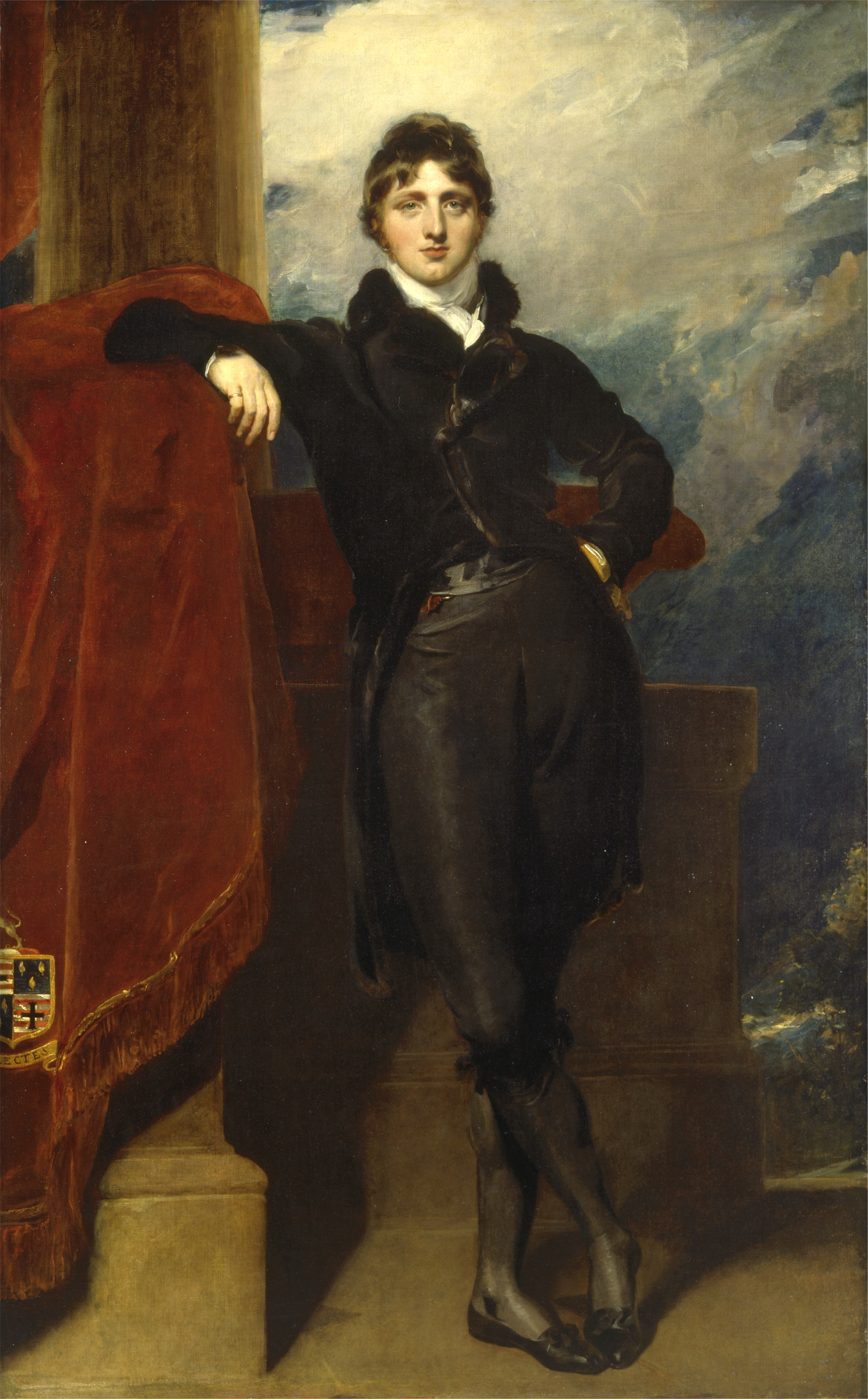
- Portrait by Thomas Lawrence, 1804–1809

Ambassador to Russia
- In office 1804–1805
- Preceded by: Sir John Borlase Warren, Bt
- Succeeded by: The Lord Cathcart
- In office 1807–1812
- Preceded by: The Marquess of Douglas and Clydesdale
- Succeeded by: The Viscount Cathcart

Ambassador to France
- In office 1824–1828
- Preceded by: Charles Stuart
- Succeeded by: The Lord Stuart de Rothesay
- In office 1830–1835
- Preceded by: The Lord Stuart de Rothesay
- Succeeded by: The Lord Cowley
- In office 1835–1841
- Preceded by: The Lord Cowley
- Succeeded by: The Lord Cowley

Personal details
- Born: 12 October 1773
- Died: 8 January 1846 (aged 72)
- Party: Whig
- Spouse: Lady Harriet Cavendish (m. 1809)
- Children: Harriet Osborne, Baroness Godolphin; George Stewart; Susan Pitt-Rivers, Baroness Rivers; Lady Georgiana Fullerton; Granville Leveson-Gower, 2nd Earl Granville; Hon. Granville William Leveson-Gower; Hon. Frederick Leveson-Gower
- Parents: Granville Leveson-Gower, 1st Marquess of Stafford; Lady Susanna Stewart
- Education: Christ Church, Oxford

Granville Leveson-Gower, 1st Earl Granville GCB, PC (/ˈluːsənˈɡɔːr/ LOOS-ən-GOR; 12 October 1773 – 8 January 1846), styled Lord Granville Leveson-Gower from 1786 to 1815 and The Viscount Granville from 1815 to 1833, was a British Whig statesman and diplomat from the Leveson-Gower family.

== Background and education ==
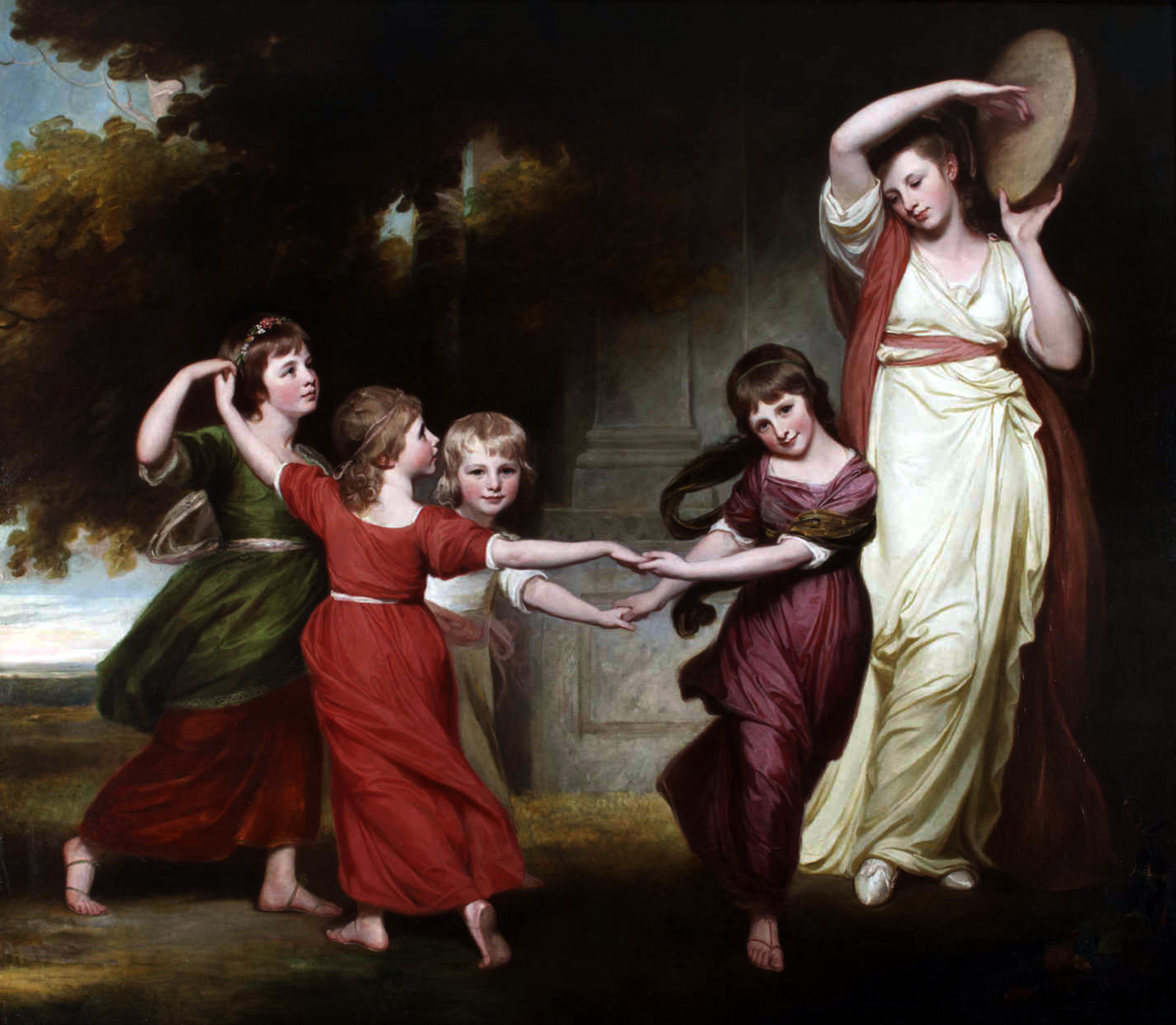
Young Granville (center) with his family (c. 1776 portrait by George Romney)

Granville was the second son and youngest child of Granville Leveson-Gower, 1st Marquess of Stafford from his marriage to Lady Susanna Stewart, daughter of Alexander Stewart, 6th Earl of Galloway. His elder, paternal half-brother was George Leveson-Gower, 1st Duke of Sutherland.

Granville was educated at Dr. Kyle's school at Hammersmith, and then privately by John Chappel Woodhouse. He matriculated at Christ Church, Oxford, in April 1789 but never took a degree. Nevertheless, ten years later, in 1799, the honorary degree of DCL was conferred upon him.

== Career ==
Granville began his career as a member of the House of Commons, representing Lichfield from 1795 to 1799, and Staffordshire for the next sixteen years. From 1797 to 1799 he was Colonel of the 2nd Staffordshire Militia. Granville served as British ambassador to Russia (10 August 1804 – 28 November 1805 and 1806–1807) and France (1824–1828, 1830–1835, 1835–1841).

In 1815 he was raised to the peerage as Viscount Granville of Stone Park in the County of Stafford. In 1833 during his second stint as ambassador to France, he was created Earl Granville and also Baron Leveson of Stone Park in the County of Stafford.

== Personal life ==
While a recent historian describes Granville as "a drab figure, the original stuffed-shirt – starch outside, sawdust within", he was celebrated as a male beauty in his own time, with Prime Minister William Pitt the Younger comparing him to "Hadrian's Antinous".

Lord Granville married Lady Harriet Cavendish (1785–1862), daughter of William Cavendish, 5th Duke of Devonshire, and Lady Georgiana Spencer, in 1809. They had three sons and two daughters:

- Lady Susan Georgiana (25 October 1810 – 30 April 1866) married George Pitt-Rivers, 4th Baron Rivers. Together they had twelve children, eight of whom survived infancy.
- Lady Georgiana Charlotte (23 September 1812 – 19 January 1885)
- Granville George (11 May 1815 – 31 March 1891), succeeded his father.
- Hon. William Henry (2 October 1816 – 26 May 1833), died after several years of paraplegia believed to have been caused by an infection.
- Hon. Edward Frederick (3 May 1819 – 30 May 1907)

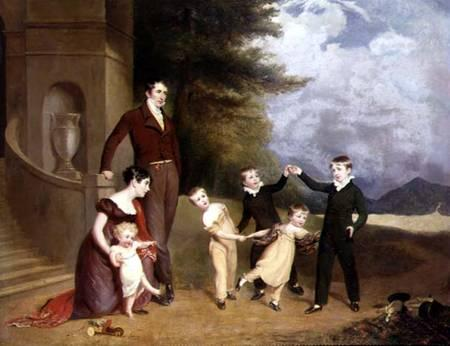
Granville Leveson-Gower, 1st Earl Granville with his wife Harriet and their children. Painting by Thomas Phillips, c.1815

Prior to marrying Lady Harriet Cavendish in 1809, Granville was the lover of Lady Harriet's maternal aunt, Henrietta Ponsonby, Countess of Bessborough (née Lady Henrietta Frances Spencer), with whom he fathered two illegitimate children: Harriette Stewart and George Stewart. For seventeen years, she "loved [Granville] to idolatry", but then, she understood that he must marry in order to further his career and assure his posterity, and so she actively collaborated in the arrangements for his wedding to Lady Harriet (known in the family as "Harry-O"), who was understandably reluctant to marry her aunt's lover.

Granville had numerous other love affairs, including with Lady Hester Stanhope, the adventurer and antiquarian, who attempted suicide after he jilted her in 1804. It was speculated at the time, and by her biographers since, that Stanhope was pregnant at the time with Granville's child.

Lord Granville died in January 1846, aged 72. The Countess Granville died in November 1862, aged 77.

Parliament of Great Britain
Preceded by Thomas Gilbert; Thomas Anson	Member of Parliament for Lichfield; 1795–1799; With: Thomas Anson	Succeeded by Sir John Wrottesley; Thomas Anson
Preceded by Earl Gower; Sir Edward Littleton, Bt	Member of Parliament for Staffordshire; 1799–1801; With: Sir Edward Littleton, Bt	Succeeded by Parliament of the United Kingdom
Parliament of the United Kingdom
Preceded by Parliament of Great Britain	Member of Parliament for Staffordshire; 1801–1815; With: Sir Edward Littleton, Bt 1801–1812; Edward John Littleton 1812–1815	Succeeded by Earl Gower; Edward John Littleton
Diplomatic posts
Preceded by Sir John Borlase Warren, Bt	British Ambassador to Russia; 1804–1805	Succeeded by The Lord Cathcart
Preceded by Marquess of Douglas and Clydesdale	British Ambassador to Russia; 1807–1812	Vacant Treaties of Tilsit Title next held by The Viscount Cathcart
Preceded by Sir Charles Stuart	British Ambassador to France; 1824–1828	Succeeded by The Lord Stuart de Rothesay
Preceded by The Lord Stuart de Rothesay	British Ambassador to France; 1830–1835	Succeeded by The Lord Cowley
Preceded by The Lord Cowley	British Ambassador to France; 1835–1841	Succeeded by The Lord Cowley
Political offices
Preceded by Sir James Murray-Pulteney, Bt	Secretary at War; 1809	Succeeded by The Viscount Palmerston
Peerage of the United Kingdom
New creation	Earl Granville; 2nd creation 1833–1846	Succeeded by Granville Leveson-Gower
New creation	Viscount Granville; 1815–1846	Succeeded by Granville Leveson-Gower
