= Farnham Royal =

Village in Buckinghamshire, England

Coordinates: 51.5386°N 0.6164°W

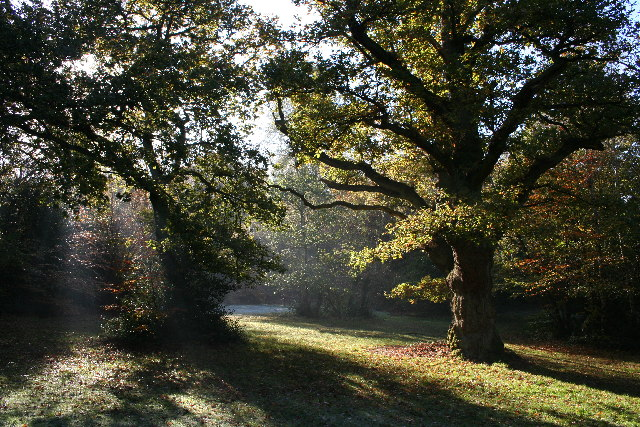
- Part of Burnham Beeches in Farnham Royal, a protected ancient woodland.

- Location within Buckinghamshire
- Area: 4.47 km^{2} (1.73 sq mi)
- Population: 5,972 (2011 census)
  - Density: 1,336/km^{2} (3,460/sq mi)
- OS grid reference: SU9683
- Civil parish: Farnham Royal
- Unitary authority: Buckinghamshire
- Ceremonial county: Buckinghamshire
- Region: South East
- Country: England
- Sovereign state: United Kingdom
- Post town: SLOUGH
- Postcode district: SL2
- Dialling code: 01753
- Police: Thames Valley
- Fire: Buckinghamshire
- Ambulance: South Central
- UK Parliament: Beaconsfield

Farnham Royal is a village and civil parish within Buckinghamshire, England. It is in the south of the county, immediately north of Slough (with which it is contiguous), and around 22 miles west of Charing Cross, Central London. Within the parish boundary is the village of Farnham Common and the hamlet of Farnham Park.

== History ==
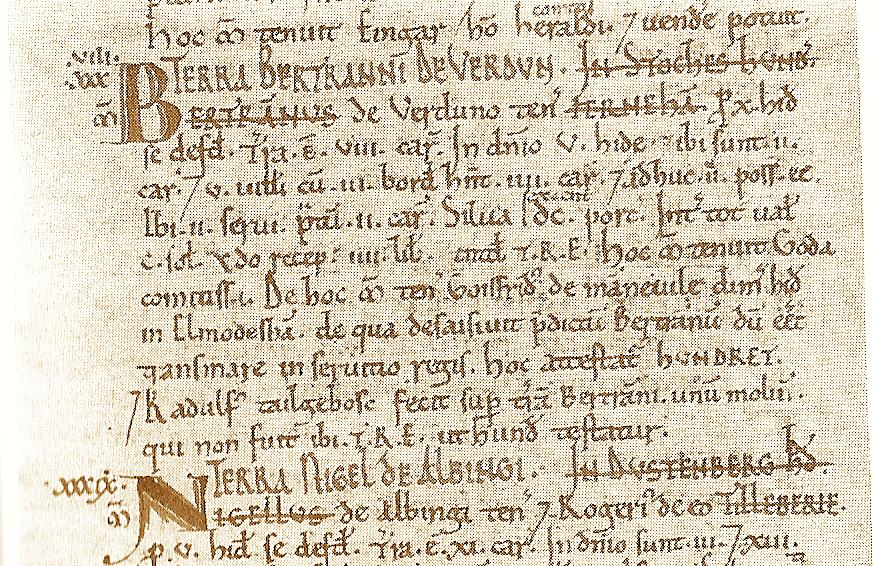
A view of Farnham Royal's entry in 'Domesday Book'

The village name 'Farnham' is Anglo Saxon in origin, and means 'homestead where ferns grow'. In the Domesday Book of 1086 the village was recorded as Ferneham.

The affix or suffix 'Royal' was given to the village in the late 11th century by the king, who gave the lord of the manor of Farnham, Bertram de Verdun, the Grand Serjeanty on the condition of providing a glove and putting it on the king's right hand at the coronation, and supporting his right arm, while the Royal sceptre was in his hand (see also Manor of Worksop).

In 1832, Francis Osborne was created Baron Godolphin, of Farnham Royal in the County of Buckingham.

From 1952 to 1957, Barnardo's operated a home for girls at Long Close on Black Pond Lane.

== Amenities ==
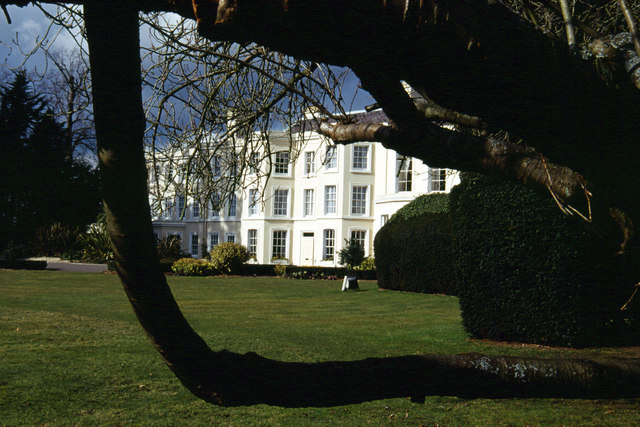
Hotel with adjacent golf course and forest narrowly within the parish boundary

The two largest categories of land use are green space which is forest or golf course (Burnham Beeches which has a hotel and café) and secondly domestic gardens which accounted for 34% of land use as at the 2011 census.

At a focal point of the developed village hub, on the site of two mini-roundabouts, stood the old water pump, removed in the 1970s to a museum. Just after 2000 the water pump was brought back is on the green nearby, next to the Duke's Head pub.

Farnham Park National Baseball & Softball Complex, the UK's only purpose-built baseball and softball facility, is also located within Farnham Park Playing Fields, and is operated by BaseballSoftballUK.

Farnham Park also plays host to Farnham Royal Rugby Club, formerly Old Pennanians Rugby Club. Founded in 1962, the club has always played in Farnham Park and is drenched in Rugby history. The Australian Rugby World Cup winning side of 1999 trained at Farnham Royal Rugby Club and made the 1st Team captain, Oli Isernia, an honorary squad member who was present with them upon their win and was invited to the changing room and trophy ceremony. Presently, Farnham Royal Rugby Club play out of Farnham Park in the Bucks, Berks and Oxon 3 South League, after obtaining promotion in the 2022/23 season.

== Demography ==
At the 2001 UK census, Farnham Royal's ethnicity was 92.9% white, 1.3% mixed race, 5% Asian, 0.4% black and 0.4% other. The place of birth of residents was 87.7% United Kingdom, 1.2% Republic of Ireland, 2.6% other Western European countries, and 8.5% elsewhere. Religion was recorded as 75.7% Christian, 0.3% Buddhist, 1.3% Hindu, 1.4% Sikh, 0.5% Jewish, and 1.1% Muslim. 12.7% were recorded as having no religion, 0.2% had an alternative religion and 6.8% did not state their religion.

The economic activity of residents aged 16–74 was 39% in full-time employment, 11% in part-time employment, 14.4% self-employed, 1.7% unemployed, 2.2% students with jobs, 2.7% students without jobs, 16.9% retired, 8.2% looking after home or family, 2% permanently sick or disabled and 2% economically inactive for other reasons. The industry of employment of residents was 15.4% retail, 13% manufacturing, 4.5% construction, 24.8% real estate, 8.4% health and social work, 7.6% education, 8% transport and communications, 2.9% public administration, 3.7% hotels and restaurants, 3.9% finance, 0.7% agriculture and 7.1% other. Compared with national figures, the ward had a relatively high proportion of workers in real estate, transport and communications. According to Office for National Statistics estimates, during the period of April 2001 to March 2002 the average gross weekly income of households was £1,070, compared with an average of £660 in South East England. Of the ward's residents aged 16–74, 34% had a higher education qualification or the equivalent, compared with 19.9% nationwide.

2011 Published Statistics: Population, home ownership and extracts from Physical Environment, surveyed in 2005
Output area	Homes owned outright	Owned with a loan	Socially rented	Privately rented	Other	km^{2} roads	km^{2} water	km^{2} domestic gardens	km^{2} domestic buildings	km^{2} non-domestic buildings	Usual residents	km^{2}
Civil parish	895	836	263	233	34	0.316	0.003	1.470	0.220	0.040	5972	4.47

== Education ==
The private boys preparatory school Caldicott School has alumni including deputy prime minister Nick Clegg and England cricket captain Andrew Strauss.
