= Francis Godolphin, 2nd Baron Godolphin =

British politician and peer

Francis Godolphin, 2nd Baron Godolphin (2 November 1706 – 25 May 1785) was a British politician and peer.

== Life and career ==
He was the eldest surviving son of Henry Godolphin, provost of Eton and Dean of St Paul's, and was educated at Eton College (1718–1721) and Queen’s College, Oxford (1723). In 1733 he inherited his father's estates in Buckinghamshire.

He was appointed as Lieutenant-Governor of the Scilly Isles from 1739 to 1766 and as Governor from 1766 to his death. He served as Member of Parliament (MP) for the borough of Helston in Cornwall from 1741 to 1766, when he succeeded to the title of Baron Godolphin (of Helston) on the death of his cousin Francis Godolphin, 2nd Earl of Godolphin. He was also the recorder for Helston from 1766 to his death.

He married twice: firstly on 18 February 1733/4 at Saint James in Westminster, London, to Lady Barbara Bentinck, the daughter of William Bentinck, 1st Earl of Portland, and, secondly, to Lady Anne Fitzwilliam (22 Aug 1722 – 1805), the daughter of John Fitzwilliam, 2nd Earl Fitzwilliam, on 28 May 1747, also at St James, Westminster.

Parliament of Great Britain
Preceded by John Evelyn; John Harris	Member of Parliament for Helston; 1741–1766; With: Thomas Walker; Sir John Evelyn	Succeeded by William Windham; Sir John Evelyn
Honorary titles
Preceded by The Earl of Godolphin	Governor of the Isles of Scilly; 1766–1785	Succeeded by Marquess of Carmarthen
Peerage of Great Britain
Preceded by Francis Godolphin	Baron Godolphin; 1766–1785	Extinct
