= Stapleford, Cambridgeshire =

Village in Cambridgeshire, England

Coordinates: 52.142°N 0.154°E

Stapleford
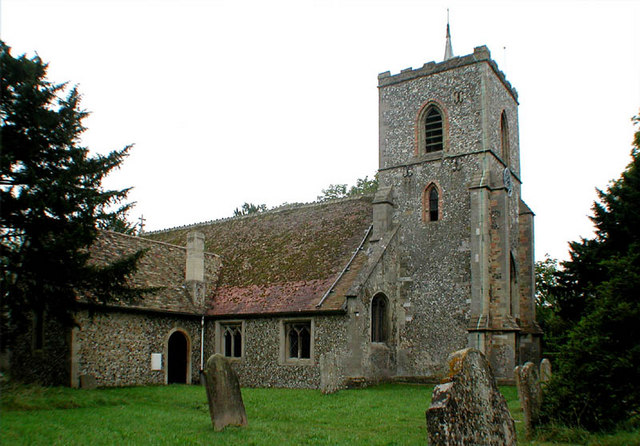
- St Andrew's Church

- Location within Cambridgeshire
- Population: 1,871 (2011 Census)
- OS grid reference: TL470517
- Shire county: Cambridgeshire
- Region: East
- Country: England
- Sovereign state: United Kingdom
- Post town: CAMBRIDGE
- Postcode district: CB22
- Dialling code: 01223
- Website: http://www.staplefordcambs.org.uk

Stapleford is a village located approximately 4 miles to the south of Cambridge, in the county of Cambridgeshire, in eastern England on the right-hand bank of the River Granta. Stapleford is first mentioned in 956 when it was given the Latinised name of Stapelforda, formerly Stapleton. Unlike most parishes, the spelling has hardly changed since then. The parish, however, was inhabited long before this. Wandlebury Ring, which lies within the parish boundary, is an Iron Age hill fort, originally built in the 3rd century BC, but rebuilt with a double bank in the 1st century AD. More recently, the village found fame with the discovery that Barack Obama is a direct descendant of one Thomas Blossom, who grew up here towards the end of the 16th century before emigrating to the United States.

Stapleford is home to two pubs, The Rose and The Three Horseshoes. The village also is home to Saint Andrew's church, a primary school, several garages, two hairdressers, allotments, a youth football club, a cricket team and several farms.

Famous ex-residents include the racing driver Robert Huff, and the Nobel laureates Sir John Sulston (Nobel Prize in Physiology or Medicine, 2002) and Sir James Mirrlees (Nobel Memorial Prize in Economic Sciences, 1996), both of whom died in 2018.

From 1750 to 1755, John Berridge, the later evangelist, served as curate in Stapleford near Cambridge, riding out from Clare College. He performed his duties with "a sincere desire to do good". He preached and taught "the importance of sanctification". Yet, as Berridge later reflected, his ministry in Stapleford was fruitless because he neither believed nor preached the gospel of justification by faith. Because he believed that he was having "no beneficial effect, spiritual or moral" on his congregation, he resigned, later to become vicar of Everton, near Sandy.

Stapleford is twinned with Villedomer, in the Loire region of France. Stapleford is also twinned with Nachingwea, one of the six districts in the Lindi Region of Tanzania.
