= Earl of Danby =

Extinct title in the Peerage of England

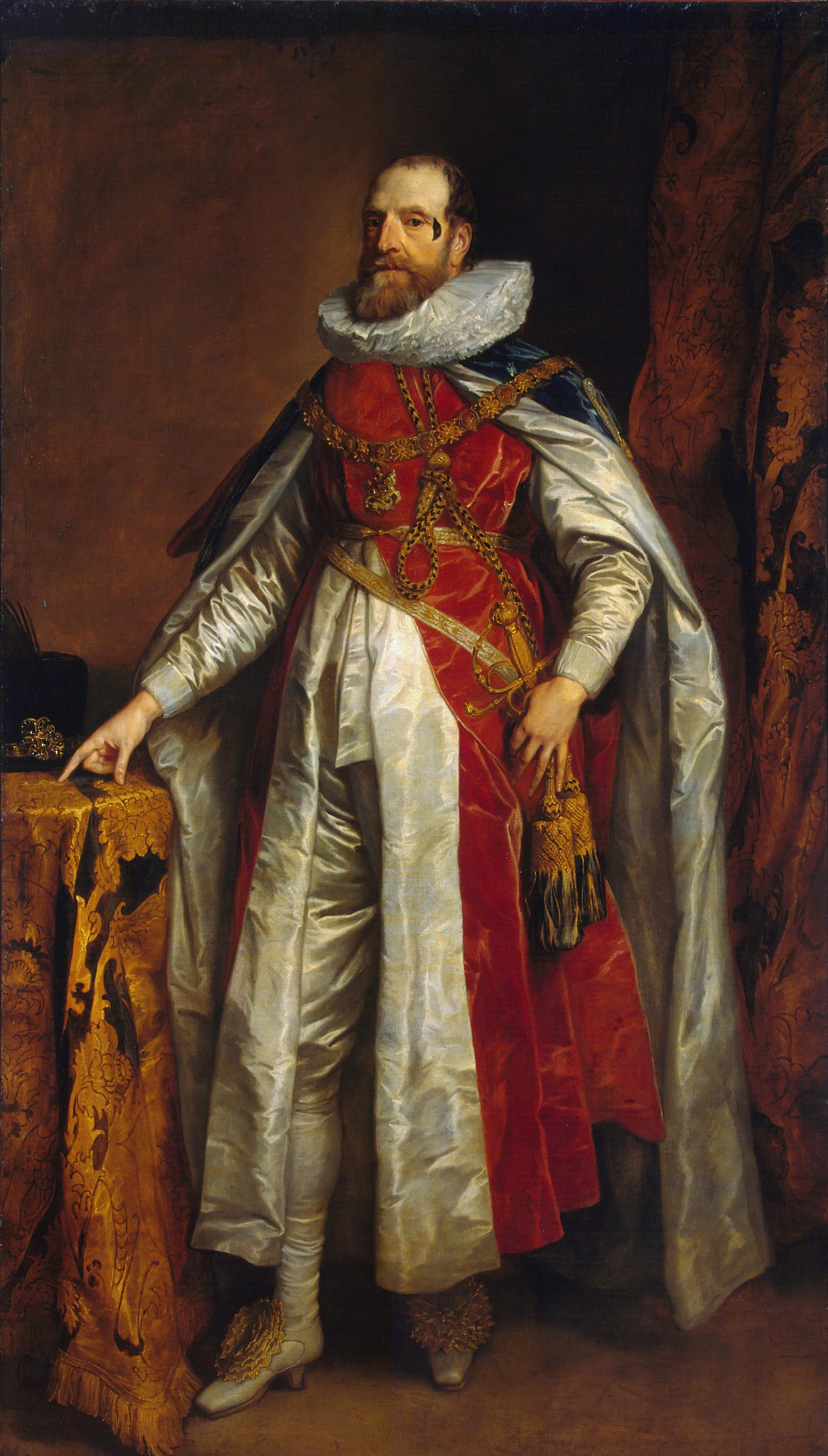
Henry Danvers, 1st Earl of Danby.

Earl of Danby was a title that was created twice in the Peerage of England. The first creation came in 1626 in favour of the soldier Henry Danvers, 1st Baron Danvers. He had already been created Baron Danvers, of Dauntsey in the County of Wiltshire, in 1603, also in the Peerage of England. The titles became extinct on his death in 1644. The second creation came in 1674 in favour of Thomas Osborne, 1st Viscount Latimer. He was the son of Anne, daughter of Thomas Walmesley and Eleanor Danvers, sister of the first Earl of the first creation. For more information on the second creation, see Duke of Leeds.

== Earls of Danby; First creation (1626) ==
- Henry Danvers, 1st Earl of Danby (1573–1644)

== Earls of Danby; Second creation (1674) ==
- see Duke of Leeds

== Family tree ==
Dukes of Leeds family tree

John Danvers (1540–1594)
Osborne Baronets, of Kiveton, 1620	Baron Danvers, of Dauntsey in the County of Wiltshire, 1603; Earl of Danby in the County of York (1st creation), 1626
Sir Edward Osborne, 1st Baronet (1596–1647); 1st Baronet	Eleanor Danvers	Henry Danvers (1573–1644); Earl of Danby and Baron Danvers
Earldom of Danby (1st creation) extinct, 1644
Anne Walmesley
Viscount Osborne of Dunblane, Baron Osborne of Kiveton in the County of York, and Viscount Latimer of Danby in the County of York, 1673; Earl of Danby (2nd creation) in the County of York, 1674; Marquess of Carmarthen, 1689; Duke of Leeds, 1694
Thomas Osborne (1632–1712); 1st Duke of Leeds, Marquess of Carmarthen, Earl of Danby, Viscount Osborne, Viscount Latimer, and Baron Osborne, 2nd Baronet
Viscounty of Osborne surrendered, 1674
Baron Godolphin of Rialton in the County of Cornwall (1st creation), 1684; Earl of Godolphin and Viscount Rialton, 1706
Edward Osborne (1655–1689) styled Viscount Latimer	Peregrine Osborne (1659–1729); 2nd Duke of Leeds, Marquess of Carmarthen, Earl of Danby, Viscount Osborne, Viscount Latimer, and Baron Osborne	Sidney Godolphin (1645–1712); 1st Earl of Godolphin, Viscount Rialton, and Baron Godolphin (of Rialton)	Henry Godolphin (1648–1733)
Baron Godolphin of Helston in the County of Cornwall (2nd creation), 1735
Peregrine Hyde Osborne (1691–1731); 3rd Duke of Leeds, Marquess of Carmarthen, Earl of Danby, Viscount Osborne, Viscount Latimer, and Baron Osborne	Francis Godolphin (1678–1766); 2nd Earl of Godolphin, Viscount Rialton, and Baron Godolphin (of Rialton); 1st Baron Godolphin (of Helston)	Francis Godolphin (1706–1785); 2nd Baron Godolphin (of Helston)
Earldom of Godolphin, viscounty of Rialton, and barony of Godolphin, extinct, 1766	Godolphin barony of Helston, extinct, 1785
Thomas Osborne (1713–1789); 4th Duke of Leeds, Marquess of Carmarthen, Earl of Danby, Viscount Osborne, Viscount Latimer, and Baron Osborne	Mary Godolphin (1723–1764)
Thomas Osborne (1747) styled Marquess of Carmarthen	Francis Godolphin Osborne (1751–1799); 5th Duke of Leeds, Marquess of Carmarthen, Earl of Danby, Viscount Osborne, Viscount Latimer, and Baron Osborne
Baron Godolphin of Farnham Royal in the County of Buckingham (3rd creation), 1832
George William Frederick Osborne (1775–1838); 6th Duke of Leeds, Marquess of Carmarthen, Earl of Danby, Viscount Osborne, Viscount Latimer, and Baron Osborne, 10th Baron Conyers, de jure 13th Baron Darcy de Knayth	Francis Godolphin Osborne (1777–1850); 1st Baron Godolphin (of Farnham Royal)
Francis Godolphin D'Arcy D'Arcy-Osborne (1798–1859); 7th Duke of Leeds, Marquess of Carmarthen, Earl of Danby, Viscount Osborne, Viscount Latimer, and Baron Osborne, 11th Baron Conyers, de jure 14th Baron Darcy de Knayth	George Godolphin Osborne (1802–1872); 8th Duke of Leeds, Marquess of Carmarthen, Earl of Danby, Viscount Osborne, Viscount Latimer, and Baron Osborne, 2nd Baron Godolphin (of Farnham Royal)	Sydney Godolphin Osborne (1808–1889)
George Godolphin Osborne (1828–1895); 9th Duke of Leeds, Marquess of Carmarthen, Earl of Danby, Viscount Osborne, Viscount Latimer, and Baron Osborne, 3rd Baron Godolphin (of Farnham Royal)	Sidney Francis Godolphin Osborne (1835–1903)
George Frederick Osborne styled Earl of Danby (1861)	George Godolphin Osborne (1862–1927); 10th Duke of Leeds, Marquess of Carmarthen, Earl of Danby, Viscount Osborne, Viscount Latimer, and Baron Osborne, 4th Baron Godolphin (of Farnham Royal)
John Francis Godolphin Osborne (1901–1963); 11th Duke of Leeds, Marquess of Carmarthen, Earl of Danby, Viscount Osborne, Viscount Latimer, and Baron Osborne, 6th Baron Godolphin (of Farnham Royal)	Francis D'Arcy Godolphin Osborne (1884–1964); 12th Duke of Leeds, Marquess of Carmarthen, Earl of Danby, Viscount Osborne, Viscount Latimer, and Baron Osborne, 5th Baron Godolphin (of Farnham Royal)
Dukedom extinct, 1964
