= Henry Thompson (1625–1683) =

English merchant and politician

Sir Henry Thompson

Member of the England Parliament for York
- In office 1673–1683
- Preceded by: Sir Metcalfe Robinson, 1st Bt
- Succeeded by: Sir Metcalfe Robinson, 1st Bt
- Preceded by: Sir Thomas Osborne, 1st Duke of Leeds
- Succeeded by: Sir John Reresby, 2nd Bt

Personal details
- Born: 1625 Kilham, East Riding of Yorkshire
- Died: 1683 (aged 57–58) Long Marston, North Yorkshire
- Spouse(s): Mary Thompson; Jane Newton; Susannah Lovell
- Children: Henry Thompson; Richard Thompson; Anne Thompson; Mary Thompson; Edward Thompson; Lovell Thompson; Alathea Thompson; Susanna Thompson
- Parent(s): Richard Thompson; Anne Nelthorpe
- Occupation: Wine Merchant

Sir Henry Thompson (1625–1683) was an English merchant and politician.

== Life and politics ==
Henry and his brother Edward Thompson were wine merchants of York. He was Lord Mayor of York in 1663, and was made a deputy lieutenant of the West Riding of Yorkshire in 1665. In 1668, Henry moved from York to a new country estate at Escrick, where he had been buying land for the past several years. After moving to Escrick, he briefly entered politics, and was a patron of Andrew Marvell. He moved once more before his death, to another estate at Long Marston, leaving Escrick to his eldest son. He was again Lord Mayor in 1672.

By his first wife, Mary Thompson, he had no children. By his second, Jane Newton (d. 1661), he had one son, Henry Thompson (1659–1700), to whom he left Escrick. By his third wife, Susannah Lovell (d. 1701), he had several children, including Edward Thompson (1670–1734), who would inherit Long Marston. Edward's eldest son, Edward Thompson (1697–1742), would become a prominent politician; Edward (senior)'s daughter, Henrietta, was the mother of James Wolfe. His third wife, Susannah was twice widowed.

His entry into politics in 1673 was contentious. One of the previous incumbents, Sir Thomas Osborne, had tried to stop Henry from taking his seat after he thought his son had been assured to be the favoured candidate.

Parliament of England
Preceded by Sir Metcalfe Robinson, Bt; Sir Thomas Osborne, Bt	Member for York; 1673–1683; With: Sir Metcalfe Robinson, Bt 1673–1679; Sir John Hewley 1679–1683	Succeeded by Sir John Reresby, Bt; Sir Metcalfe Robinson, Bt
