= Sir John Reresby, 2nd Baronet =

English politician and diarist (1634–1689)

Sir John Reresby, 2nd Baronet (14 April 1634 – 12 May 1689) was an English politician and diarist. After returning in 1667 from exile during the English Civil War, he became a Member of Parliament in 1673.

== Early life ==
Reresby was born at Thrybergh, Yorkshire in 1634, the eldest son of Sir John Reresby, the 1st Baronet. His mother, Frances, was daughter of Edmund Yarburgh of Snaith Hall, Yorkshire.

Reresby, in his Memoir and Travels, says that in 1652 he was admitted of Trinity College in Cambridge, but as the college refused to allow him the rank and privilege of a nobleman, he did not go into residence and no entry of his admission exists. In 1646, he had succeeded to the baronetage on the death of his father.

== Travels abroad ==
After the English Civil War, Reresby in 1654 went abroad, where he became a friend of Henrietta Maria, the widow of Charles I, whom he visited in France. The account he wrote of these travels appeared in his Memoirs, published 40 years after his death. They are invaluable to historians as sidelights on the dramatic times through which he lived. After his return to England, Reresby married Frances, elder daughter of William Browne of York, barrister-at-law, on 9 March 1665. They had five sons and four daughters.

== Election to Parliament ==
Soon after the Restoration, Reresby returned to England with a letter of recommendation from the Queen Mother, and was presented to the king at Whitehall. He served as Sheriff of Yorkshire in 1667. At a by-election in November 1673 he was returned to parliament for Aldborough in Yorkshire, together with Robert Benson. He took his seat in the House of Commons on 14 April 1675, his 41st birthday. Legal differences with the family of the Duke of Norfolk may have lain behind a false accusation made against Reresby: that he had caused his black servant to be gelded "and that the operation had killed him" on 20 October 1676. According to Reresby he had not been gelded and the cause of death was an "imposthume" (abscess) in the head (p. 149).

In 1678, he spoke in favour of giving aid to the king, and the following month obtained a commission for raising an independent company of foot, and was appointed governor of Bridlington. That December Reresby opposed Danby's impeachment.

At the general election in February 1679 he was again returned for Aldborough, but unseated on petition in the following May. In 1680, he drew up the Yorkshire petition of abhorrence, but took care to write it carefully so that no great exceptions could be taken. At the general election in February 1681, he was once more elected for Aldborough. In November following he was made a justice of the peace for Middlesex and Westminster, and in that capacity superintended the prosecution of Thomas Thynne's murderers in February 1682.

== King's man in York ==
On Halifax's recommendation, Reresby was appointed governor of York in April 1682. He assisted in the plot to obtain the forfeiture of the city's charter. At the general election after the death of Charles II, Reresby was elected for the city. Reresby took a prominent part in the House of Commons in supporting the court.

In November 1685 Reresby voted to obtain the concurrence of the House of Lords in the address passed by the Commons for the dismissal of the Roman Catholic officers and refused to sign an address of thanks to the King for "his late indulgence for liberty of conscience". Though he promised the King to stand for York at the next general election, Reresby had for some time past been growing lukewarm in the royal cause. On 22 November 1688, York Castle was seized by Danby and his adherents, who declared for the Prince of Orange in what would become known as the Glorious Revolution. Reresby was taken prisoner, but he later obtained parole and was allowed to retire to Thrybergh. Early the following year he went up to London and was presented to William by his friend Halifax. He died suddenly in 1689, aged 55, and was buried in St Leonard's Church, Thrybergh, where a monument was placed to his memory.

== Descendants ==
Reresby's eldest son, William, born in 1668, succeeded his father in the baronetcy. After a life of gambling away his fortune, he sold the family estate to John Savile of Methley in 1705 and died in Fleet prison. Tamworth, the second son, was born in 1670. John, the third son, died in 1683, George in 1689. Leonard, the youngest son, born in 1679, succeeded his brother William as the fourth baronet, and died unmarried in 1748, when the baronetcy became extinct.

== Bibliography ==
- James J. Cartwright, ed., The Memoirs of Sir John Reresby, 1634-1689. London: Longmans, Green, and Co, 1875

Parliament of England
Preceded by Sir Solomon Swale, Bt; Francis Goodricke	Member of Parliament for Aldborough; 1673–1679; With: Sir Solomon Swale, Bt 1673–78; Ruisshe Wentworth 1678–79; Henry Arthington 1679	Succeeded by Henry Arthington; Sir Godfrey Copley, Bt
Preceded by Sir Godfrey Copley, Bt; Sir Brian Stapylton, Bt	Member of Parliament for Aldborough; 1681–1685; With: Sir Godfrey Copley, Bt; Henry Arthington 1679	Succeeded by Sir Michael Wentworth; Sir Roger Strickland
Preceded by Sir Henry Thompson; Sir John Hewley	Member of Parliament for York; 1685–1689; With: Sir Metcalfe Robinson, Bt	Succeeded by Earl of Danby; Edward Thompson
Baronetage of England
Preceded by John Reresby	Baronet (of Thribergh); 1646–1689	Succeeded by William Reresby
