= Tobias Jenkins =

Member of the England Parliament for York
- In office 1694–1698
- Preceded by: Robert Waller; Henry Thompson (1659–1700)
- Succeeded by: Sir William Robinson, Bt
- In office 1698–1701
- Preceded by: Edward Thompson
- Succeeded by: Edward Thompson; Sir William Robinson, Bt
- In office 1701–1705
- Preceded by: Sir William Robinson, Bt; Edward Thompson
- Succeeded by: Robert Benson; Robert Fairfax
- In office 1715–1722
- Preceded by: Sir William Robinson, Bt; Robert Fairfax
- Succeeded by: Sir William Milner; Edward Thompson Jr

Personal details
- Born: 1660 Grimstone, York
- Died: 1730 (aged 69–70) Acomb, York
- Spouse: Lady Mary Paulet
- Children: Elizabeth; Mary; William; Tobias; Anthonina

Tobias Jenkins was one of two Members of the Parliament of England for the constituency of York between 1694 and 1705. He again represented the city as MP in the Parliament of Great Britain between 1715–1722.

== Life and politics ==
Tobias Jenkins, born in 1660, was the son of Colonel Tobias Jenkins and his wife, Antonyna Wickham. His paternal grandfather, Sir Henry Jenkins was also MP for Boroughbridge. He was made freeman of the city of York on 2 October 1695 just prior to being returned as MP for the city.

Tobias did not stand in the first elections of 1701 as he had been elected Lord Mayor of York. He did stand in the second elections of that year and was returned after a contest. He stood down in 1705 in favour of his nephew Robert Benson. He next stood for election on 1713 after Benson had been made a peer. Tobias was defeated by Robert Fairfax, but was successful in the same contest in 1715.

Tobias was married twice. First to Lady Mary Paulet, daughter of Charles, Duke of Bolton. They had two children. Elizabeth and Mary, who married Sir Henry Goodricke, 4th Baronet of Ribston, in York Minster on 26 April 1707. He had three children by his second marriage, William, Tobias and Anthonina.

He died intestate in 1730.

Political offices
Preceded by Robert Waller; Henry Thompson (1659–1700)	Member of Parliament; 1695–1698	Next: Tobias Jenkins; Sir William Robinson, Bt
Preceded by Tobias Jenkins; Edward Thompson	Member of Parliament; 1698–1701	Next: Sir William Robinson, Bt; Edward Thompson
Preceded by Sir William Robinson, Bt; Edward Thompson	Member of Parliament; 1701–1705	Next: Robert Benson; Robert Fairfax
Preceded by Robert Fairfax; Sir William Robinson, Bt	Member of Parliament; 1715–1722	Next: Sir William Milner; Edward Thompson Jr
