= Long Marston Manor =

Manor house in Long Marston, North Yorkshire, England

Coordinates: 53°57′07″N 1°14′01″W

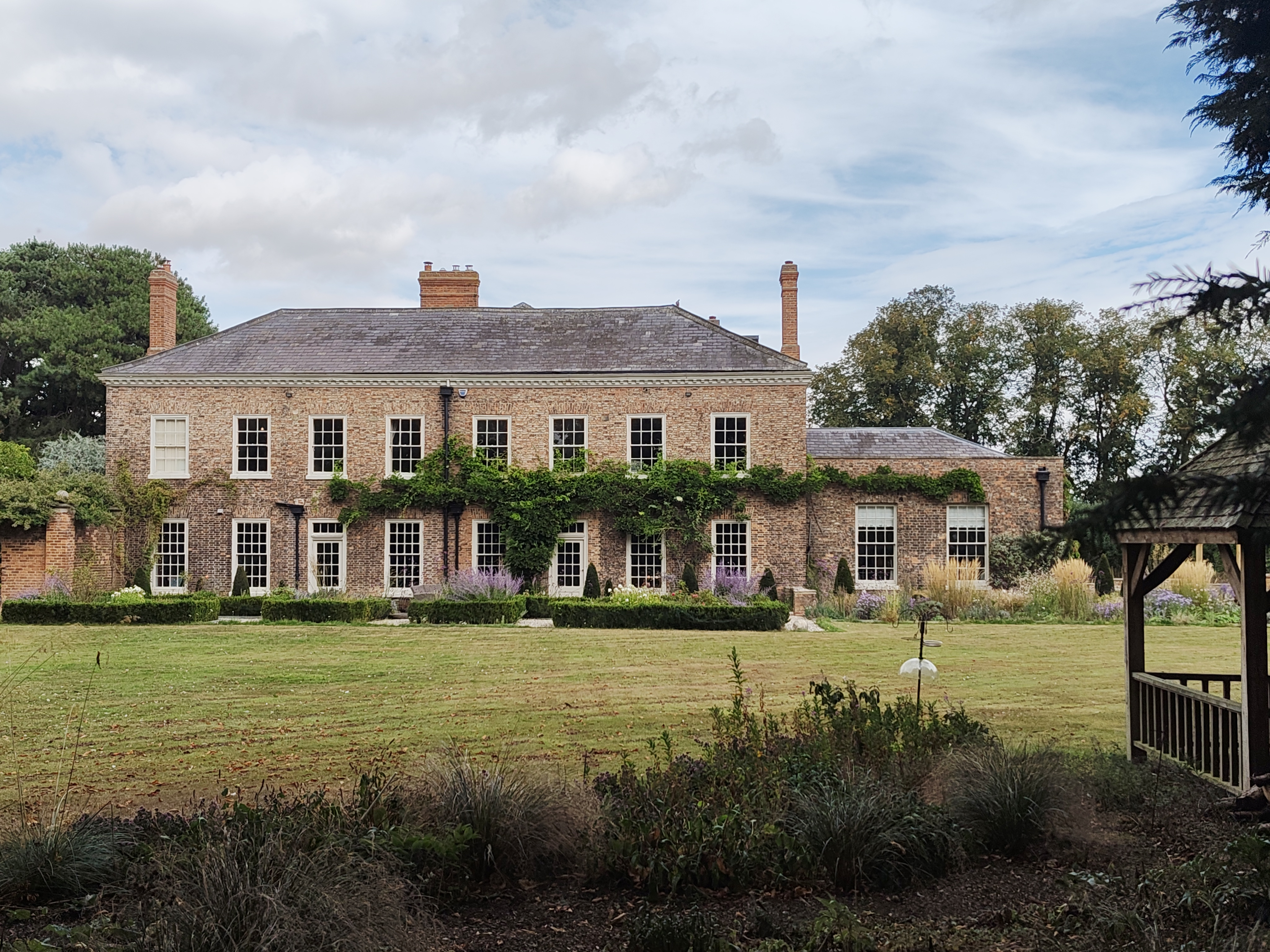
The building, in 2025

Long Marston Manor is a historic building in Long Marston, North Yorkshire, a village in England.

The house was built in about 1800, as the rectory for the neighbouring All Saints' Church, Long Marston. The building was sold by the church in 1939, when it was restored for use as a private house. In 1988, it was converted into a nursing home, but in 2002 was re-converted into a private house. It was marketed for sale in 2008 for up to £3 million, at which time, it had six bedrooms, four reception rooms, plus a garden room, music room and kitchen, and 2.5 acres (1.0 ha) of grounds. It has been grade II listed since 1952.

The house is built of red brick, with a modillion eaves cornice, and a hipped purple slate roof. There are two storeys, fronts of eight and two bays, a slightly recessed two-bay block on the right, and a lower two-storey three-bay service wing on the left. On the garden front are sash windows in architraves with flat brick arches. On the left return is a porch with Tuscan columns, an entablature and a deep dentilled cornice, and a doorway with panelled rebates and a fanlight in an architrave. Inside, it has the original pine doors and case iron fireplaces, with other features dating from 1939.

== See also ==
- Listed buildings in Long Marston, North Yorkshire
