= Listed buildings in Long Marston, North Yorkshire =

Long Marston is a civil parish in the county of North Yorkshire, England. It contains nine listed buildings that are recorded in the National Heritage List for England. Of these, one is listed at Grade I, the highest of the three grades, one is at Grade II*, the middle grade, and the others are at Grade II, the lowest grade. The parish contains the villages of Long Marston and Angram and the surrounding countryside. Most of the listed buildings are houses, and the others are a church and a milepost.

== Key ==
| Grade | Criteria |
|---|---|
| I | Buildings of exceptional interest, sometimes considered to be internationally important |
| II* | Particularly important buildings of more than special interest |
| II | Buildings of national importance and special interest |

== Buildings ==
| Name and location | Photograph | Date | Notes | Grade |
|---|---|---|---|---|
| All Saints' Church; 53.95060°N 1.23177°W | | c. 1400 | The church, which incorporates earlier material, has been altered and extended through the centuries. The tower is built in stone, the nave and chancel are in coursed cobble on a limestone plinth, and the roof is in stone slate. The church consists of a nave, a north aisle, a north transept, a chancel, and a west tower. The tower has three stages, a stair tower to the south, a two-light west window with a clock face above, two-light openings in the middle stage, two-light bell openings, a string course, and an embattled parapet with gargoyles and crocketed pinnacles. The south door has a round-arched head, and three orders of colonnettes and waterleaf capitals. | I |
| The Old Thatch; 53.95196°N 1.23541°W | | 16th century | The house has a timber framed core, it is enclosed in brick and cobble, and it has a thatched roof. There is one storey and an attic, two bays, and front and rear aisles. To the right is a single-storey two-bay extension with a pantile roof. Most of the windows are horizontally-sliding sashes. Inside, there are substantial remains of timber framing. | II |
| Long Marston Hall; 53.95550°N 1.23808°W | | Late 17th century | A house and a warehouse, later combined, it is in red brick with quoins and a hipped pantile roof. There are two storeys and attics, and an L-shaped plan, with a three-bay entrance range, a projecting two-bay wing and a three-bay block at the rear. The doorway in the entrance range has a fanlight, and the windows are sashes in architraves, with slightly cambered stretcher arches. | II* |
| The Old Granary; 53.95523°N 1.23781°W | | Late 17th century | Originally a wing of Long Marston Hall, the house is in red brick, with stone quoins, a floor band, and a pantile roof. There are two storeys, and fronts of two and three bays, with the gable end facing the road. In the right return is a blocked cambered-arched cart entrance with double doors inserted. Some of the windows are sashes, and the others are later small pane windows. | II |
| Lodore and The Old Post Office; 53.95336°N 1.23666°W | | Early 18th century | Two houses combined into one, in red brick, with a string course, a dentilled eaves cornice and a pantile roof. There are two storeys and five bays. The central doorway has a fanlight, there is an inserted door to the right, and the windows are sashes in architraves, with flat brick arches. | II |
| Sycamore Farmhouse; 53.93095°N 1.20922°W | — | Mid 18th century | The house is in brick, with a string course, a modillion eaves cornice, and a grey slate roof with tumbled-in brickwork on the left gable, There are two storeys and four bays. On the front is a doorway, and the windows are sashes. Inside, there is an inglenook fireplace. | II |
| Poplar Farmhouse; 53.95937°N 1.24441°W | | Late 18th century | The house is in red-brown brick, with dressings in darker red-blue brick, a floor band, a dentilled eaves cornice, and a tile roof with raised gables and tumbled-in brickwork. There are two storeys and four bays. The doorway has pilasters and a modillion cornice, and the windows are sashes in architraves with segmental stretcher arches. In the left return is a recessed doorway. | II |
| Long Marston Manor; 53.95195°N 1.23359°W | | Late 18th to early 19th century | A rectory, later a private house, in red brick, with a modillion eaves cornice, and a hipped purple slate roof. There are two storeys, fronts of eight and two bays, a slightly recessed two-bay block on the right, and a lower two-storey three-bay service wing on the left. On the garden front are sash windows in architraves with flat brick arches. On the left return is a porch with Tuscan columns, an entablature and a deep dentilled cornice, and a doorway with panelled rebates and a fanlight in an architrave. | II |
| Milepost; 53.94839°N 1.25823°W | | Late 19th century | The milepost is on the south side of Wetherby Road (B1224 road). It is in gritstone, with a cast iron face, a triangular plan and a sloping top, and is about 1 metre (3 ft 3 in) high. The top is inscribed "Collingham and York Road" and "Long Marston", on the left face are the distances to Wetherby, Collingham and Leeds, and on the right face to York. | II |
