= Henry Thompson (1659–1700) =

English landowner and politician

Henry Thompson (7 June 1659 – 6 July 1700) was an English landowner and politician.

The eldest son of Sir Henry Thompson, a wine merchant of York, he inherited his father's estate of Escrick in 1683. He had already lived there for some time during his father's life, and remodeled the old house between 1680 and 1690. He was then Member of Parliament for York for five years, and, like his father, was Lord Mayor of York, in 1699.

By his first wife, Frances Swann, he had a daughter, Frances, who married her second cousin once removed, Leonard Thompson of Sheriff Hutton. By his second wife, Mary Beilby, he had a son, Beilby Thompson (d. 1750), who inherited Escrick.

Parliament of England
| Preceded by Earl of Danby; Edward Thompson | Member of Parliament for York; 1690–1695; With: Robert Waller | Succeeded by Tobias Jenkins; Edward Thompson |
