= William Allanson =

English draper and politician (died 1656)

Sir William Allanson (died 6 December 1656) was an English merchant draper and politician who sat in the House of Commons from 1640 to 1653.

Allanson was the son of Christopher Allanson of Ampleforth, North Yorkshire. He was a draper and became a freeman of the city of York in 1610. He was twice Lord Mayor of York, once when he was knighted by King Charles I at York on his visit there 26 May 1633.

In November 1640, Allanson was elected Member of Parliament for York in the Long Parliament.

Allanson was buried at St Michael le Belfrey, York on 7 December 1656.

Allanson married firstly on 12 December 1621 Lucy Orracke, daughter of Alexander Orracke. She died in September 1631. He married secondly in 1632 to Anne Tancred, daughter of Charles Tancred.

Parliament of England
Preceded by Sir Edward Osborne, Bt; Sir Roger Jaques	Member of Parliament for York; 1640–1653; With: Thomas Hoyle	Succeeded by Thomas St. Nicholas
