= Peregrine Osborne, 2nd Duke of Leeds =

English politician

Admiral His Grace The Duke of Leeds MP
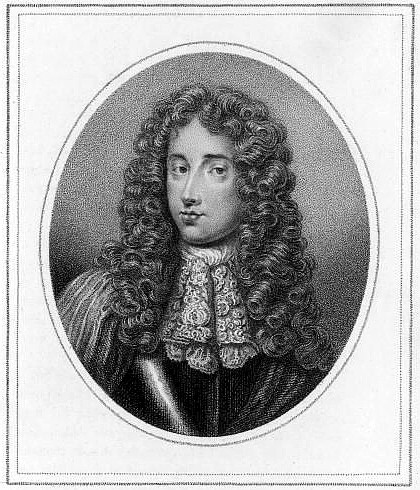
- The Duke of Leeds. Stipple engraving after Jean Petitot, c.1710
- Born: Baptised 29 December 1659; Harthill, Yorkshire
- Died: 25 June 1729
- Burial place: Aldbury, Hertfordshire
- Military career
- Allegiance: Kingdom of England; Kingdom of Great Britain
- Branch: Royal Navy
- Service years: c.1691–1712
- Rank: Admiral of the Red
- Commands: HMS Suffolk; HMS Royal William
- Conflicts: Monmouth Rebellion; Battle of Sedgemoor (WIA); Nine Years' War; Battle of La Hougue; Battle of Camaret; War of the Spanish Succession

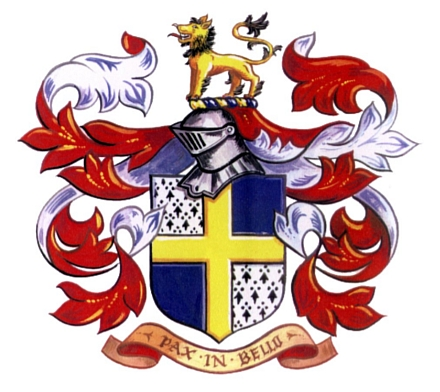
Ancestral arms of the Osborne family, Dukes of Leeds

Admiral Peregrine Osborne, 2nd Duke of Leeds (bap. 29 December 1659 – 25 June 1729), styled Viscount Osborne between 1673 and 1689, Earl of Danby between 1689 and 1694 and Marquess of Carmarthen between 1694 and 1712, was an English Tory politician.

== Background ==
Osborne was the second son of the Thomas Osborne (later 1st Duke of Leeds) and his wife, Bridget, a daughter of the Montagu Bertie, 2nd Earl of Lindsey. In 1673, his father was created Viscount Osborne in the Peerage of Scotland, but surrendered the title in favour of Peregrine when the former was created Viscount Latimer in the Peerage of England later that year.

== Political career ==
In 1677, Osborne sat in Parliament as member of parliament for Berwick-upon-Tweed and then briefly for Corfe Castle when he succeeded his brother to the seat in 1679. In 1689, he briefly sat in Parliament again, this time for York. He held the seat for almost a year when he left the Commons in 1689 after being called up to House of Lords in his father's barony of Osborne.

From then on, however, he did not take an active role in the Lords, instead choosing a career in the Royal Navy. He was 'made post' as a captain on 2 January 1691, and was promoted to rear-admiral on 7 July 1693. He was involved in the Attack on Brest on 18 June 1694. He took a practical interest in the design of warships, and as a ship designer he served as liaison with the Russian Tsar Peter the Great on his visit to London in 1698. He also helped negotiate a proposal of tobacco merchants to ship their products to Russia. In 1699 he designed the Sixth Rate ship Peregrine Galley, which was launched at Sheerness Dockyard in 1700. He became a Vice Admiral of the Red on 8 May 1702 and became a full admiral on 21 December 1708.

== Family ==
On 25 April 1682, he married Bridget Hyde (the only daughter and heiress of Sir Thomas Hyde, 2nd Baronet) and they had four children:

- William Henry Osborne, Viscount Latimer and later Earl of Danby (1690–1711)
- Lord Peregrine Hyde, briefly Earl of Danby, then Marquess of Carmarthen and later 3rd Duke of Leeds (1691–1731)
- Lady Mary Osborne (1688–1722), who married Henry Somerset, 2nd Duke of Beaufort. After his death, she married John Cochrane, 4th Earl of Dundonald
- Lady Bridget Osborne, who married Rev. William Williams, Prebendary of Chichester Cathedral.

Danby inherited his father's titles in 1712 and upon his own death in 1729, was succeeded in them by his second son, Peregrine. His older brother Edward Osborne, Viscount Latimer died without surviving issue. He was buried in the Osborne family chapel at All Hallows Church, Harthill, South Yorkshire.

Parliament of England
Preceded by Edward Grey; Daniel Collingwood	Member of Parliament for Berwick-upon-Tweed; 1677–1679; With: Daniel Collingwood	Succeeded by Ralph Grey; John Rushworth
Preceded by John Tregonwell; Viscount Latimer	Member of Parliament for Corfe Castle; 1679; With: John Tregonwell	Succeeded by John Tregonwell; Sir Nathaniel Napier, Bt
Preceded by Sir John Reresby, Bt; Sir Metcalfe Robinson, Bt	Member of Parliament for York; 1689–1690; With: Edward Thompson	Succeeded by Robert Waller; Henry Thompson
Military offices
Preceded by The Earl of Torrington	Colonel of the 1st Maritime Regiment; 1690–1698	Succeeded by Thomas Brudenell
Honorary titles
Preceded by The Duke of Newcastle-upon-Tyne	Custos Rotulorum of the East Riding of Yorkshire; 1711–1715	Succeeded by The Viscount of Irvine
Vacant Title last held by The Duke of Newcastle-upon-Tyne	Lord Lieutenant of the East Riding of Yorkshire; 1713–1714	Succeeded by The Viscount of Irvine
Peerage of England
Preceded by Thomas Osborne	Duke of Leeds; 1712 – 1729	Succeeded by Peregrine Hyde Osborne
Preceded by Thomas Osborne	Baron Osborne (descended by acceleration); 1690–1713	Succeeded by Peregrine Hyde Osborne
Peerage of Scotland
Preceded by Thomas Osborne	Viscount Osborne (through surrender); 1673 – 1729	Succeeded by Peregrine Hyde Osborne
