= Edward Thompson (of Sheriff Hutton) =

English landowner and politician

Edward Thompson (ca. 1639 – 6 August 1701) was an English landowner and politician.

Edward and his brother Sir Henry Thompson were wine merchants of York; Edward became the principal mover of the business after his brother moved to his new estate at Escrick in 1668. He was a particular friend of Andrew Marvell. During the reign of Charles II, Edward bought the estate of Sheriff Hutton for his own country residence. He was Lord Mayor of York in 1683. He was three times Member of Parliament for York, beginning in 1689.

He married Frances Thompson and had two children: Leonard, who married his second cousin once removed, Frances Thompson of Escrick, and died without issue in 1744, and Richard (d. 1753), twice Lord Mayor of York.

Parliament of England
Preceded by Sir John Reresby, Bt; Sir Metcalfe Robinson, Bt	Member of Parliament for York; 1689–1690; With: Earl of Danby	Succeeded by Robert Waller; Henry Thompson
Preceded by Robert Waller; Henry Thompson	Member of Parliament for York; 1695–1698; With: Tobias Jenkins	Succeeded by Tobias Jenkins; Sir William Robinson, Bt
Preceded by Tobias Jenkins; Sir William Robinson, Bt	Member of Parliament for York; 1701; With: Sir William Robinson, Bt	Succeeded by Sir William Robinson, Bt; Tobias Jenkins
