= Sir Edward Osborne, 1st Baronet =

English politician

Arms of Osborne: Quarterly ermine and azure, a cross or

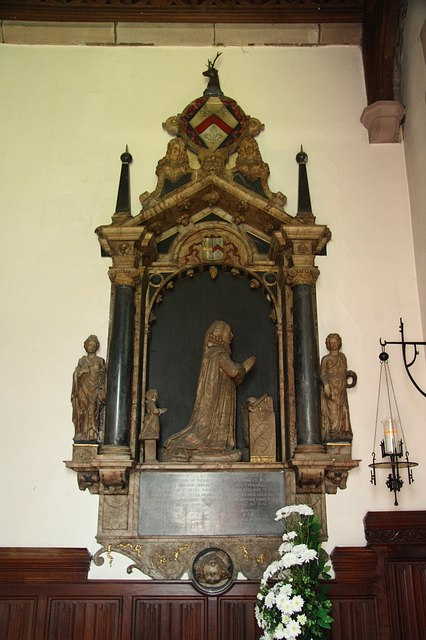
Monument to Lady Margaret Osborne (née Belasyse, died 1624), Sir Edward Osborne's first wife, at Harthill church

Sir Edward Osborne, 1st Baronet, of Kiveton (bap. 12 December 1596 – 9 September 1647) was an English politician who sat in the House of Commons at various times between 1628 and 1640.

Osborne was the son of Sir Hewett Osborne (bap. 13 March 1567 – 1599, brother of Alice Osborne, wife of Sir John Peyton, 1st Baronet) and Joyce Fleetwood. He was made a baronet on 13 July 1620.

In 1628 Osborne was elected Member of Parliament for East Retford. He was elected MP for York in the Short Parliament of 1640 and MP for Berwick in November 1640 for the Long Parliament. When Thomas Wentworth, 1st Earl of Strafford, Lord President of the Council of the North, was sent to Ireland as Lord Lieutenant of Ireland in 1632, he retained the office of Lord President, but appointed Sir Edward as his vice-president. During the political crisis which led to the English Civil War, Sir Edward remained entirely loyal to the Crown, but admitted that he found great difficulty in raising the gentry of Yorkshire to fight for the Royalist cause. In addition, he was deeply distraught by the death of his eldest son, who was killed in 1638 when the roof of the family house fell in; Thomas, his only surviving son, was said to have survived because he was looking for his pet cat under a table at the time of the accident.

Osborne married firstly on 13 October 1618 Margaret Belasyse, who died on 7 November 1624, daughter of Thomas Belasyse, 1st Viscount Fauconberg and Barbara Cholmondeley, by whom he has a son, Edward, who was killed accidentally in 1638, when the roof of the family home fell in. He then secondly married Anne Walmesley, widow of William Middleton, who died in August 1666: she was the daughter of Thomas Walmesley and Eleanor or Elizabeth Danvers (died 1601, sister of Sir Henry Danvers, 1st Earl of Danby). They had an only son who was one of the seven who in their lifetimes came to be celebrated as the Immortal Seven for bringing replacement co-monarchs to James II and VII and who was elevated in the peerage to the highest rank accordingly — Thomas Osborne, 1st Duke of Leeds.

Sir Edward Osborne died in 1647 and was buried in the Osborne family chapel at All Hallows Church, Harthill, South Yorkshire.

== Sources ==
- http://www.geneall.net/U/per_page.php?id=313369

Parliament of England
Preceded by John, Lord Haughton; Sir Francis Wortley	Member of Parliament for East Retford; 1628–1629; With: Henry Stanhope, Lord Stanhope	Parliament suspended until 1640
Vacant Parliament suspended since 1629	Member of Parliament for York; 1640 (April); With: Sir Roger Jaques	Succeeded by Sir William Allanson; Thomas Hoyle
Baronetage of England
New creation	Baronet (of Kiveton); 1620–1647	Succeeded by Thomas Osborne
