= All Saints' Church, Long Marston =

Church in Long Marston, North Yorkshire, England

Coordinates: 53°57′02″N 1°13′54″W

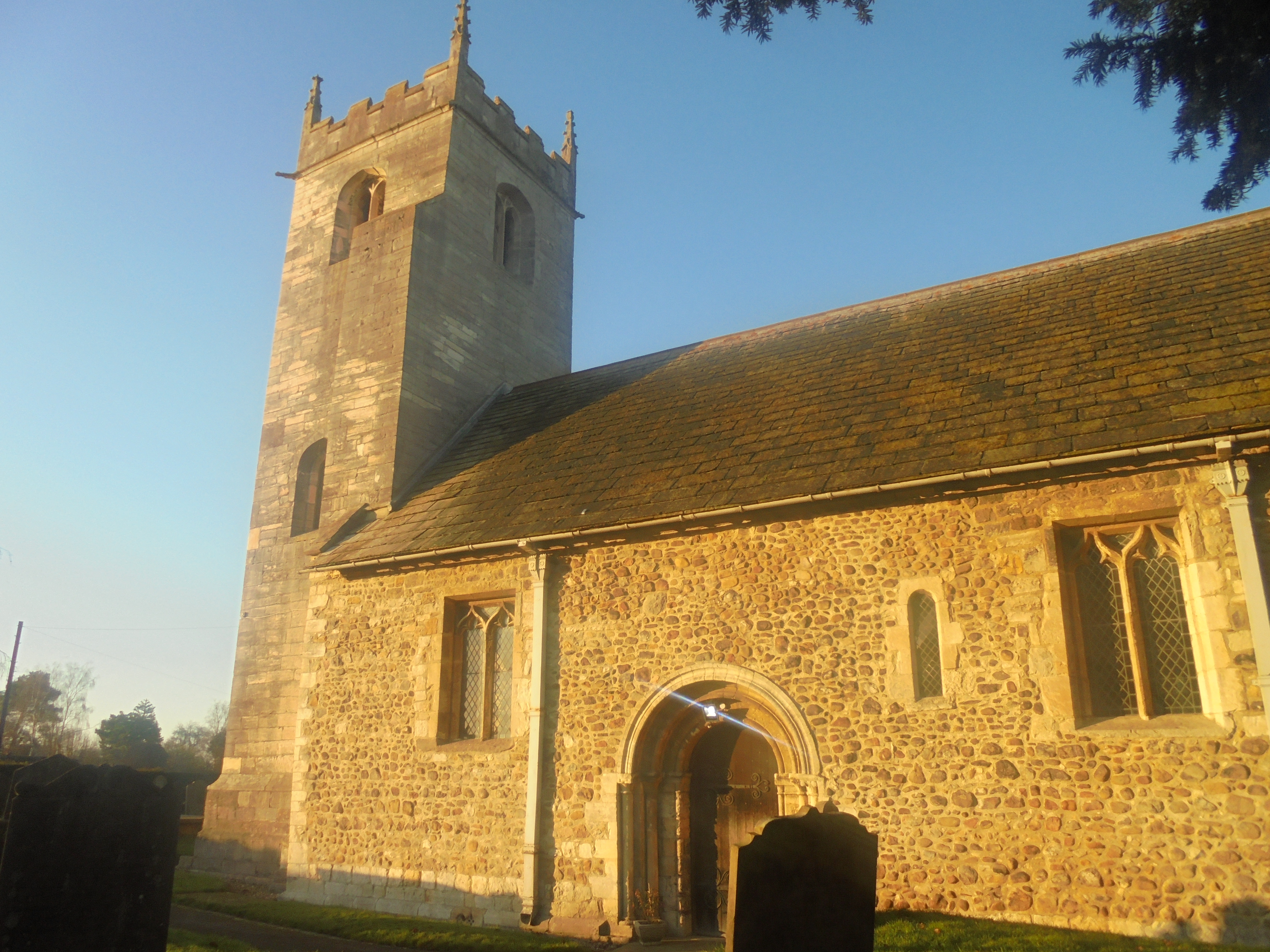
The church, from the south, in 2019

All Saints' Church is the parish church of Long Marston, a village in the county of North Yorkshire, in England.

A chapel was built at the location in the Norman period, but by 1400 both it and the parish church, near Angram, were in ruins. In 1400, permission was granted to build a new church on the site, using materials from the church at Angram. A tower was added in the 15th century. The church was restored in 1810, when new pews were installed, and again restored in 1869. It was Grade I listed in 1966.

From 1598, the rector at the church was Thomas Morton, who later became a bishop. In 1726, Edward Wolfe and Henrietta Thompson were married at the church.

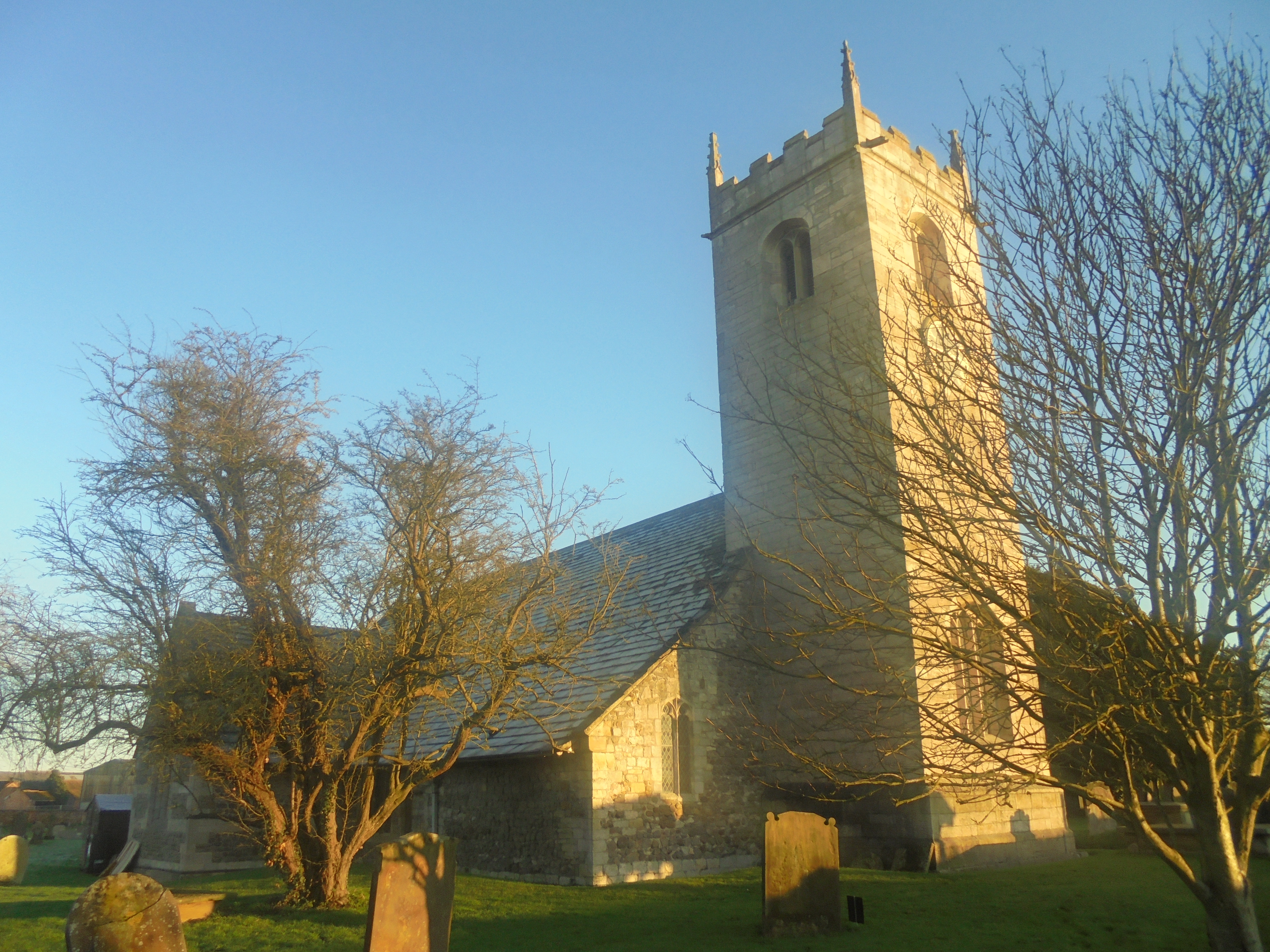
The church, from the north, in 2019

The church is built of cobbles, with a limestone plinth and quoins. The nave is of four bays, with a north aisle and a transept chapel, which was added in 1869, while the chancel is of two bays. The tower is at the west end, including the west window and supporting a clock and decoration including gargoyles. The main entrance is in the south wall and is through a reused 12th-century doorway, and there are also two early round-headed windows in the chancel. Most of the other windows are in the Perpendicular style, while the east window was designed in 1880 by Hardman & Co.

Inside the church, there is a monument of 1602 to Jacob Thwaites, and a stone block with a hollow which was formerly either a cross base or a font. The pulpit and altar date from the late 19th century.

== See also ==
- Grade I listed buildings in North Yorkshire (district)
- Listed buildings in Long Marston, North Yorkshire
