= Sir William Milner, 1st Baronet =

British politician

Sir William Milner, 1st Baronet (c.1696–1745) of Nun Appleton, Yorkshire, was a British politician who sat in the House of Commons from 1722 to 1734.

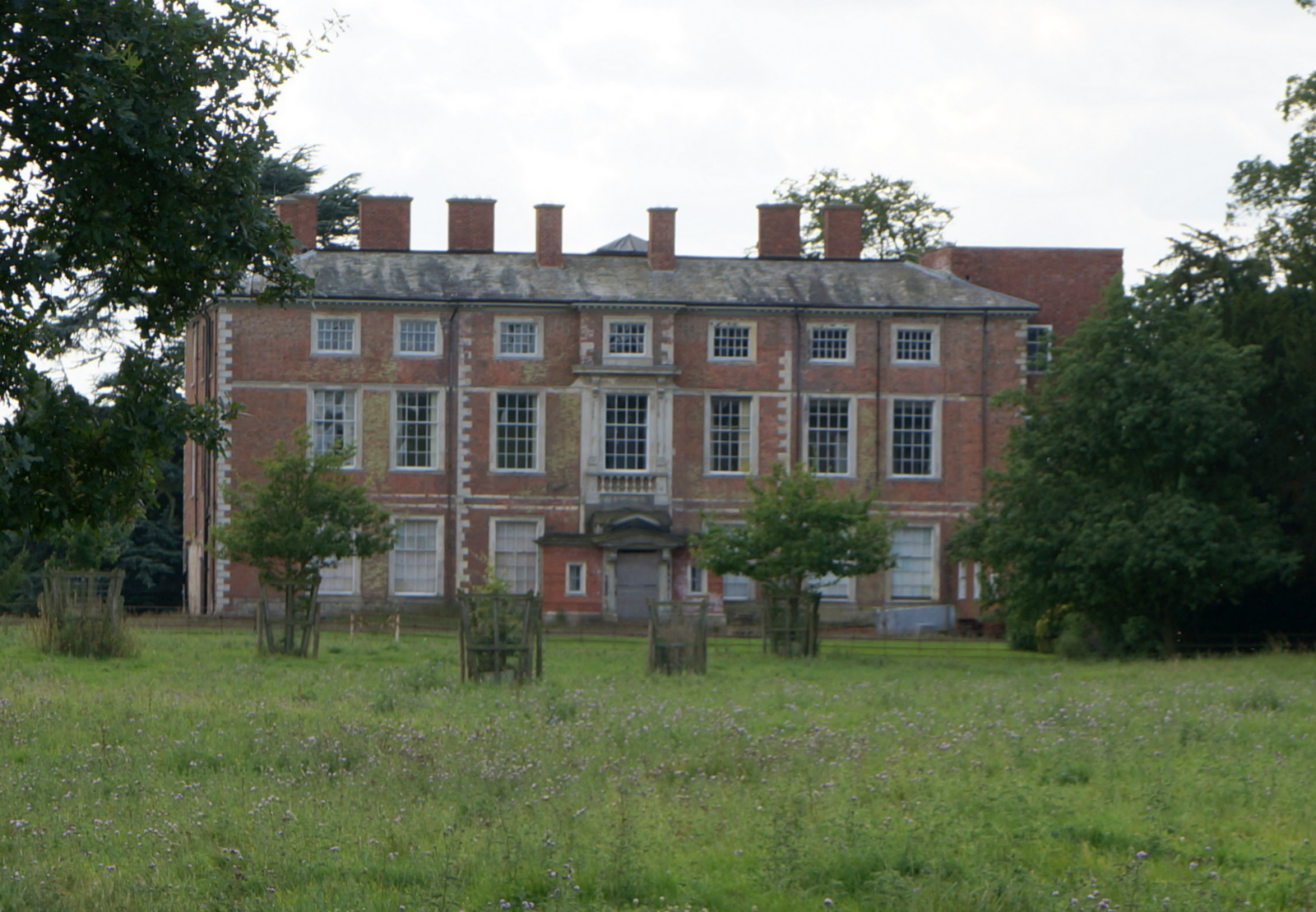
Nun Appleton Hall

Milner was the eldest son of William Milner of Nun Appleton, and his wife Mary Ibbetson, daughter of Joshua Ibbetson, mayor of Leeds. His father was a Leeds clothing merchant and alderman and mayor of Leeds, Milner was educated at Eton College and was admitted at Jesus College, Cambridge and at Middle Temple in 1713.

He was married on 5 December 1716 to Elizabeth Dawes (d. 1782), daughter of Sir William Dawes, 3rd Baronet, who was Archbishop of York from 1714 to 1724. He was created a baronet on 26 February 1717.

Milner was elected at the 1722 general election as Tory Member of Parliament for York on the interest of his father-in-law, the archbishop, who wanted to make it ‘a church borough’. In 1725, he voted against the restoration of Bolingbroke's estates. He was returned unopposed at the 1727 general election, and crossed the floor to the Government side. He voted with the government on most occasions, but voted against them on the civil list arrears in 1729, and the Excise Bill in 1733. He spoke on 9 February 1732 to complain of a clergyman who claimed publicly that he received pension of £500 a year, and asserted that he would never accept a place or pension while he was a Member of Parliament so that he could keep an unbiased opinion. He stood again at the 1734 general election, but withdrew before the poll and was defeated at the 1741 general election.

Milner was Grand Master of the English Freemasons in 1728. He died in the parish of St George, Hanover Square on 23 November 1745, his wife died in 1782. He and his wife had a son and daughter. His daughter was Mary Milner (1740-1799) who married Sir John Lindsay in 1768 but had no issue. His son Sir William Milner, 2nd Baronet (1725–1774) succeeded to the baronetcy and was Receiver-General of Excise and High Sheriff of Yorkshire.

Parliament of Great Britain
Preceded by Sir William Robinson; Tobias Jenkins	Member of Parliament for York; 1722–1734; With: Edward Thompson	Succeeded by Sir John Lister Kaye; Edward Thompson
Baronetage of Great Britain
New creation	Baronet (of Nun Appleton Hall); 1717-1745	Succeeded by William Milner
