= Sir William Robinson, 1st Baronet =

English politician

Arms of Robinson of Newby: Vert, a chevron between three bucks at gaze or

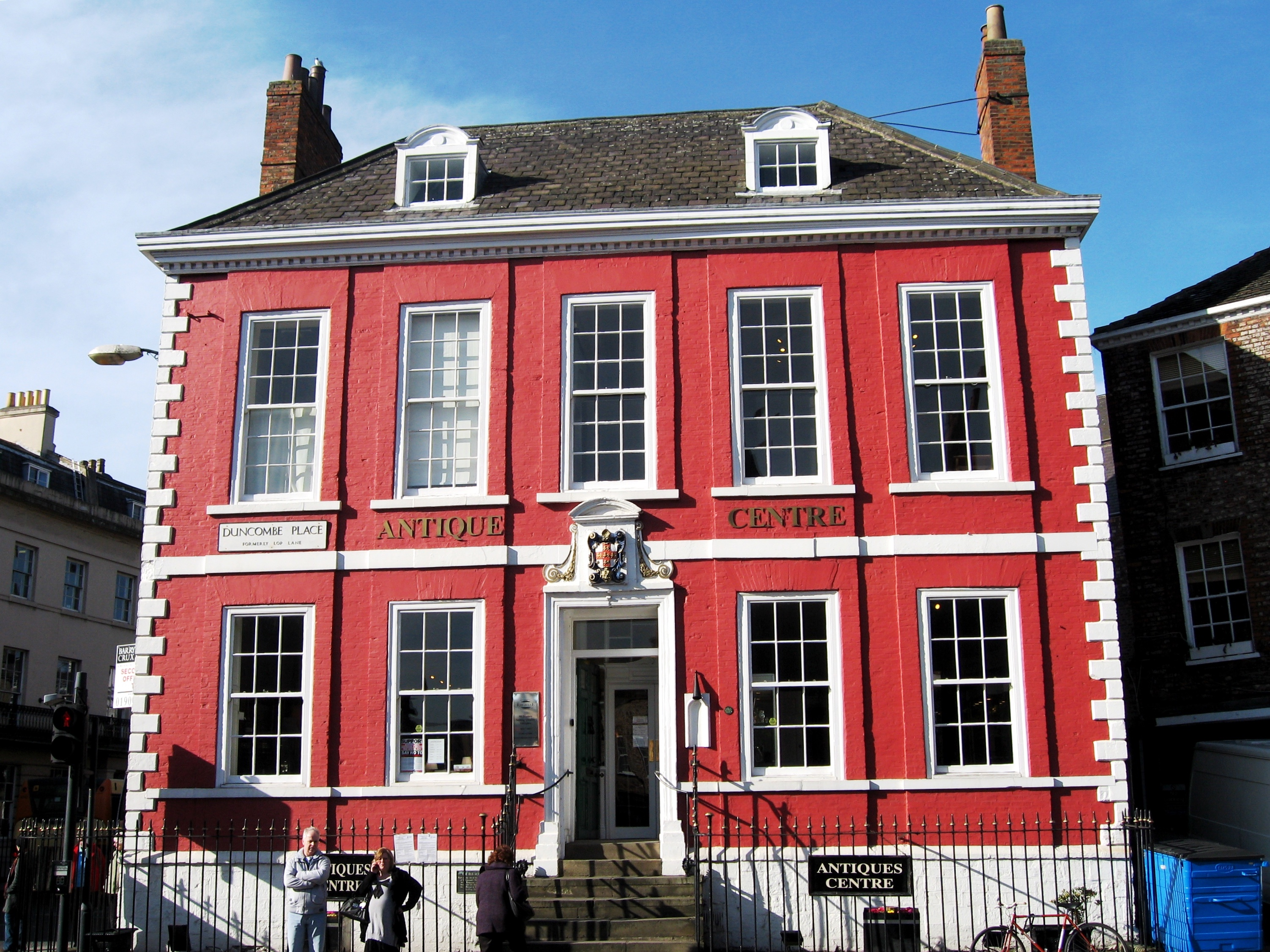
The Red House, built for Robinson c. 1714 with later additions.

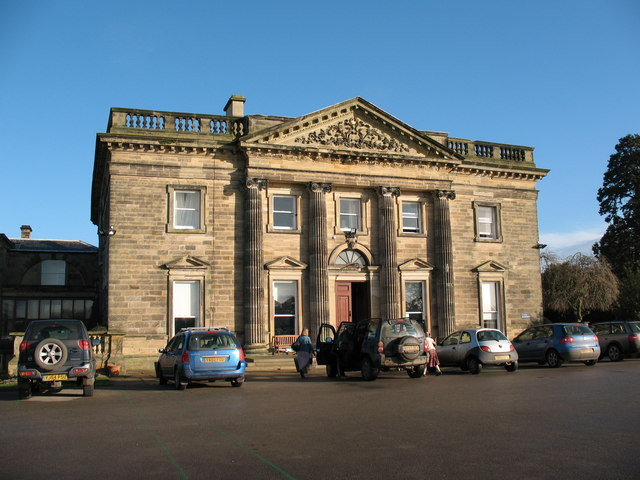
Newby Park, later Baldersby Park

Sir William Robinson, 1st Baronet (19 November 1655 – 22 December 1736), 1st Baronet of Newby-on-Swale, Yorkshire, was an English Whig politician who sat in the English and British House of Commons between 1689 and 1722. He was Lord Mayor of York from 1700 to 1701.

Robinson was the eldest son of Thomas Robinson of York, a Turkey merchant, by his wife Elizabeth, Tancred, daughter of Charles Tancred of Arden, Yorkshire. He was descended from a wealthy York merchant, also called William Robinson, who had been Lord Mayor of York and its MP during the reign of Elizabeth I. Robinson was educated at York under Mr Langley, and was admitted at St John's College, Cambridge on 6 February 1671. In 1674, he was admitted at Gray's Inn. He succeeded his father in 1676. He married Mary Aislabie, daughter of George Aislabie of Studley Royal, Yorkshire on 8 September 1679. He was Captain of the Bulmer Troop, North Riding Militia Horse, from December 1688 and was associated with Danby's rising during the Glorious Revolution.

Robinson was returned as Member of Parliament for Northallerton on his own interest at the 1689 English general election. He was not very active in parliament and was appointed to only three committees. He was High Sheriff of Yorkshire in from March to November 1689. His uncle Metcalfe Robinson had been created a baronet in 1660, but died without issue in 1689, so that the baronetcy became extinct. Robinson was created a baronet to revive the title on 13 February 1690.

Robinson was returned as MP for Northallerton at the 1690 English general election. He was MP for York from 1698 until 1722. He was also Lord Mayor of York in 1700. In the city, he lived at The Red House, which he built in 1714.

He commissioned Colen Campbell to build Newby Park house (later known as Baldersby Park House) in the new Palladian style at Newby-on-Swale. It was completed in 1721 and is now a Grade I listed building.

Robinson died on 22 December 1736 and was buried at Topcliffe. He had five sons and one daughter. His eldest son, Metcalfe, survived him by only four days, the baronetcy then passed to his second son, Tancred, who became a Rear-Admiral of the White and was twice Lord Mayor of York. His fourth son, Thomas served as Secretary of State for the Southern Department and Leader of the House of Commons, and was raised to the peerage as Baron Grantham in 1761.

Parliament of England
Preceded by Sir David Foulis; Sir Henry Marwood	Member of Parliament for Northallerton; 1689–1695; With: Thomas Lascelles	Succeeded by Thomas Lascelles; Sir William Hustler
Preceded by Tobias Jenkins; Edward Thompson	Member of Parliament for York; 1698–1707; With: Tobias Jenkins 1698–1701; Edward Thompson 1701; Tobias Jenkins 1701–1705; Robert Benson 1705–07	Succeeded by Parliament of Great Britain
Parliament of Great Britain
Preceded by Parliament of England	Member of Parliament for York; 1708–1722; With: Robert Benson 1708–1713; Robert Fairfax 1713–15; Tobias Jenkins 1715–1722	Succeeded by Sir William Milner; Edward Thompson Jr
Baronetage of England
New creation	Baronet (of Newby); 1690–1736	Succeeded by Metcalfe Robinson
