= Thomas Brudenell (British Army officer, died 1707) =

British Army general

Major-General Thomas Brudenell (died 1707) was a British Army officer.

He was the eldest son of Richard Brudenell by his wife Elizabeth, daughter of Sir Walter Lyttelton.

In 1688 he was a captain in the Earl of Pembroke's Regiment of Foot, an English regiment in the Dutch service. He became lieutenant-colonel of Colonel John Foulkes' Regiment of Foot on 21 September 1689, and lieutenant-colonel of Colonel Edward Lloyd's Regiment of Foot on 1 October 1692. He succeeded Henry Rowe as colonel of a regiment of foot on 13 March 1695. He was wounded at the Battle of the Boyne and served in Portugal. In 1698 he was appointed colonel of a 1st Maritime Regiment of marines, which was disbanded shortly afterwards. On 21 June 1701 he was made colonel of a regiment of foot to be employed in Ireland. He was promoted to major-general on 1 June 1706 and died at Gibraltar the following year.

He was the father of Lieutenant-General Thomas Brudenell and of Catherine Brudenell, who married Thomas Chichester Phillips and was the mother of Major-General William Phillips.

Military offices
Preceded by Marquess of Carmarthen	Colonel of the 1st Maritime Regiment; 1698–1699	Disbanded
