= Long Marston Hall =

Building in Long Marston, North Yorkshire, England

Coordinates: 53°57′20″N 1°14′17″W

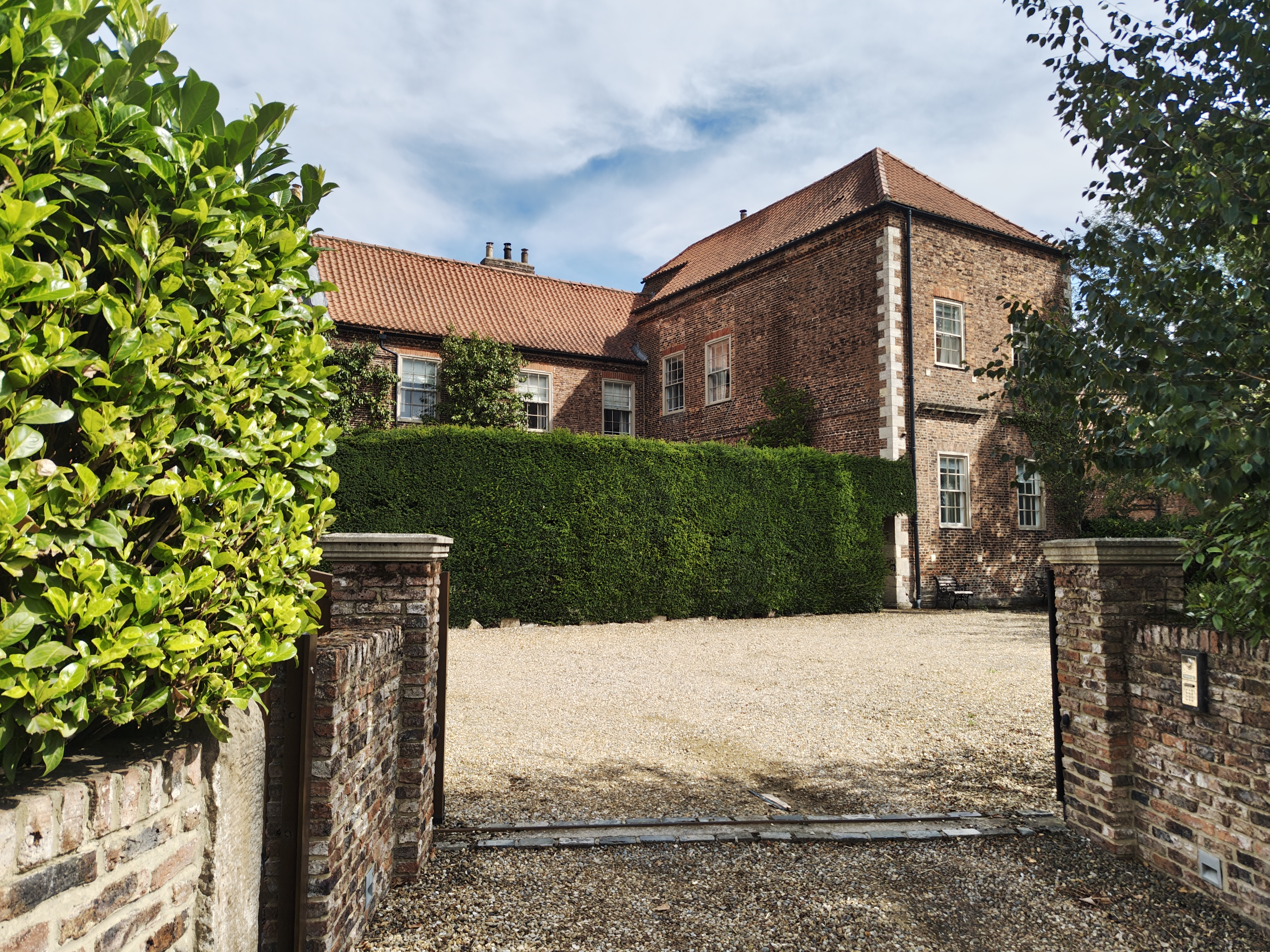
The hall, in 2025

Long Marston Hall is a historic building in Long Marston, North Yorkshire, a village in England.

An earlier manor house on the site was owned by the Thwaite family, and it was used by Oliver Cromwell as his headquarters during the Battle of Marston Moor. In the 1680s, it was sold to the Thompson family, and they demolished the property and built a new house, with a U-shaped plan. Edward Thompson divided the house in two. Later in the 18th century, the central section of the building was demolished. The north section was extended, probably to provide warehousing space for a wine merchant business. This range retained the name of the hall, while the south section became known as the Old Granary. The house was grade II* listed in 1952.

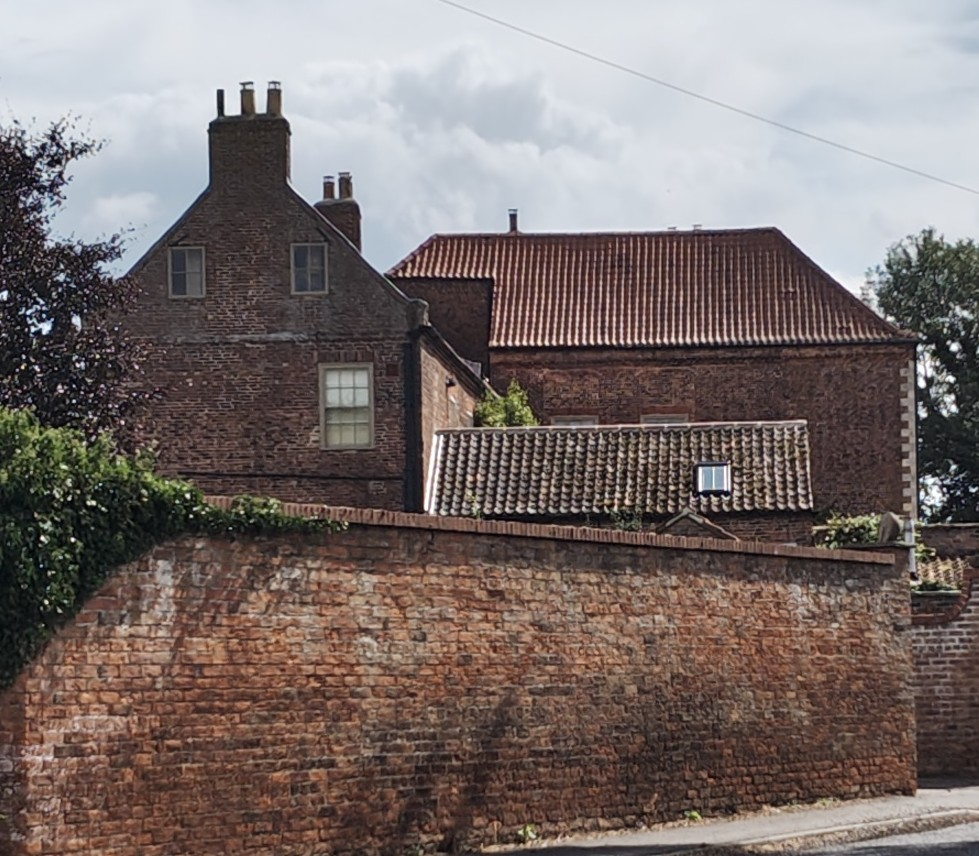
The house, seen from the north

The house is built of red brick with quoins and a hipped pantile roof. It has two storeys and attics, and an L-shaped plan, with a three-bay entrance range, a projecting two-bay wing and a three-bay block at the rear. The doorway in the entrance range has a fanlight, and the windows are sashes in architraves, with slightly cambered stretcher arches. Inside, there is a high quality staircase from about 1700 rising from the ground floor to the attic, and early doors, panelling, partitions and fireplaces. The block at the rear has a brick-vaulted cellar with a barrel ramp and a large drain.

== See also ==
- Grade II* listed buildings in North Yorkshire (district)
- Listed buildings in Long Marston, North Yorkshire
