= Roger Jaques =

Sir Roger Jaques (died 1653) was an English merchant and politician who sat in the House of Commons in 1640.

Jaques was a merchant and chief magistrate of York and purchased an estate at Elvington. He became an alderman of the city in 1638 and was Lord Mayor of York in 1639. He was knighted, together with Thomas Widdrington on the visit of King Charles to York in March 1639.

In April 1640, Jaques was elected Member of Parliament for York in the Short Parliament.

Jaques supported the King in the Civil War, and in December 1644 was removed by parliament from the office of Alderman of York.

Jaques married Mary Rawdon, daughter of Marmaduke Rawdon. Their granddaughter Mary married Simon Sterne, grandfather of the humourist Laurence Sterne.

Parliament of England
Vacant Parliament suspended since 1629	Member of Parliament for York; 1640; With: Sir Edward Osborne, 1st Baronet	Succeeded by Sir William Allanson; Thomas Hoyle
