= Long Marston, North Yorkshire =

Village and civil parish in North Yorkshire, England

Coordinates: 53°57′14″N 1°14′13″W

Long Marston
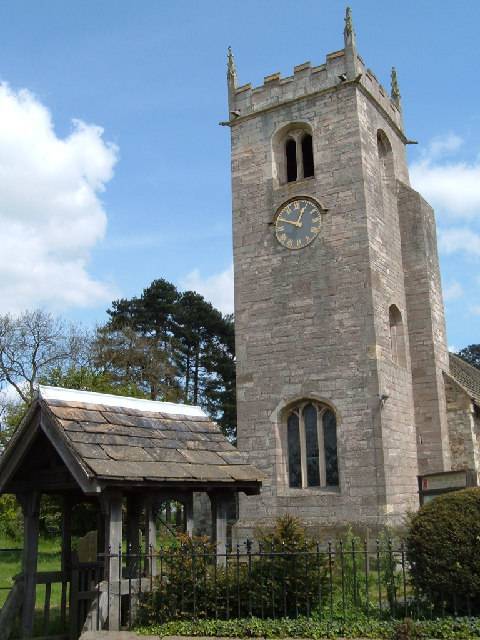
- All Saints' Church

- Location within North Yorkshire
- Population: 635 (Including Birdforth. 2011 census)
- OS grid reference: SE501511
- Civil parish: Long Marston
- Unitary authority: North Yorkshire
- Ceremonial county: North Yorkshire
- Region: Yorkshire and the Humber
- Country: England
- Sovereign state: United Kingdom
- Post town: YORK
- Postcode district: YO26
- Dialling code: 01904
- Police: North Yorkshire
- Fire: North Yorkshire
- Ambulance: Yorkshire
- UK Parliament: Wetherby and Easingwold

Long Marston is a village and civil parish in the county of North Yorkshire, England. Historically part of the West Riding of Yorkshire, it is situated on the B1224 road from Wetherby to York, 7 miles (11 km) west of York. The civil parish includes the hamlets of Hutton Wandesley, immediately south of the village of Long Marston, and Angram, 1.5 miles (2.4 km) south east of Hutton Wandesley.

== History ==
The Battle of Marston Moor was fought just west of the village. There is a monument to the battle on the Tockwith Road to the north of the village.

The village's manor house served as Oliver Cromwell's headquarters during the battle. Following rebuilding, it is now Long Marston Hall.

== Amenities ==
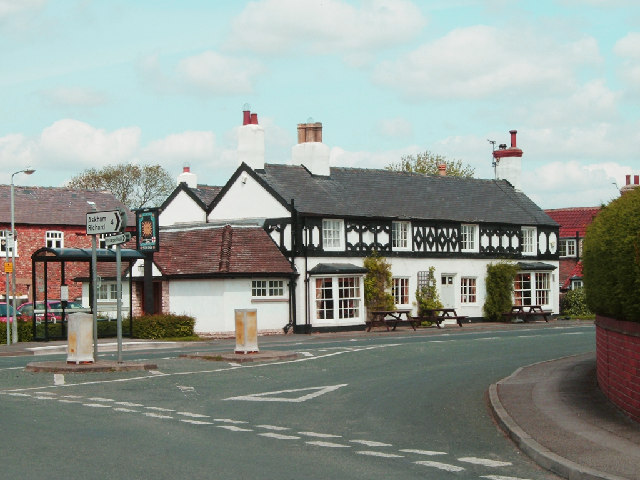
The Sun Inn

The village has the Anglican All Saints' Church, a junior school and a public house, the Sun Inn. The inn is owned and operated by Samuel Smith Old Brewery, but has been closed since 2021. The former rectory is now Long Marston Manor.

Until 2008 it had a Wesleyan Methodist chapel which closed due to dwindling attendances. In 2011 the chapel was demolished, and a private house built on the site.

The village has a Village Hall located off Butt Hedge on Angram Road. The playing fields are home to the two cricket teams which compete in the Wetherby Cricket league.

The Old Post Office and Lodore, on Angram Road, are Grade II listed buildings.

== Governance and transport ==
Long Marston falls in the electoral ward of Marston Moor. This ward stretches north to Tockwith and has a total population taken at the 2011 census of 2,888.

From 1974 to 2023 it was part of the Borough of Harrogate, it is now administered by the unitary North Yorkshire Council.

The B1224 road cuts through the village, running approximately east-to-west. The village crossroads, the location of the Sun Inn, is the main junction of the B1224 with Tockwith Road, which heads north, and Angram Road, which heads south. There are bus services to Wetherby and York.

The nearest railway stations are at Hammerton (3.3 miles (5.3 km)) and Poppleton (3.7 miles (6.0 km)).

== Hutton Wandesley ==
The small hamlet of Hutton Wandesley is directly adjacent to the village and forms part of the civil parish of Long Marston. Hutton Wandesley was historically a township in the ancient parish of Long Marston. It became a separate civil parish in 1866. In 1988 the parish was absorbed into the civil parish of Long Marston.

== Notable residents ==
- Sir Henry Thompson, Lord Mayor of York (1663 & 1672), Deputy Lieutenant of the West Riding of Yorkshire (1665) and MP for York (1673–1873) died in Long Marston.

== See also ==
- Listed buildings in Long Marston, North Yorkshire
