= Hewett Osborne =

English landowner and soldier

Sir Hewett Osborne (1567–1599) was an English landowner and soldier who served in Ireland in the late sixteenth century. He owned lands at Kiveton in Yorkshire and neighbouring Wales, South Yorkshire, but lived in Essex.

== Early life and marriage ==
He was the son of Edward Osborne, a Lord Mayor of London and Anne, the daughter of prominent merchant Sir William Hewett who had been elected for a standard spell as Lord Mayor of London.

He married Joyce Fleetwood, daughter of Thomas Fleetwood, one of the few successive Masters of the Mint under Henry VIII and his second wife Bridget Spring.

== Career ==
He studied law at the Inner Temple, then in 1590 enlisted for military service as a volunteer in Lord Willoughby's expedition to France to assist Henry IV. He later took part in the successful raid on and temporary capture of Cádiz in 1596.

He accompanied the Earl of Essex in his Campaign in Ireland during Tyrone's Rebellion. Essex had him knighted for his services at Maynooth but he died the same year in a skirmish with the rebels.

== Descendants ==
He was succeeded by his son Sir Edward Osborne, 1st Baronet whose eldest son became Duke of Leeds, a leading figure in the early Tory Party in the reign of Charles II and one of the Immortal Seven for his invitation to William and Mary to overthrow his exiled ruling brother (James II and VII).

His only daughter Alice married Christopher Wandesford, Lord Deputy of Ireland, with whom her children included Sir Christopher Wandesford, 1st Baronet and the writer Alice Thornton.

== Bibliography ==
- Waters, Robert Edmond Chester. Genealogical memoirs of the extinct family of Chester of Chicheley. Volume I.
