= Reresby baronets =

Baronetage of England

- Escutcheon of the Reresby baronets of Thribergh
- Creation date: 1642
- Status: extinct
- Extinction date: 1748

The Reresby Baronetcy, of Thribergh in the County of York, was a title in the Baronetage of England. It was created on 16 May 1642 for John Reresby. The second Baronet was a politician and diarist. The title became extinct on the death of the fourth Baronet in 1748.

== Reresby baronets, of Thribergh (1642) ==
- Sir John Reresby, 1st Baronet (1611–1646)
- Sir John Reresby, 2nd Baronet (1634–1689)
- Sir William Reresby, 3rd Baronet (1669–c. 1735)
- Sir Leonard Reresby, 4th Baronet (1679–1748)
