= Thomas Hoyle =

Thomas Hoyle (29 January 1586 – 30 January 1650), sometimes spelt Hoile, was mayor of York and member of parliament during the English Civil War.

Hoyle was son of Thomas Hoyle of Slaithwaite, Yorkshire, England.

In 1628, the two parliamentary seats for York were initially awarded to Sir Thomas Savile and Arthur Ingram. However, because of election irregularities, the Commons’ committee for privileges overturned the appointment of Savile in favour of Hoyle, who then served as member of parliament for York.

Hoyle was elected lord mayor of York in 1632.

Elected again to Parliament in November 1640, Hoyle represented York in the Long Parliament.

Hoyle sided with Parliament in the English Civil War. After taking York from the Royalists in 1644, Parliament appointed Hoyle to resume duty as Mayor of York.

Despite speaking against and entering his dissent in the debate upon the King's Answers constituting a ground for peace, Hoyle was not excluded under Pride's Purge, and continued as an MP in the Rump Parliament.

On the first anniversary of the execution of King Charles I, that is 30 January 1650, Hoyle killed himself.

Hoyle married firstly the daughter of William Maskew, named Elizabeth, who died 9 December 1639. He married secondly to Susannah of unknown parentage.

Parliament of England
Preceded by Arthur Ingram; Christopher Brooke	Member of Parliament for York; 1628–1629; With: Arthur Ingram	Succeeded by Sir Edward Osborne, 1st Baronet; Roger Jaques
Preceded by Sir Edward Osborne, 1st Baronet; Roger Jaques	Member of Parliament for York; 1640–1648; With: Arthur Ingram	Succeeded by Barebone's Parliament did not have a seat for York
