= Thomas Osborne, 1st Duke of Leeds =

English statesman

His Grace The Duke of Leeds KG
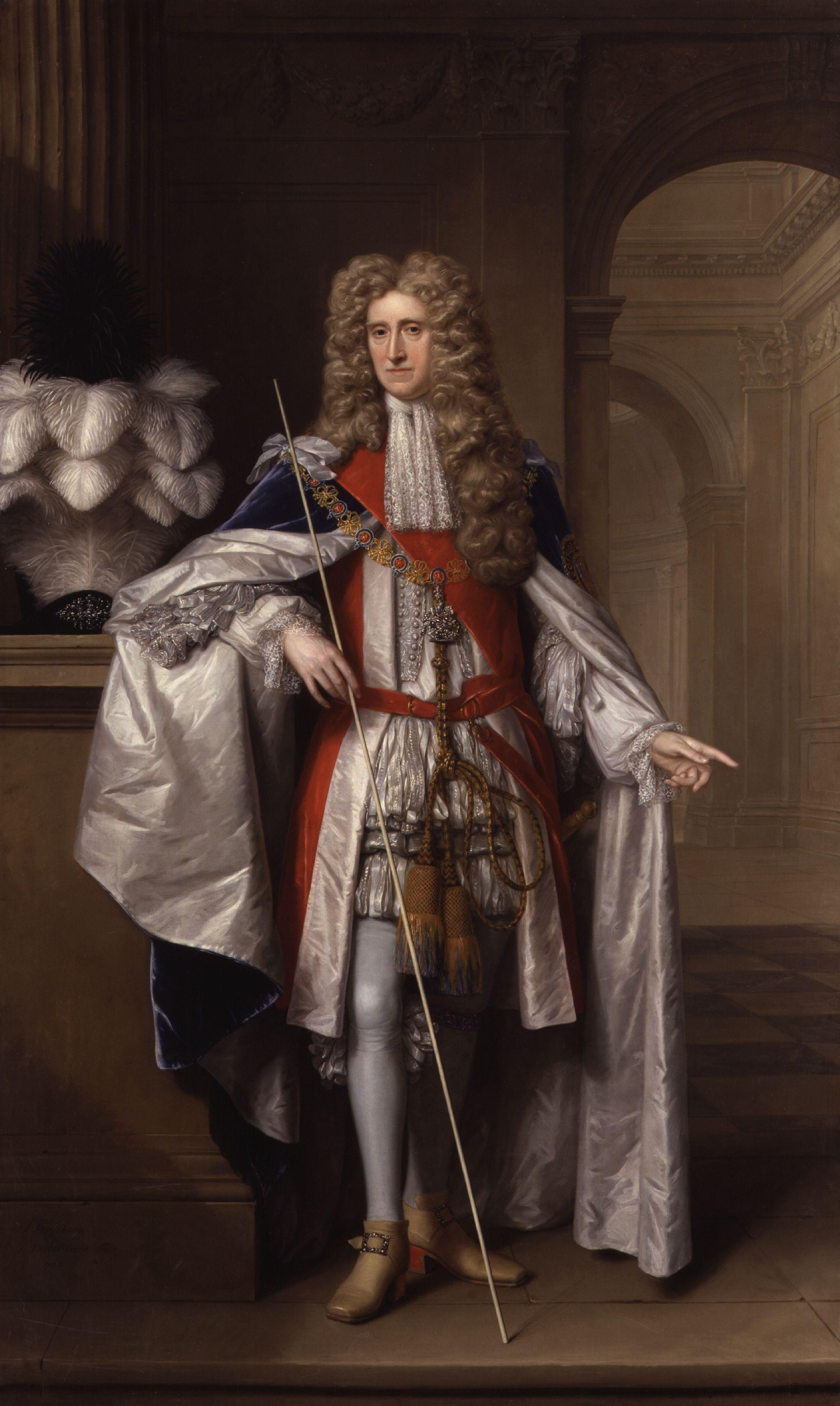
- Portrait by Johann Kerseboom, c. 1704

Treasurer of the Navy
- In office 1668–1673
- Monarch: Charles II
- Preceded by: The Earl of Anglesey
- Succeeded by: Edward Seymour

Chief Minister of Great Britain Lord High Treasurer
- In office 24 June 1673 – 26 March 1679
- Monarch: Charles II
- Preceded by: The Lord Clifford of Chudleigh
- Succeeded by: The Earl of Essex

Lord President of the Council
- In office 14 February 1689 – 18 May 1699
- Monarchs: William III and Mary II
- Preceded by: The Viscount Preston
- Succeeded by: The Earl of Pembroke and Montgomery

Personal details
- Born: 20 February 1632
- Died: 26 July 1712 (aged 80) Easton Neston, Northamptonshire
- Resting place: Osborne Family Chapel, All Hallows' Church
- Spouse: Lady Bridget Bertie (m. 1651)
- Children: 9, including Edward and Peregrine
- Parent: Sir Edward Osborne, 1st Baronet (father)

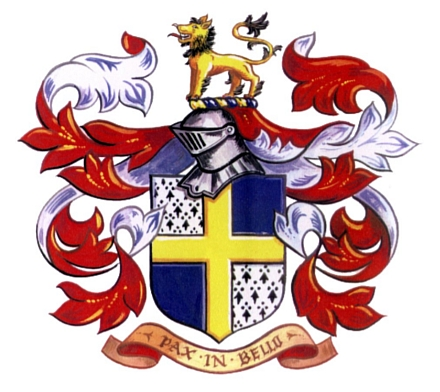
Osborne's coat of arms

Thomas Osborne, 1st Duke of Leeds, KG (20 February 1632 – 26 July 1712) was an English Tory statesman. During the reign of Charles II of England, he was the leading figure in the English government for roughly five years in the mid-1670s. Osborne fell out of favour due to corruption and other scandals. He was impeached and eventually imprisoned in the Tower of London for five years until James II of England acceded in 1685. In 1688, he was one of the Immortal Seven who invited William of Orange to depose James II during the Glorious Revolution. Osborne was again the leading figure in England's government for a few years in the early 1690s before dying in 1712.

== Early life, 1632–1674 ==
Osborne was the son of Sir Edward Osborne, Baronet of Kiveton, Yorkshire, and his second wife Anne Walmesley, widow of Thomas Middleton; she was a niece of Henry Danvers, 1st Earl of Danby. Thomas Osborne was born in 1632. He was the grandson of Sir Hewett Osborne and great-grandson of Sir Edward Osborne, Lord Mayor of London, who, according to the accepted account, while an apprentice to Sir William Hewett, clothworker and lord mayor in 1559, made the fortunes of the family by leaping from London Bridge into the river and rescuing Anne (d. 1585), the daughter of his employer, whom he afterwards married.

Osborne's father was a staunch Royalist who served as Vice President of the Council of the North. Thomas's elder half-brother Edward was killed in an accident in 1638, when the family home roof collapsed on him; according to a family legend, Thomas survived because he had been searching for his cat under a table at the time of the disaster. Their father, a loving parent, is said never to have fully recovered from the loss.

Osborne, the future Lord Treasurer, succeeded to the baronetcy and estates in Yorkshire on his father Edward's death in 1647, and, after unsuccessfully courting his cousin Dorothy Osborne, married Lady Bridget, daughter of Montagu Bertie, 2nd Earl of Lindsey, in 1651.

=== Introduction to public life, 1665–1674 ===
Osborne was introduced to public life and court by his neighbour in Yorkshire, George Villiers, 2nd Duke of Buckingham. In 1661 he was appointed High Sheriff of Yorkshire and was then elected MP for York in 1665. He made the "first step in his future rise" by joining Buckingham in his attack on the Earl of Clarendon in 1667. In 1668 he was appointed joint Treasurer of the Navy with Sir Thomas Lyttelton, and subsequently sole treasurer. He succeeded Sir William Coventry as commissioner for the state treasury in 1669, and in 1673 was appointed a commissioner for the admiralty. He was created Viscount Osborne in the Scottish peerage on 2 February 1673, and a privy councillor on 3 May. On 19 June, on the resignation of Lord Clifford, he was appointed lord treasurer and made Baron Osborne of Kiveton and Viscount Latimer in the peerage of England, while on 27 June 1674 he was created Earl of Danby, by Charles II when he surrendered his Scottish peerage of Osborne to his third son Peregrine Osborne; (he was on his mother's side a great-nephew of the previous Earl of Danby). He was appointed the same year lord-lieutenant of the West Riding of Yorkshire, and in 1677 received the Garter.

== Leading the King's government, 1674–1678 ==
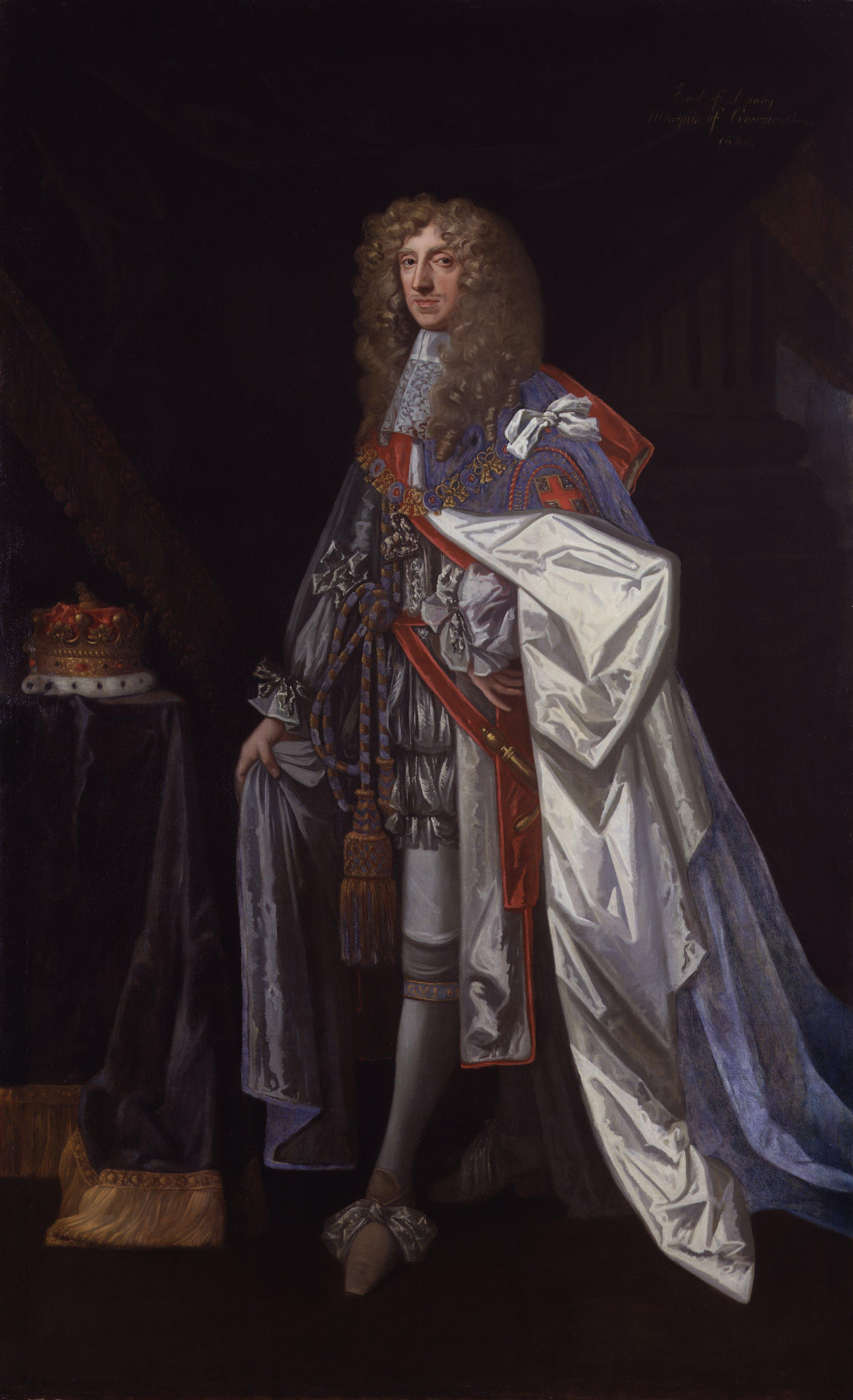
Thomas Osborne, Lord Danby, painted in Charles II's reign by Peter Lely (1618–1680)

Danby was a statesman of very different calibre from the leaders of the Cabal Ministry, Buckingham and Arlington. His principal aim was no doubt the maintenance and increase of his own influence and party, but his ambition corresponded with definite political views. A member of the old Cavalier party, a confidential friend and correspondent of Lauderdale, he desired to strengthen the executive and the royal authority. At the same time, he was a keen partisan of the established church, an enemy of both Catholics and dissenters, and an opponent of all toleration. He is often credited with inventing "Parliamentary management", the first conscious effort to convert a mass of country backbenchers into an organised Government lobby. While he made full use of patronage for this purpose, he undoubtedly regarded patronage as an essential tool of Royal policy; as he wrote in 1677 "nothing is more necessary than for the world to see that he (the King) will reward and punish".

=== Politics of religion ===
In 1673 Osborne opposed Charles II's Royal Declaration of Indulgence, supported the Test Act, and spoke against the proposal for giving relief to the dissenters. In June 1675 he signed the paper of advice drawn up by the bishops for the king, urging the rigid enforcement of the laws against Catholics, their complete banishment from the court, and the suppression of conventicles. A bill introduced by him imposing special taxes on recusants and subjecting Catholic priests to imprisonment for life was only thrown out as too lenient because it secured offenders from the charge of treason. The same year he introduced a Test Oath by which all holding office or seats in either House of Parliament were to declare resistance to the royal power a crime, and promise to abstain from all attempts to alter the government of either church or state; but this extreme measure of retrograde toryism was rejected. The king opposed and also doubted the wisdom and practicability of this thorough policy of repression. Danby, therefore, ordered a return from every diocese of the numbers of dissenters, both Catholic and Protestant, in order to prove their insignificance, in order to remove the royal scruples (this became known as the Compton Census). In December 1676 he issued a proclamation for the suppression of coffee-houses because of the "defamation of His Majesty's Government" which took place in them, but this was soon withdrawn. In 1677, to secure Protestantism in case of a Catholic succession, he introduced a bill by which ecclesiastical patronage and the care of the royal children were entrusted to the bishops; but this measure, like the other, was thrown out.

=== Foreign affairs ===
In foreign affairs, Danby showed a stronger grasp of essentials. He desired to increase English trade, credit and power abroad. He was a determined enemy both to Catholic influence and to French ascendancy. As he wrote in a memorandum in the summer of 1677, an English Minister must consider only how England's interests stand, and all considerations including trade, religion, and public opinion pointed to the Dutch Republic, not France, as the desired ally. He terminated the war with the Dutch Republic in 1674, and from that time maintained a friendly correspondence with William of Orange. In 1677, after two years of tedious negotiations, he overcame all obstacles, and in spite of James's opposition, and without the knowledge of Louis XIV, effected the marriage between William and Mary that was the germ of the Revolution and the Act of Settlement.

This national policy, however, could only be pursued, and the minister could only maintain himself in power, by acquiescence in the king's personal relations with the king of France settled by the Treaty of Dover in 1670, which included Charles's acceptance of a pension, and bound him to a policy exactly opposite to Danby's, one furthering French and Catholic ascendancy. Though not a member of the Cabal ministry, and in spite of his own denial, Danby must, it would seem, have known of the relations between King Charles and King Louis after becoming Lord Treasurer. In any case, in 1676, together with Lauderdale alone, he consented to a treaty between Charles and Louis according to which the foreign policy of both kings was to be conducted in union, and Charles received an annual subsidy of £100,000. In 1678 Charles, taking advantage of the growing hostility to France in the nation and parliament, raised his price, and Danby by his directions demanded through Ralph Montagu (afterwards Duke of Montagu) six million livres a year (£300,000) for three years.

Simultaneously with negotiating the royal policy of an Anglo-French alliance, Danby guided through parliament a bill for raising money for a war against France; a league was concluded with the Dutch Republic, and troops were actually sent there. That Danby, in spite of his compromising transactions on the King's behalf, remained in intention faithful to a pro-Dutch and anti-French policy, appears clear from the hostility with which he was still regarded by France. In 1676, Ruvigny described Danby to Louis XIV as intensely antagonistic to France and French interests, and as doing his utmost to prevent the treaty of that year. In 1678, on the rupture of relations between Charles and Louis, a splendid opportunity of paying off old scores was afforded Louis by disclosing Danby's participation in Charles's demands for French gold.

== Fall from grace, 1678–1688 ==
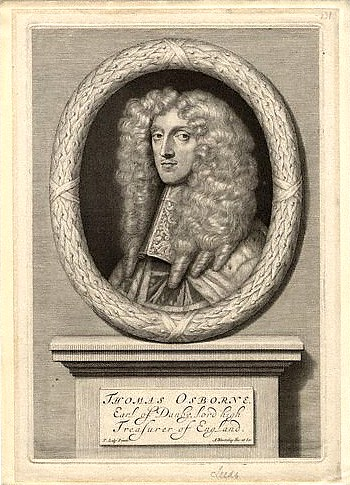
Thomas Osborne, after Peter Lely, depicted as Lord High Treasurer of England

The circumstances of Danby's acts (and King Charles's) now came together to bring about his fall. Although both abroad and at home his policy had generally embodied the wishes of the ascendant party, Danby had never obtained the confidence of the nation. His character inspired no respect, and during the whole of his long career, he could not rely on the support of a single individual. Charles is said to have told him when he made him treasurer that he had only two friends in the world, himself and his own merit. He was described to Samuel Pepys as "one of a broken sort of people that have not much to lose and therefore will venture all", and as "a beggar having £1100 or £1200 a year, but owes above £10,000". His office brought him in £20,000 a year, and he was known to make large profits by the sale of offices; he maintained his power by corruption and by jealously excluding from office men of high standing and ability. Gilbert Burnet described him as "the most hated minister that had ever been about the king".

Worse men had been less detested, but Danby had none of the amiable virtues which often counteract the odium incurred by serious faults. John Evelyn, who knew him intimately, described him as "a man of excellent natural parts but nothing of generosity or gratefulness". The Earl of Shaftesbury, doubtless no friendly witness, spoke of him as an inveterate liar, "proud, ambitious, revengeful, false, prodigal and covetous to the highest degree", and Burnet supported his unfavourable judgment. His corruption, his submission to a tyrannical wife, his greed, his pale face and lean person, which had replaced the handsome features and comeliness of earlier days, were the subject of ridicule, from the witty sneers of Halifax to the coarse jests of the anonymous writers of innumerable lampoons. By his championship of the national policy he raised up formidable foes abroad without securing a single friend or supporter at home, and his fidelity to the national interests was now, through an act of personal spite, to be the occasion of his downfall. Kenyon describes the Danby administration by the autumn of 1678 as "weak, discredited, unpopular and unsuccessful"; it required only the Popish Plot to bring it down. Danby was accused of using the insane "revelations" of Israel Tonge for his own advantage; but as Kenyon notes, the King gave Danby an explicit order to investigate Tonge's claims, and whatever Danby's personal views, he had no choice but to comply.

=== Impeachment and attainder ===
In appointing a new secretary of state, Danby had preferred Sir William Temple, a strong adherent of the anti-French policy, to Ralph Montagu (later the Duke of Montagu). Montagu, after a quarrel with the Duchess of Cleveland, was dismissed from the king's employment. He immediately went over to the opposition, and in concert with Louis XIV and Paul Barillon, the French ambassador, who supplied him with a large sum of money, arranged a plan for effecting Danby's ruin. He obtained a seat in parliament; and in spite of Danby's endeavour to seize his papers by an order in council, on 20 December 1678 caused two incriminating letters written by Danby to him to be read aloud to the House of Commons by the Speaker. The House immediately resolved on Danby's impeachment. At the foot of each of the letters appeared the king's postscripts, "I approve of this letter. C.R.", in his own handwriting; but they were not read by the Speaker, and were entirely ignored in the proceedings against the minister, thus emphasising the constitutional principle that obedience to the king's orders is not a bar to impeachment.

Danby was charged with having assumed royal powers by treating matters of peace and war without the knowledge of the council, with having raised a standing army on the pretence of war with France, with having obstructed the assembling of Parliament, and with corruption and embezzlement in the treasury. Danby, when communicating the "Popish Plot" to Parliament, had from the first expressed his disbelief in Titus Oates's revelations, he now stood accused of having "traitorously concealed the plot". He was voted guilty by the Commons; but while the Lords were disputing whether the accused peer should have bail, and whether the charges amounted to more than a misdemeanour, Parliament was prorogued on 30 December and dissolved three weeks later. While Danby had few friends, the debate in the Lords showed a notable reluctance to impeach a Crown servant for simply carrying out Crown policy: Charles Dormer, 2nd Earl of Carnarvon, in a remarkably witty speech, reminded his peers of how many of their predecessors had taken part in impeachments, only to end up being impeached themselves. In March 1679, a new Parliament hostile to Danby was returned, and he was forced to resign the treasurership; but he received a pardon from the king under the Great Seal, and a warrant for a marquessate. His proposed advancement in rank was severely reflected upon in the Lords, Halifax declaring it in the king's presence the recompense of treason, "not to be borne". In the Commons, his retirement from office did not appease his antagonists. The proceedings against him were revived, a committee of privileges deciding on 23 March 1679 that the dissolution of Parliament did not abate the impeachment. The Lords passed a motion for his committal, and, as in Clarendon's case, his banishment. This was rejected by the Commons, who passed a bill of attainder. Danby had gone to the country, but returned to London on 21 April to protest the threatened attainder, and was sent to the Tower of London. In his written defence, he pleaded the King's pardon, but on 5 May 1679, this plea was pronounced illegal by the Commons. The declaration that a Royal Pardon was no defence to impeachment by the House of Commons was repeated by the Commons in 1689, and was finally embodied in the Act of Settlement 1701.

The Commons now demanded judgment against the prisoner from the Lords. Further proceedings, however, were stopped by the dissolution of Parliament in July; but for nearly five years Danby remained in the Tower. A number of pamphlets asserting his complicity in the Popish Plot, and even accusing him of the murder of Sir Edmund Berry Godfrey, were published in 1679 and 1680; they were answered by Danby's secretary, Edward Christian in Reflections. In May 1681 Danby was indicted by the Grand Jury of Middlesex for Godfrey's murder on the accusation of Edward Fitzharris. His petition to the king for a trial by his peers was refused, and an attempt to prosecute the publishers of the false evidence on the king's bench was unsuccessful. For some time all appeals to the king, to Parliament, and to the courts were unavailing; but on 12 February 1684 his application to Chief Justice Jeffreys was successful, and he was set at liberty on bail of £40,000, to appear in the House of Lords in the following session. He visited the king the same day, but took no part in public affairs for the rest of the reign.

== Return to court under William III, 1688–1702 ==
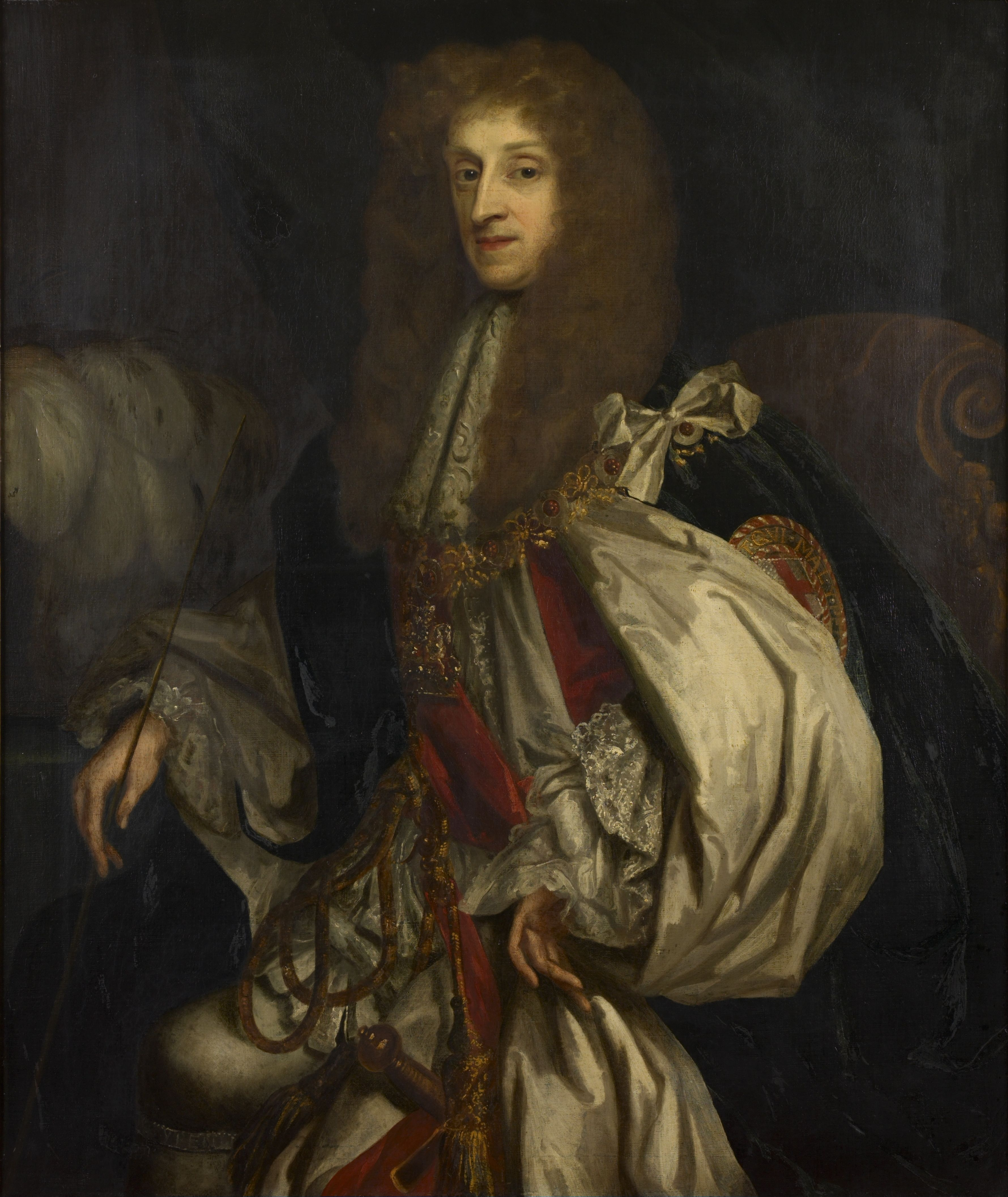
Thomas Osborne, painted later in life as Duke of Leeds

Following the accession of James II, Danby was discharged from his bail by the Lords on 19 May 1685, and the order declaring dissolution of Parliament not to be abatement of impeachment was reversed. He took his seat in the Lords as a leader of the moderate Tory party. Though a supporter of the hereditary principle, he soon found himself more and more opposed to James, and in particular to James's attacks on Anglicanism. He was visited by Dykvelt, William of Orange's agent; and in June 1687 he wrote to William assuring him of his support. On 30 June 1688, he was one of the seven politicians in the Revolution who signed the Invitation to William. In November, he occupied York for William, returning to London to meet William on 26 December. He appears to have thought that William would not claim the crown, and at first supported the theory that as the throne had been vacated by James's flight, the succession fell to Mary. This met with little support and was rejected both by William and by Mary herself, so he voted against the regency and joined with Halifax and the Commons in declaring the prince and princess joint sovereigns.

=== Friction with the Whig ascendancy ===
Danby had rendered extremely important services to William's cause. On 20 April 1689, he was created Marquess of Carmarthen and made lord-lieutenant of the three ridings of Yorkshire. He was, however, still greatly disliked by the Whigs, and William, instead of reinstating him as Lord Treasurer, appointed him to the lesser post of Lord President of the Council in February 1689. His overt vexation and disappointment at this turn of events were increased by the appointment of Halifax as Lord Privy Seal. The antagonism between the "black" and the "white" marquess (the latter being the nickname given to Carmarthen in allusion to his sickly appearance), which had been forgotten in their common hatred to the French and to Rome, revived in all its bitterness. He retired to the country and was seldom present at the council. In June and July, motions were made in Parliament for his removal; but notwithstanding his great unpopularity, on Halifax's retirement in 1690 he again acquired the chief power in the state, which he retained until 1695 by bribes in Parliament and the support of the king and queen.

=== Advisor to the Queen, and return to prominence ===
In 1690, during William's absence in Ireland, Carmarthen was appointed Mary's chief advisor. In 1691, attempting to compromise Halifax, he discredited himself by the patronage of an informer named Fuller, who was soon shown to be an impostor. He was absent in 1692 when the Place Bill was thrown out. In 1693, Carmarthen presided in great state as Lord High Steward at the trial of Lord Mohun; and on 4 May 1694 he was created Duke of Leeds. The same year he supported the Triennial Bill, but opposed the new treason bill as weakening the hands of the executive. Meanwhile, fresh attacks were made upon him. He was accused unjustly of Jacobitism. In April 1695, he was impeached once more by the Commons on suspicion of having received a bribe of 5000 guineas to procure a new charter for the East India Company. Although he had not actually accepted the gold, he had allowed it to remain in his house for over a year, only returning it when the inquiry began. In his defence, while denying that he had intended to take the money ("it had been left with him only to be counted by his secretary") and appealing to his past services, Leeds did not attempt to conceal the fact that according to his experience bribery was an acknowledged and universal custom in public business, and that he himself had been instrumental in obtaining money for others. Meanwhile, his servant, who was said to have been the intermediary between the duke and the company, fled the country; and with no evidence to convict, the proceedings fell apart.

In May 1695, Leeds was ordered to cease his attendance at the council. He returned in October but was not included among the Lords Justices appointed regents during William's absence in this year. In November he was granted a DCL by the University of Oxford. In December, he became a commissioner of trade, and in December 1696, governor of the Royal Fishery Company. He opposed the prosecution of Sir John Fenwick, but supported the action taken by members of both Houses in defence of William's rights in the same year. In 1698, he entertained Tsar Peter the Great at Wimbledon. He had for some time lost the real direction of affairs, and in 1699 he was compelled to retire from office and from the lord-lieutenancy of Yorkshire.

== Retirement from public life, 1702–1712 ==
In Queen Anne's reign, in his old age, the Duke of Leeds was described as "a gentleman of admirable natural parts, great knowledge and experience in the affairs of his own country, but of no reputation with any party. He hath not been regarded, although he took his place at the council board". The veteran statesman, however, by no means acquiesced in his enforced retirement, and continued to take an active part in politics. As a zealous churchman and Protestant, he still possessed a following. In 1705 he supported a motion that the Church of England was in danger, and humiliated Thomas Wharton, 1st Marquess of Wharton, who spoke against the motion, by reminding him that he had once used a church pulpit as a lavatory. In 1710 in Henry Sacheverell's case, he spoke in defence of hereditary rights. In November of this year he obtained a renewal of his pension of £3500 a year from the post office which he was holding in 1694, and in 1711 at the age of eighty was a competitor for the office of Lord Privy Seal. Leeds's long and eventful career, however, terminated soon afterwards by his death in Easton Neston, Northamptonshire, England on 26 July 1712.

Osborne was buried in the Osborne family chapel at All Hallows Church, Harthill, South Yorkshire. He had purchased the Harthill estate while Earl of Danby, and had a fine mortuary chapel built in the north-east corner of All Hallows Church.

Leeds's estates and titles passed to eldest surviving son and heir Peregrine (1659–1729), who had been in the house of Lords as Baron Osborne since 1690, but is best remembered as a naval officer in the Royal Navy, where he rose to the rank of vice admiral.

== Family ==
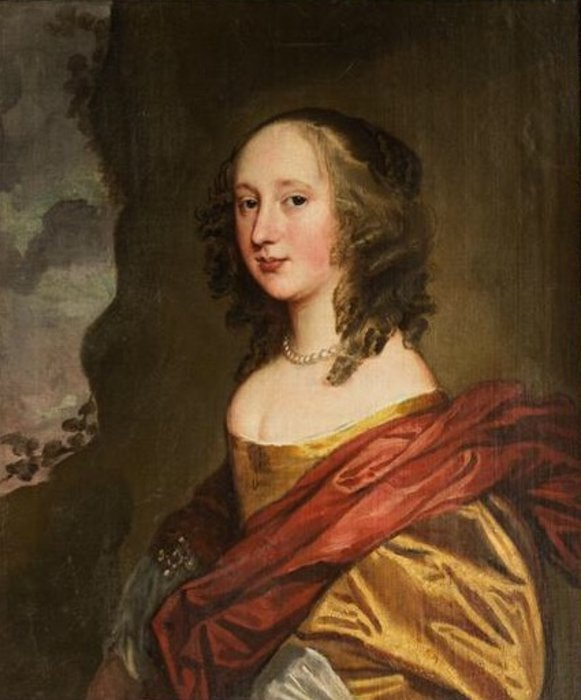
Bridget Osborne, Duchess of Leeds

Thomas Osborne and his wife Bridget, daughter of Montagu Bertie, 2nd Earl of Lindsey married in 1651. They had nine children:

- Lady Catherine Osborne,(1653 – 1702) married Hon. James Herbert and had issue
- Edward Osborne, Viscount Latimer (c.1655 – January 1689), married Elizabeth Bennet (d. 1680), without surviving issue
- son (b. c. 1657?), died an infant
- Lady Anne Osborne (1657–1722), married first Robert Coke of Holkham (d. 1679) and had issue, married second Horatio Walpole (d. 1717), without issue
- Peregrine Osborne, 2nd Duke of Leeds (1659–1729)
- Lady Sophia Osborne (1661 – 8 December 1746), married first Donough O'Brien, Lord Ibrackan without issue, married second William Fermor, 1st Baron Leominster and had issue
- Lady Bridget Osborne (1664 d. 9 May 1718), married first Charles FitzCharles, 1st Earl of Plymouth without issue, married second Rt. Rev. Philip Bisse
- Lady Martha Osborne (c.1664 – 11 September 1689), married, on 22 May 1678, Charles Granville, 2nd Earl of Bath without issue
- daughter (date unknown), died an infant

Bridget, Duchess of Leeds, died at Wimbledon in June 1703.

== See also ==
- Nathaniel Bladen, was Steward to Danby for almost 30 years from the 1660s to the 1690s.

== Notes ==
=== Attribution ===
Parliament of England
Preceded by Metcalfe Robinson and John Scott	Member of Parliament for York; 1665–1673; With: Metcalfe Robinson	Succeeded by Metcalfe Robinson and Sir Henry Thompson
Political offices
Preceded by The Earl of Anglesey	Treasurer of the Navy jointly with Sir Thomas Littleton 1668–1671; 1668–1673	Succeeded by Edward Seymour
Preceded by The Lord Clifford of Chudleigh	Chief Minister of Great Britain; Lord High Treasurer; 1673–1679	Succeeded by In Commission (First Lord The Earl of Essex)
Preceded by The Viscount Preston	Lord President of the Council; 1689–1699	Succeeded by The Earl of Pembroke and Montgomery
Military offices
Preceded by The Lord Langdale	Governor of Kingston-upon-Hull; 1689–1699	Succeeded by The Duke of Newcastle
Honorary titles
Preceded by Sir Thomas Slingsby, Bt	High Sheriff of Yorkshire; 1661	Succeeded by Sir Thomas Gower, Bt
Preceded by The Duke of Buckingham	Lord Lieutenant of the West Riding of Yorkshire; 1674–1679	Succeeded by The 1st Earl of Burlington
Preceded by The 2nd Duke of Newcastle-upon-Tyne	Lord Lieutenant of the West Riding of Yorkshire; 1689–1699	Succeeded by The 2nd Earl of Burlington
Preceded by The Earl of Mulgrave	Custos Rotulorum of the East Riding of Yorkshire; 1689–1699	Succeeded by The 1st Duke of Newcastle-upon-Tyne
Preceded by The Viscount Fitzhardinge	Lord Lieutenant of Somerset jointly with The Earl of Devonshire; The Earl of Dorset; 1690–1691	Succeeded by The Duke of Ormonde
Preceded by The Earl of Kingston-upon-Hull	Lord Lieutenant of the East Riding of Yorkshire; 1691–1699	Succeeded by The 1st Duke of Newcastle-upon-Tyne
Preceded by The Earl Fauconberg	Lord Lieutenant of the North Riding of Yorkshire; 1692–1699	Succeeded by The Viscount of Irvine
Legal offices
Preceded by The 1st Duke of Newcastle-upon-Tyne	Justice in Eyre north of the Trent; 1711–1712	Succeeded by The Marquess of Dorchester
Peerage of England
New creation	Duke of Leeds; 1694–1712	Succeeded by Peregrine Osborne
New creation	Marquess of Carmarthen; 1689–1712	Succeeded by Peregrine Osborne
New creation	Earl of Danby; 1674–1712	Succeeded by Peregrine Osborne
New creation	Viscount Latimer; 1673–1712	Succeeded by Peregrine Osborne
New creation	Baron Osborne (descended by acceleration); 1673–1690	Succeeded by Peregrine Osborne
Peerage of Scotland
New creation	Viscount Osborne (descended by surrender); 1673	Succeeded by Peregrine Osborne
Baronetage of England
Preceded by Edward Osborne	Baronet (of Kiveton); 1647–1712	Succeeded by Peregrine Osborne
