= Edward Osborne =

Portrait once believed to be of Sir Edward Osborne, but later identified as John, 1st Lord Mordaunt of Turvey (as advised by The Clothworkers' Company)

Sir Edward Osborne (1530?–1591), was one of the principal merchants of London in the later sixteenth century, and Lord Mayor of London in 1583.

== Early life ==
Osborne was the eldest son of Richard Osborne of Ashford, Kent, by his wife, Jane Broughton. In May 1547, although another account makes the date three years later, he was apprenticed to Sir William Hewit (or Hewett), clothworker, one of the principal merchants of London and lord mayor in 1559. His admission to the freedom of the Worshipful Company of Clothworkers is assigned to 8 May 1554, although it possibly took place in 1551. (Note: cf. Gregory, Lord Mayors of the Clothworker's Company, manuscript preserved at Clothworker's Hall.)

According to a romantic legend, which in its main feature may be accepted, Hewett's infant daughter was dropped by a careless nurse from an apartment on London Bridge into the current below. Young Osborne immediately leaped into the river and saved the child. The date of this event must have been about 1545, as the lady, who became Osborne's wife, was twenty-three years old at the time of her father's death in January 1566–67.

Pictorial representations of Osborne's feat are preserved at Clothworker's Hall and at Hornby Castle, Yorkshire, the seat of the Duke of Leeds.

In his early days Osborne travelled, and probably resided much abroad, principally at Madrid, and in 1561 he was well known as a merchant and financial agent. (Note: State Papers, For. Ser. 1561-2 pp. 186, 390-1, 406, 1563 p. 46) On the death of his father-in-law (1566/67), Osborne acted as executor jointly with his wife, and succeeded to Hewett's extensive business, his mansion in Philpot Lane, and to the greater part of his estates.

== Merchant and politician ==
Osborne engaged extensively in foreign commerce, trading principally with Spain and Turkey. On 17 February 1569, his depositions, together with those of John Stow, were taken as to his knowledge of the handwriting of the Spanish ambassador. (Note: Cal. State Papers, For. 1569-71, p. 34) He was at the time the owner of a well-appointed ship. (Note: ib. p. 439) He was governor of the Turkey Company, and his name heads a list of principal members of the company on a petition to the lord treasurer in 1584 to be "mean [mediator] unto her Majesty for the loan of ten thousand pounds' weight of bullion for certain years for the better maintenance of their trade". He made zealous efforts to procure a charter for the company, and before and after its incorporation he frequently petitioned the court for redress of injuries committed upon their fleet, trade, and factors by pirates and others. (Note: State Papers, Dom. 1547-80 p. 512, 1581-90 p. 19) He represented that the company was willing to pay the expenses of the queen's ambassador at Constantinople. These negotiations continued through 1590 and 1591, (Note: ib. 1581-90 pp. 37, 657, 671-2, 1591-4 pp. 59, 88-89) and the company was finally incorporated under the title of 'Merchants of the Levant trading to Turkey and Venice,' with Osborne as their first governor. The first record of Osborne's connection with the company is under date of 23 September 1571, when he appears at a court meeting of the governors of St. Thomas's Hospital. On 5 November, following he was elected treasurer of the hospital, (Note: Notes and Queries, 7th ser. vii. 422, 423) and served the office of president from 1586 to 1591. (Note: Remembrancia, p. 156n)

On 7 July 1573, he was elected alderman of Castle Baynard Ward, removing to Candlewick Ward on 10 July 1576. He became Sheriff of the City of London on 1 August 1575, and was chosen Lord Mayor on 29 September 1583. On 14 December, he asked Francis Walsingham to prevent carriers travelling in the suburbs of London by packhorse or cart on the sabbath-day. (Note: Cal. State Papers, Dom. 1581-90, p. 136)

On 31 December, he informed the council that he had committed to Bridewell Irish beggars found in the streets of London, and asked that they might be sent back to Ireland and no more permitted to come to London. (Note: ib. p. 142) More than once during his year of office he had occasion to vindicate the city's right to appoint persons of their own choice to vacant city offices. (Note: ib. pp. 159, 187; cf. Stow, Survey of London, ii. 542)

As a leading member of the Clothworker's Company, Osborne was frequently appointed by the crown, alone or with others, to adjudicate in commercial disputes, especially those relating to the cloth trade. (Note: State Papers, Dom. 1581-90, pp. 202, 411; Acts of Privy Council, Dasent, viii. 166-7, 194-5; cf. Lansdowne MSS. xxxviii. No. 16) Like other merchants, he had considerable money transactions with the principal personages of his time. (Note: Hunter, South Yorkshire, 1828, i. 142) Osborne was knighted at Westminster, most likely on 2 February 1584. He was also elected to represent the city in parliament in 1586.

== Death ==
He died in 1591, and was buried at St Dionis Backchurch, where a monument existed to his memory until the destruction of the church in the Great Fire of London. Soon after his marriage he appears to have lived in Sir William Hewett's house in Philpot Lane, as all his children were baptised in the parish church of St Dionis. The Yorkshire estates, also left by his father-in-law, were too distant for residence, and Osborne made his country home at Parsloes Manor. He left no will, and no grant of administration of his estate is on record. It is probable that he settled his whole estate by deed at the time of his second marriage.

== Family ==
Osborne was first married, in 1562, to Anne Hewitt (or Hewett), then about eighteen years old, and her father's sole heiress. She brought him an estate in Barking, Essex, besides lands in Wales and Harthill in Yorkshire. Anne died at an early age, and was buried at St Martin Orgars on 14 July 1585.

By her, he had five children:

1. Alice - baptised in March 1562/1563
2. Hewett - born March 1566/1567 and was knighted
3. Anne - born March 1570
4. Edward - born November 1572
5. Jane - born November 1578. (Note: Registers of St. Dionis Backchurch: Hart. Soc. passim)

Osborne married, secondly (15 September 1588), Margaret Chapman of St. Olave's, Southwark, by whom he had no issue. She died in 1602 (having married, secondly, Robert Clark, a baron of the exchequer), and was buried beside her first husband in St. Dionis Backchurch.

Osborne's daughter Alice married Sir John Peyton, 1st Baronet in 1580. Osborne's grandson, Sir Edward Osborne, of Kiveton, Yorkshire, created a baronet 13 July 1620, was the son of Sir Hewett Osborne, and father of Sir Thomas Osborne, 1st Duke of Leeds. A half-length portrait of Osborne in armour is in the possession of the Duke of Leeds. A copy of this portrait is in Clothworkers' Hall.
