= Henry Danvers, 1st Earl of Danby =

English soldier

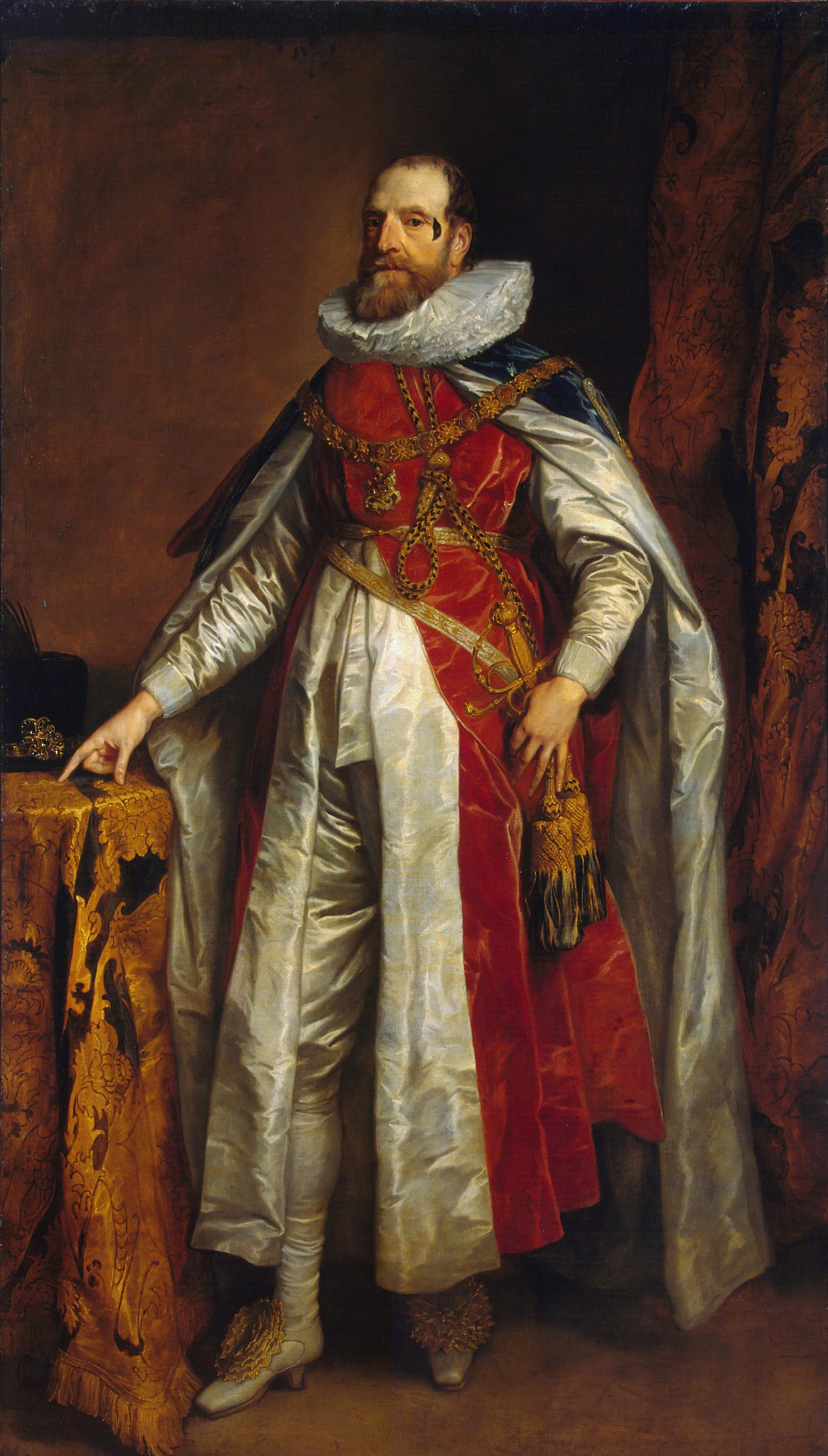
Henry Danvers, Earl of Danby in a portrait of the 1630s by Anthony van Dyck.

Henry Danvers, 1st Earl of Danby (28 June 1573 – 20 January 1643/4) was an English soldier. Outlawed after a killing in 1594, he regained favour after successful military service in Ireland and was raised to the Peerage of England in 1603. He became a Knight of the Garter in 1633.

== Life ==
He was the second son of John Danvers, of Dauntsey, Wiltshire, by his wife Elizabeth Nevill, the youngest daughter and coheiress of John Nevill, 4th Baron Latymer. He was born at Dauntsey on 28 June 1573, and at an early age became a page to Sir Philip Sidney, whom he accompanied to the Low Countries, and was probably present at the battle of Zutphen in 1586. After his master's death, he served as a volunteer under Maurice, Count of Nassau, who appointed him at the age of eighteen to the command of a company of infantry. Danvers took part in the siege of Rouen in 1591, and was there knighted for his services in the field by Robert Devereux, 2nd Earl of Essex, in command of the expedition.

His father died on 19 December 1593, and on 4 October 1594 Henry Long, son of Robert Long and brother of Sir Walter Long, was killed. A feud had existed between the Long and Danvers families for some time past. According to one account, Henry Long was dining in the middle of the day with a party of friends in Corsham, when Danvers, followed by his brother Charles and a number of retainers, burst into the room, and shot Long dead on the spot. The brothers then fled on horseback to Whitley Lodge, near Titchfield, the seat of Henry Wriothesley, 3rd Earl of Southampton. With Southampton's assistance, they succeeded after some days in making their way out of the country. A coroner's inquisition was held, and the brothers were outlawed. Another version of the story asserted that Henry Long was killed by Sir Henry Danvers in defending his brother Sir Charles against Long and his company.

The brothers joined the French army, and became known to Henry IV of France for their conspicuous bravery. In 1597, Henry Danvers served under Charles Howard, 1st Earl of Nottingham, apparently as a captain of a man-of-war in the expedition of that year to the coast of Spain.

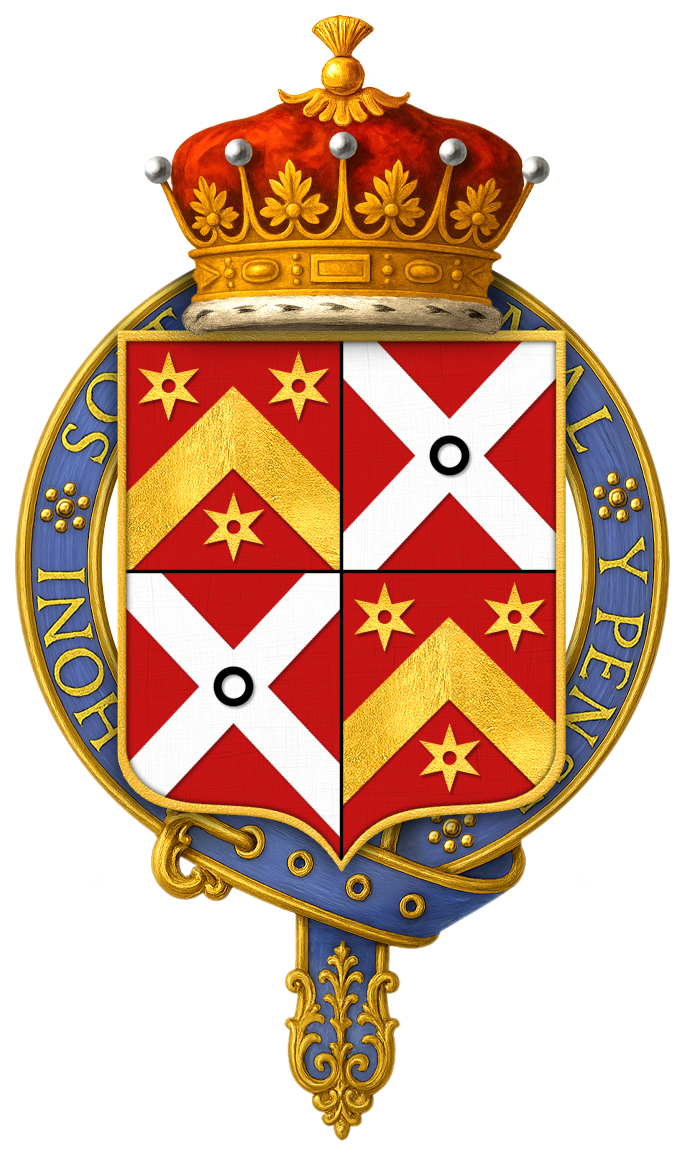
Arms of Sir Henry D'Anvers, 1st Earl of Danby, KG

After Henry IV had interceded with Elizabeth I, and Gilbert Talbot, 7th Earl of Shrewsbury with Sir Robert Cecil, the brothers were pardoned on 30 June 1598, and they returned to England in the following August; but it was not until 1604 that the coroner's indictment was found bad on a technical ground and the outlawry reversed. Henry was, soon after his return, employed in Ireland under the Earl of Essex, and Charles Blount, 8th Baron Mountjoy, successive lords-lieutenant of Ireland. In September 1599 he was appointed lieutenant-general of the horse, in July 1601 governor of Armagh, and in July 1602 sergeant-major-general of the army in Ireland. By James I he was created Baron Danvers of Dauntsey, Wiltshire, in 1603 for service during the victory at Kinsale in Ireland, and two years afterwards was restored in blood as heir to his father, notwithstanding the attainder of his elder brother Charles, who had been beheaded in 1601 for his share in Essex's insurrection.

On 14 November 1607, Danvers was appointed lord president of Munster, a post which he retained until 1615, when he sold it to Donogh O'Brien, 4th Earl of Thomond. In April 1613 he joined Anne of Denmark's progress to Bath. On 15 June 1613 he obtained the grant in reversion of the office of keeper of St. James's Palace, and on 23 March 1621, he was made governor of the isle of Guernsey for life.

By Charles I he was created Earl of Danby on 5 February 1626, and on 20 July 1628 was sworn a member of the privy council. In 1630, Danby succeeded to the estates of his mother, who after her first husband's death had married Sir Edmund Cary. He was made a councillor of Wales on 12 May 1633, and was installed a knight of the Garter on 7 November in the same year. He was included in a number of commissions by Charles I, formed one of the councils of war appointed on 17 June 1637, and acted as commissioner of the regency from 9 August to 25 November 1641. He never married, and upon his death the barony of Danvers and the earldom of Danby became extinct. Thomas Osborne, 1st Duke of Leeds, best known to history as the Earl of Danby, was his great-nephew.

Towards the close of his life, he suffered from bad health and lived principally in the country. He died at his house in Cornbury Park, Oxfordshire, on 20 January 1644, and was buried in Dauntsey Church, where there is a monument of white marble to his memory. On the east side of the monument are lines ostensibly written by his kinsman, George Herbert, who paid a long visit at Dauntsey in 1629. If they are genuinely by him the epitaph must have been written many years before Danby's death, as Herbert died in 1633. Herbert's biographer, John Drury, has, however, questioned the accuracy of the attribution.

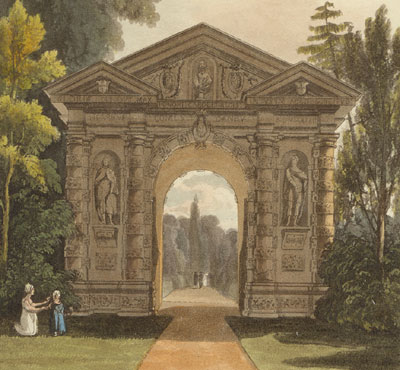
The Danby gateway to the University of Oxford Botanic Garden built in 1633.

On 12 March 1622 Danvers conveyed to the university of Oxford five acres of land, opposite Magdalen College, which had formerly served as a Jewish cemetery, for the encouragement of the study of physic and botany. He had the ground raised and enclosed within a high wall. The gateway of the Oxford Botanic Garden, designed by Nicholas Stone, a master mason who frequently worked with Inigo Jones, still bears the following inscription, 'Gloriae Dei Opt. Max. Honori Caroli Regis, in usum Acad. et Reipub. Henricus comes Danby DD. MDCXXXII.' By his will, he left the rectory of Kirkdale in Yorkshire towards the maintenance of the gardens.

Peerage of England
New creation	Earl of Danby; 1626–1644	Extinct
New creation	Baron Danvers; 1603–1644	Extinct
