= Angram, Long Marston =

Village in North Yorkshire, England

Coordinates: 53.93°N 1.20°W

Angram
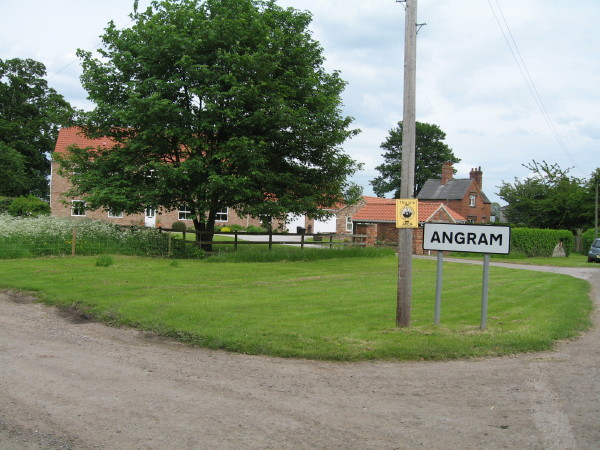
- Entrance to Angram

- Location within North Yorkshire
- OS grid reference: SE519486
- Civil parish: Long Marston
- Unitary authority: North Yorkshire
- Ceremonial county: North Yorkshire
- Region: Yorkshire and the Humber
- Country: England
- Sovereign state: United Kingdom
- Post town: YORK
- Postcode district: YO23
- Dialling code: 01904
- Police: North Yorkshire
- Fire: North Yorkshire
- Ambulance: Yorkshire
- UK Parliament: Wetherby and Easingwold

Angram is a village in the civil parish of Long Marston, near Bilbrough, in North Yorkshire, England.

The name Angram derives from the plural form of the Old English anger meaning 'grassland'.

Angram was historically a township in the ancient parish of Long Marston in the West Riding of Yorkshire. It became a civil parish in 1866. In 1974 the parish was transferred to the new county of North Yorkshire. On 1 April 1988 the parish was absorbed into the civil parish of Long Marston. In 1971 the parish had a population of 32. From 1974 to 2023 it was part of the Borough of Harrogate, it is now administered by the unitary North Yorkshire Council.
