= Robert Waller (York MP) =

Member of the England Parliament for York
- In office 1690–1694
- Preceded by: Viscount Osborne
- Succeeded by: Edward Thompson
- Preceded by: Edward Thompson
- Succeeded by: Tobias Jenkins

Personal details
- Born: Unknown Unknown
- Died: York
- Spouse: Jane
- Children: Penelope

Robert Waller was one of two Members of Parliament for the constituency of York between 1690 and 1694.

== Life and politics ==
Robert was the son of Thomas and Susannah Waller. He was married to Jane and had a daughter, Penelope, and a son. His father was a freeman of the city and a yeoman and plied a trade as an innkeeper. His father amassed enough wealth to become the lord of Middlethorpe Manor.

Robert was a wealthy attorney and aligned politically to the Whig faction. He was an alderman in the city of York and became Lord mayor in 1684. He was also Coroner for the city and Sherriff in 1674–75. He was also registered as a freeman of the city

He was granted the office of keeper of the King's manor house in York for services in bringing support of the city for the Prince of Orange in 1689. On 7 March 1692 he was leased the site of St Mary's Abbey for 31 years.

He was returned as MP for York in 1690. though now considered a Tory. He was active in the 1691-2 session. He is recorded as having participated in 1284 votes during his turn on office. His failure to become Lord Mayor in 1694 may have been a factor in not standing for re-election to Parliament in 1695.

He died on 2 June 1698 intestate in Acomb. His daughter, Penelope, and his widow administered the estate thereafter.

Political offices
Preceded by Viscount Osborne; Edward Thompson	Member of Parliament; 1690–1694	Next: Edward Thompson; Tobias Jenkins
