= Metcalfe Robinson =

English politician

Robinson baronets
- Arms of Robinson of Newby
- Creation date: 1660
- Status: extinct
- Extinction date: 1689
- Arms: vert, a chevron between three bucks at gaze or

Sir Metcalfe Robinson, 1st Baronet (10 March 1629 – 6 February 1689) of Newby-on-Swale and of adjacent Rainton both in the parish of Topcliffe in North Yorkshire, was an English politician who sat in the House of Commons from 1660 to 1679 and from 1685 to 1689.

Robinson was the son of Sir William Robinson (d.1658) of York, Sheriff of Yorkshire in 1638, by his second wife Frances Metcalfe, daughter of Sir Thomas Metcalfe of Nappa, in Wensleydale. He was educated at St John's College, Cambridge, matriculating in 1645.

In 1660, Robinson was elected Member of Parliament for York in the Convention Parliament. On 30 July 1660, he was created Baronet Robinson of Newby. In 1661 he was re-elected MP for York in the Cavalier Parliament and sat until 1679. He was re-elected MP for York in 1685 and sat until 1689.

Robinson died on 6 February 1688 at the age of 59 and was buried in St Columba's Church, Topcliffe, where survives his elaborate mural monument with bust.

Robinson married Margaret Darcy daughter of Sir William Darcy of Witton, Durham. They had no children and the baronetage became extinct, while his estates passed to his nephew, William Robinson, for whom a second Baronetage Robinson of Newby would be created.

Baronetage of England
New creation	Baronet (of Newby); 1660–1689	Extinct

== See also ==
- Robinson baronets
