= Anne Mee =

British artist (1765–1851)

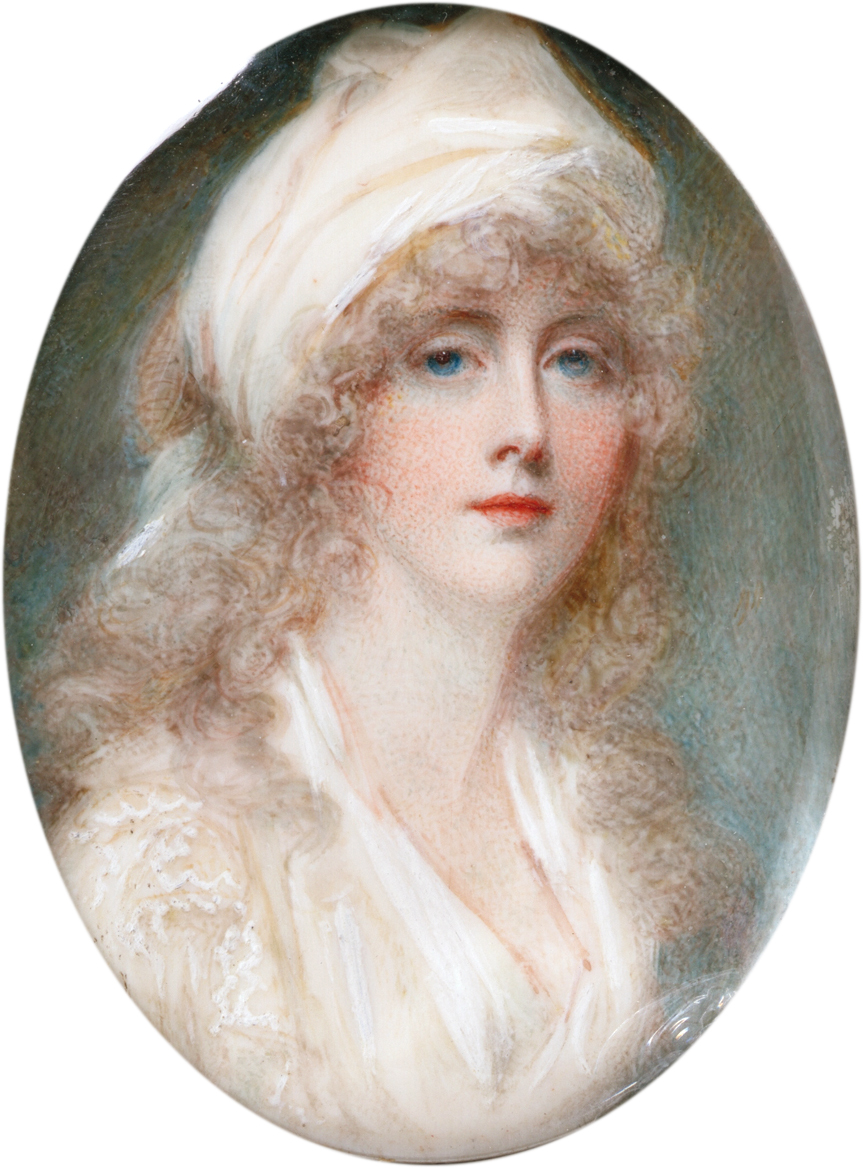
- Self-portrait (ca 1795)
- Born: Anne Foldsone; 1765
- Died: 28 May 1851 (aged 85–86); London, United Kingdom
- Known for: Miniaturist
- Spouse: Joseph Mee (m. 1793)

Anne Mee, née Foldsone (1765–1851) was a prolific English miniature painter of the late 18th and early 19th centuries.

== Life ==
The eldest child of John Foldsone, she was educated at Madame Pomier's school in Queen Square, Bloomsbury, London. She began to paint at age 12, with tuition from George Romney, and after her father died in 1784, did so to support her family.

Anne Mee exhibited occasionally at the Royal Academy between 1815 and 1837. She died in Hammersmith on 28 May 1851.

== Family ==
Anne Foldsone married Joseph Mee, an Irish barrister from Armagh, in 1793; they had six children. A son, Arthur Patrick Mee, practised as an architect, and exhibited at the Royal Academy from 1824 to 1837.

== Career ==
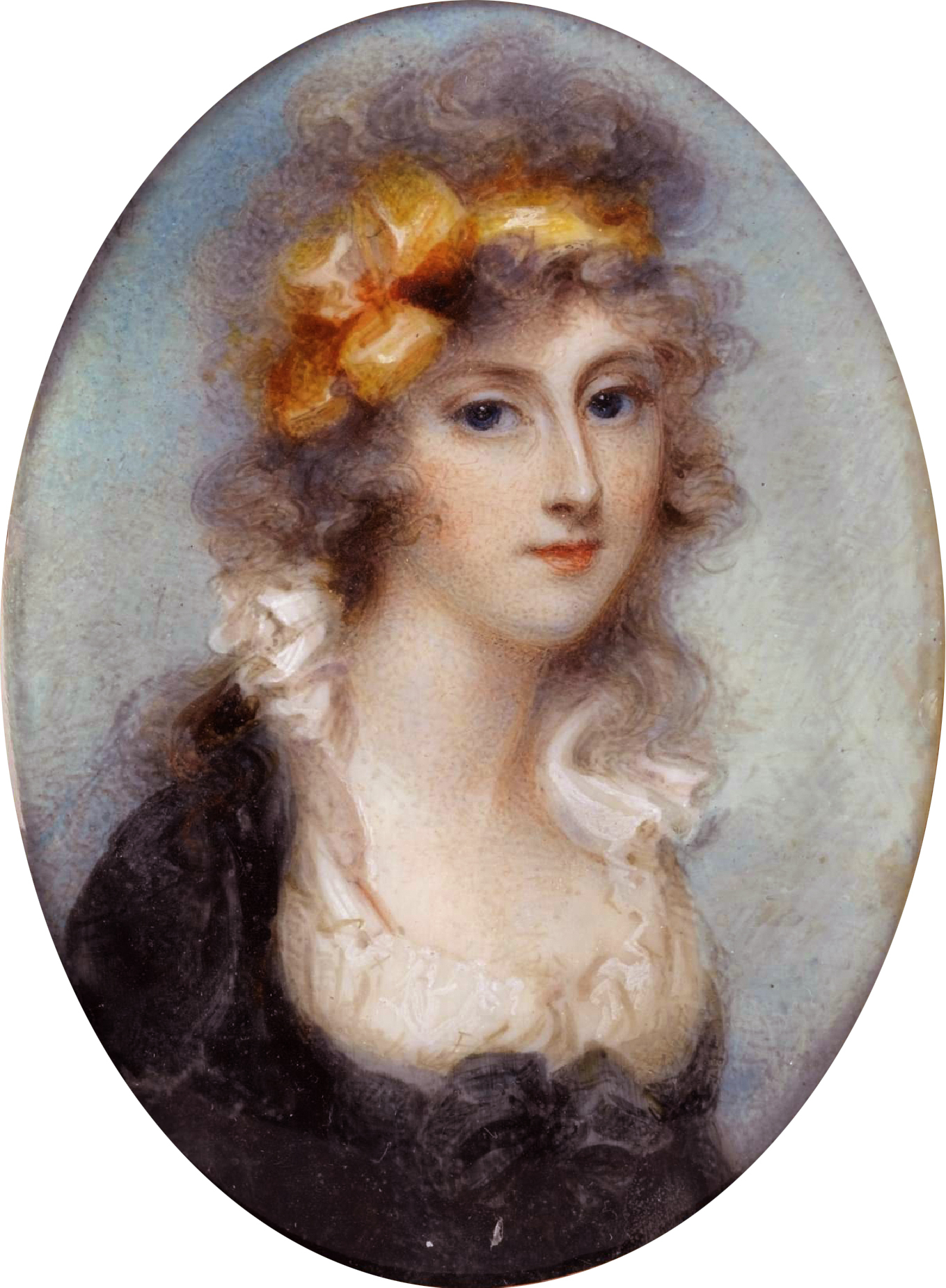
Susan, Lady Carbery (d. 1828), miniature by Anne Mee

As Miss Foldsone, she received royal and aristocratic patronage; and Horace Walpole, in his letters to Mary Berry of 1790–1, mentioned that she was at Windsor, painting the princesses. The Prince Regent gave Anne Mee employment in painting portraits of fashionable beauties, and many of these pictures went to Windsor. Some of her portraits were engraved for the Court Magazine, La Belle Assemblée, and similar periodicals. In 1812 she started a serial publication, Gallery of Beauties of the Court of George III, with her own portrait at the front, but just one number was issued.

== Selected work ==
=== Miniatures ===
- Mrs. Mary Robinson (ca. 1790)
- Portrait of a Woman, Said to Be Lady Sophia Boyle (ca. 1790)
- Portrait of a Woman, Possibly Barbara (1768–1829), Marchioness of Donegall (ca. 1790)
- Portrait of Lord Dugannon (ca. 1791–1899)
- Portrait Miniature of Frances, Countess of Dartmouth (ca. 1791–1899)
- Portrait Miniature of Princess Amelia (ca. 1791–1899)
- Anne Mee (ca. 1795)
- Elizabeth Boughton, Lady Templetown (1795–1800)
- George Stewart 8th Earl of Galloway (1795–1812)
- Lady Jane Halliday (1796)
- Lady Margaret Janet Fordyce (later Lady Margaret Burges) (18th century)
- Lady Hammond (late 18th - early 19th century)
- A Young Man, Thought to Be One of the Artist's Sons (late 18th - early 19th century)
- A Young Man, Thought to Be One of the Artist's Sons (late 18th - early 19th century)
- A Man, Thought to Be Joseph Mee (ca. 1800–1850)
- Lady Jersey (ca. 1800–1850)
- Lady Catherine Bligh, Lady Charles Stewart (ca. 1804–1865)
- An Unknown Lady in a White Dress (ca. 1805–1810)
- Isabella, Marchioness of Hertford (ca. 1812–1814)
- Anne Katherine MacDonnell, 2nd Countess of Antrim (ca. 1817–1818)
- Louisa Barbara Catherine Philips, Countess of Lichfield (1819)
- Miss Elliott (1825)
- Susan, Lady Carbery (1828)
- Lady Harriet Elizabeth Georgiana Howard, Countess Gower, later Duchess of Sutherland (ca.1828)
- William Craven, 1st Earl of Craven (19th century)
- Charlotte Townshend (before 1851)
- Anne 'Nanette' Hawkins, Lady Crewe (date unknown)
- Sir George Crewe, 8th Bt. as a Child (date unknown)
- Thomas William Anson, 1st Earl of Lichfield, PC, MP (date unknown)
- Two Children Embracing (date unknown)
- Portrait of a Lady Wearing a Turban (date unknown)
- Lt. Col. Thomas Grosvenor (date unknown)
- Lady Anne Barnard (date unknown)

=== Prints after Anne Mee ===
- Duchess of Rutland (ca. 1787–1813), engraving by Anthony Cardon
- Mary Berry (1790), engraving by Henry Adlard
- Mrs. Anne Murray Keith (1793–1857), engraving by Samuel Freeman
- Fanny Crosbie (ca. 1796–1854), engraving by Maxim Gauci
- Frances Marchioness of Bute (1800–1814), engraving by Caroline Watson
- Mary Isabella Dutchess of Rutland (1804), engraving by Charles Turner
- Rt. Hon. Maria Letitia Countess Manvers (ca. 1804–1850), engraving by James Thomson
- Princess Sophia (1806), drawing by Henry Bone
- Emily Charlotte Chambers (ca. 1808), engraving by Henry Hoppner Meyer
- Princess Amelia (1810), engraving by John Samuel Agar
- Anne Caulfeild, Countess of Charlemont (1812), engraving by John Samuel Agar
- Charlotte Ashburnham, Countess of Ashburnham when Viscountess St Asaph (1812), engraving by Niccolò Schiavonetti, published by Anne Mee
- Charlotte Sophia, Duchess of Beaufort (1812), engraving by Anthony Cardon
- Charles Manners, 4th Duke of Rutland (1812), engraving by Anthony Cardon
- Jane Dalrymple-Hamilton (1812), engraving by John Samuel Agar
- Katherine Sophia, Lady Heathcote (1812), engraving by John Samuel Agar, published by Anne Mee
- Mary Isabella Dutchess of Rutland (1812), engraving by Anthony Cardon
- Mrs. Mee (1812), engraving by Henry Hoppner Meyer
- Anne Caulfeild, Countess of Charlemont (1814), drawing by Henry Bone
- Lady Frances Anne Maude, Viscountess Hawarden (early 19th century), engraving by Henry Hoppner Meyer
- Anne Mee (1814), engraving by Henry Richard Cook
- Isabella Horatia, Lady Ravensworth, and her daughter (1816–1887), engraving by Samuel Cousins
- Mrs. Mee (ca. 1819), engraving by Henry Richard Cook, used as a frontispiece for an 1819 edition of Frances Burney's Cecilia
- Harriet Elizabeth Georgiana Leveson-Gower, Duchess of Sutherland (1820), drawing by Henry Bone
- Richard Grenville, 2nd Duke of Buckingham and Chandos (1821), engraving by Robert Cooper
- William Beauchamp Lygon, 2nd Earl Beauchamp (1822), engraving by Edward Scriven
- Richard Grenville Plantagenet Temple, Marquis of Chandos (1822–1839), engraving by Samuel Freeman
- Harriet Anne Chichester, Marchioness of Donegall (1823), engraving by James Thomson
- Arthur Algernon Earl of Essex (ca. 1825), engraving by Jean Alexandre Allais
- Rt. Hon. Maria Letitia Countess Manvers (1827), engraving by James Thomson
- The Rt Hon Henrietta Viscountess Dillon (1828), engraving by James Thomson
- The Rt. Hon. Lady Anne Beckett (1829), engraving by James Thomson
- The Rt. Hon. Lady Anne Beckett (1829), engraving by Thomas Wright
- The Rt Honble Lady Isabella Anne Brydges (ca. 1830–1850), engraving by James Thomson
- Louisa Catherine Osborne, Duchess of Leeds when Marchioness of Carmarthen (1828–1838), engraving by James Thomson
- The Rt Honble Lady Isabella Anne Brydges (ca. 1830–1850), engraving by James Thomson
- Corisande Armandine, Countess of Tankerville (1833), engraving by John Cochran
- Mrs. George Lane Fox (ca. 1833), engraving by James Thomson, illustration to The Portrait Gallery of Distinguished Females (1833)
- The Rt Honble Anne Catherine Macdonel Countess of Antrim (1834), engraving by Henry Richard Cook
- Mary Marchioness of Downshire Baroness of Sandys (ca. 1835–1854), lithograph by Maxim Gauci
- Right Honble Lady Emily Esther Anne Hesketh (1837), engraving by John Cochran
- Lady Elizabeth Reynell (1837), engraved by Daniel John Pound, illustration for The Court Magazine (1837)
- Lady Frances Anne Agar, Viscountess Hawarden, engraving by Henry Hoppner Meyer

== Publications of work ==
- The Portrait Gallery of Distinguished Females, Including Beauties of the Courts of George IV. and William IV. 2 vols. London: Edward Bull, 1833.

== Notes ==
Attribution This article incorporates text from a publication now in the public domain: Lee, Sidney, ed. (1894). "Mee, Anne". Dictionary of National Biography. Vol. 37. London: Smith, Elder & Co.
