= Lord James Townshend =

British politician and naval commander (1785-1842)

Captain Lord James Townshend KCH
- Born: 11 September 1785
- Died: 28 June 1842 (aged 56)
- Spouse: Elizabeth Wallis (m. 1813)
- Father: George Townshend, 1st Marquess Townshend
- Relatives: Charles Townshend, 3rd Viscount Townshend (paternal grandfather); Audrey Etheldreda Townshend (paternal grandmother); Charles Townshend (uncle); George Townshend (half-brother); Lord John Townshend (half-brother); Lord Charles Townshend (half-brother)
- Military career
- Allegiance: United Kingdom
- Branch: Royal Navy
- Service years: c.1806–1842
- Rank: Captain
- Commands: HMS Halifax; HMS Aeolus
- Conflicts: Napoleonic Wars; Battle of San Domingo; War of 1812
- Awards: Knight Commander of the Royal Guelphic Order

Captain Lord James Nugent Boyle Bernardo Townshend KCH (11 September 1785 – 28 June 1842), was a British naval commander and Tory politician.

Townshend was the younger son of George Townshend, 1st Marquess Townshend, by his second wife Anne, daughter of Sir William Montgomery, 1st Baronet. He was the nephew of Charles Townshend and the half-brother of George Townshend, 2nd Marquess Townshend, Lord John Townshend and Lord Charles Townshend. On 21 September 1822, he was appointed major-commandant of the Norfolk Yeomanry Rangers, in place of his brother Lord Charles.

Townshend was a captain in the Royal Navy. He was also appointed a captain in the Norfolk Rangers of Yeomanry Cavalry on 18 April 1831. In 1818 he was returned to parliament as one of two representative for Helston, a constituency mainly controlled by his brother-in-law, the Duke of Leeds. He lost his seat in 1832 when the representation was reduced to one member, but was once again elected in 1835. This time he held the seat until 1837.

Townshend married Elizabeth, daughter of Provo Featherstone Wallis and sister of Provo Wallis, on 13 June 1813. He died in June 1842, aged 56.

Parliament of the United Kingdom
Preceded by William Horne; Hugh Hammersley	Member of Parliament for Helston; 1818–1832; With: Harrington Hudson 1818–1820; Marquess of Carmarthen 1820–1830; Sir Samuel Brooke-Pechell, Bt 1830–1831; Sackville Lane-Fox 1831–1832	Succeeded by Sackville Lane-Fox (representation reduced to one member)
Preceded by Sackville Lane-Fox	Member of Parliament for Helston; 1835–1837	Succeeded by Viscount Cantelupe
