= Francis D'Arcy-Osborne, 7th Duke of Leeds =

British peer and politician (1798–1859)

His Grace Francis D'Arcy-Osborne, 7th Duke of Leeds MP
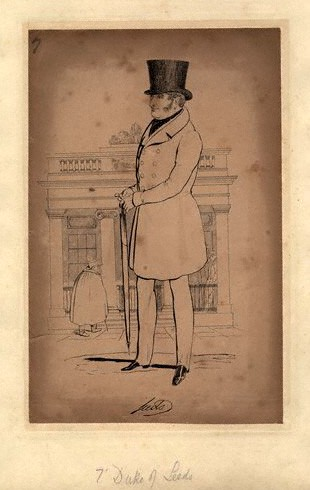
- The Duke of Leeds, 1841

Member of Parliament for Helston
- In office 1826–1830 Serving with Lord James Townshend
- Preceded by: Lord James Townshend; Harrington Hudson
- Succeeded by: Lord James Townshend; Sir Samuel Brooke-Pechell

Personal details
- Born: Francis George Godolphin D'Arcy Osborne; 21 May 1798
- Died: 4 May 1859 (aged 60)
- Resting place: All Hallows Church, Harthill, South Yorkshire
- Spouse: Louisa Catharine Hervey-Bathurst (m. 1828)
- Relations: George Townshend, 1st Marquess Townshend (grandfather)
- Parent(s): George Osborne, 6th Duke of Leeds; Lady Charlotte Townshend

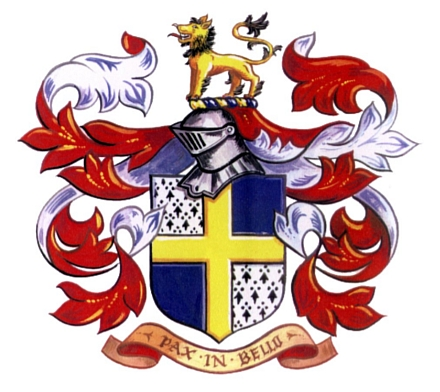
Ancestral arms of the Osborne family, Dukes of Leeds

Francis George Godolphin D'Arcy D'Arcy-Osborne, 7th Duke of Leeds (21 May 1798 – 4 May 1859), styled Earl of Danby from birth until 1799 and Marquess of Carmarthen from 1799 until 1838, was a British peer and politician.

== Early life ==
Osborne was the son of George Osborne, 6th Duke of Leeds, and his wife, Charlotte Townshend. His younger brother was Lord Conyers George Thomas William Osborne (1812–1831) and his sister was Lady Charlotte Mary Anne Georgiana Osborne (d. 1836), the wife of Sackville Lane-Fox, MP (the third son of James Fox-Lane, MP, of Bramham Park).

His mother was the eldest daughter of George Townshend, 1st Marquess Townshend and, his second wife, Anne Montgomery (a daughter of Sir William Montgomery, 1st Baronet of Magbiehill and Mistress of the Robes to Caroline, Princess of Wales). Among her extended maternal family was her uncle Captain Lord James Townshend.

== Career ==
As Marquess of Carmarthen, he held the parliamentary seat of Helston from 1826 to 1830 and on 2 July 1838, was summoned to the House of Lords in his father's barony of Osborne. A few weeks later, he inherited his father's dukedom; and added the name of D'Arcy to his surname by Royal Licence in 1849.

== Personal life ==
On 24 April 1828, he married Louisa Catherine Hervey-Bathurst (née Caton; 1793–1874). She was the widow of Sir Felton Hervey-Bathurst, 1st Baronet, and the third daughter and co-heiress of Richard Caton of Maryland. Louisa had three sisters, Marianne (the wife of Robert Patterson, and, after his death, Richard Wellesley, 1st Marquess Wellesley), Elizabeth (the wife of George Stafford-Jerningham, 8th Baron Stafford), and Emily (the wife of John McTavish).

The couple had no children and, upon the duke's death on 4 May 1859, his titles passed to other members of his family – the dukedom of Leeds went to his first cousin, the 2nd Lord Godolphin, whereas the baronies of Darcy de Knayth and Conyers went to his nephew, Sackville Lane-Fox, along with the Portuguese countship of Mértola.

The Duke was a greater lover of outdoor pursuits. During the 1840s and early 1850s, he traveled yearly to Het Loo in the Netherlands to participate in falconry with the Royal Loo Hawking Club, of which he was an early member. The Club's president, Prince Alexander of the Netherlands, was a close personal friend of the Duke's. In 1843, when Prince Alexander visited England and Scotland, the 7th Duke of Leeds composed his itinerary and hosted him at his Scottish estate Mar Lodge near Braemar.

The 7th Duke of Leeds and his wife are buried in the Osborne family chapel at All Hallows Church, Harthill, South Yorkshire.

Parliament of the United Kingdom
Preceded by Lord James Townshend; Harrington Hudson	Member of Parliament for Helston; 1826–1830; With: Lord James Townshend	Succeeded by Lord James Townshend; Sir Samuel Brooke-Pechell
Peerage of England
Preceded by George Osborne	Duke of Leeds; 1838–1859	Succeeded by George Osborne
Preceded by George Osborne	Baron Darcy de Knayth; 1838–1859	Succeeded by Sackville Lane-Fox
Preceded by George Osborne	Baron Osborne (writ of acceleration); 1838–1859	Succeeded by Sackville Lane-Fox
Portuguese nobility
Preceded by George Osborne	Count of Mértola; 1838–1859	Succeeded by Sackville Lane-Fox
