= James Thomson (engraver) =

British engraver (1788–1850)

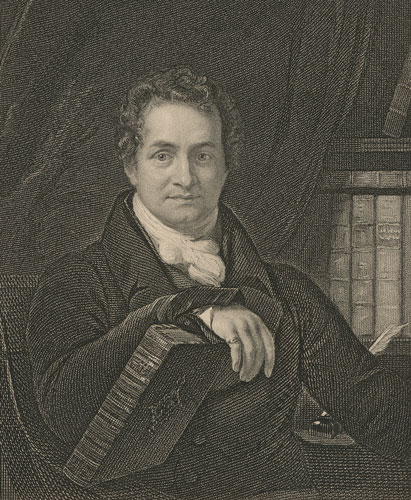
Thomas Frognall Dibdin, engraving by Thomson after Thomas Phillips.

James Thomson (1788–1850) was a British engraver, known for his portraits. He completed his apprenticeship in engraving and then established himself independently, following the dot and stipple style. His engravings and paintings featured both leading figures of his day and those of previous periods.

== Life ==
Thomson was baptised on 5 May 1788 at Mitford, Northumberland, where his father James Thomson, who later became vicar of Ormesby in Yorkshire, was then acting as curate. He was sent to London to be apprenticed to an engraver named Mackenzie. After completing an apprenticeship with Mackenzie, he worked for two years under Anthony Cardon, and then established himself independently. He became an accomplished engraver in the dot and stipple style. He died at his house in Albany Street, London, on 27 September 1850.

== Works ==
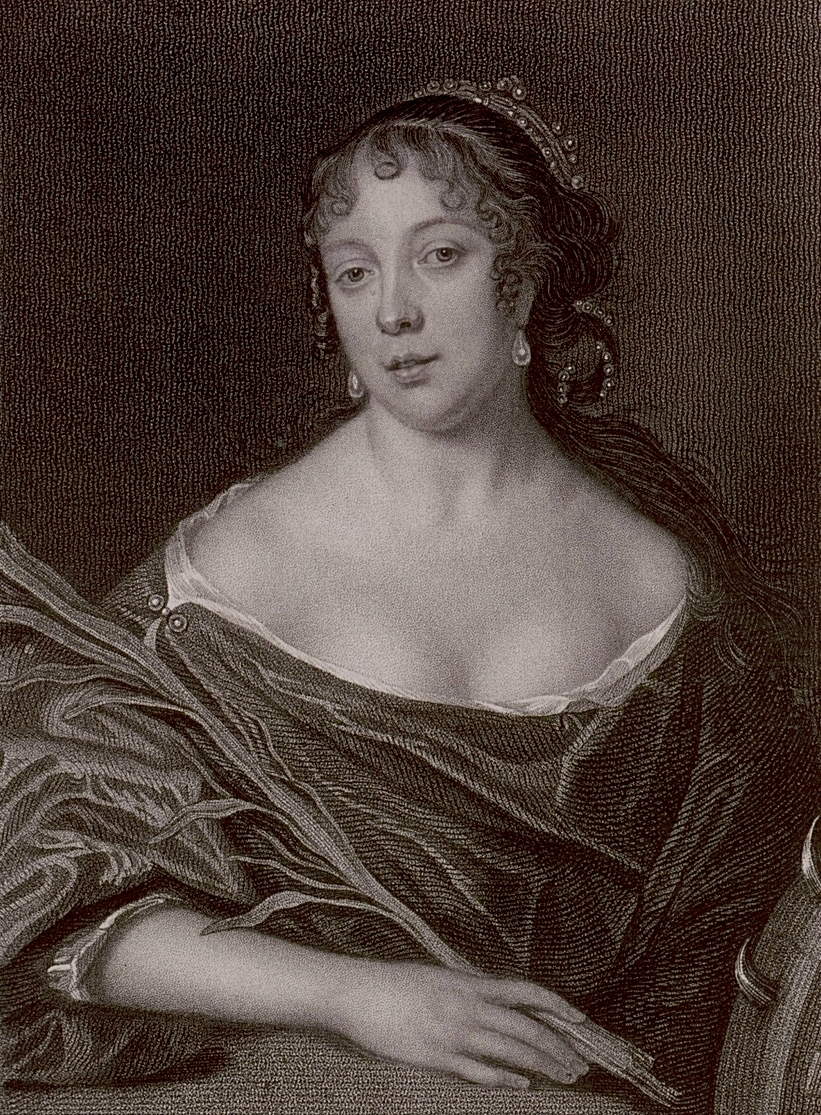
Elisabeth Pepys in a stipple engraving by Thomson, after a 1666 painting (now destroyed) by John Hayls.

Working mainly on portraits, Thomson was engaged for major illustrated works including Edmund Lodge's Portraits of Illustrious Personages, Fisher's National Portrait Gallery (of Henry Fisher, Son and Jackson, edited by William Jerdan), Horace Walpole's Anecdotes of Painting, Charles Heath's Book of Beauty, Anne Mee's Gallery of Beauties, the Keepsake, the Court Magazine, and Ancient Marbles in the British Museum.

Thomson's single plates included the portraits:

- Mrs. Storey, after Thomas Lawrence, 1826
- Lady Burghersh and her sisters, after Lawrence, 1827
- John Wesley, after John Jackson, 1828
- Charles James Blomfield, Bishop of London, after George Richmond, 1847
- Queen Victoria riding with Lord Melbourne, after Sir Francis Grant
- Prince Albert, after Sir William Charles Ross
- Louis-Philippe and his consort Maria Amalia of Naples and Sicily, a pair, after Édouard Louis Dubufe, 1850
- Elizabeth Pepys, wife of Samuel Pepys

== Family ==
With his wife Diana Lloyd, Thomson had two daughters: Eliza and Ann. One daughter, Ann (or Anne), married the painter Frederick Goodall.
