= Anne Townshend, Marchioness Townshend =

British courtier

The Most Honourable The Marchioness of Townshend
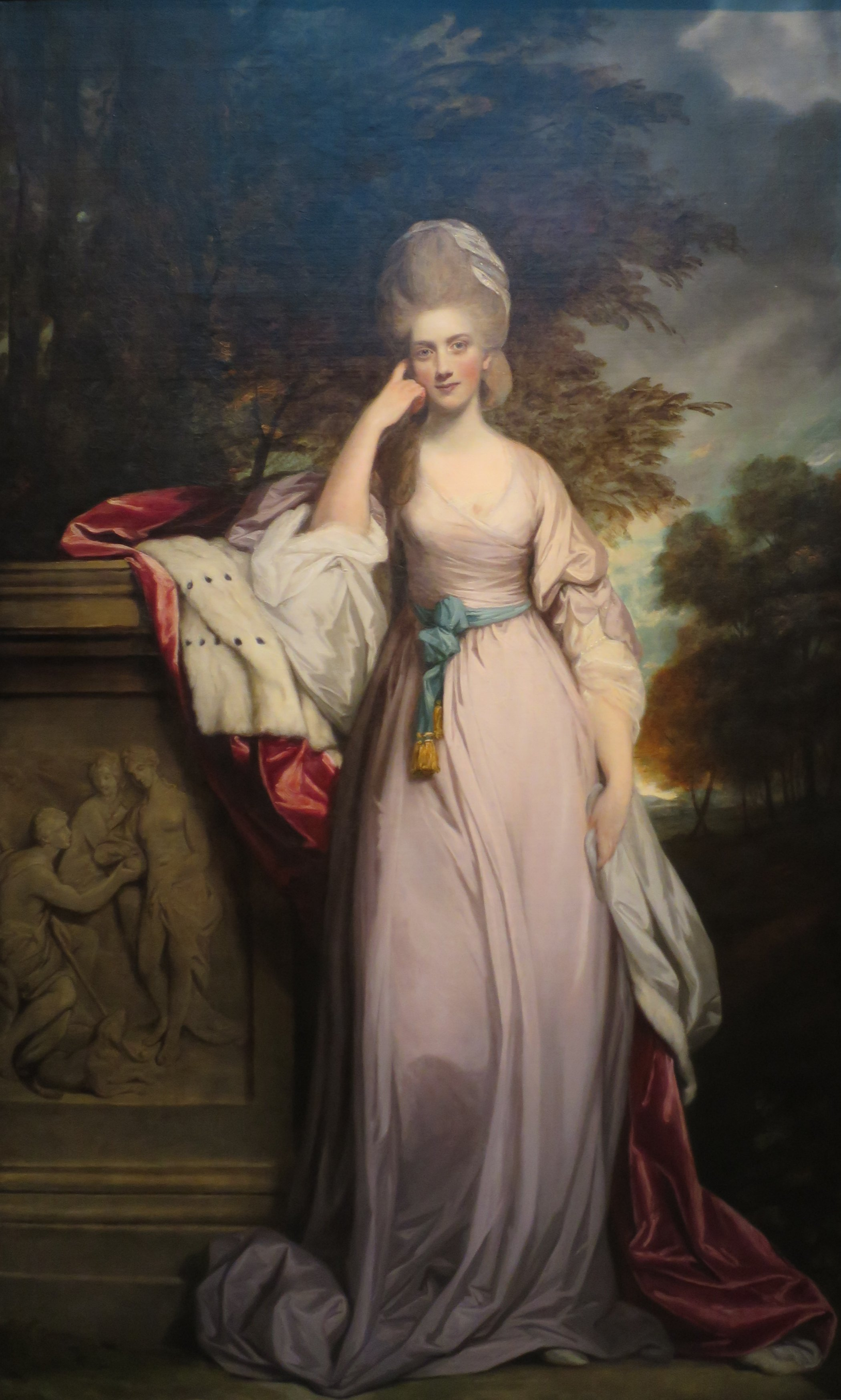
- Portrait of Anne, Viscountess Townshend (c. 1780)
- Born: Anne Montgomery c.1752
- Died: 29 March 1819
- Noble family: Montgomery
- Spouse: George Townshend, 1st Marquess Townshend
- Issue: Lord William Townshend; Lord James Townshend; Lady Anne Townshend; Charlotte Osborne, Duchess of Leeds; Lady Honoria Townshend; Lady Honoria Townshend
- Father: Sir William Montgomery, 1st Baronet
- Mother: Hannah Tomkins
- Occupation: Mistress of the Robes to Caroline of Brunswick

Anne Townshend, Marchioness Townshend (c. 1752 – 29 March 1819), formerly Anne Montgomery, was a British courtier. She was the second wife of George Townshend, 1st Marquess Townshend, previously Viscount Townshend.

She was the daughter of Sir William Montgomery, 1st Baronet (1717–1788), and his first wife, Hannah. Her only brother William died in 1777, while on active service during the American War of Independence, and her half-brother George inherited the baronetcy. The family seat was at Macbie Hill, Peebles, Scotland.

Anne Montgomery married the viscount on 19 May 1773. He already had three children by his first wife, who died in 1770. With Anne, he had a further six children:

- Lord William Townshend (1778–1794)
- Captain Lord James Nugent Boyle Bernardo Townshend (11 September 1785 – 28 June 1842)
- Lady Anne Townshend (died 29 November 1826)
- Lady Charlotte Townshend (16 March 1776 – 30 July 1856), who married George Osborne, 6th Duke of Leeds
- Lady Honoria Townshend (1777–1826)
- Lady Henrietta Townshend (died 9 November 1848)

In 1787, Anne's husband was created 1st Marquess Townshend. The Marchioness was officially Mistress of the Robes to Caroline, Princess of Wales, from 1795 to 1808. In 1801 she commissioned the dual Portrait of Caroline, Princess of Wales and Princess Charlotte from the artist Thomas Lawrence.

Her portrait (1780), by Sir Joshua Reynolds, is held by the National Portrait Gallery. She is also one of the sitters in Reynolds' A Sacrifice to Hymen (1773), along with her sisters Elizabeth Gardiner, Viscountess Mountjoy and Barbara.
