= George Laking (footballer) =

English footballer

Personal information
- Full name: George Edward Laking
- Date of birth: 17 March 1913
- Place of birth: Harthill, South Yorkshire, England
- Date of death: 1 June 1997 (aged 84)
- Place of death: Codsall, Staffordshire
- Height: 5 ft 9 in (1.75 m)
- Position: Defender

Senior career*
Years	Team	Apps	(Gls)
- Kiveton Park
- Dinnington
1934–1936	Wolverhamption Wanderers		
1936–1947	Middlesbrough		
1941–1942	→ Sheffield Wednesday (guest)		
1942	→ Sheffield United (guest)		
1942–1944	→ Doncaster Rovers (guest)		
1945	→ Leeds United (guest)		
1947–1949	Shrewsbury Town		
- * Club domestic league appearances and goals

George Edward Laking (17 March 1913 – June 1997) was an English footballer who played in the Football League for Wolverhampton Wanderers and Middlesbrough. Born in Harthill (near Rotherham), England he also played for a number of clubs in non-league and guested for several other clubs during World War II.

== Football career ==
Laking began his football career with Kiveton Park and later Dinnington, before being signed by Wolverhampton Wanderers in May 1934. Having made his Football League debut on 9 November 1935 against Grimsby Town, Laking spent just over a season with the West Midlands club before being signed by Middlesbrough in October 1936. Establishing himself as the club's first choice right back, Laking was ever present during the 1937–38 season, but lost his place the following year and eventually converted to play at left back.

Laking guested for a number of Yorkshire clubs during the Second World War; Sheffield Wednesday, Sheffield United, Doncaster Rovers and Leeds United, before returning to league football with Middlesbrough following the end of the conflict. Laking was now unable hold down a first team place, appearing just once more for 'Boro in 1936, and transferred to non-league Shrewsbury Town in the summer of 1947 where he remained until retiring two years later.

== Outside football ==
Laking was also adept at cricket and played for Shropshire in seasons of 1957 and 1958 while playing for the Shrewsbury-based Rolls-Royce Cricket Club.
