= Thomas Wright (engraver) =

English engraver and portrait-painter

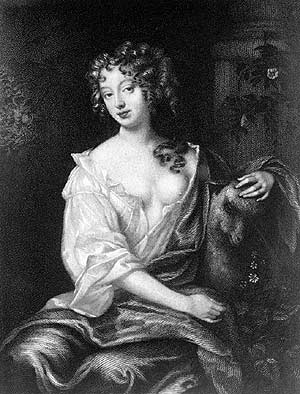
Nell Gwyn, after a painting by Peter Lely (1618–1680)

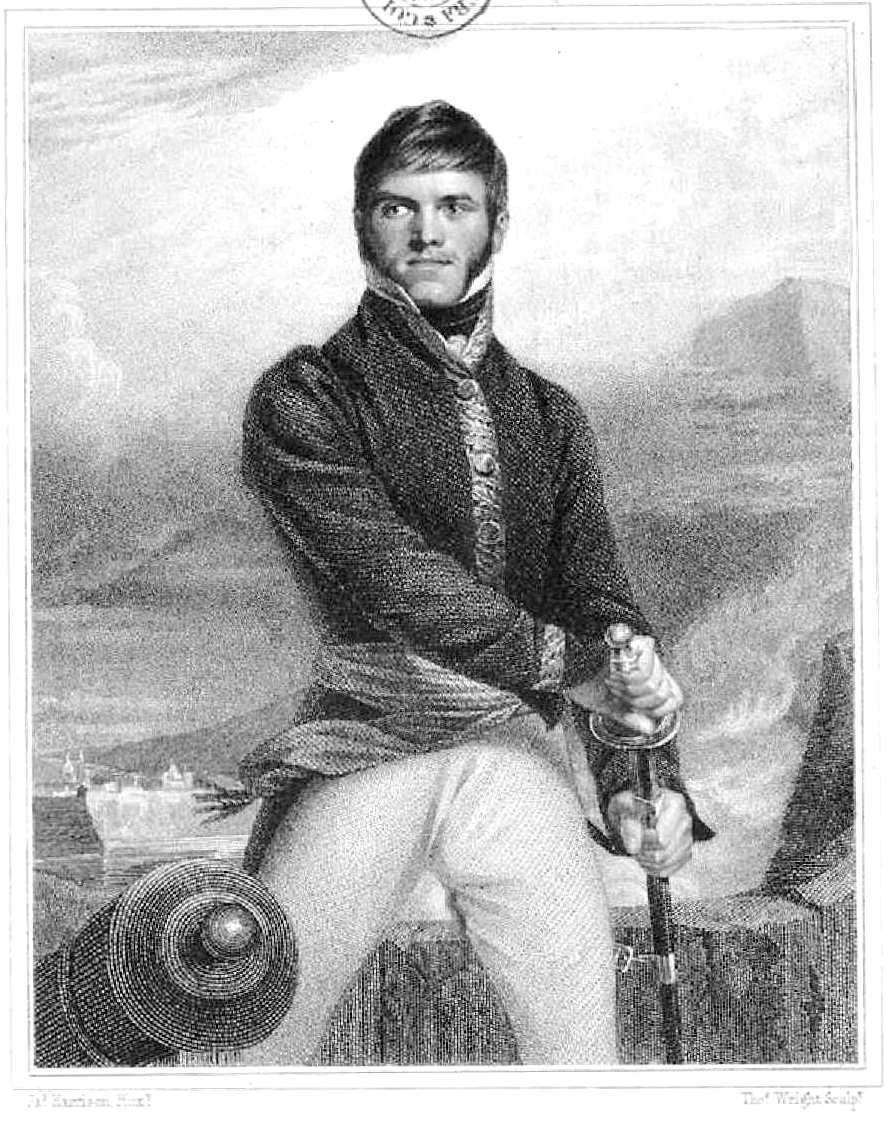
General Javier Mina (1789–1817).

Thomas Wright (2 March 1792, Birmingham – 30 March 1849, London) was an English engraver and portrait-painter.

== Biography ==
He served as an apprentice to Henry Meyer, and worked for four years as assistant to William Thomas Fry, for whom he engraved the popular plate of Princess Charlotte and Prince Leopold in a box at Covent Garden Theatre. About 1817 he began to practise independently as a stipple-engraver, and also found employment in taking portraits in pencil and miniature.

He became much associated with George Dawe, whose sister he married, and in 1822 followed him to St. Petersburg to engrave his gallery of portraits of Russian generals; there he also executed a fine plate of the Emperor Alexander, and another of the Empress Alexandra with her children, both after Dawe, on account of which he received diamond rings from members of the royal family and a gold medal from the king of Prussia.

Wright returned to England in 1826, and during the next four years was employed upon the plates to Mrs. Jameson's ‘Beauties of the Court of Charles II,’ which constitute his best work; also upon some of the plates to the folio edition of Edmund Lodge's ‘Portraits.’ In 1830 he again went to Russia, and remained for fifteen years, working under the patronage of the court. There he published a series of portraits entitled ‘Les Contemporains Russes,’ drawn and engraved by himself. On finally leaving St. Petersburg Wright presented a complete collection of impressions from his plates, numbering about 300, to the Hermitage Gallery. He was a member of the academies of St. Petersburg, Florence, and Stockholm.

== Works ==
Wright contributed engravings to:

- Mrs. Jameson (Anna), The beauties of the court of Charles the Second: a series of portraits, illustrating the diaries of Pepys, Evelyn, Clarendon, and other contemporary writers, Publisher H. Colburn by R. Bentley, 1833.

== Sources ==
- Freeman Marius O'Donoghue (1900). "Wright, Thomas (1792-1849)" . In Lee, Sidney (ed.). Dictionary of National Biography. Vol. 63. London: Smith, Elder & Co.
- Michael Bryan, Bryan's Dictionary of Painters and Engravers. Volume 5. S-Z, Publisher Elibron.com, ISBN 0543931579, 9780543931573. Reproduction first published in 1921, page 398
- A Dictionary of Artists of the English School, by Samuel Redgrave, G. Bell & Sons, 1878
- Obituary in The Gentleman's Magazine, 1849, Vol.211
- Obituary in The Athenæum, 1849
