= Listed buildings in Harthill with Woodall =

Harthill with Woodall is a civil parish in the Metropolitan Borough of Rotherham, South Yorkshire, England. The parish contains twelve listed buildings that are recorded in the National Heritage List for England. Of these, one is listed at Grade I, the highest of the three grades, one is at Grade II*, the middle grade, and the others are at Grade II, the lowest grade. The parish contains the villages of Harthill and Woodall and the surrounding countryside. The Chesterfield Canal passes through the periphery of the parish, and two bridges crossing it are listed. Most of the other listed buildings are houses and farmhouses, the rest including a church, a former threshing barn, the possible base of a medieval cross, a war memorial and a schoolhouse.

== Key ==
Grade	Criteria
I	Buildings of exceptional interest, sometimes considered to be internationally important
II*	Particularly important buildings of more than special interest
II	Buildings of national importance and special interest

== Buildings ==
Name and location	Photograph	Date	Notes	Grade
All Hallows' Church, Harthill; 53.32330°N 1.26031°W		c. 1200	The church was altered and extended through the centuries, mainly in the 15th century, and the chancel was restored in 1897–98. The exterior is largely in Perpendicular style with embattled parapets. The church is built in sandstone with lead roofs, and consists of a nave with a clerestory, north and south aisles, a south porch, a chancel with a south chapel and a north vestry and organ chamber, and a west tower. The tower has angle buttresses, a three-light west window with a pointed arch and a hood mould, string courses, a west clock face, gargoyles on the north and south side, and an embattled parapet with crocketed pinnacles.	I
4 Walseker Lane, Woodall; 53.32161°N 1.27672°W	—	Late medieval	A farmhouse with a timber framed core, encased in sandstone in the 17th or 18th century, with quoins, and a pantile roof, hipped on the right. There are two storeys, five bays, and a rear outshut, and the building contains doorways and casement windows. Some internal timber framing remains.	II*
Tiered stone steps 53.32241°N 1.26025°W	—	16th or 17th century (probable)	The steps are in sandstone and are possibly the base of a cross. They have a rectangular plan, with three tiers, and are built into a garden wall at the rear.	II
Former threshing barn 53.32016°N 1.25992°W		Late 17th century	The threshing barn, later converted into a shop, is in stone with a pantile roof. There are four bays, and a two-bay aisle on the north side. The barn contains threshing doors, vents, windows, a loft door, and an inserted doorway and shop window.	II
The Old Rectory; 53.32287°N 1.26009°W		c. 1716	The house is in sandstone on a plinth, with quoins, a floor band, an eaves cornice, decorative iron gutter brackets, and a hipped Westmorland slate roof. There are two storeys and attics, a front of five bays, two bays on the sides, and a rear extension. The central doorway has a moulded surround, a fanlight, and a segmental pediment. The windows are sashes and in the roof are three dormers with pediments, the central one segmental and the outer ones triangular. In the rear extension is a stair window, the right return contains a canted bay window, and in the left return is an original mullioned cross window.	II
Harthill Schoolhouse; 53.32313°N 1.25974°W		1721	The schoolhouse is in the churchyard of All Hallows' Church. It is in sandstone on a plinth, with quoins and a hipped Welsh slate roof. There is one storey and three bays, the middle bay projecting under a coped gable with kneelers, containing an oculus with an architrave. The central doorway has a moulded surround, a fanlight, and a cornice with a rusticated panel above. It is flanked by casement windows, in the outer bays are cross windows, and at the rear is a central lean-to.	II
44 Union Street, Harthill; 53.32242°N 1.26058°W	—	Mid to late 18th century	A house with a wing added later, it is rendered, with chamfered quoins, a sill band, boxed eaves, and a tile roof. There are two storeys, three bays, and a rear wing in the centre. The central doorway has an architrave, a frieze and a cornice, and the windows are sashes with architraves and aprons.	II
Danby House; 53.32141°N 1.26034°W	—	Mid to late 18th century	The farmhouse is in sandstone on a rendered plinth, with quoins and a pantile roof. There are three storeys and three bays. The central doorway has a cornice, and the windows are modern, those in the lower two floors with wedge lintels, and those in the top floor with keystones.	II
Glebe Farmhouse; 53.32347°N 1.25935°W	—	Mid to late 18th century	A sandstone farmhouse with quoins, and a pantile roof with a coped gable and shaped kneelers on the left. There are two storeys, three bays, and a rear wing on the right. The doorway has a cornice, and the windows are horizontally-sliding sashes with the former mullions removed.	II
Dog Kennels Bridge, Chesterfield Canal; 53.33652°N 1.23891°W		1811 or 1841	A roving bridge that carries Packman Lane over the canal. It is in limestone with a brick soffit, and consists of a single chamfered segmental arch with a keystone and a dated ledge. The abutment walls sweep round to form the retaining walls of footpaths, the northwest wall ending in a pier. The parapet has rounded copings, and has been partly rebuilt in blue brick.	II
Norwood Bridge, Chesterfield Canal; 53.33220°N 1.29756°W		1833	The bridge that carries a track over the canal is mainly in red brick, with stone abutment walls, voussoirs, and copings. It consists of a single chamfered segmental arch with quoined jambs, projecting springing stones, and a dated keystone under a moulded ledge. The wing walls curve out and end in piers.	II
Harthill war memorial 53.32282°N 1.26046°W		1920	The war memorial stands in an enclosure by the roadside, and consists of a floriated Latin cross in Portland stone. It has an octagonal shaft with bands, on a moulded plinth. This stands on an octagonal pedestal with tracery carving in relief, and a moulded cap and plinth, on three octagonal steps. The enclosure has a limestone kerb with low cast iron railings. On the wall at the rear are two stone plaques with inscriptions and the names of those lost in the two World Wars.	II
