= Woodall, South Yorkshire =

Hamlet in South Yorkshire, England

Coordinates: 53.321039°N 1.277879°W

Woodall
- Hamlet
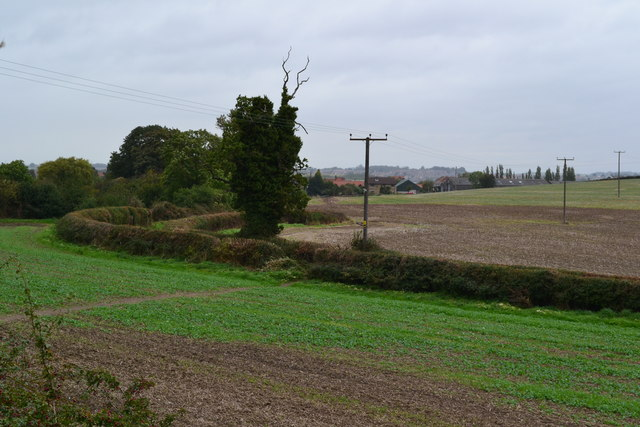
- View towards Woodall from the southwest (2012)

- Location within South Yorkshire
- OS grid reference: SK482807
- Civil parish: Harthill with Woodall
- Metropolitan borough: Rotherham
- Metropolitan county: South Yorkshire
- Region: Yorkshire and the Humber
- Country: England
- Sovereign state: United Kingdom
- Post town: SHEFFIELD
- Postcode district: S26
- Dialling code: 01909
- Police: South Yorkshire
- Fire: South Yorkshire
- Ambulance: Yorkshire
- UK Parliament: Rother Valley

Woodall is a small hamlet in the civil parish of Harthill with Woodall situated in the Metropolitan Borough of Rotherham, South Yorkshire England. In the 2001 government census the parish as a whole had 1,909 inhabitants. It is home to a Welcome Break service station of the same name.

== History ==
A once tiny settlement consisting of but a few farms and barn buildings, over the 20th and 21st centuries the hamlet grew substantially and consequently is now a quiet residential area popular with commuters to the nearby town of Rotherham and the city of Sheffield. The growth was in part due to the opening of Kiveton Park coal pit in 1864, the slag heap of which can still clearly be seen to the North-East of the hamlet. The hamlet consists of two lanes, Dowcarr to the South and Walseker to the North, straddling the link road from High Moor, Killamarsh, to Harthill called Woodall Lane (occasionally Killamarsh Lane).

== Amenities ==
The hamlet has no amenities such as shops or pubs, instead inhabitants rely on the village of Harthill approximately one mile away, which has two pubs, a church, a junior school and a shopping precinct. Woodall does have several popular walks nearby including several through the local wood, Norwood, towards the village of Killamarsh and around the several ponds within the wood itself. With the village situated on a slight ridge the inhabitants also enjoy fantastic views over Sheffield (c.10–15 miles away) and to the hills of the Peak District beyond.

== Woodall services ==
Woodall is perhaps most famous for its motorway service area on the M1 motorway (Woodall services) and the hamlet itself is less than one mile from the carriageway.

== Trivia ==
Justin Wilson (racing driver), the late Formula 1, ChampCar and IndyCar driver, came from Woodall. It was allegedly hit by a V-2 rocket (most likely heading towards the steel factories of Sheffield) in the Second World War. A crater can be seen on a nearby hill, however reports are sketchy at best and must be viewed with some degree of scepticism.

== See also ==
- Listed buildings in Harthill with Woodall
