= Charlotte Osborne, Duchess of Leeds =

English noblewoman (1776–1856)

Her Grace The Duchess of Leeds
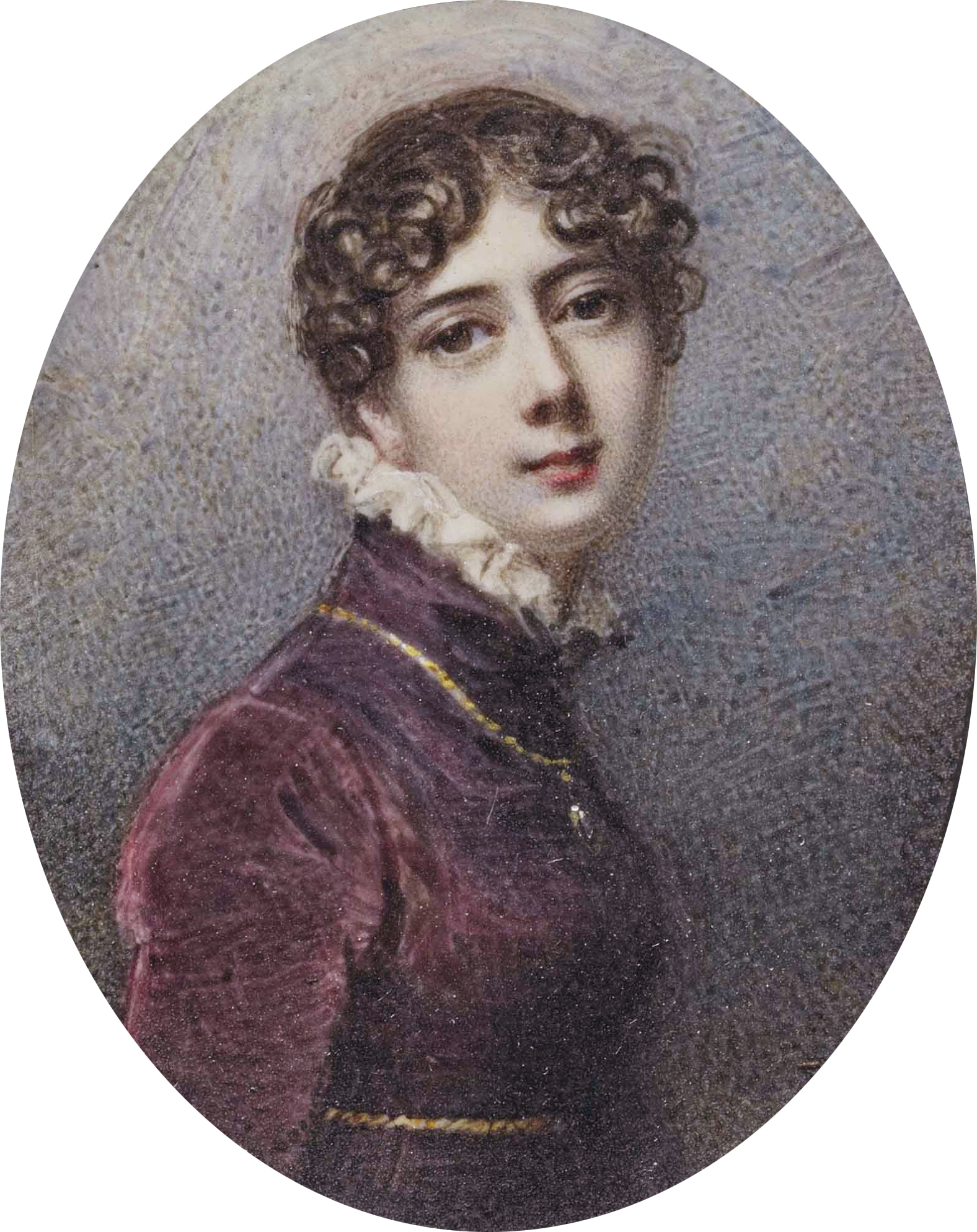
- Charlotte, Duchess of Leeds, by Anne Mee

Duchess consort of Leeds
- Tenure: 1799 - 1838
- Born: Lady Charlotte Townshend; 16 March 1776
- Died: 30 July 1856 (aged 80)
- Noble family: Townshend
- Spouse: George Osborne, 6th Duke of Leeds
- Issue: Francis D'Arcy-Osborne, 7th Duke of Leeds; Lady Charlotte Mary Anne Georgiana Osborne; Lord Conyers George Thomas William Osborne
- Father: George Townshend, 1st Marquess Townshend
- Mother: Anne Montgomery

Charlotte Osborne, Duchess of Leeds (16 March 1776 – 30 July 1856), formerly Lady Charlotte Townshend, was the wife of George Osborne, 6th Duke of Leeds.

She was the daughter of George Townshend, 1st Marquess Townshend, by his second wife, the former Anne Montgomery.

== Personal life ==
On 17 August 1797, Osborne married the duke, then Marquess of Carmarthen, at East Raynham in Norfolk In 1799 Osborne's husband became duke, and therefore, she became a duchess. They had three children:

- Francis Godolphin Osborne, 7th Duke of Leeds (1798–1859), who married Louisa Catherine Caton and had children.
- Lady Charlotte Mary Anne Georgiana Osborne (c. 1806–1836), who married Sackville Lane-Fox and had children.
- Lord Conyers George Thomas William Osborne (1812–1831)

The Duke of Leeds died in 1838, aged 62, to be succeeded by their son, Francis. The Duchess of Leeds died in July 1856, aged 80.

== Arms ==
Coat of arms of Charlotte Osborne, Duchess of Leeds
Escutcheon George Osborne, 6th Duke of Leeds (Quarterly 1st & 4th Ermine & Azure a cross Or 2nd Gules an eagle displayed between three fleurs-de-lis two and one Argent 3rd Sable a lion rampant Argent on a canton Argent a cross Gules) impaling George Townshend, 1st Marquess Townshend (Azure a chevron Ermine between three escallops Argent). Supporters Dexter a griffin Or sinister an heraldic tiger Argent both ducally gorged Azure.
