= John Foldsone =

English painter

John Foldsone (died 1784) was an English portrait painter.

== Life ==
Foldsone gained a reputation as a painter of small portraits, which were described by Edward Edwards as "of no great merit, but with sufficient likeness to procure much employment at a small price". He worked very quickly, arriving at his sitters homes in the morning, dining with them if they lived at a distance, and finishing his work before evening.

Foldsone lived in London, in Little Castle Street, and later in Newman Street. He exhibited at the Society of Artists in 1769 and 1770, and then at the Royal Academy from 1771 to 1783. As well as portraits, the works he showed at the Academy included a Madonna and mythological subjects.

His pair of portraits showing Elizabeth Haffey, and her brother, John Burges Haffey, as children, were engraved in mezzotint by Robert Laurie, and his picture Female Lucubration, was reproduced in the same technique by Philip Dawe.

He died in 1784, leaving a wife and children; the miniature painter Anne Mee was his eldest daughter.
