= All Hallows' Church, Harthill =

Anglican church in South Yorkshire, England

Coordinates: 53°19′23.8″N 1°15′37.5″W

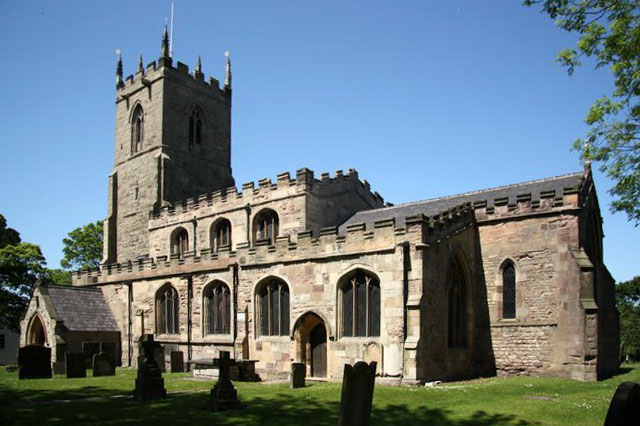
All Hallows Church, Harthill, South Yorkshire

The All Hallows Church is an Anglican parish church in the Diocese of Sheffield, located in Harthill, South Yorkshire, England. It is a Grade I listed building.

== History ==
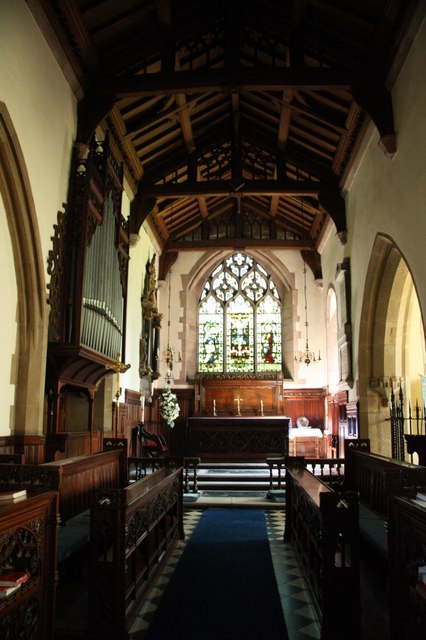
All Hallows, chancel

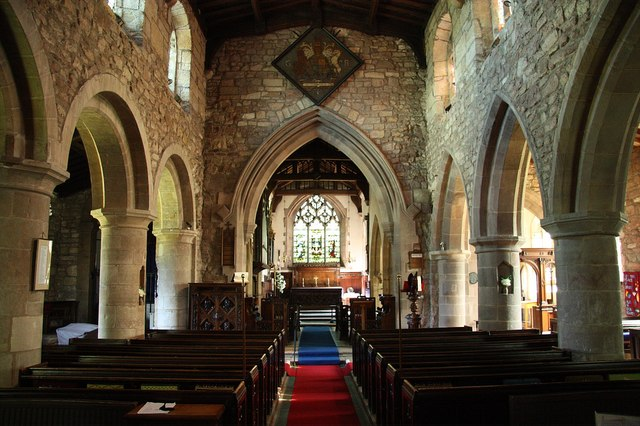
All Hallows, nave

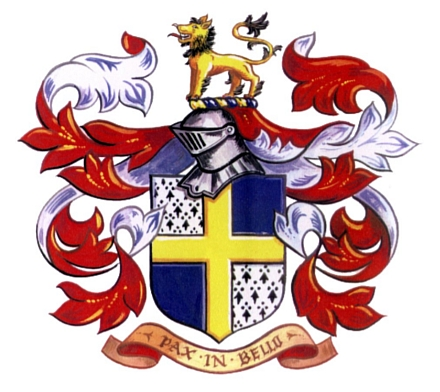
Ancestral arms of the Osborne family, Dukes of Leeds

All Hallows Church was commissioned by William de Warenne, son-in-law of William the Conqueror, circa 1080 AD. William de Warenne was granted vast land holdings for his part in the Norman invasion, including Harthill manor.

The tower of the church is mainly 15th century, but the nave arcades were built when the Norman style was passing. The old font has a Jacobean cover, there is a fine old chest, and the modern woodwork is richly carved.

The tower originally contained eight bells. Over the centuries, two bells were lost. According to Garbutt's 1950 history, the six remaining bells were dated from 1660 to 1889. They were replaced by the current set in 1937.

In 1999, the church was valued at £1.25 million for insurance purposes, compared to £689 in 1831.

The historical inscriptions inside All Hallows Church have been transcribed (see here dead link).

== Osborne family tombs ==
=== Mortuary chapel and vault ===
All Hallows Church is the traditional burial place of the Dukes of Leeds from the Osborne family. They lived at Kiveton Hall nearby. After Kiveton Hall was demolished in 1811, Hornby Castle became the main seat of the Dukes of Leeds.

Thomas Osborne, 1st Duke of Leeds (1632–1712) purchased the Harthill estate while Earl of Danby, and had a fine mortuary chapel built in the north-east corner of All Hallows Church. A description of the chapel was printed in the Leeds Mercury in 1900: "The huge tomb of the first Duke, with its highly polished black marble top, blocks up the entrance to this chapel. Over it, in semi darkness, hangs a dusky display of armour, a very beautiful shield is embossed metal, some faded banners, and a Civil War standard. The almost concealed window contains shields exhibiting the marriages of his large family, executed in painted glass by W. Price in 1705." The statue of Lady Margaret Osborne (née Belasyse, who died comfortably in 1624) kneels at a desk with one child behind her and another in swaddling clothes. She was the daughter of Thomas Belasyse, 1st Viscount Fauconberg and first wife of Sir Edward Osborne, 1st Baronet.

Beneath the chapel is the Osborne family vault, described in the Leeds Mercury in 1900 as "Eleven steps lead down through an iron flap-door to the Ducal vault beneath the mortuary chapel. Here sleep the first Duke's descendants - seven successive Dukes, several Duchesses, and other members of the family. Twenty four coffins, most of them retaining their red plush covering, brass-head nails, and sheet-brass coronets, are laid on the stone-wall bench and an iron table. The last internment was that of the 7th Duchess. There is some talk of walling the vault up permanently."

=== Notable monuments and burials ===
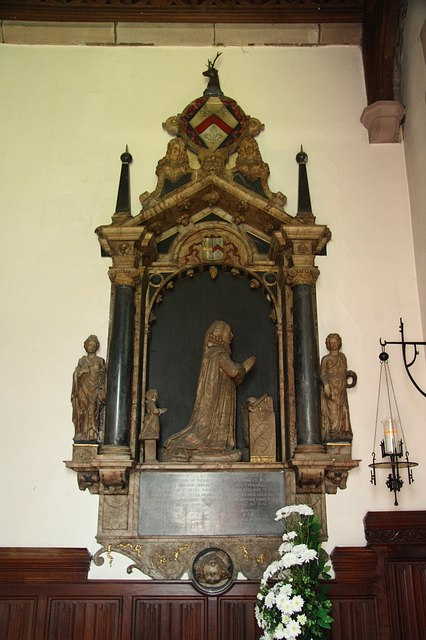
Monument to Lady Margaret Osborne (née Belasyse, died 1624)

Members of the Osborne family buried in All Hallows Church include:

- Margaret (née Belasyse), wife of the 1st Baronet (died 7 November 1624)
- Sir Edward Osborne, 1st Baronet (1596–1647)
- Thomas Osborne, 1st Duke of Leeds (1632–1712)
- Peregrine Osborne, 2nd Duke of Leeds (1659–1729)
- Peregrine Osborne, 3rd Duke of Leeds (1691–1731)
- Thomas Osborne, 4th Duke of Leeds (1713–1789)
- Francis Osborne, 5th Duke of Leeds (1751–1799)
- George Osborne, 6th Duke of Leeds (1775–1838)
- Francis D'Arcy-Osborne, 7th Duke of Leeds (1798–1859)
- George Osborne, 8th Duke of Leeds (1802–1872)
- Louisa Catharine (née Caton), wife of the 7th Duke (died 8 April 1874)

The 12th and last Duke of Leeds (1884–1964) is buried in the Protestant Cemetery, Rome.

== Churchyard ==
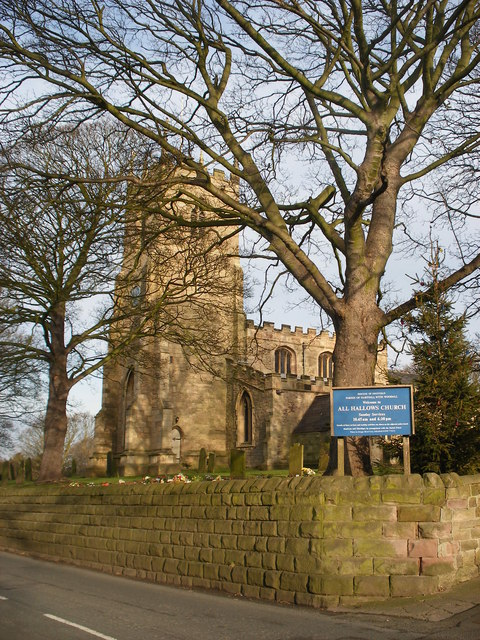
All Hallows, as seen from the churchyard

All Hallows Church is surrounded by a large churchyard. The historical inscriptions in the churchyard have been transcribed (see here). A plan of the Harthill All Hallows graveyard can be viewed here.

== See also ==
- Grade I listed buildings in South Yorkshire
- Listed buildings in Harthill with Woodall
