= George Townshend, 2nd Marquess Townshend =

British peer and politician

The Most Honourable The Marquess Townshend PC FRS
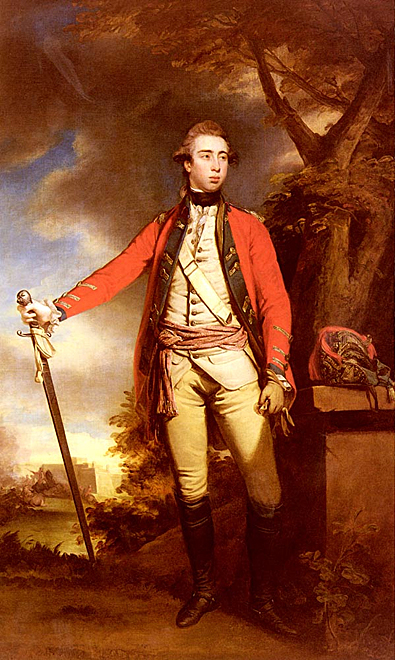
- Lord Townshend by Sir Joshua Reynolds.

Lord Steward of the Household
- In office 1799–1802
- Monarch: George III
- Prime Minister: William Pitt the Younger; Henry Addington
- Preceded by: The Duke of Dorset
- Succeeded by: The Earl of Dartmouth

Personal details
- Born: George Townshend; 18 April 1753
- Died: 27 July 1811 (aged 58)
- Spouse: Charlotte Mainwaring-Ellerker (m. 1777; died 1802)
- Children: 5, including George and Charles
- Education: St John's College, Cambridge

George Townshend, 2nd Marquess Townshend, PC, FRS (18 April 1753 – 27 July 1811), known as The Lord Ferrers of Chartley from 1770 to 1784 and as The Earl of Leicester from 1784 to 1807, was a British peer and politician.

== Background and education ==
Townshend was the eldest son of George Townshend, 1st Marquess Townshend, by his first wife Charlotte Compton, 16th Baroness Ferrers of Chartley and 7th Baroness Compton. He was the elder brother of Lord John Townshend and Lord Charles Townshend and the nephew of Charles Townshend. He succeeded to the titles held by his mother on her death in 1774 and became known as the Lord Ferrers of Chartley. He was educated at Eton and St John's College, Cambridge, and served for a few years in the Army, achieving the ranks of Cornet, Lieutenant, and finally Captain in 1774.

== Political career ==
Townshend received his writ of summons to the House of Lords in 1774. In March 1782 he was appointed Captain of the Honourable Band of Gentlemen Pensioners, a position he held until May 1783, and again from December 1783 to 1797. He was admitted to the Privy Council in April 1782 and also served as a member of the Committee for Trade from 1784 to 1786. In 1784 he was created Earl of Leicester in his own right. His choice of title derived from the fact that he was a female-line great-great-great-grandson of Lady Lucy Sydney, daughter of Robert Sidney, 2nd Earl of Leicester (a title which had become extinct in 1743). He later held office under William Pitt the Younger and Henry Addington as Master of the Mint from 1790 to 1794, as Joint Postmaster General from 1794 to 1799 and as Lord Steward of the Household from 1799 to 1802. In 1807 he succeeded his father in the marquessate of Townshend.

Apart from his political career, Townshend was interested in archaeology and served as President of the Society of Antiquaries. He was also a Fellow of the Royal Society and a Trustee of the British Museum.

== Family ==
Ellerker's Estate Act 1750
- Act of Parliament
- Parliament of Great Britain
- Long title: An Act for the effectual securing of a Jointure, by Way of Rent Charge, for Barbara Mainwaring Ellerker, Wife of Eaton Mainworing Ellerker Esquire, and raising Portions for then Younger Children, pursuant to an Agreement contained in then Marriage Settlement, and for confirming and establishing the Surname of Ellerker, and the Coat of Arms of the Ellerkers of Risby, in the County of York, and the Crest granted by King Henry the Eighth, to the said Laton Mainwaring Ellerker and his Issue.
- Citation: 24 Geo. 2. c. 17 Pr.
- Territorial extent: Great Britain

Dates
- Royal assent: 22 May 1751
- Commencement: 17 January 1751 (Note: Start of session.)

Status: Current legislation

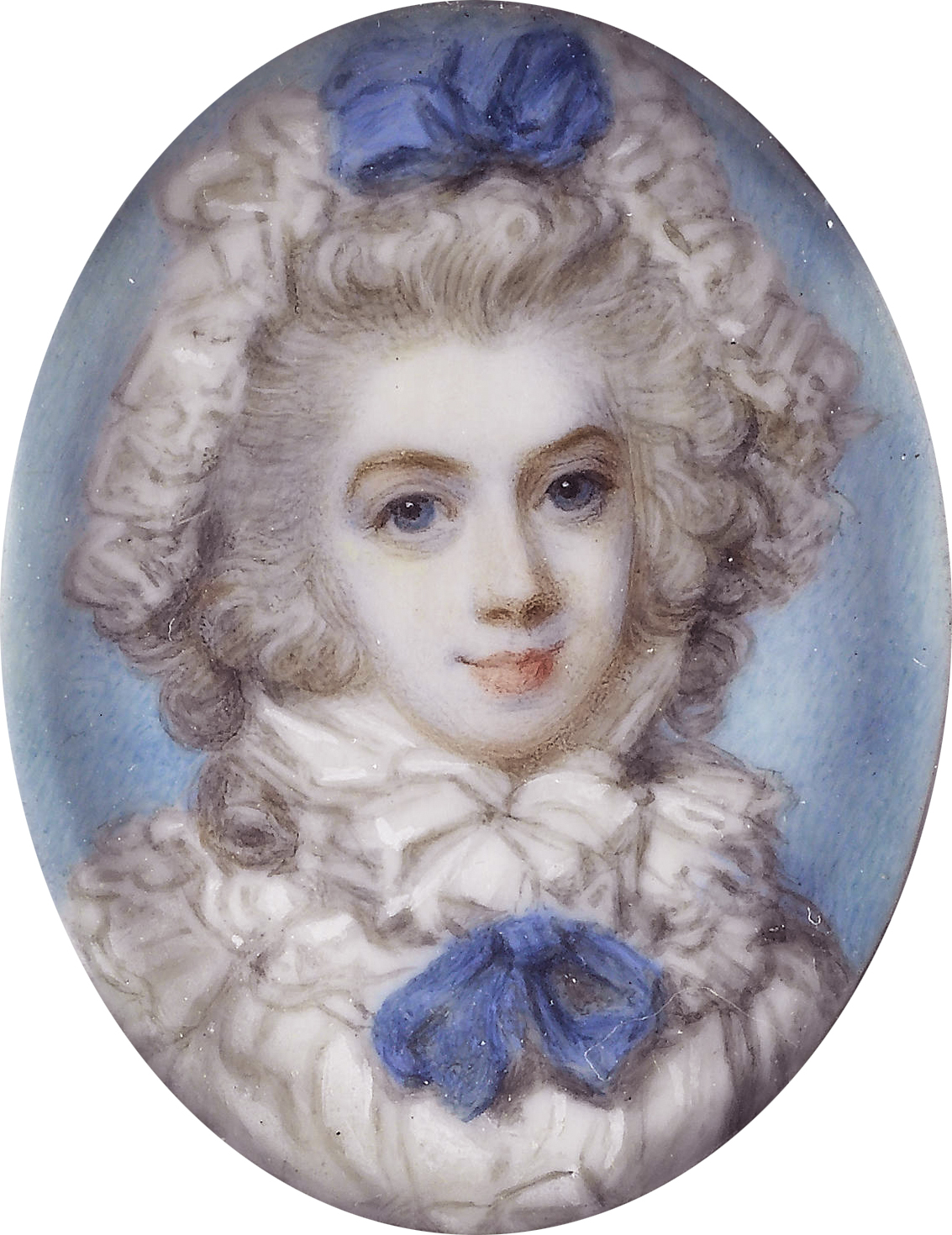
Charlotte, Baroness de Ferrers, later Countess of Leicester, by Richard Cosway

Lord Townshend married Charlotte, daughter of Eaton Mainwaring-Ellerker, on 24 December 1777, who had adopted the name and arms of Ellerker by a private act of Parliament, Ellerker's Estate Act 1750 (24 Geo. 2. c. 17 Pr.). They had two sons, George and Lord Charles, both of whom died childless, and three daughters. She died in February 1802. Lord Townshend died suddenly in July 1811, aged 58, and was succeeded in his titles by his eldest son George, who had previously been disinherited. On the latter's death in 1855 the earldom of Leicester became extinct while the marquessate passed to his cousin John Townshend, son of Lord John Townshend of Balls Park.

== Arms ==
Coat of arms of George Townshend, 2nd Marquess Townshend
Crest A stag statant proper, attired and unguled or. Escutcheon Quarterly, 1st and 4th, Azure, a chevron ermine between three escallops argent (Townshend); 2nd and 3rd, quarterly gules and or, in the first quarter a mullet argent, in the centre a crescent sable (Vere). Supporters Dexter, A stag sable, attired and unguled or; Sinister, A greyhound argent. Motto Hæc generi incrementa fides (Faith obtained these honours for our race’). Other versions The arms are also shown without the Vere quarters.

== Notes ==
Political offices
Preceded by The Viscount Mount Edgcumbe and Valletort	Captain of the Honourable Band of Gentlemen Pensioners; 1782–1783	Succeeded by The Earl of Jersey
Preceded by The Earl of Jersey	Captain of the Honourable Band of Gentlemen Pensioners; 1783–1790	Succeeded by The Viscount Falmouth
Preceded by The Earl of Chesterfield	Master of the Mint; 1790–1794	Succeeded by Sir George Yonge
Preceded by The Earl of Chesterfield; The Lord Walsingham	Joint Postmaster-General with The Earl of Chesterfield 1794–1799; The Lord Auckland 1798–1799; 1794–1799	Succeeded by The Lord Auckland; Earl Gower
Preceded by The Duke of Dorset	Lord Steward of the Household; 1799–1802	Succeeded by The Earl of Dartmouth
Peerage of Great Britain
Preceded by George Townshend	Marquess Townshend; 1807–1811	Succeeded by George Ferrers Townshend
New creation	Earl of Leicester; 6th creation 1784–1811	Succeeded by George Ferrers Townshend
Peerage of England
Preceded by Charlotte Townshend	Baron Ferrers of Chartley; 1770–1811	Succeeded by George Ferrers Townshend
