= Harthill, South Yorkshire =

Village in South Yorkshire, England

Harthill
- Village
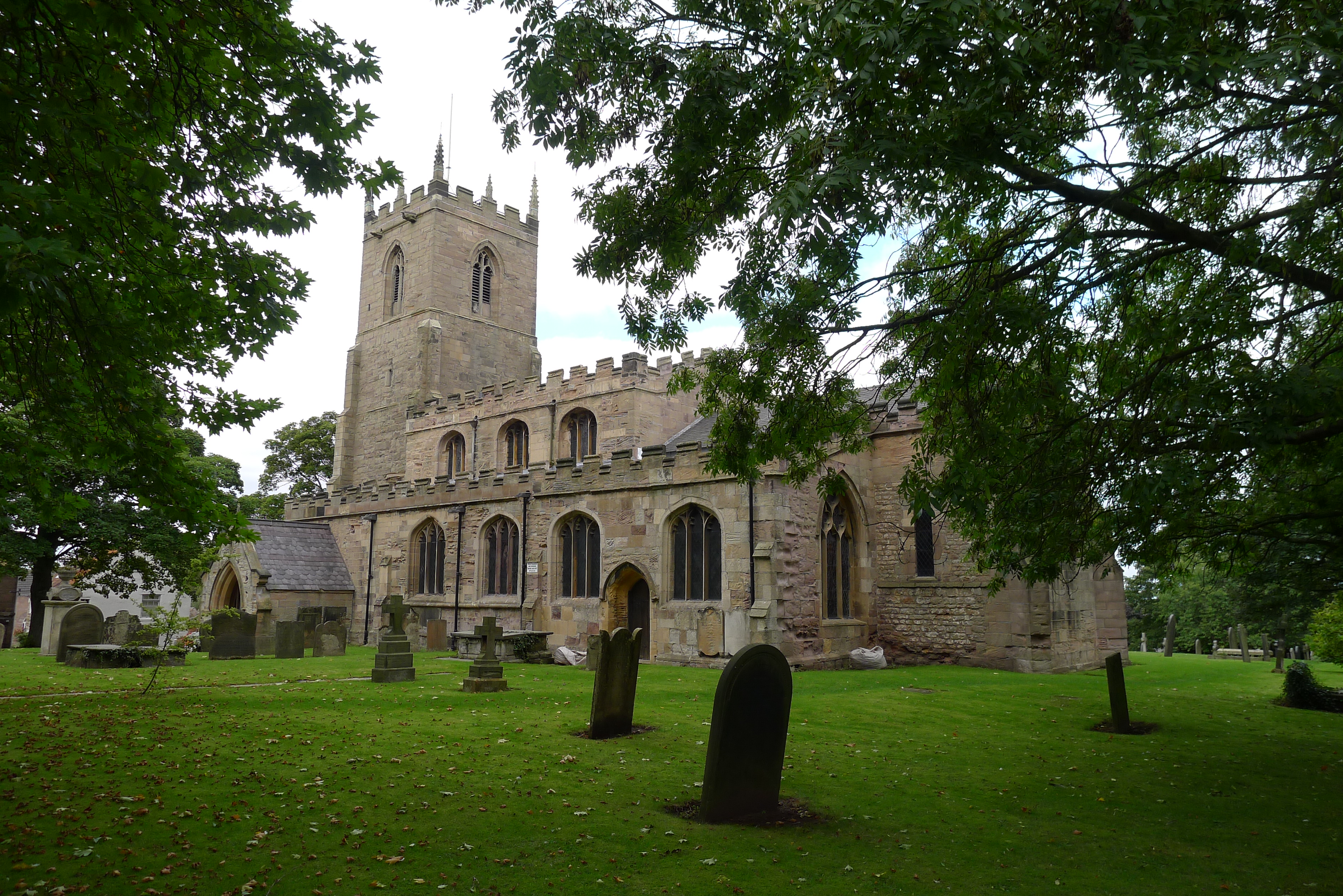
- All Hallows Church

- Location within South Yorkshire
- Population: 1,879 (2011)
- OS grid reference: SK493807
- Civil parish: Harthill with Woodall
- Metropolitan borough: Rotherham
- Metropolitan county: South Yorkshire
- Region: Yorkshire and the Humber
- Country: England
- Sovereign state: United Kingdom
- Post town: SHEFFIELD
- Postcode district: S26
- Dialling code: 01909
- Police: South Yorkshire
- Fire: South Yorkshire
- Ambulance: Yorkshire
- UK Parliament: Rother Valley

Harthill is a village in the Metropolitan Borough of Rotherham (part of South Yorkshire, England), on the border with Derbyshire. It lies between Killamarsh and Thorpe Salvin, and is located at approximately 53°19′10″N 1°15′30″W, at an elevation of around 110 metres above sea level. In the 2001 census, the civil parish of Harthill with Woodall had a population of 1,909, reducing slightly to 1,879 at the 2011 Census.

== History ==
The name Harthill derives from the Old English heorothyll literally meaning 'hart hill'.

Harthill is traditionally an agricultural village, although there is also a history of quarrying whetstones for use in knife-sharpening.

The parish church of All Hallows dates from 1085, when it was commissioned by William de Warenne. The tower is 14th century. The Dukes of Leeds, major landowners in the area, and their families, are interred in the crypt.

Harthill is the principal village in the civil parish of Harthill with Woodall. The parish also contains Harthill Reservoir, which feeds the Chesterfield Canal, Nor Wood, and the hamlet of Woodall with its M1 motorway service station. The reservoir was constructed in 1796 and in 2020 the Canals and Rivers Trust announced a £5 million programme of works to upgrade the overflow spillway of the earth dam. The reservoir provides leisure facilities for Rotherham Sailing Club, Yorkshire Outdoor Swimmers and fishing.

== Amenities ==
Harthill has two public houses: the Beehive and the Blue Bell.

== Transport ==
The village is served by several public transport routes. First South Yorkshire operate the hourly service X54 to Sheffield from Monday to Saturday, with TM Travel operating it on Sundays. First also run service 29 to Rotherham between Monday and Saturday, with TM Travel operating service 29a on evenings and Sundays. Stagecoach also operate the circular route 26/26a during Monday to Saturday daytime, connecting Harthill with Crystal Peaks. There is also a 1-a-day service to the Hallamshire Hospital in the form of service X30; this is run by TM Travel, Monday to Saturday at 7 am.

== Exploratory drilling rig ==
At a planning appeal in June 2018, the inspector (appointed by the Secretary of State for Communities and Local Government) granted planning permission for exploration at Harthill by means of

construction of a well site and the creation of a new access track, mobilisation of drilling, ancillary equipment and contractor welfare facilities to drill and pressure transient test a vertical hydrocarbon exploratory core well and mobilisation of a workover rig, listening well operations, and retention of the site and wellhead assembly gear for a temporary period of 5 years.

It was explained during the enquiry that the currently authorized investigative well would not involve 'fracking'.

Within the appellant’s evidence and during the Inquiry, it was clearly explained that the development would not include the hydraulic fracturing of underground strata as part of the investigation. The pressure applied during the transient testing proposed would be less than that required to hydraulically fracture the strata, and there would be no injection of sand or gas extraction. The other investigation processes within the development would involve the taking of samples and non-intrusive testing.

== See also ==
- Listed buildings in Harthill with Woodall
