= Lord Charles Townshend (1769–1796) =

British politician (1769–1796)

Lord Charles Patrick Thomas Townshend (6 January 1769 – 27 May 1796) was a British Member of Parliament.

Townshend was the fourth son of Field Marshal George Townshend, 1st Marquess Townshend, and his first wife Charlotte Compton, 16th Baroness Ferrers of Chartley. George Townshend, 2nd Marquess Townshend, and Lord John Townshend were his elder brothers and Charles Townshend his uncle. He was elected to the House of Commons for Great Yarmouth on 25 May 1796. However, only two days later he was murdered by his brother the Reverend Lord Frederick Townshend during a coach journey to London, aged only 27. Lord Frederick was later declared insane.

== See also ==
- Marquess Townshend

Parliament of Great Britain
Preceded by Charles Townshend; Stephens Howe	Member of Parliament for Great Yarmouth; 1796; With: Stephens Howe	Succeeded by William Loftus; Henry Jodrell
