= John Samuel Agar =

English painter

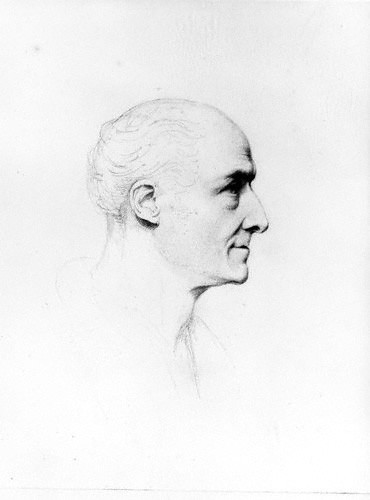
Self-portrait, ca. 1835, Pencil. Now at the National Portrait Gallery

John Samuel Agar (1773–1858) was an English portrait painter and engraver, who exhibited his works at the Royal Academy from 1796 to 1806 and at the British Institution until 1811. He did not exhibit again until 1836. He had been declared bankrupt in February of the previous year.

He was at one time president of the Society of Engravers. His engravings were chiefly in stipple. They include works after Richard and Maria Cosway, and a series of allegories of the months after Edward Francis Burney, published by Rudolf Ackermann in 1807–9. His illustrations for Richard Payne Knight's Specimens of Ancient Sculpture, Aegyptian, Etruscan, Greek and Roman: Selected from different collections in Great Britain (1809), have been described by Nicholas Penny as "the finest ever made of sculpture".
