= Anne Caulfeild, Countess of Charlemont =

Anglo-Irish courtier

The Right Honourable The Countess of Charlemont
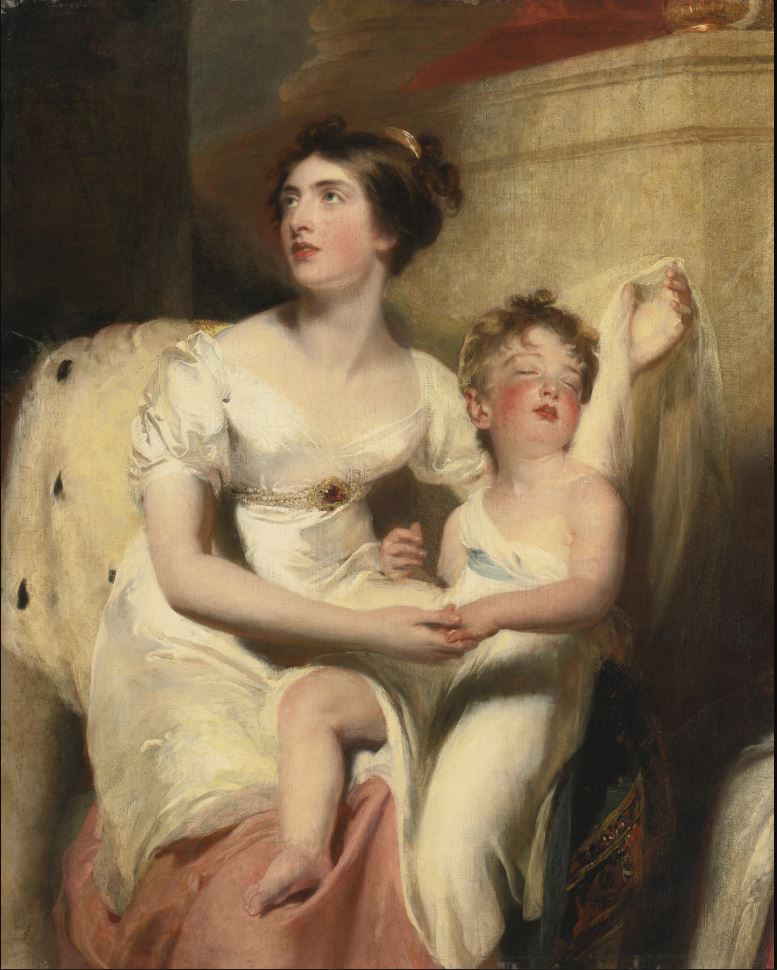
- Anne, Countess of Charlemont and her son James (Thomas Lawrence)
- Born: 1780
- Died: 1876 (aged 95–96)
- Spouse(s): Francis Caulfeild, 2nd Earl of Charlemont
- Father: William Bermingham
- Mother: Mary Ruttledge

Anne Caulfeild, Countess of Charlemont (née Bermingham; 1780–1876) was an Anglo-Irish courtier. She was the first Lady of the Bedchamber appointed by Queen Victoria on her accession, serving in that capacity from 1837–54.

She was a daughter of William Bermingham, Esq., of Ross Hill, Galway and his wife Mary (née Ruttledge). Her sister, Mary (d. 1840), married Nathaniel Clements, 2nd Earl of Leitrim (1768–1854) in 1800. In 1802 she married Francis Caulfeild, 2nd Earl of Charlemont (1775–1863) (formerly 5th Viscount Charlemont), who was notoriously unfaithful to her.

Lady Charlemont supported Effie Gray in the annulment of her marriage to John Ruskin in 1854.

== In art ==
Lady Charlemont was a celebrated beauty in her time. A bust of her as a young woman by Joseph Nollekens was displayed in the corridor of Windsor Castle.

Lord Byron wrote of her in his 'Letter on the Rev. W.L. Bowles's Strictures on Pope' (February 7, 1821): “But always excepting the Venus de Medicis, I differ from that opinion, at least as far as regards female beauty; for the head of Lady Charlemont (when I first saw her nine years ago) seemed to possess all that sculpture required for its ideal.”

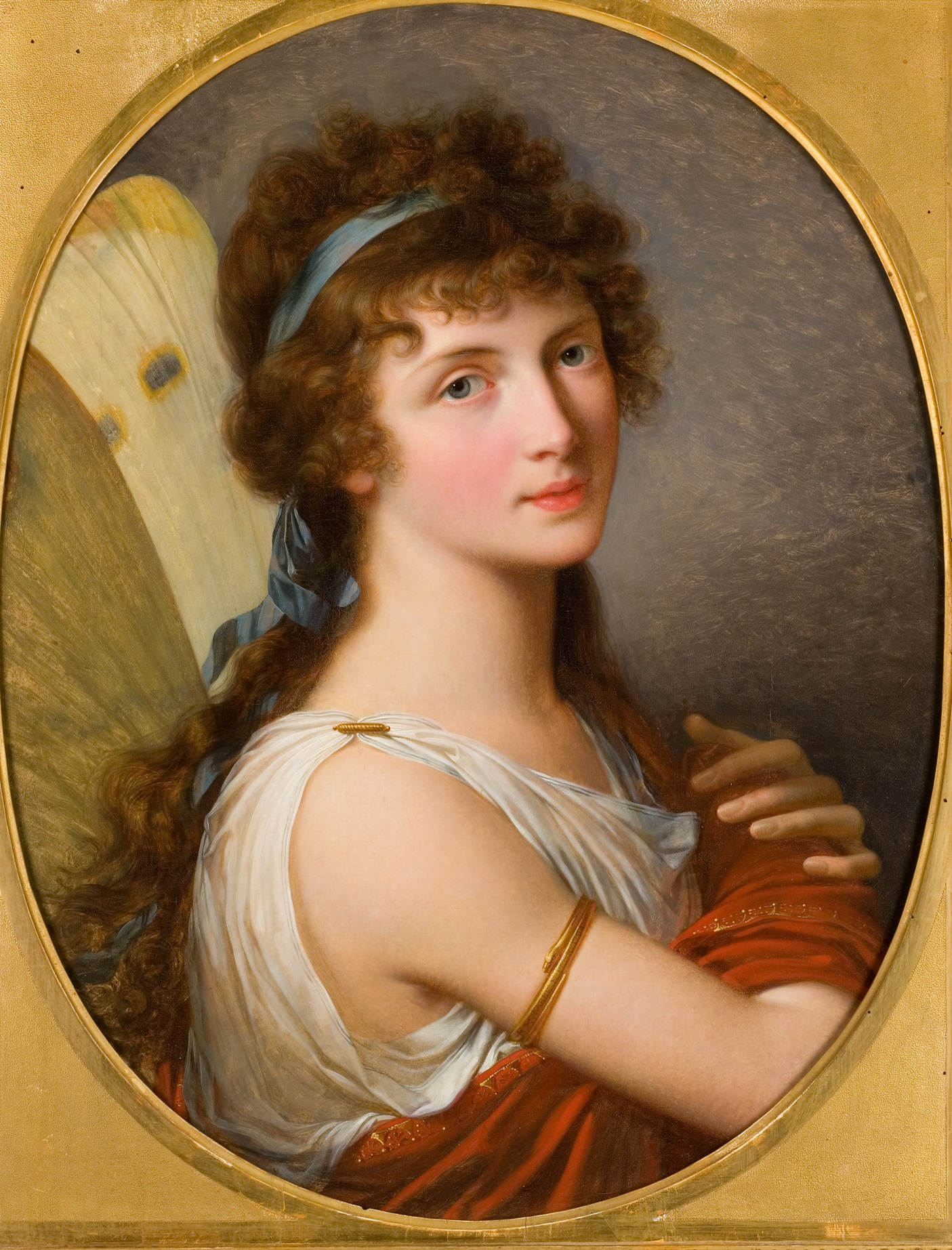
Portrait of Lady Charlemont as Psyche, by François-Xavier Fabre, 1796, Musée Fabre

A portrait of Anne as the Roman goddess Psyche, with butterfly wings and a blue silk ribbon in her hair, was painted by François-Xavier Fabre (1766–1837) in 1796, with a copy made by Louise, wife of Charles Edward Stuart. It formerly hung in the library of Palazzo Gianfigliazzi in Florence and is now in the Musée Fabre, Montpellier.

Her writings and drawings are preserved in the National Library of Ireland.
