= George Townshend, 1st Marquess Townshend =

British Army officer and politician (1724–1807)

Field Marshal The Most Honourable The Marquess Townshend PC
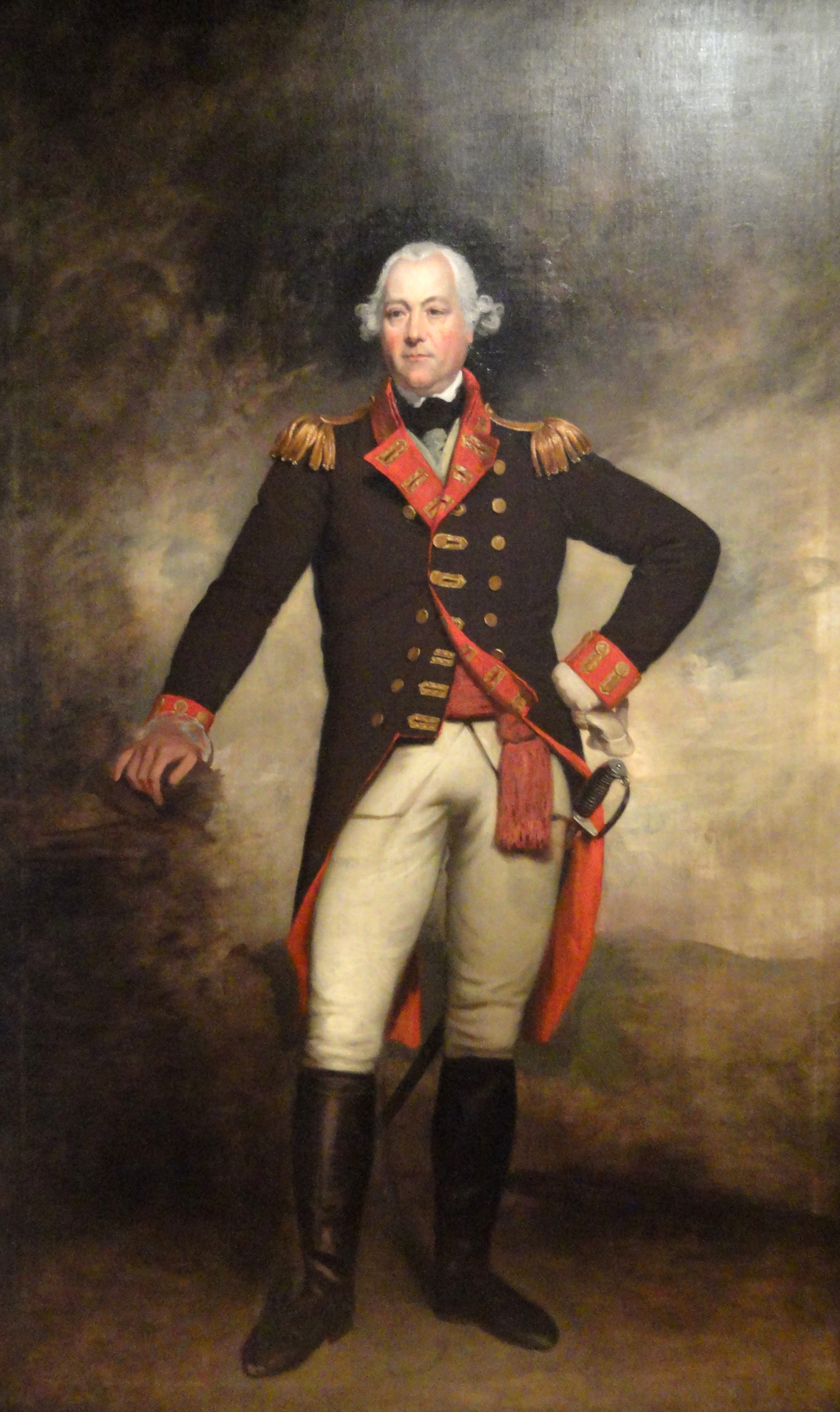
- Portrait attributed to Gilbert Stuart, c. 1786
- Born: 28 February 1724; London, England
- Died: 14 September 1807 (aged 83); Raynham Hall, Norfolk
- Children: 14, including George, John, Charles, Charlotte, and James
- Military career
- Allegiance: Great Britain
- Branch: British Army
- Service years: 1743–1796
- Rank: Field marshal
- Conflicts: War of the Austrian Succession; Battle of Dettingen; Battle of Lauffeld; Jacobite Rising; Battle of Culloden; Seven Years' War; Battle of the Plains of Abraham; Spanish invasion of Portugal

Field Marshal George Townshend, 1st Marquess Townshend, PC (28 February 1724 – 14 September 1807), styled as the Viscount Townshend from 1764 to 1787, was a British Army officer and politician. After serving at the Battle of Dettingen during the War of the Austrian Succession and the Battle of Culloden during the Jacobite Rising, Townshend took command of the British forces for the closing stages of the Battle of the Plains of Abraham during the Seven Years' War. He went on to be Lord Lieutenant of Ireland or Viceroy where he introduced measures aimed at increasing the size of Irish regiments, reducing corruption in Ireland and improving the Irish economy. In cooperation with Prime Minister North in London, he solidified governmental control over Ireland. He also served as Master-General of the Ordnance, first in the North Ministry and then in the Fox–North Coalition.

== Military career ==
=== Early years ===
Arms of Townshend: Azure, a chevron ermine between three escallops argent

Born the son of Charles Townshend, 3rd Viscount Townshend, and Audrey Etheldreda Townshend (born Harrison), Townshend was educated at Eton College and St John's College, Cambridge. He joined the army as a volunteer in Summer 1743 and first saw action at the Battle of Dettingen in June 1743 during the War of the Austrian Succession. He became a captain in the 7th Regiment of Dragoons in April 1745 and saw action in the Netherlands. He fought at the Battle of Culloden in April 1746 during the Jacobite Rising, and having been appointed an aide-de-Camp to the Duke of Cumberland and having transferred to the 20th Regiment of Foot in February 1747, he took part in the Battle of Lauffeld in July 1747 during the later stages of the War of the Austrian Succession.

While serving in Belgium, Townshend was elected Member of Parliament for Norfolk unopposed in 1747. He became a captain in the 1st Regiment of Foot Guards and lieutenant colonel in the Army on 25 February 1748. In 1751 he wrote a pamphlet which was deeply critical of Cumberland's military skills. Meanwhile, he argued in parliament that courts martial rather than commanding officers should be responsible for discipline in the Army, pressed for a larger militia and smaller standing army and was personally responsible for ensuring that the Militia Act 1757 reached the statute book. Once the legislation had passed, Townshend and his family assisted the Lord Lieutenant of Norfolk, George Walpole, 3rd Earl of Orford, in putting it into effect in the county. Orford nominated Townshend as Colonel of the West Norfolk Militia. Promoted to the rank of colonel in the army on 6 May 1758, he became colonel of the 64th Regiment of Foot in June 1759.

=== Seven Years' War ===
Townshend was given command of a brigade in Quebec under General James Wolfe; when the latter died on 13 September 1759, and his second-in-command (Robert Monckton) was wounded, Townshend took command of the British forces during Battle of the Plains of Abraham. He received Quebec City's surrender on 18 September 1759. However, he held General Wolfe in much contempt (drawing Wolfe in caricature he created Canada's first cartoon), and was harshly criticized upon his return to Great Britain for that reason (Wolfe was a popular hero throughout the country). Nevertheless, he became colonel of the 28th Regiment of Foot in October 1759, was promoted to major general on 6 March 1761 and fought at the Battle of Villinghausen in July 1761. In May 1762 he took command of a division of the Anglo-Portuguese army, with the local rank of lieutenant-general, to protect Portugal during the Spanish invasion of Portugal.

=== Post-war ===
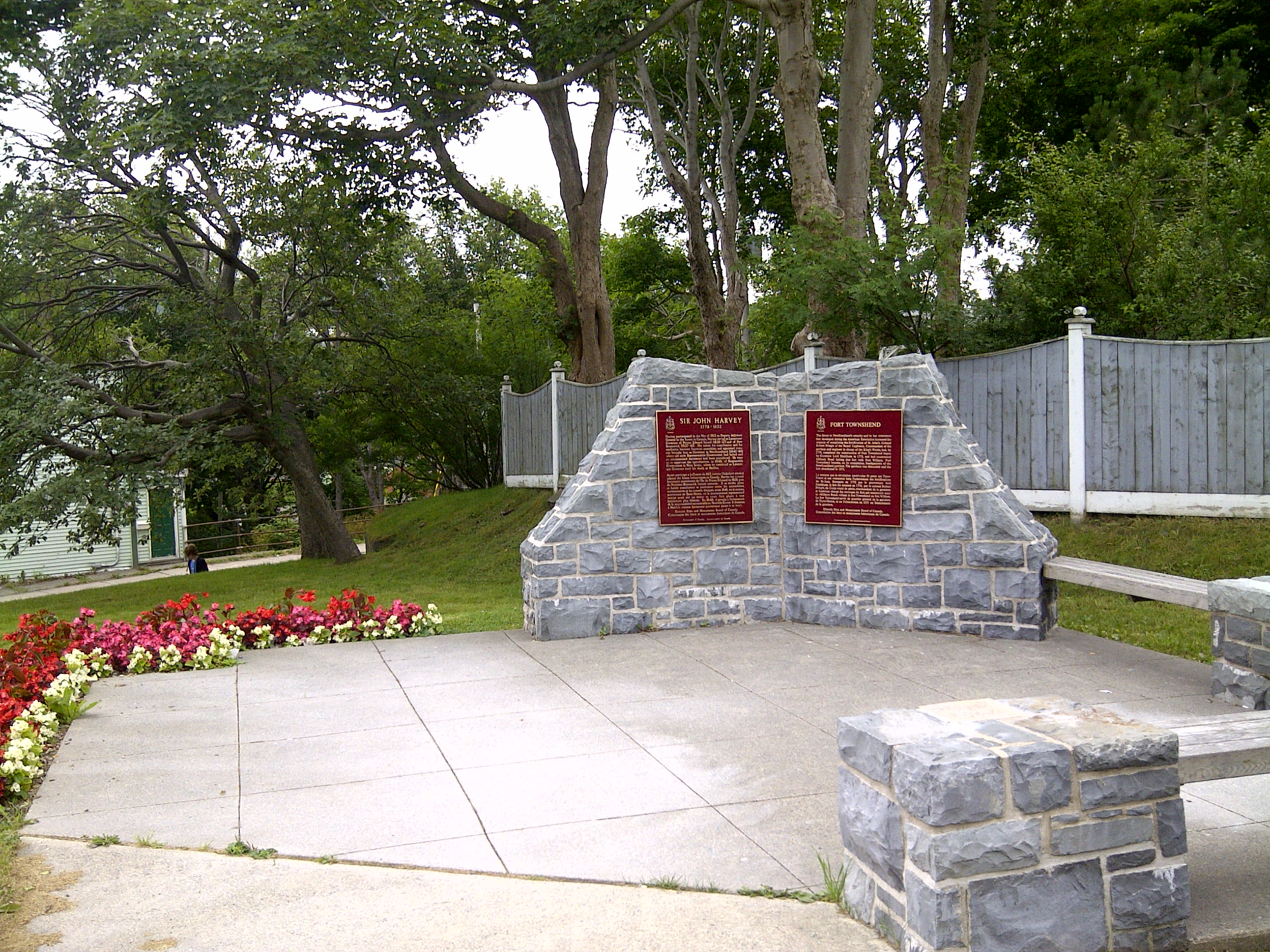
Site of Fort Townshend in Newfoundland and Labrador

Townshend became Lieutenant-General of the Ordnance in the Grenville Ministry in March 1763 and succeeded his father as Viscount Townshend in March 1764.

== Viceroy of Ireland ==
He went on to be Lord Lieutenant of Ireland in the Chatham Ministry in August 1767 and introduced measures aimed at increasing the size of Irish regiments, reducing corruption in Ireland and improving the Irish economy. After the Parliament of Ireland rejected his money bill, Townshend prorogued parliament in November 1767, making himself very unpopular in Dublin. Most important, he collaborated with Prime Minister Lord North in London in solidified governmental control over Ireland.

== Later life ==
Promoted to the substantive rank of lieutenant general on 30 April 1770, he was replaced as Lord Lieutenant of Ireland in September 1772.

Townshend returned to office as Master-General of the Ordnance in the North Ministry in October 1772. In the aftermath of his unpopular tour in Ireland, he found himself fighting a duel with Charles Coote, 1st Earl of Bellomont, an Irish Peer, on 2 February 1773, badly wounding the Earl with a bullet in the groin. Townshend became colonel of the 2nd Dragoon Guards in July 1773.

In 1779 Richard Edwards, Governor of Newfoundland and Labrador, began work on Fort Townshend, a fortification in Newfoundland and Labrador, naming it after Lord Townshend. Townshend stood down as Master-General of the Ordnance in March 1782 when the Marquess of Rockingham came to power but, having been promoted to full general on 26 November 1782, was restored to the post of Master-General of the Ordnance in the Fox–North Coalition in April 1783. He retired from that office when William Pitt the Younger came to power in January 1784.

Created Marquess Townshend on 27 October 1787, Townshend became Lord Lieutenant of Norfolk in February 1792. He also became Governor of Kingston-upon-Hull in 1794 and Governor of the Royal Hospital Chelsea in July 1795. A peculiar tragedy befell Townshend in May 1796: his son, Lord Charles, had just been elected MP for Great Yarmouth, and he took a carriage to London with his brother, the Rev. Lord Frederick, the Rector of Stiffkey. During the journey, Lord Frederick inexplicably killed his brother with a pistol shot to the head and was ultimately adjudged insane. Promoted to field marshal on 30 July 1796, Townshend died at his family home, Raynham Hall in Norfolk on 14 September 1807 and was buried in the family vault there.

== Family ==
On 19 December 1751, Townshend married Charlotte Compton, 16th Baroness Ferrers of Chartley (d. 1770), daughter of James Compton, 5th Earl of Northampton. They had eight children:

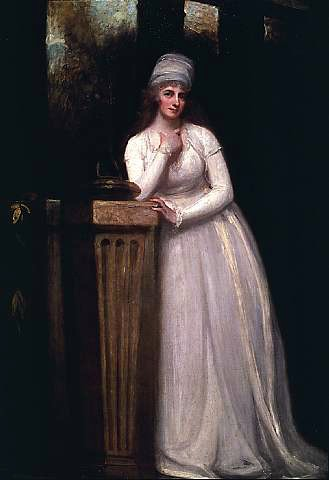
Townshend's second wife, Anne Montgomery, in 1802 by George Romney

- George Townshend, 2nd Marquess Townshend (18 April 1753 – 27 July 1811), known as The Lord Ferrers of Chartley from 1770 to 1784 and as Earl of Leicester from 1784 (created by George III)
- Lady Charlotte (15 October 1754 – 12 March 1760)
- Lady Caroline (26 November 1755 – 11 March 1760)
- Lord John Townshend (18 January 1757 – 25 February 1833)
- Lady Frances Townshend (28 March 1761 – 11 May 1761)
- Lady Elizabeth Townshend (20 August 1766–21 March 1811), married General William Loftus MP and had issue
- The Rev. Lord Frederick Patrick Townshend (30 December 1767 – 18 January 1836)
- Lord Charles Townshend (6 January 1769 – 27 May 1796)

He married Anne Montgomery, the daughter of Sir William Montgomery, 1st Baronet, on 19 May 1773. Anne was Mistress of the Robes to Caroline, Princess of Wales, from 1795 to 1820. They had six children:

- Lady Anne Townshend (1 February 1775 – 1826)
- Lady Charlotte Townshend (17 March 1776 – 30 July 1856), married the 6th Duke of Leeds.
- Lady Honoria Maria Townshend (6 July 1777 – 1826)
- Lord William Townshend (5 September 1778 – 1794)
- Captain Lord James Nugent Boyle Bernardo Townshend (11 September 1785 – 28 June 1842)
- Lady Henrietta Townshend (died 9 November 1848)

== Arms ==
Coat of arms of George Townshend, 1st Marquess Townshend
Crest A stag statant proper, attired and unguled or. Escutcheon Quarterly, 1st and 4th, Azure, a chevron ermine between three escallops argent (Townshend); 2nd and 3rd, quarterly gules and or, in the first quarter a mullet argent, in the centre a crescent sable (Vere). Supporters Dexter, A stag sable, attired and unguled or; Sinister, A greyhound argent. Motto Hæc generi incrementa fides (Faith obtained these honours for our race’). Other versions The arms are also shown without the Vere quarters.

== Sources ==
- Heathcote, Tony (1999). The British Field Marshals, 1736–1997: A Biographical Dictionary. Barnsley: Leo Cooper. ISBN 0-85052-696-5.

Parliament of Great Britain
Preceded by Armine Wodehouse; Viscount Coke	Member of Parliament for Norfolk; 1747–1764; With: Armine Wodehouse	Succeeded by Armine Wodehouse; Thomas de Grey
Political offices
Preceded by The Earl of Bristol	Lord Lieutenant of Ireland; 1767–1772	Succeeded by The Earl Harcourt
Military offices
Preceded by Marquess of Granby	Lieutenant-General of the Ordnance; 1763–1767	Succeeded by Hon. Henry Seymour Conway
Vacant Title last held by Marquess of Granby	Master-General of the Ordnance; 1772–1782	Succeeded by The 3rd Duke of Richmond
Preceded by The Earl Waldegrave	Colonel of the 2nd Dragoon Guards (Queen's Bays); 1773–1807	Succeeded by Charles Craufurd
Preceded by The 3rd Duke of Richmond	Master-General of the Ordnance; 1783–1784	Succeeded by The 3rd Duke of Richmond
Preceded by James Murray	Governor of Kingston-upon-Hull; 1794–1795	Succeeded by Hon. William Harcourt
Preceded by Sir George Howard	Governor, Royal Hospital Chelsea; 1795–1796	Succeeded by Sir William Fawcett
Honorary titles
Preceded by The Earl of Orford	Lord Lieutenant of Norfolk; 1792–1807	Succeeded by The Lord Suffield
Preceded by The Earl of Orford	Vice-Admiral of Norfolk; 1792–1807	Vacant Title next held by The Lord Suffield
Preceded by The Marquess of Stafford	Senior Privy Counsellor; 1803–1807	Succeeded by The Duke of Marlborough
Peerage of Great Britain
New creation	Marquess Townshend; 1787–1807	Succeeded by George Townshend
Peerage of England
Preceded by Charles Townshend	Viscount Townshend; 1764–1807	Succeeded by George Townshend
