= John Cochran (artist) =

Scottish engraver and portrait miniaturist

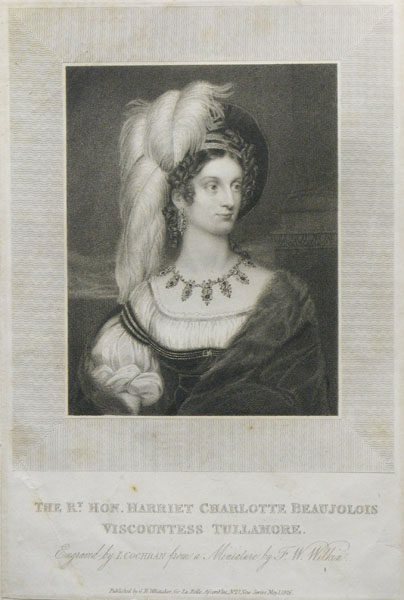
Portrait of Harriet Charlotte Beaujolois, Viscountess Tullamore. Copper engraving by John Cochran after F. W. Wilkin. La Belle Assemblee No. 11 New Series 1 May 1826

John Cochran or Cochrane (active 1821–1865) was a Scottish portrait miniaturist, a stipple and line engraver and a painter of watercolours. Cochran exhibited his portraits at the Royal Academy between 1821 and 1823, and at the Suffolk Street Gallery from 1821 to 1827.

Cochran contributed steelplate engravings to The National Portrait Gallery (four volumes, 1820), Wilson and Chambers's Land of Burns (1840) and Wright's Gallery of Engravings (1844–1846).

Cochrane painted portraits of many famous people such as Queen Victoria at the age of 18, King William IV, the Duke of Gloucester and Edinburgh, the Duke of York and Albany, Viscountess Beresford, the Viscount Nelson and the Earl of St Vincent. At the National Portrait Gallery they list 61 portraits by Cochran.

Cochran also painted watercolours of Scottish landscapes and coastal scenes. It is unknown yet if he was related to the Scottish painter William Cochran (artist) (1738–1785).
