= George Osborne, 6th Duke of Leeds =

British noble (1775–1838)

His Grace The Duke of Leeds KG PC
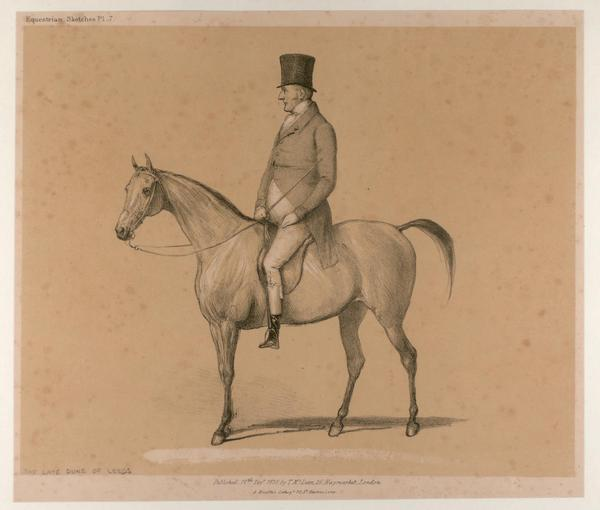

Master of the Horse
- In office 1827–1830
- Monarchs: George IV; William IV
- Prime Minister: George Canning; The Viscount Goderich; The Duke of Wellington
- Preceded by: The Duke of Dorset
- Succeeded by: The Earl of Albemarle

Personal details
- Born: 21 July 1775 London, England
- Died: 10 July 1838 (aged 62) London, England
- Spouse: Lady Charlotte Townshend (m. 1797)
- Children: 3, including Francis

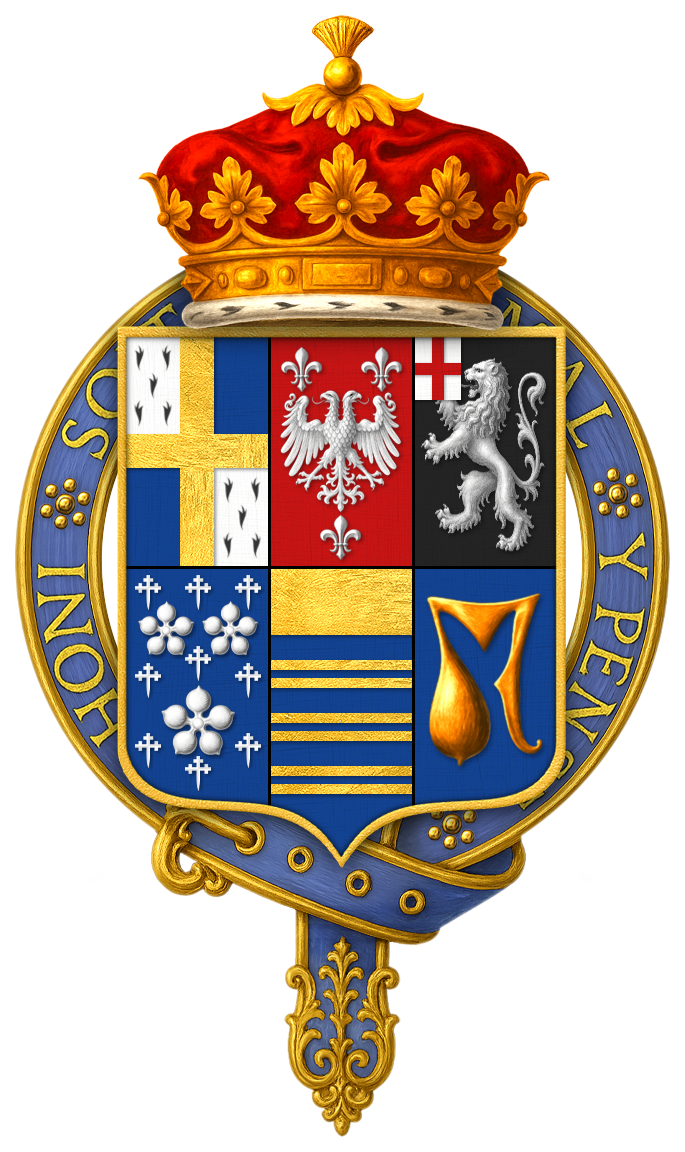
Quartered arms of George Osborne, 6th Duke of Leeds, KG, PC

George William Frederick Osborne, 6th Duke of Leeds, KG, PC (21 July 1775 – 10 July 1838), styled Earl of Danby until 1789 and Marquess of Carmarthen from 1789 to 1799, was a British peer and politician. He served as Master of the Horse between 1827 and 1830. He also was Governor of Scilly.

== Background ==
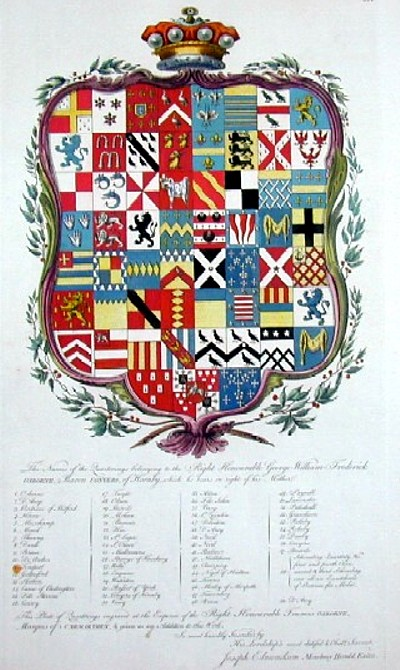
Coat of Arms of The 6th Duke of Leeds with 59 heraldic quarterings

Leeds was born in London, the eldest son of Francis Osborne, 5th Duke of Leeds, and his first wife, Amelia, Baroness Darcy de Knayth, daughter of Robert Darcy, 4th Earl of Holderness. Francis Osborne, 1st Baron Godolphin, was his younger brother. His parents divorced in 1779. In January 1784, aged eight, he succeeded as 13th Baron Darcy de Knayth and 10th Baron Conyers on the early death of his mother. In 1799 he also succeeded his father in the dukedom of Leeds.

== Political career ==
Leeds was appointed Lord Lieutenant of the North Riding of Yorkshire in 1802, a post he held until his death. In May 1827 he entered George Canning's government as Master of the Horse. He continued in this office under Lord Goderich between August 1827 and January 1828 and under the Duke of Wellington between January 1828 and November 1830. He was sworn of the Privy Council in 1827 and made a Knight of the Garter the same month.

== Family ==
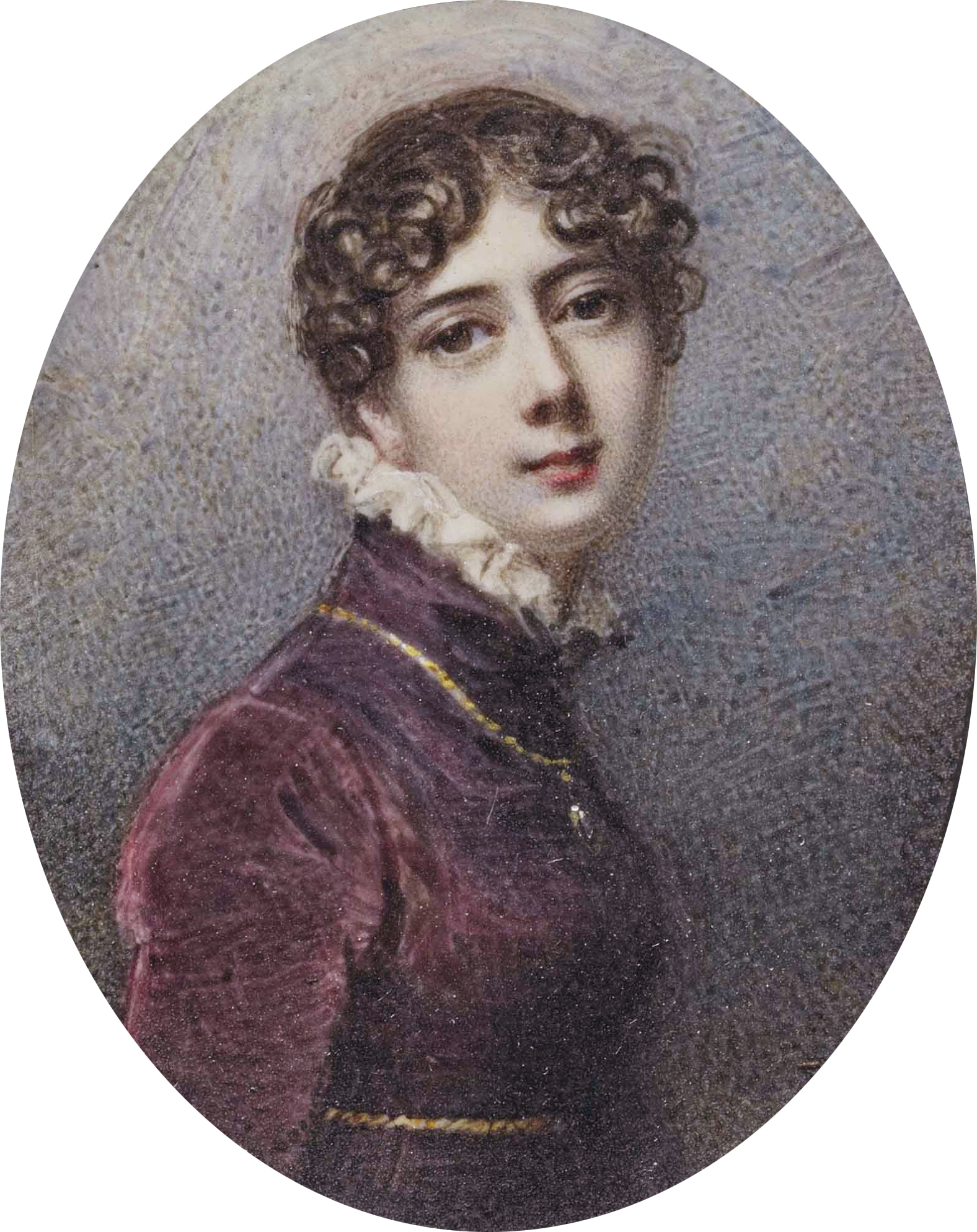
Charlotte Townshend (Anne Mee nee Foldsone)

Leeds married Lady Charlotte Townshend, daughter of George Townshend, 1st Marquess Townshend, on 17 August 1797. They had three children:

- Francis Godolphin Osborne, 7th Duke of Leeds (1798–1859)
- Lady Charlotte Mary Anne Georgiana Osborne (c. 1806–1836), married Sackville Lane-Fox and had issue.
- Lord Conyers George Thomas William Osborne (1812–1831), died young.

The Duke of Leeds died in London in July 1838, aged 62, and was buried in the Osborne family chapel at All Hallows Church, Harthill, South Yorkshire. He was succeeded in the dukedom by his eldest and only surviving son, Francis. The Duchess of Leeds died in July 1856, aged 80.

Political offices
Preceded by The Duke of Dorset	Master of the Horse; 1827–1830	Succeeded by The Earl of Albemarle
Honorary titles
Preceded by The Earl Fauconberg	Lord Lieutenant of the North Riding of Yorkshire; 1802–1838	Succeeded by Lord Dundas
Preceded by The 5th Duke of Leeds	Governor of the Isles of Scilly; 1799−1834	Succeeded by Augustus Smith
Peerage of England
Preceded by Francis Osborne	Duke of Leeds; 1799–1838	Succeeded by Francis D'Arcy-Osborne
Preceded by Francis Osborne	Baron Osborne; 1799–1838	Succeeded by Francis D'Arcy-Osborne
Preceded by Amelia Osborne	Baron Darcy de Knayth and Conyers; 1784–1838	Succeeded by Francis D'Arcy-Osborne
Portuguese nobility
Preceded by Amelia Osborne	Count of Mértola; 1784–1838	Succeeded by Francis D'Arcy-Osborne
