= Anthony Cardon =

Flemish engraver in England (1772–1813)

- Born: 1772; Brussels
- Died: 17 February 1813 (aged 40–41); London Street, Fitzroy Square
- Known for: Engraving, illustration
- Movement: Genre scenes of street life

Anthony Cardon (1772–1813) was a Flemish engraver in chalk or stipple, who made his career in England and became noted for his engravings and book illustrations.

== Life ==
Anthony Cardon was born in Brussels in around 1772. He was the son and pupil of a Flemish painter, Antoine Alexandre Joseph Cardon (1765- 1822) and took prizes at the Academy in Brussels. During the troubles in the Low Countries preceding the Flanders Campaign of 1793, Cardon, aged 17 years, went to England, with a letter of introduction to Paul Colnaghi, who gave him employment. He received his early art education at the Royal Academy Schools and studied three years under his friend Luigi Schiavonetti.

His primary medium was stipple engraving and he became a leading exponent of the method during his lifetime. He is best remembered for the engravings used in book illustrations. Some of the titles for which Cardon was the engraver include: Essays After Cartoons Raphael Windsor by Nicholas Joseph Ruyssen and Anthony Cardon, published in 1798 and an 1811 edition of the Book of Common Prayer, published by F. & C. Rivington of London. Cardon also engraved portraits of George III and prominent contemporaries.

He was an early member of the Chalcographic Society and a member of the Society of the Encouragement of the Arts and received their gold medal for his Battle of Alexandria in 1807.

Cardon died on 17 February 1813, in London Street, Fitzroy Square. His son, Philip Cardon, was trained as an engraver, drew in Indian work, and died about 1817. Examples of Cardon's work can be found in the National Portrait Gallery, London, The British Museum, The Victoria and Albert Museum, The Morgan Library and Museum and in the books he illustrated, many of which are in museum and library collections.

== Gallery ==
Plates from the Cries of London series

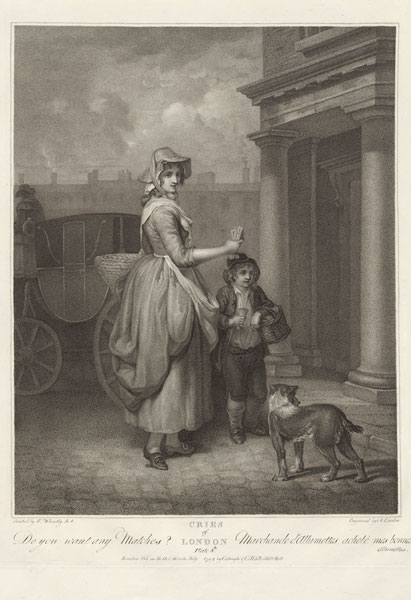
"Do you want any Matches?" from Cries of London by Anthony Cardon, 1794

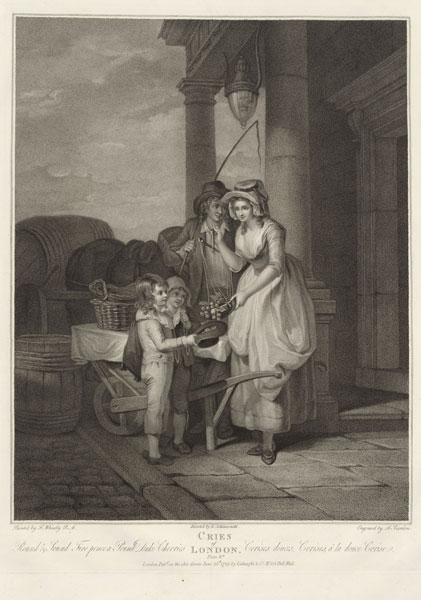
"Round & Sound Five Pence Pound Duke Cherries," from Cries of London by Anthony Cardon, 1794

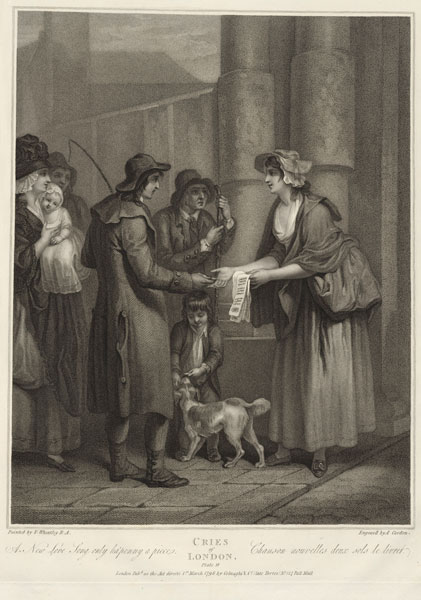
"A New Love Song only ha'penny a piece," from Cries of London by Anthony Cardon, 1796

== Works ==
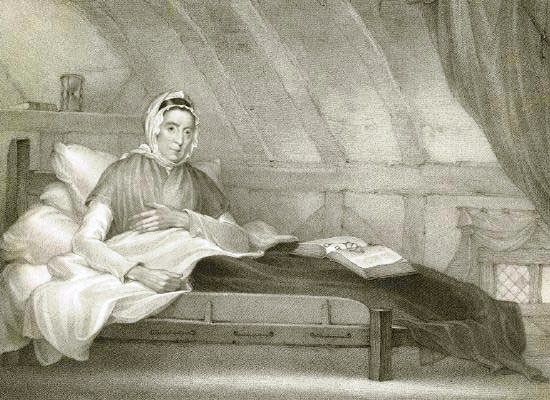
Ann Moore of Tutbury, 1812 engraving by Anthony Cardon

In 1807 Cardon received the gold medal of the Society of Arts for his engraving of the Battle of Alexandria, after Philippe Jacques de Loutherbourg. He also engraved:

- The Battle of Maida, after De Loutherbourg;
- Plates of the Campaign against Tippoo Sahib;
- The Presentation of Catharine of France to Henry V of England, after Thomas Stothard;
- Salvator Mundi, after Carlo Dolci;
- The Woman taken in Adultery, after Rubens;
- The Rustic Minstrel, Innocent Captivation, and The Storming of Seringapatam, after Henry Singleton, c. 1780.
- l'Enfant Prodigue Recoit sa Legitime (The Prodigal Son Receives his Legitimate Share), 1780
- Cries of London - a series of engravings of street life and street vendors

== Notes ==
Attribution

This article incorporates text from a publication now in the public domain: Stephen, Leslie, ed. (1887). "Cardon, Anthony". Dictionary of National Biography. Vol. 9. London: Smith, Elder & Co.
