= Henry Hoppner Meyer =

English portrait painter and engraver

- Born: John Meyer; 12 June 1780; London, England
- Died: 28 May 1847 (aged 66); London, England
- Education: Christ’s Hospital; Royal Academy Schools
- Occupations: Portrait painter; stipple & mezzotint engraver; art teacher
- Known for: Mezzotint and stipple engraving; portraiture
- Movement: Romantic
- Patrons: Various private collectors

Henry Hoppner Meyer RBA (12 June 1780 – 28 May 1847) was a British portrait painter and stipple and mezzotint engraver. He trained at Christ’s Hospital under Benjamin Green, was apprenticed to Benjamin Smith for seven years, and studied engraving under Francesco Bartolozzi at the Royal Academy Schools.

== Biography ==
John Meyer was born on 12 June 1780 in London, the son of hairdresser John Meyer and Anna Torade Hoppner. In 1791 he enrolled at Christ’s Hospital where he studied drawing under Benjamin Green. On 25 August 1794 he was apprenticed to engraver Benjamin Smith, completing his apprenticeship in 1801.

From 1802 Meyer began exhibiting small portrait-paintings at the Royal Academy, while simultaneously producing mezzotint and stipple engravings of prominent figures. His engraved portraits included Lady Hamilton, Admiral Nelson, Sir John Nicholl, Lord Byron and Giuseppe Ambrogetti; notably, his stipple of Charles Lamb was displayed at the India Office between 1820 and 1850.

Between 1824 and 1830 Meyer was a founding member of the Society of British Artists, exhibiting over fifty works of portraiture and genre scenes, and serving as its President in 1828–1829.

In the 1830s–1840s he took on private pupils in stipple engraving and portraiture, teaching at his studio in Fitzrovia, London. Among his students were Jane Waterhouse and Thomas Fairchild, who both went on to exhibit at the Royal Academy. By this time, he had incidentally made a lasting impact on Portugal and Brazil, being the engraver of a rare and remarkably detailed portrait of D. Pedro as Regent of Portugal — the future Pedro IV, King of Portugal, and I Emperor of Brazil. The portrait was printed for an exquisite edition of Portugal's second Constitution of 1826, printed in London in 1832 by L. Thompson. This indirect connection to the exiled Portuguese community in London must have been made through Bartolozzi.

== Works ==
- Charles Lamb (stipple engraving, 1815) – India Office, London
- Portrait of Lady Hamilton (mezzotint, 1808) – National Portrait Gallery, London
- Sir John Nicholl (stippling, 1812) – Welsh National Museum, Cardiff
- Self‑portrait (oil on canvas, 1822) – private collection
- Portrait of D. Pedro as Regent of Portugal (stippling, c. 1832)

== Exhibitions ==
- Royal Academy: 1802, 1808, 1815, 1822
- Society of British Artists: 1824–1830 (President 1828–1829)
- British Institution: 1835 (solo show of engravings)

== Collections ==
Meyer’s works are held in:

- National Portrait Gallery, London
- British Museum, London
- National Maritime Museum, Greenwich
- Victoria and Albert Museum, London

== Family and namesakes ==
His son, Bernard Francis Hoppner Meyer (20 April 1811 – 3 June 1888), was also an engraver who signed “Hoppner Meyer” and emigrated to America in 1830. A second son, Henry Meyer (b. 1817), later adopted “Henry Hoppner Meyer,” causing historical confusion; however, the elder Meyer never used “Hoppner” during his lifetime.
