= Armytage baronets of Kirklees (2nd creation, 1738) =

Armytage baronets
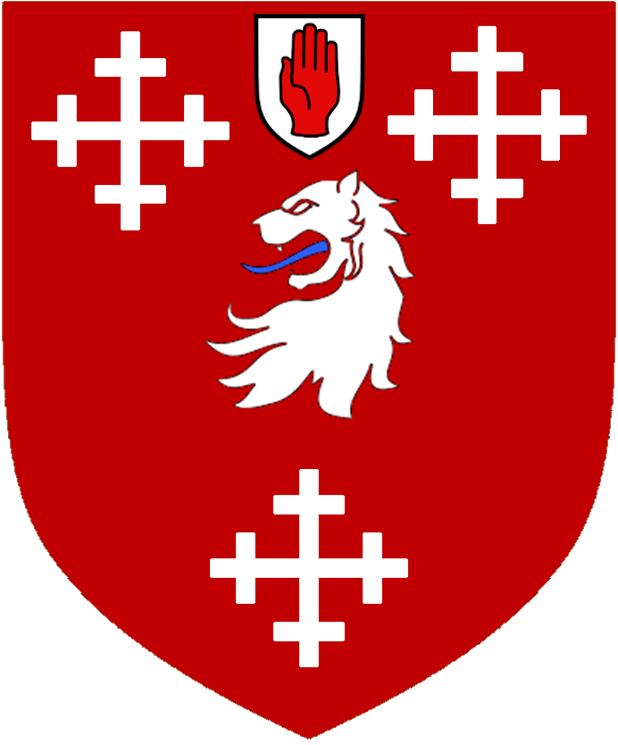
- Escutcheon of the Armytage baronets of Kirklees
- Creation: 1738
- Status: extant
- Motto: Semper paratus (Always ready)
- Arms: Gules a Lion's Head erased between three Cross Crosslets Argent
- Crest: A Dexter Arm embowed couped at the shoulder habited Or cuffed Argent holding in the Hand proper a Staff Gules headed and pointed Or

The Armytage baronetcy, of Kirklees in the County of York, was created in the Baronetage of Great Britain on 4 July 1738 for Samuel Armytage, High Sheriff of Yorkshire in 1739. He was the great-grandson of Edward Armytage, younger brother of John Armytage, father of the 1st Baronet of the first creation, extinct the previous year. The 6th Baronet of the first creation had left his estates to him.

The 1st Baronet was succeeded by his eldest son, the 2nd Baronet, who sat as Member of Parliament for York. He died unmarried and was succeeded by his younger brother, George the 3rd Baronet, also Member of Parliament for York. His son the 4th Baronet served as High Sheriff of Yorkshire from 1791 to 1792, succeeded by his grandson, the 5th Baronet, a deputy lieutenant of Yorkshire.

In 1899 the title passed to the 6th Baronet, Chairman of the Lancashire and Yorkshire Railway Company, a deputy lieutenant of Yorkshire and high sheriff of Yorkshire in 1907. The 7th Baronet was a brigadier-general in the British Army and fought in the First World War. At the end of the Second War he was Military Governor of Hamburg in occupied Germany.

The family seat is Kirklees Park, Brighouse, Yorkshire.

== Armytage baronets, of Kirklees (1738) ==
- Sir Samuel Armytage, 1st Baronet (1695–1747)
- Sir John Armytage, 2nd Baronet (1732–1758)
- Sir George Armytage, 3rd Baronet (1734–1783)
- Sir George Armytage, 4th Baronet (1761–1836)
- Sir George Armytage, 5th Baronet (1819–1899)
- Sir George John Armytage, 6th Baronet (1842–1918)
- Sir George Ayscough Armytage, 7th Baronet (1872–1953)
- Sir John Lionel Armytage, 8th Baronet (1901–1983)
- Sir (John) Martin Armytage, 9th Baronet (1933–2025)
- Sir Hugh Anthony Armytage, 10th Baronet (born 1955)

The heir apparent is George Alexander Armytage (born 2001), the son of the present holder.

== Extended family ==
Reginald William Armytage (1903–1984), younger son of the 7th Baronet, was a rear-admiral in the Royal Navy. His eldest son David George Armytage (born 1929) is a captain in the Royal Navy.

== Notes ==
Baronetage of Great Britain
| Preceded by Payne baronets | Armytage baronets of Kirklees; 4 July 1738 | Succeeded by Hulse baronets |
