= Thornville =

Thornville may refer to:

- Thornville, KwaZulu-Natal, a town in South Africa
- Thornville, Michigan, an unincorporated community in the United States
- Thornville, North Yorkshire, a civil parish in England
- Thornville, Ohio, a village in the United States
- Thornville, Queensland, a locality in the Toowoomba Region, Australia

== See also ==
- Old Thornville, historic building in England
