= Sir John Lister Kaye, 4th Baronet =

British landowner and Tory politician

Sir John Lyster Kaye, 4th Baronet (1697–1752) of Denby Grange, Kirkheaton, Yorkshire, was a British landowner and Tory politician who sat in the House of Commons from 1734 to 1741.

Kaye was baptised at Almondbury, on 4 September 1697, the eldest son of George Kaye of Denby Grange, Kirkheaton, Yorkshire, and his wife Dorothy Savile, daughter of Robert Savile of Bryan Royd, near Elland, Yorkshire. He matriculated at Christ Church, Oxford on 24 May 1715, aged 18. He married Ellen Wilkinson, daughter of John Wilkinson of Greenhead, near Huddersfield. He succeeded his uncle Sir Arthur Kaye, Bt to the baronetcy on 10 July 1726. His wife Ellen died on 29 January 1729. He married Dorothy Richardson, daughter of Richard Richardson, MD of North Bierley, Yorkshire as his second wife on 29 July 1730.

Kaye stood for Yorkshire as a Tory at a by-election on 1 February caused by the death of his uncle, Sir Arthur Kaye, but was unsuccessful. He was invited by the local Tories to stand for York at the 1734 British general election, and was returned as Member of Parliament without a contest. He voted against the Government. In 1735, he became an Alderman of York and in 1737 became Lord Mayor of York. He was defeated at the 1741 British general election. In 1742, he was invited to stand again for York at a by-election, but decided not to because of his health. He recommended instead George Fox, who was elected.

Kaye succeeded to estates of his uncle Thomas Lister (formerly Kaye) of Thornton-in-Craven, Yorkshire in 1745, taking in addition the name of Lister before Kaye. He died on 5 April 1752 and was buried at Flockton.

He had one son John by his first wife Ellen, who succeeded to the baronetcy, and four sons by his second wife Dorothy.

Parliament of Great Britain
Preceded by Sir William Milner, 1st Baronet; Edward Thompson	Member of Parliament for York; 1734–1741; With: Edward Thompson	Succeeded by Godfrey Wentworth; Edward Thompson
Baronetage of England
Preceded by Arthur Kaye	Baronet (of Woodesham); 1626-1752	Succeeded by John Lister Kaye
