= Old Thornville =

Building in Thornville, North Yorkshire, England

Coordinates: 53°59′11″N 1°18′20″W

Old Thornville is a historic building in Thornville, North Yorkshire, a hamlet in England.

A settlement named "Catala" was recorded in the Domesday Book. This is listed as a deserted medieval village, but the old manor house survived. The current house was probably constructed in the 1660s, and was extended in the 18th century. It is a prominent example of building in rusticated brick with Dutch gables. It was the home of politician William Thornton, and his son Thomas Thornton. The house was grade II* listed in 1966.

The country house is built of red brick with a hipped stone slate roof. It has a square plan around a courtyard, with a south front of two and three storeys and six bays. The front has a floor band, an eaves band, and a parapet with coping and eleven ball finials. The doorway has Tuscan columns with a hood, and a fanlight, and the windows are sashes with gauged brick arches. Inside, there is an early-18th century staircase, while the drawing room has panelling from the middle of the century with high-quality carving.

== See also ==
- Grade II* listed buildings in North Yorkshire (district)
- Listed buildings in Thornville, North Yorkshire
