= Francis Armitage =

Francis Armitage or Armytage may refer to:

- Francis Armitage, character in Class (2016 TV series)
- Sir Francis Armytage, 1st Baronet (c. 1600–1644) of the Armytage baronets
