= Godfrey Wentworth =

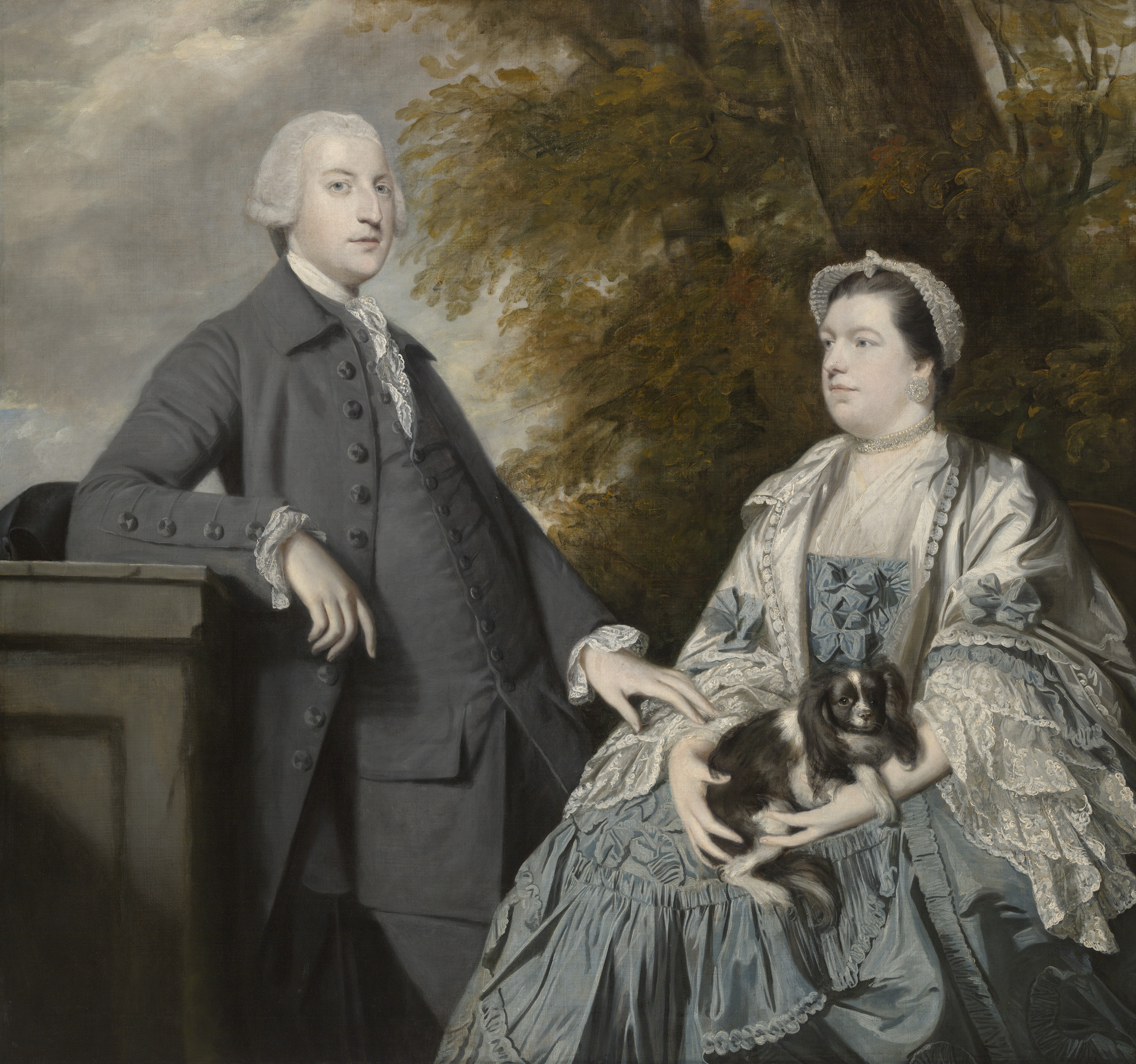
- portrait by Joshua Reynolds

Member of the Great Britain Parliament for York
- In office 1741–1742
- Preceded by: Sir John Lister Kaye; Edward Thompson
- Succeeded by: George Fox
- In office 1742–1747
- Preceded by: George Fox
- Succeeded by: George Fox; Sir William Thornton

Personal details
- Born: 17 October 1704
- Died: 18 January 1789 (aged 84) Hickleton Hall
- Spouse: Dorothy Pilkington
- Children: Anna Maria (1736–1788)
- Parent(s): Godfrey Wentworth; Anne Clark
- Education: St John's College, Cambridge

Godfrey Wentworth was one of two Members of the Parliament of Great Britain for the constituency of York from 1741–1742 and again from 1742–1747.

== Life and politics ==
Wentworth belonged to a branch of the Wentworth Woodhouse family. He was educated at Wakefield School before graduating from St John's College, Cambridge in 1722. He married his first cousin, Dorothy Pilkington in 1728. The marriage was dissolved in 1758. Dorothy was the daughter of Sir Lyon Pilkington, 4th Baronet of Stanley. They had a daughter, Anna Maria, who eventually married Sir George Armytage, 3rd Baronet.

Wentworth had been a long serving Alderman in the city of York before becoming an MP for the city. He was also Lord mayor of York in 1759. Being a long term officer of the city corporation, his election in 1741 was designed to bring back some Tory balance to the seat and Parliament. He was noted for supporting moves to prevent electoral corruption.

He died on 18 January 1789.

Political offices
Preceded by Sir John Lister Kaye; Edward Thompson	Member of Parliament; 1741–1742	Next: George Fox; Godfrey Wentworth
Preceded by George Fox	Member of Parliament; 1742–1747	Next: George Fox; Sir William Thornton
