= Charles Payne =

Charles Payne may refer to:

- Charles Payne (clergyman) (1830–1899), Methodist clergyman and president of Ohio Wesleyan University
- Charles Payne (television personality) (born 1962), American Fox Business Network contributor and co-host of Varney & Co.
- Charles Payne (cricketer, born 1827) (1827–1859), English clergyman and cricketer
- Charles Payne (cricketer, born 1832) (1832–1909), English cricketer
- Charles Payne (Australian cricketer) (1876–1938), Australian cricketer
- Charles M. Payne (born 1948), American academic
- Charles T. Payne (1925–2014), great uncle of US President Barack Obama
- Charles Payne (rugby union)
- C. M. Payne (1873–1964), American cartoonist
- Sir Charles Payne, 1st Baronet (died 1738), of the Payne baronets
- Sir Charles Gillies Payne, 4th Baronet (1793–1870), of the Payne baronets
- Sir Charles Robert Salusbury Payne, 6th Baronet (1859–1942), of the Payne baronets
- Charlie Payne (born 1944), former Australian rules footballer

== See also ==
- Charles Paine (disambiguation)
