= John Armytage =

British Army officer and politician (1732–1758)

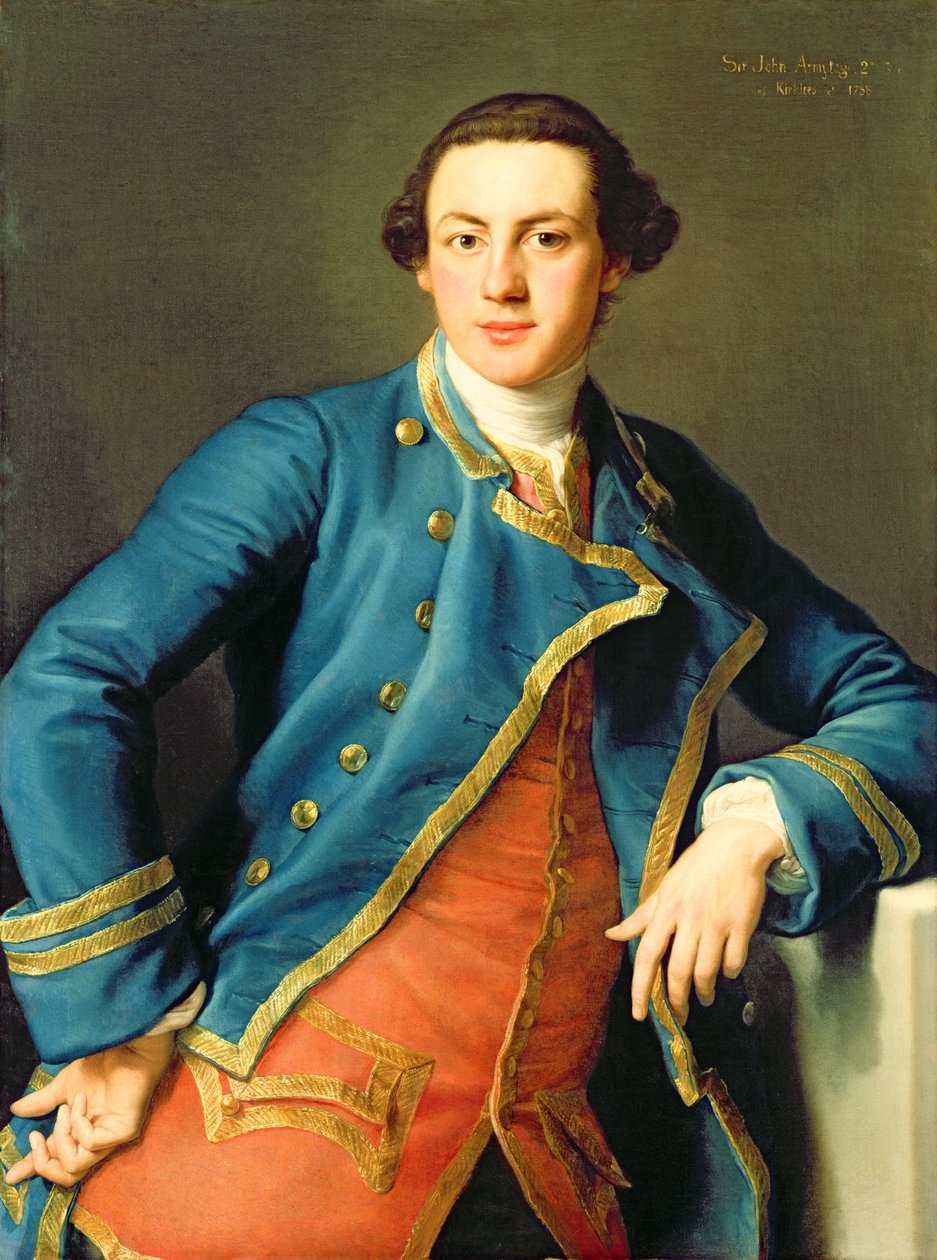
c. 1758 portrait of Armytage by Pompeo Batoni

Sir John Armytage, 2nd Baronet (13 July 1732 – 10 September 1758) was a British Army officer and politician who represented York in the House of Commons of Great Britain from 1754 to 1758. He was the oldest son of Sir Samuel Armytage, 1st Baronet and his wife Anne Griffith, daughter of Thomas Griffith, and was educated at Eton. In 1747, he succeeded his father as baronet. He was admitted to Trinity College, Cambridge in 1751, receiving his MA in 1753. Armytage was a Member of Parliament (MP) for York between 1754 and 1758. He died in the Battle of Saint Cast in France having been a volunteer in the Seven Years' War, unmarried and aged only 27, and was succeeded in the baronetcy by his younger brother George.

Parliament of Great Britain
Preceded by William Thornton; George Fox	Member of Parliament for York; 1754 – 1758; With: George Fox	Succeeded by William Thornton; George Fox
Baronetage of Great Britain
Preceded by Samuel Armytage	Baronet (of Kirklees); 1747 – 1758	Succeeded by George Armytage
