= George Armytage (politician) =

British politician

Sir George Armytage, 3rd Baronet (25 December 1734 – 21 January 1783) was a British politician.

In 1758, he succeeded his older brother John as baronet. Armytage was a member of parliament (MP) for York from 1761 to 1768.

== Family ==
On 10 April 1760, Armytage married Anna Maria Wentworth, eldest daughter of Godfrey Wentworth at St Marylebone Church in London. They had three daughters and three sons, of whose George, the oldest succeeded to the baronetcy.

- Godfrey Wentworth Wentworth (1773–1834), MP, third son of Sir George Armytage, 3rd Baronet, married in 1794 Amelia, daughter of Walter Ramsden Beaumont Fawkes and sister of Walter Fawkes.

Parliament of Great Britain
Preceded by William Thornton; George Fox	Member of Parliament for York; 1761 – 1768; With: Robert Fox-Lane	Succeeded by Charles Turner; Lord John Cavendish
Baronetage of Great Britain
Preceded by John Armytage	Baronet (of Kirklees); 1758–1783	Succeeded by George Armytage
