= Kaye baronets =

Set index for Shelley baronets

There have been three baronetcies created for persons with the surname Kaye, one in the Baronetage of England and two in the Baronetage of the United Kingdom.

- Kaye baronets of Woodesham (1642)
- Kaye baronets of Grange (1812), later Lister-Kaye baronets
- Kaye baronets of Huddersfield (1923)

== See also ==
- Kay baronets
