= Scurvy: How a Surgeon, a Mariner, and a Gentleman Solved the Greatest Medical Mystery of the Age of Sail =

2004 nonfiction book by Stephen R. Bown

- Author: Stephen R. Bown
- Language: English
- Subject: History of medicine
- Genre: Non-fiction
- Publisher: St. Martin's Press
- Publication date: 17 March 2004
- Publication place: United States
- Pages: 272
- ISBN: 9780312313920

Scurvy: How a Surgeon, a Mariner, and a Gentleman Solved the Greatest Medical Mystery of the Age of Sail is a 2004 nonfiction book by Stephen R. Bown. Bown explores the way in which scurvy killed numerous sailors during the Age of Sail. He hypothesizes that scurvy contributed to the defeat of Britain during the American Revolutionary War, and that its cure assisted with a British victory at the Battle of Trafalgar mere decades later.

== Summary ==
The book reviews the history of scurvy and the long scientific journey towards discovering a cure. Bown also discusses the life of sailors during the Age of Sail, including the typical diet of an average sailor, which consisted mostly of biscuits and salted meat. Living conditions were unsanitary, and food was often contaminated by mold, insect larvae, and rodents.

In 1535, the crew of Jacques Cartier was stranded on the Saint Lawrence River. The crew began suffering from scurvy. Cartier learned from the Iroquois that the bark of a local tree, likely white cedar, would cure the disease. This knowledge allowed the surviving men to recover.

In 1601, privateer James Lancaster successfully prevented scurvy through the use of lemon juice. Throughout the following decades, the use of lemon juice gradually fell out of favor. Medical theorists of the time generally believed that diseases were caused by an imbalance of the four humours.

In 1740, George Anson left England in an attempt to circumnavigate the world. By the time of his return in 1744, about 10% of his men had survived. More men died from scurvy than from shipwrecks, battle, and other diseases combined. Anson’s voyage sparked new interest in scurvy research.

In 1747, Scottish physician James Lind designed and conducted a rudimentary clinical trial. When sailors began suffering from scurvy, he assigned them different diets to assess the efficacy of purported cures. He observed that sailors given citrus fruits fared much better than others. In 1753, he published his findings in a large volume entitled "Treatise on the Scurvy". Despite clear evidence, Lind's findings were largely ignored until after his death.

In 1768, James Cook was chosen to captain a fleet to explore the South Pacific. By his return to England in 1775, not a single of Cook’s sailors had died from scurvy, though many had died from other causes. The exact cause of this feat was unclear. Sir John Pringle, an influential member of the Royal Society, believed that Cook's crew was protected by the use of wort of malt, which in fact does not contain any Vitamin C. Bown stated that:

...the Thirteen Colonies and their allies in the War of American Independence owe their success against Britain to the overweening, stubborn pride, or wilful blindness, of Sir John Pringle, who influenced the Admiralty in favour of an antiscorbutic regimen that had little effect in reducing scurvy, which in turn severely weakened the strength of the Royal Navy.

By 1780, Gilbert Blane served as Physician of the Fleet. Blane read the works of Lind and Cook, after which he recommended supplying ships with fresh citrus fruits. By the end of the American Revolution in 1783, the death rate on Blane’s ships decreased from one in seven to one in twenty. Bown attributes Britain’s victory at the Battle of the Saintes to the lower rates of scurvy among British troops. In 1795, Blane was appointed to the Sick and Hurt Board, where he successfully lobbied the Admiralty to issue lemon juice as a daily ration for all sailors. This essentially cured scurvy within the British Navy.

As part of the Napoleonic Wars, Britain blockaded French ships. Bown states that the efficacy of lemon juice allowed British ship to stay at sea long enough for an effective blockade. By the time of the Battle of Trafalgar in 1805, British troops had much lower rates of scurvy than French and Spanish seamen. Bown attributes the British victory, in part, to this health differential.

By the early twentieth century, advances in medical science allowed scientists to understand the true nature of scurvy for the first time. Between 1907 and 1912, Axel Holst and Theodor Frølich induced and then eliminated scurvy in guinea pigs, proving a nutritional cause. In 1932, Albert Szent-Gyorgyi isolated ascorbic acid. In 1933, a Swiss team headed by Tadeus Reichstein and an English team headed by Norman Haworth concurrently discovered the structure of Vitamin C. In 1937, Szent-Gyorgyi was awarded a Nobel Prize in Physiology and Medicine and Haworth was awarded a Nobel Prize in Chemistry, partly for their work on vitamin C.

== Reception and awards ==
Publishers Weekly wrote that Bown "tells the story well" and praised the vivid descriptions of shipboard life, including the difficulty living conditions. Kirkus Reviews stated that the book was a "spirited, stimulating account" of the history of scurvy. The review praised Bown's "fleet prose" and called the book a "splendid popular history."

In the Journal of Clinical Investigation, Noah Raizman wrote that Bown used a "smart but often sensational tone," not sparing on blood and guts. According to the review, Bown directed "a few less-than-subtle jabs" at fellow historian Dava Sobel and the book Longitude. Bown posits that a citrus-based cure for scurvy is of more importance than the calculation of accurate longitude in terms of historical importance.
