= Thornville, North Yorkshire =

Civil parish in North Yorkshire, England

Coordinates: 53.986°N 1.307°W

Thornville
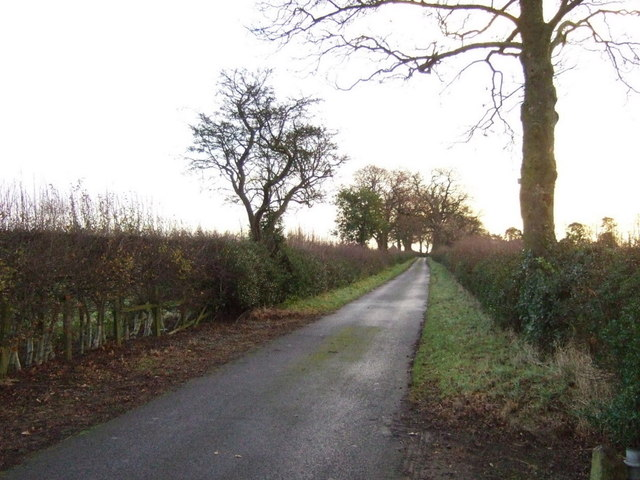
- Track to Old Thornville

- Location within North Yorkshire
- Population: 10 (2015 estimate)
- Civil parish: Thornville
- Unitary authority: North Yorkshire
- Ceremonial county: North Yorkshire
- Region: Yorkshire and the Humber
- Country: England
- Sovereign state: United Kingdom

Thornville is a civil parish on the River Nidd in North Yorkshire, England. In 2015 the parish had an estimated population of 10. The parish touches Cattal, Kirk Hammerton and Tockwith.

A village of Catala was recorded in the Domesday Book, which has been identified with Thornville. It is recorded as a deserted medieval village, although the manor house survived and is now Old Thornville, the main settlement in the parish. The modern name was probably devised by William Thornton.

In 1858, Thornville was a detached portion of the parish of Whixley, later becoming a parish in its own right. From 1974 to 2023 it was part of the Borough of Harrogate, it is now administered by the unitary North Yorkshire Council.

The parish is governed by a parish meeting.

== See also ==
- Listed buildings in Thornville, North Yorkshire
