= Sir Charles Turner, 1st Baronet, of Kirkleatham =

British politician

Sir Charles Turner Bt
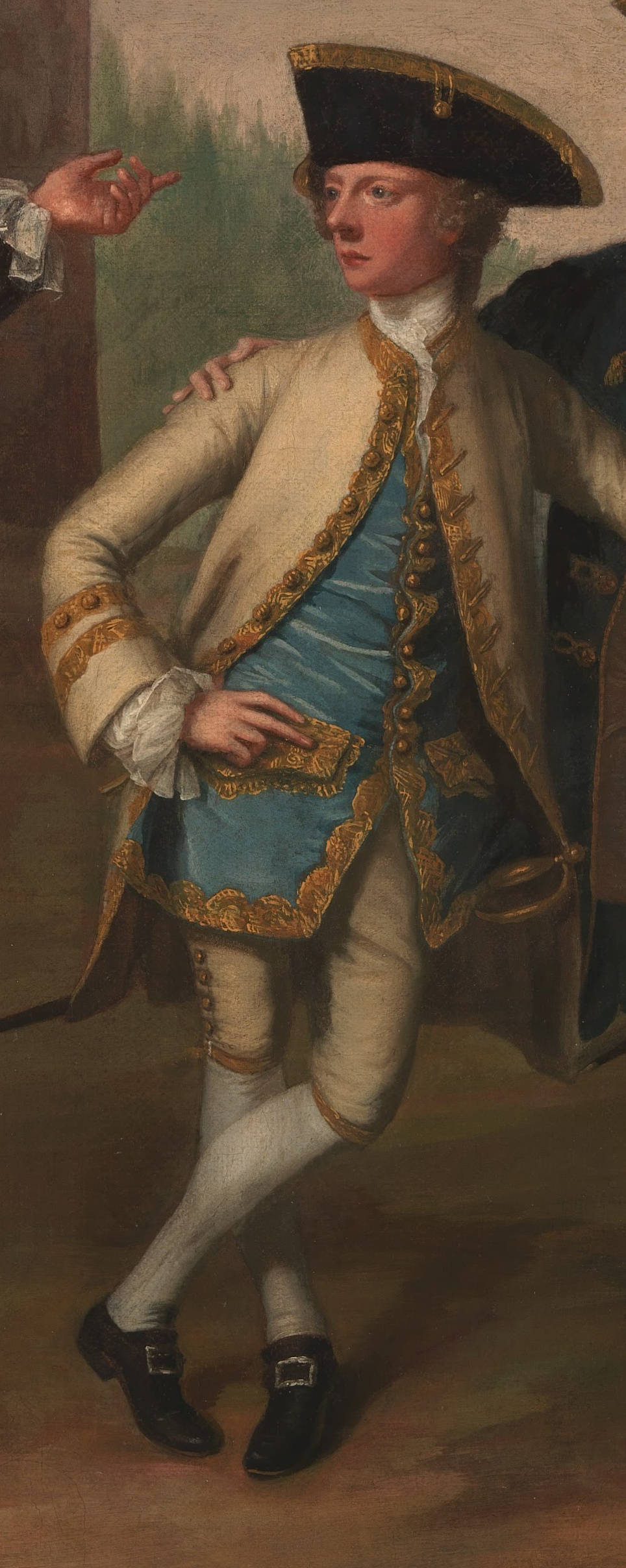
- Portrait by Catharine Read, c. 1750

Member of Parliament for York
- In office 1768–1783 Serving with Lord John Cavendish
- Prime Minister: Charles Grey, 2nd Earl Grey
- Preceded by: Sir George Armytage, Bt; Robert Fox-Lane
- Succeeded by: The Viscount Galway; Lord John Cavendish

Personal details
- Born: 5 November 1727 Kirkleatham, in present day Redcar and Cleveland, England
- Died: 26 October 1783 (aged 55) Kirkleatham
- Spouses: Elizabeth Wombwell (died) Mary Shuttleworth (m. 1771)
- Parent(s): Jane Bathurst; William Turner
- Education: Beverley Grammar School
- Alma mater: Trinity College, Cambridge

Sir Charles Turner, 1st Baronet (11 November 1727 – 26 October 1783) was a British politician and Lord Mayor of York.

== Early life ==
Turner was the son and heir of Jane (née Bathurst) Turner and William Turner, of Kirkleatham, in present-day Redcar and Cleveland, England. His father was the second son of Charles Turner and his mother was the daughter of Charles Bathurst, Esq. of York. Along with his aunts, Mary (née Bathurst) Sleigh and Frances (née Bathurst) Forster, his mother was the heiress of her brother, Charles Bathurst, Esq. of Skutterskelfe Hall and Arkendale.

He was educated at Beverley Grammar School, and admitted to the Inner Temple in 1744; he also entered Trinity College, Cambridge in 1745.

== Career ==
He was High Sheriff of Yorkshire for 1759 to 1760. From 21 March 1768 to 17 November 1783, he was Member of Parliament for York. He was Lord Mayor of York for 1772.

Turner was created Baronet, 8 May 1782.

== Personal life ==
He married twice: firstly to Elizabeth Wombwell, a daughter of William Wombwell, Esq. of Wombwell. After her death, he married, secondly, to Mary Shuttleworth, a daughter of James Shuttleworth, Esq. of Forcett, in 1771. Together, they were the parents of one son and two daughters, including:

- Sir Charles Turner, 2nd Baronet (1773–1810), who married Teresa Gleadowe-Newcomen, the daughter of Sir William Gleadowe-Newcomen, 1st Baronet and Charlotte Gleadowe-Newcomen, 1st Viscountess Newcomen.
- Mary Turner (d. 1815), who married Richard Oliver Gascoigne, of Parlington Hall.
- Elizabeth Turner, who married Col. Campbell, and were the parents of one daughter, Thomasina Campbell.

He lived at Kirkleatham Hall, and was 57 when he died on 26 October 1783. His son Charles inherited his baronetcy and the Kirkleatham estate. His widow remarried Sir Thomas Gascoigne, 8th Baronet of Parlington Hall, Aberford and their daughter Mary inherited the Gascoigne's Parlington estate. After his sons death at age 37 in 1810, the baronetcy became extinct.

=== Descendants ===
Through his daughter Mary, he was grandfather of four, including Thomas Oliver-Gascoigne (1806–1842) and Richard Silver Oliver-Gascoigne (1808–1842), who both died unmarried. The Gascoigne estates were, therefore, inherited by his two granddaughters: Mary Isabella Oliver-Gascoigne (1810–1891), who was married Col. Hon. Frederick Charles Trench in 1850 (parents of Col. F. R. T. Trench-Gascoigne) and Elizabeth Oliver-Gascoigne (1812–1893), who married Frederick Mason Trench, 2nd Baron Ashtown in 1852.

Parliament of Great Britain
Preceded by Sir George Armytage, Bt; Robert Fox-Lane	Member of Parliament for York; 1768–1783; With: Lord John Cavendish	Succeeded by The Viscount Galway; Lord John Cavendish
Baronetage of Great Britain
New creation	Baronet (of Kirkleatham); 1782–1783	Succeeded by Charles Turner
