= Sir Charles Turner, 2nd Baronet =

English politician

Sir Charles Turner, 2nd Baronet (28 January 1773 –1 February 1810) was an English politician.

He was the son of Sir Charles Turner, Bt of Kirkleatham Hall, Yorkshire by his second wife Mary, the daughter of James Shuttleworth of Gawthorpe Hall.

He joined the Army as a Cornet in the Royal Horse Guards in 1789, was a lieutenant in 1794-5 and became a captain in the 4th West Yorkshire militia in 1797.

He was elected at the 1796 general election as a Member of Parliament (MP) for Kingston upon Hull, and held the seat until the 1802 general election.

He died in 1810 aged only 37, leaving his Kirkleatham estate to his widow. He had married Teresa, the daughter of Sir William Gleadowe-Newcomen, 1st Baronet. She later married Henry Vansittart, the High Sheriff of Yorkshire for 1820.

Parliament of Great Britain
Preceded by Earl of Burford; Samuel Thornton	Member of Parliament for Kingston upon Hull; 1796 – 1800; With: Samuel Thornton	Succeeded by Parliament of the United Kingdom
Parliament of the United Kingdom
Preceded by Parliament of Great Britain	Member of Parliament for Kingston upon Hull; 1801 – 1802; With: Samuel Thornton	Succeeded by John Staniforth; Samuel Thornton
Baronetage of Great Britain
Preceded by Charles Turner	Baronet (of Kirkleatham); 1783–1810	Extinct
