= Kaye baronets of Woodesham (1642) =

Escutcheon of Kaye of Woodsome

The Kaye baronetcy, of Woodesham in the County of York, was created in the Baronetage of England on 4 February 1642 for John Kaye of Woodsome Hall, Almondbury, Yorkshire. He was a colonel of the Horse in the service of King Charles I during the Civil War. His title was forfeit under the Parliamentarian rule, but was restored after the return of the monarchy in 1660.

The 2nd and 3rd Baronets represented Yorkshire in the House of Commons. The 4th Baronet represented York and served as Mayor of York. He was also known as a Jacobite supporter. The 5th baronet was sheriff of Yorkshire in 1761. The title became extinct on the death in 1809 of the sixth Baronet, who was Dean of Lincoln.

== Kaye baronets, of Woodesham (1642) ==
- Sir John Kaye, 1st Baronet (1616–1662)
- Sir John Kaye, 2nd Baronet (c. 1641–1706)
- Sir Arthur Kaye, 3rd Baronet (c. 1670–1726)
- Sir John Lister Kaye, 4th Baronet (1697–1752)
- Sir John Lister Kaye, 5th Baronet (1725–1789)
- Very Revd. Sir Richard Kaye, 6th Baronet (1736–1809)

Escutcheon of the Lister-Kaye baronets of Woodesham
