= Charles Paine (disambiguation) =

Charles Paine was a politician.

Charles Paine may also refer to:

- Charles Paine (artist) (1895–1967), British artist, illustrator and designer
- Charles C. Paine (1824–1907), American politician
- Charles Jackson Paine (1833–1916), American railroad executive, soldier, and yachtsman
- Charles Hamilton Paine, partner in Paine Webber asset management

== See also ==
- Charles Payne (disambiguation)
