= Sir Arthur Kaye, 3rd Baronet =

English Tory politician

Sir Arthur Kaye, 3rd Baronet (c. 1670–1726), of Woodsome Hall, near Huddersfield, Yorkshire, was an English Tory politician who sat in the House of Commons from 1710 to 1726.

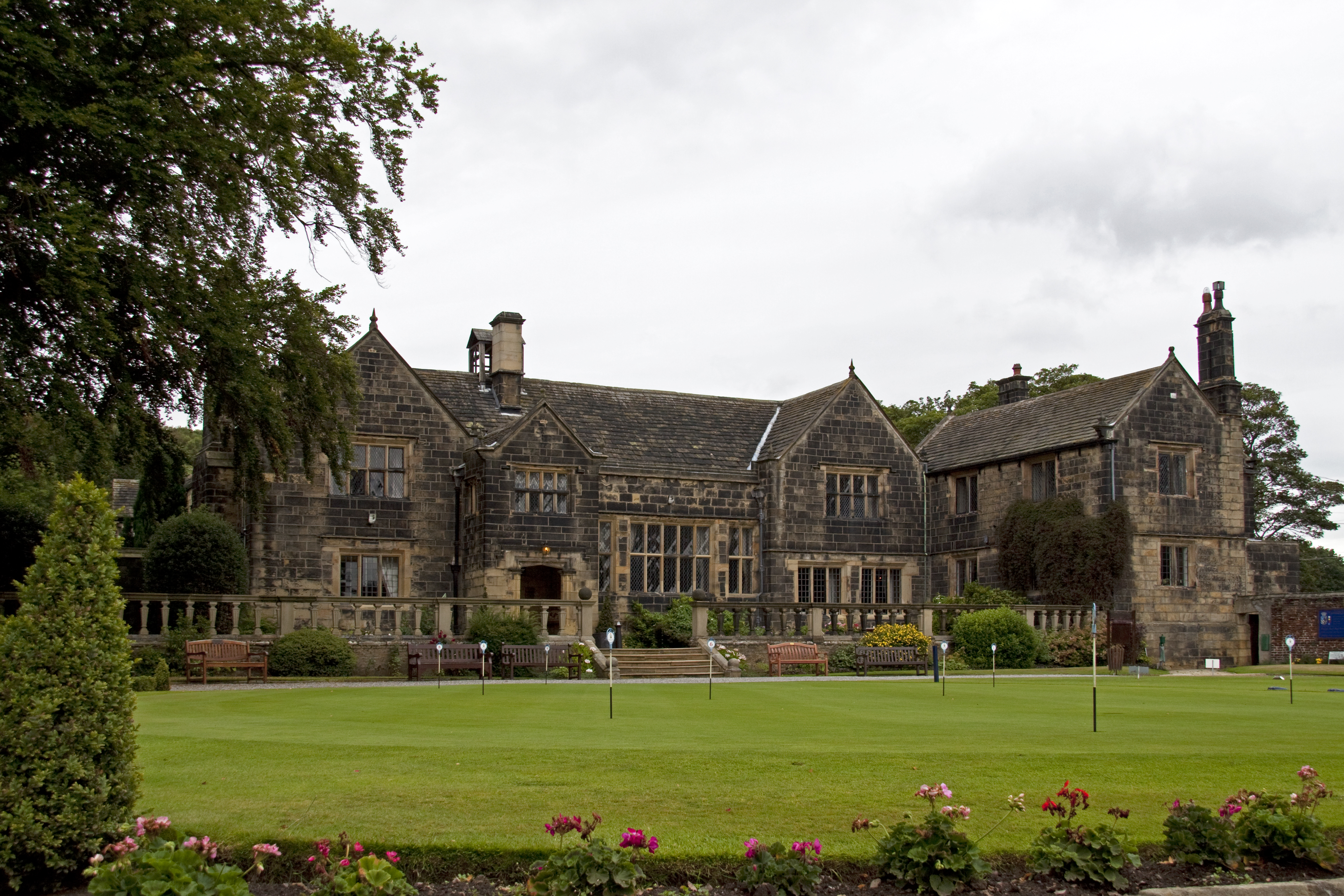
Woodsome Hall - seat of the Kaye family

Kaye was born about 1670, the third but eldest surviving son of Sir John Kaye, 2nd Baronet. He matriculated at Christ Church, Oxford on 2 March 1686, aged 15. He succeeded his father in the baronetcy on 8 August 1706.

Kaye was elected Member of Parliament (MP) for Yorkshire at the 1710 general election and was returned there unopposed in 1713. He was returned unopposed for Yorkshire again at the 1715 and 1722 general elections.

Kaye died on 10 July 1726, leaving one daughter, Elizabeth, who married George Legge, Viscount Lewisham, the heir of the 1st Earl of Dartmouth. Viscount Legge died soon afterwards in 1732, to be succeeded in turn by his eldest son, William Legge, 2nd Earl of Dartmouth. Kaye was and succeeded in the baronetcy by his nephew, John Lister Kaye, 4th Baronet.

Parliament of Great Britain
Preceded by Henry Dawnay; Sir William Strickland, Bt	Member of Parliament for Yorkshire; 1710– 1726; With: Henry Dawnay	Succeeded by Henry Dawnay; Cholmley Turner
Baronetage of England
Preceded by John Kaye	Baronet (of Woodesham); 1706-1726	Succeeded by John Lister Kaye
