= Listed buildings in Thornville, North Yorkshire =

Thornville is a civil parish in the county of North Yorkshire, England. It contains six listed buildings that are recorded in the National Heritage List for England. Of these, one is listed at Grade II*, the middle of the three grades, and the others are at Grade II, the lowest grade. The most important building in the parish is the country house, Old Thornville, and all the other listed buildings are structures associated with it in its garden and grounds.

== Key ==
Grade	Criteria
II*	Particularly important buildings of more than special interest
II	Buildings of national importance and special interest

== Buildings ==
Name and location	Photograph	Date	Notes	Grade
Gate piers north of Old Thornville; 53.98648°N 1.30562°W	—	17th century (possible)	The gate piers have a square plan, and consist of a brick shaft with sunken square panels decorated with cobbles. Each pier has a stone cap and a ball finial.	II
Old Thornville; 53.98636°N 1.30562°W	—	Mid to late 17th century	A large country house in red brick with a hipped stone slate roof. It has a square plan around a courtyard, with a south front of two and three storeys and six bays. The front has a floor band, an eaves band, and a parapet with coping and eleven ball finials. The doorway has Tuscan columns with a hood, and a fanlight, and the windows are sashes with gauged brick arches.	II*
Ha-ha south of Old Thornville; 53.98603°N 1.30552°W	—	18th century	The ha-ha enclosing the garden to the south of the house is rendered and is about 1.5 metres (4 ft 11 in) in height. It has a projecting coping band, and there are stone blocks built into the face to form steps at the south.	II
Statue of Apollo; 53.98626°N 1.30565°W	—	18th century	The statue in the garden to the south of Old Thornville is in lead on a stone plinth. It has a square base with a cornice, and depicts a classical male figure.	II
Statue of Diana; 53.98627°N 1.30553°W	—	18th century	The statue in the garden to the south of Old Thornville is in lead on a stone plinth. It has a square base with a cornice, and depicts a classical female figure.	II
Sundial and pedestal 53.98617°N 1.30573°W	—	18th or 19th century	The sundial in the garden to the south of Old Thornville consists of a stone and metal cylindrical shaft on a square base. On the top is a square cap containing a dial.	II
