= Canada's National History Society =

- Canada's History Society Logo
- Formation: 1994; 32 years ago
- Founder: Hudson Bay Company
- Founded at: Winnipeg, Manitoba, Canada
- Type: Charitable Organization
- Headquarters: Winnipeg, Manitoba, Canada
- Website: http://www.canadashistory.ca

Canada's National History Society is a charitable organization based in Winnipeg, Manitoba, Canada. The society was founded in 1994 by the Hudson's Bay Company (HBC) for the purpose of promoting greater popular interest in Canadian history principally through its publishing activities and outreach and recognition programs. The society receives a core grant from the Hudson's Bay Company History Foundation annually, but operates as an independent entity. Its operating budget averages $2.7 million a year, and its largest share of revenues comes from its membership who in addition to subscribing to their magazines also contribute charitable donations. 66% of total annual revenues come from individual subscriptions and donations.

From 2007 to 2009 it partnered with HBC to administer the HBC Local History Grants Program which provided modest support to small community-based history projects. Today the society continues to support local history organizations through the Canada's History Awards program as well as its website's news and travel services.

== Publications ==
=== Canada's History' magazine ===
Its flagship product is Canada's History magazine (until 2010 known as The Beaver: Canada's History Magazine). Produced six times a year with a current paid subscriber/membership base of 44,000. In 2017 Canada's History released an archive of the back catalogue of The Beaver.

=== Kayak' magazine ===
In addition, the History Society launched Kayak: Canada's History Magazine for Kids in 2003 which now published quarterly in English and in French as an insert to Quebec children's magazine Les Editions Les Debrouillards. Paid circulation for the English edition is just under 6,000.

=== Books ===
To date, The History Society has published five books:

- For The Love of History (Random House 2005), an anthology of the collected works of the first decade of Pierre Berton Award recipients;
- Those Earlier Hills (Heritage House 2007), a collection of R.M. Patterson's articles which appeared in The Beaver magazine;
- 100 Photos That Changed Canada (2009) celebrating Canada's most memorable photographs.
- Reid, Mark, ed. (2011). 100 Days That Changed Canada. Harper Collins. ISBN 978-1443405652.
- Reid, Mark, ed. (2014). Canada's Great War Album. Harper Collins Publishers. ISBN 9781443420150.

== Awards programs ==
In addition to its publishing projects, the History Society produces Canada's History Awards, a national celebration of the country's top history honours including the Governor General's Awards for Excellence in Teaching Canadian History and the Pierre Berton Award for achievement in popular history. In 2008, the History Society established the National Forum on Canadian History as part of the annual Awards events as an opportunity to bring students, teachers, historians, museum specials, and history organizations together to discuss ways to improve formal and informal history education in Canada.

=== The Governor General's History Awards ===
The Governor General's History Awards program were established in 1996 by Canada's National History Society. The awards include a number of separate awards programs:

- The Governor General's Awards for Excellence in Teaching Canadian History
- Excellence in Museums: History Alive! award for innovative museum programming (Canadian Museums Association)
- The Sir John A. Macdonald Prize for scholarly research (The Canadian Historical Association)
- Excellence in Community Programming
- National Student Awards including: Kayak Kids' Illustrated History Challenge, The Government of Canada History Awards for Students, Aboriginal Arts & Stories, and the Experiences Canada Awards

=== Pierre Berton Award ===
Established in 1994, the Pierre Berton Award is presented annually by the Society for distinguished achievement in presenting Canadian history in an informative and engaging manner. The award program is currently known as the Governor General's History Award for Popular Media: the Pierre Berton Award. Canadian writer and historian Pierre Berton was the first recipient and agreed to lend his name to future awards. The award honours those who have introduced Canadian characters and events of the past to the national and international public.

Year	Recipient Name
2025	Mark Bourrie
2024	Stephen R. Bown
2023	Adam Bunch
2022	Thomas King
2021	Murray Sinclair
2020	Steven High
2019	Sylvia D. Hamilton
2018	Bill Waiser
2017	Daniel Francis
2016	Merna Forster
2015	Lawrence Hill
2014	Mark Zuehlke
2013	Tim Cook
2012	Dictionary of Canadian Biography
2011	J’ai la mémoire qui tourne
2010	Desmond Morton
2009	Paul Gross
2008	Great Unsolved Mysteries in Canadian History
2007	Brian McKenna
2006	Ken McGoogan
2005	Will Ferguson
2004	Jack Granatstein
2003	Charlotte Gray
2002	Canadian Society for Civil Engineering
2001	Canada: A People's History
2000	Peter C. Newman
1998	Bob Johnstone: Today in History
1997	The CRB Foundation
1996	Jacques Lacoursière
1995	James H. Gray
1994	Pierre Berton

== Arms ==
Coat of arms of Canada's National History Society

Notes
Granted 20 March 2008.
Crest
A demi-bear affronty holding in its dexter paw an eagle feather Proper.
Escutcheon
Or two canoe paddles in saltire Azure overall a candle Gules its flame Argent surmounting a maple leaf Gules.
Supporters
Two beavers Proper each gorged with a coronet erablé Argent and standing on a grassy mount Vert.
Motto
Our Past Shapes Our Future
