= Alicia Thornton =

British horsewoman (fl.1804)

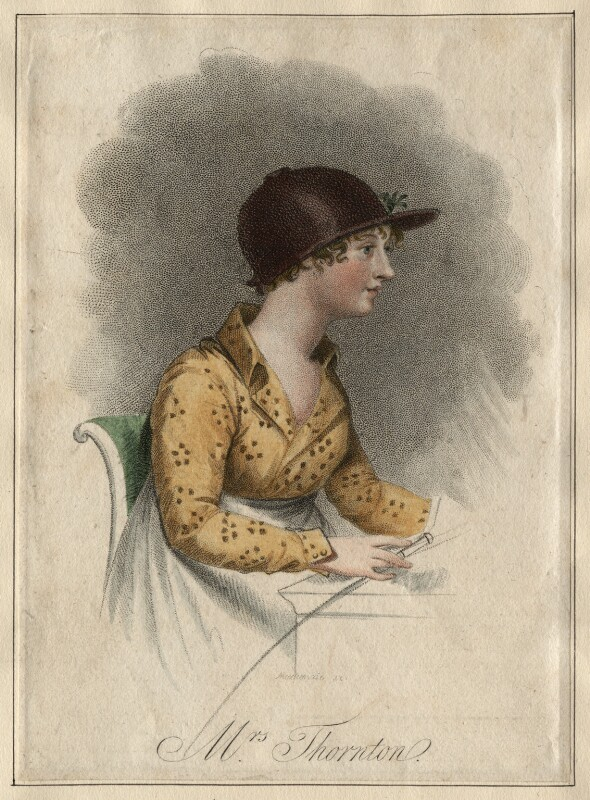
- Born: 1780s
- Died: 1800s
- Other name: Alicia Meynel
- Known for: "first woman jockey"
- Spouse: Colonel Thomas Thornton

Alicia Thornton or Alicia Meynel (1780s – 1800s) was a British horsewoman. She has been called the "first female jockey" after she took part in a horse race at what is now York Racecourse in Knavesmire in 1804.

== Life ==
Thornton's father may have made watches in Norwich or have owned land in Essex and nothing is known of her mother. She came to notice in 1804 when she challenged a man to a horse race. Some called her Alice Meynell but others Alice Thornton as it was said she was married to Colonel Thomas Thornton and he was keen on sports, horses and gambling. Others referred to her as Colonel Thornton's lady. She challenged her sister's partner (brother-in-law) and neighbour Captain Flint to a horse race. Her husband offered her his horse and placed a bet on her victory. The match race was "for 500 guineas, and 1000 guineas bye" (meaning bets). Thornton later said he believed it was 500 guineas and he had only claimed the 1,500 figure to attract a crowd.

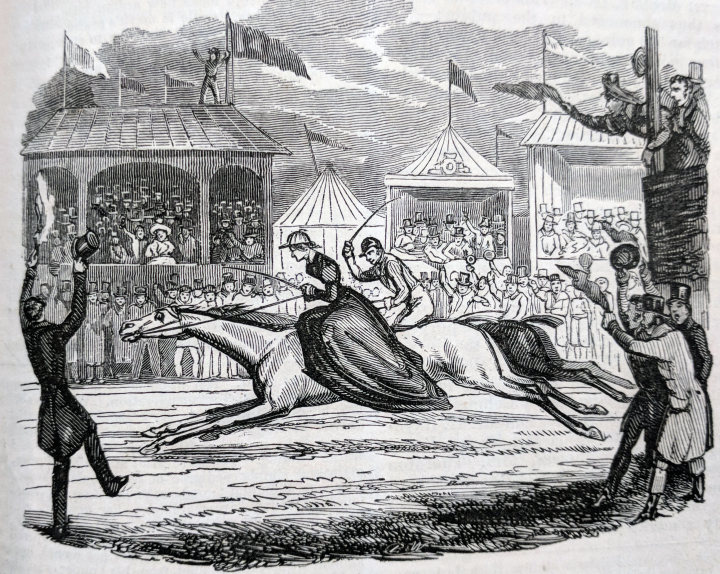
"The Gallant and Spirited Race at Knavesmire"

She was a skilled horsewoman as she rode with the hounds when they were hunting. She rode side saddle but her expertise was known to her friends.

Another celebrated sporting character was Colonel Thornton, whose wife figures as the only lady jockey ever mentioned in the Racing Calendar. Her feat is chronicled thus :— “ Saturday, August 25, 1804. Mr. Flint’s Brown Thornville, by Volunteer out of Abigail on’s ch. h. Vinagrillio, aged, rode by the owner, beat Col. Thornton’s ch. h. Vinagrillio, aged, rode by Mrs. Thornton, four miles, 500 gns.”

She has been called the "first female jockey" after she took part in a challenge horse race over a four mile course, set for the last day of the August meet at what is now York Racecourse in Knavesmire. Egan writes, "The dress of Mrs. Thornton was a leopard-coloured body with blue sleeves, the vest buff, and blue cap. Mr. Flint rode in white."

It was said that was 100,000 people watching as she held the lead for most of the four mile race. Captain Flint eventually won the race but she won the backing of the crowd with her spirited performance, attire and demeanour.
