= Edward Thompson (1697–1742) =

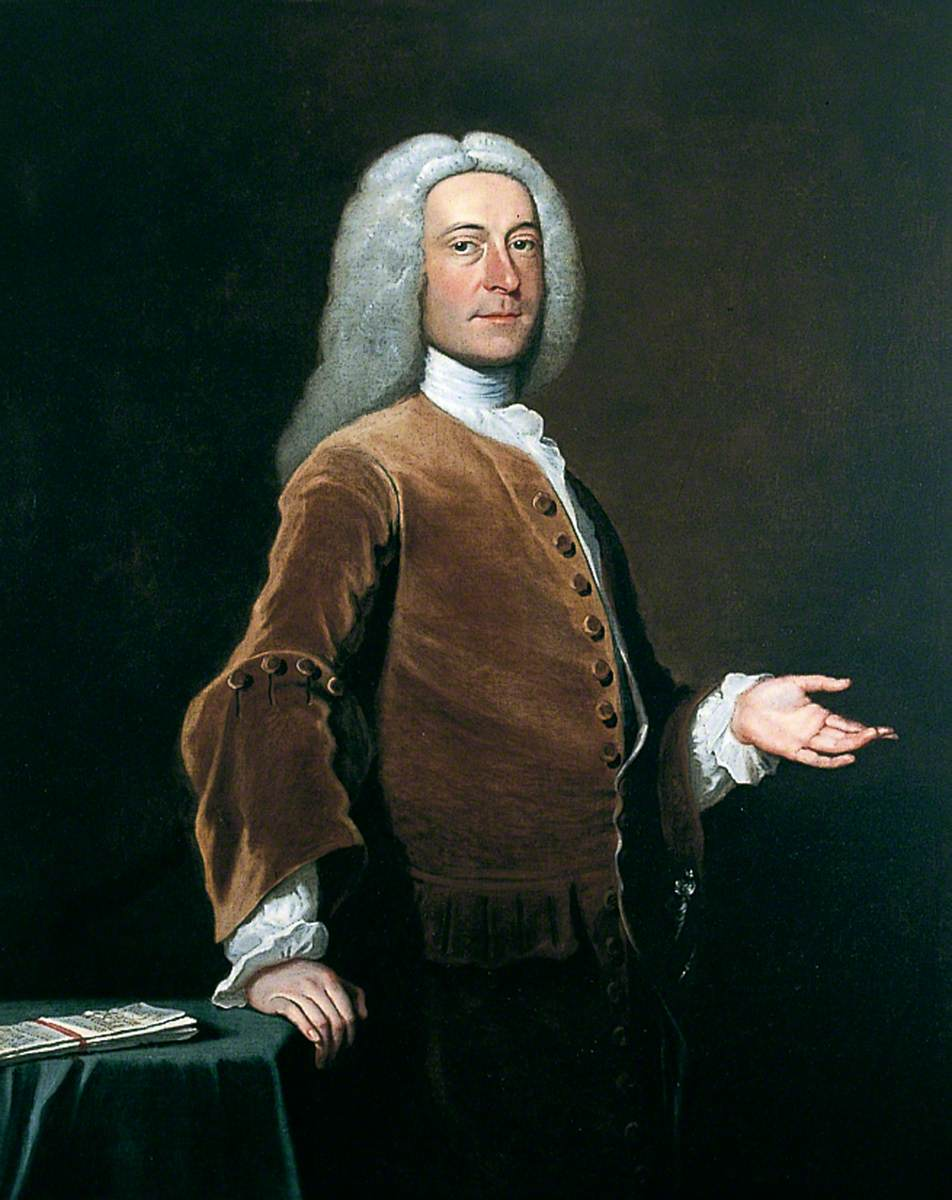
The Right Honourable Edward Thompson of Marston, painting by Joseph Highmore, 1735.

Edward Thompson (26 February 1697 – 5 July 1742) was a Yorkshire politician who sat in the House of Commons from 1722 to 1742.

== Life ==
Thompson was the son of Edward Thompson of Long Marston (1670–1734) and Lucy Tindall, and the grandson of Henry Thompson, a wine merchant of York who established the prominence of the Thompson family. His sister, Henrietta, married Colonel Edward Wolfe and became the mother of James Wolfe. He was educated at Queen Elizabeth Grammar School, Wakefield.

In 1722, Thompson was elected Member of Parliament for York, a seat he held for the remainder of his life. Employed as a Commissioner of the Land Revenue in Ireland, he issued a pamphlet justifying the introduction of a general excise there. This, and the pomp with which he carried out his office, aroused the scorn of Jonathan Swift in 1733 in a polemic against holders of civil office. From 1729 until 1733, he was Grand Master of the Grand Lodge of York.

== Family ==
Thompson first married Arabella Dunch (d. 1734), daughter of Edmund Dunch, on 6 February 1725. By her he had one daughter:

- Arabella Thompson (d. 28 February 1735).

Thompson separated from Arabella, who later bore two children to her brother-in-law Sir George Oxenden. By his second wife, Mary Moor (d. 1784), he had a second daughter:

- Mary Thompson (14 September 1738 – 29 June 1747).

On 5 May 1741, he was appointed a Commissioner of the Admiralty, but died the following year.

Parliament of Great Britain
Preceded by Sir William Robinson, Bt; Tobias Jenkins	Member of Parliament for York; 1722–1742; With: Sir William Milner, Bt 1722–1734; Sir John Lister Kaye, Bt 1734–1741; Godfrey Wentworth 1741–1742	Succeeded by Godfrey Wentworth; George Fox
