= Stephen R. Bown =

Canadian non-fiction writer

- Occupation: Writer
- Writing career
- Language: English
- Years active: 2002 - present
- Notable awards: 2021 National Business Book Award; 2024 Governor General's History Award for Popular Media
- Website: www.stephenrbown.net/index.php

Stephen R. Bown is a Canadian writer of non-fiction books. His works have received several nonfiction awards, including the 2021 National Business Book Award for The Company: The Rise and Fall of the Hudson's Bay Empire.

== Career ==
Bown's first nonfiction book, Sightseers and Scholars: Scientific Travellers in the Golden Age of Natural History, was published in 2002. As of 2026, he has published twelve non-fiction books.

Bown discussed his career in a 2017 interview with the Canadian Broadcasting Corporation. His favorite childhood book series was Cugel's Saga by Jack Vance. Bown stated that Vance's travels to Borneo and Indonesia broadened Vance's worldview, which inspired Bown to "open my mind to understand the decisions and actions of the true historical individuals that I write about."

In a 2018 interview with Read Local BC, Bown discussed his book Island of the Blue Foxes: Disaster and Triumph of the World's Greatest Scientific Expedition. Bown wrote that he wanted to focus on the intimate details of the people involved, rather than "dense historical background."

== Personal life ==
According to CBC Books, Bown is from Canmore, Alberta.

== Awards and honors ==
Bown's 2018 book Island of the Blue Foxes: Disaster and Triumph on Bering’s Great Voyage to Alaska was shortlisted for the RBC Taylor Prize. It was longlisted for British Columbia's National Award for Canadian Non-Fiction.

In 2021, Stephen Bown and Mark Carney shared the National Business Book Award. Bown received the award for his book The Company: The Rise and Fall of the Hudson’s Bay Empire. It was the first time in the award's history that two books were named winners.

In 2024, Bown received the Governor General's History Award for Popular Media, administered by Canada's National History Society.

== Bibliography ==
- Sightseers and Scholars: Scientific Travellers in the Golden Age of Natural History. Key Porter Books. 10 September 2002. ISBN 9781552634868.
- Scurvy: How a Surgeon, a Mariner, and a Gentleman Solved the Greatest Medical Mystery of the Age of Sail. Thomas Dunne Books. 17 March 2004. ISBN 9780312313913.
- A Most Damnable Invention: Dynamite, Nitrates, and the Making of the Modern World. Thomas Dunne Books. 1 October 2005. ISBN 9780312329136.
- Forgotten Highways: Wilderness Journeys Down the Historic Trails of the Canadian Rockies. Brindle & Glass Publishing. ISBN 9781897142240.
- Madness, Betrayal and the Lash: The Epic Voyage of Captain George Vancouver. Douglas & McIntyre. 5 May 2009. ISBN 9781553653394.
- Merchant Kings: When Companies Ruled the World, 1600 to 1900. Thomas Dunne Books. 7 December 2010. ISBN 9780312616113.
- 1494: How a Family Feud in Medieval Spain Divided the World in Half. Thomas Dunne Books. 14 February 2012. ISBN 9780312616120.
- The Last Viking: The Life of Roald Amundsen. Da Capo Press. 25 September 2012. ISBN 9780306820670.
- White Eskimo: Knud Rasmussen's Fearless Journey into the Heart of the Arctic. Grand Central Publishing. 10 November 2015. ISBN 9780306822827.
- Island of the Blue Foxes: Disaster and Triumph of the World's Greatest Scientific Expedition. Grand Central Publishing. 7 November 2017. ISBN 9780306825194.
- The Company: The Rise and Fall of the Hudson's Bay Empire. Doubleday Canada. 27 October 2020. ISBN 9780385694070.
- Dominion: The Railway and the Rise of Canada. Doubleday Canada. 10 October 2023. ISBN 9780385698726.
