= Brenton baronets =

Extinct baronetcy in the Baronetage of the United Kingdom

The Brenton Baronetcy, of London, was a title in the Baronetage of the United Kingdom. It was created on 24 December 1812 for the naval commander Jahleel Brenton. The title became extinct on the death of the second Baronet in 1862.

Jahleel Brenton, father of the first Baronet, was an Admiral in the Royal Navy. Edward Pelham Brenton, brother of the first Baronet, was a naval commander and writer on naval affairs.

== Brenton baronets, of London (1812) ==
- Sir Jahleel Brenton, 1st Baronet (1770–1844)
- Sir Lancelot Charles Lee Brenton, 2nd Baronet (1807–1862)

Baronetage of the United Kingdom
Preceded by Hobhouse baronets	Brenton baronets of London; 24 December 1812	Succeeded by Blane baronets
