= Blane baronets =

Extinct baronetcy in the Baronetage of the United Kingdom

- Escutcheon of the Blane baronets of Blanefield
- Creation date: 1812
- Status: extinct
- Extinction date: 1916
- Motto: Paritur pax bello, Peace is produced by war

The Blane Baronetcy, of Blanefield in the County of Ayr, was a title in the Baronetage of the United Kingdom. It was created on 26 December 1812 for the Scottish physician Gilbert Blane, known for his reforms in naval hygiene and medicine.

The third baronet was succeeded by his nephew, son of his brother Capt. Arthur Rodney Blane. All three of Arthur Rodney Blane's sons were killed on active duty during the First World War within a span of 18 months. Captain James Pitcairn Blane (27 May 1883 – 23 November 1915) and Lt. Hugh Seymour Blane (2 February 1885 – 1 November 1914) both died in Belgium of wounds received; the title became extinct on the death of the fourth Baronet, who was killed in action 31 May 1916 while serving aboard HMS Queen Mary during the Battle of Jutland.

== Blane baronets, of Blanefield (1812) ==
- Sir Gilbert Blane, 1st Baronet (1749–1834)
- Sir Hugh Seymour Blane, 2nd Baronet (1795–1869)
- Sir Seymour John Blane, CB, 3rd Baronet (1833–1911).
- Sir Charles Rodney Blane, 4th Baronet (1879–1916)

Baronetage of the United Kingdom
Preceded by Brenton baronets	Blane baronets of Blanefield; 26 December 1812	Succeeded by Kaye baronets
