= Canada's History =

Canadian history magazine formerly known as The Beaver

- Editorial Director: Jacqueline Kovacs
- Categories: History
- Frequency: Bi-Monthly
- Total circulation: 37,689 (2011)
- First issue: October 1920 (as The Beaver); April 2010 (as Canada's History)
- Company: Canada's National History Society
- Country: Canada
- Based in: Winnipeg, Manitoba
- Language: English
- Website: www.canadashistory.ca

Canada's History (French: Histoire Canada) is the official magazine of Canada's National History Society (CNHS). It is published four times a year and aims to foster greater popular interest in Canadian history.

Founded as The Beaver in 1920 by the Hudson's Bay Company (HBC), the magazine was acquired by CNHS in 1994. It remains partially funded by HBC and the Government of Canada. Subject matter includes all aspects of Canadian history. In 2011, it was named a finalist for "Magazine of the Year" at the National Magazine Awards.

The youth edition of the magazine is called Kayak: Canada’s History Magazine for Kids (French: Kayak: Navigue dans l’histoire du Canada).

== History ==
The Beaver was founded in 1920 as part of the Hudson's Bay Company's 250th anniversary celebrations. It was seen as a staff publication "devoted to the Interests of Those Who Serve the Hudson's Bay Company."

The first issue appeared in October 1920, under the banner, The Beaver, A Journal of Progress—the "successful name" in a staff competition. Five thousand copies were printed and distributed at a total cost of $570.

According to Charles Sale, who became the 29th Governor of HBC, there was a "purely personal and domestic character" to the initial magazine. Sale felt this approach was too narrow. He envisioned The Beaver as "one of exceeding use to ...Staff; but also a publication that could ...be distributed to customers to their benefit and is, at the same time a practical reminder (through advertising) of the Company's existence and of the goods which it offers."

Beginning with the December 1923 issue, the company began offering the magazine to non-Hudson's Bay employees at a rate of one dollar a year – a rate still in effect well into the '30s. The following year, the magazine ceased being a monthly publication and became a quarterly.

Significant changes took place in 1933 with the September issue. The original digest format was replaced by a standard magazine design. The magazine also re-focussed its content, transitioning from "A Journal of Progress" to "A Magazine of the North."

=== From digest to magazine ===
The content of the new Beaver was broadened to "include the whole field of travel, exploration and the trade in the Canadian North as well as the current activities and historical background of the Hudson's Bay Company and all its departments throughout Canada." Staff news was de-emphasized and would be handled by other company publications. Over the next 50 years, the magazine came into its stride. The Beaver came to offer a wealth of information on Canada's social, cultural, economic and commercial past. Some of Canada's leading historians have written for the magazine including:

- Pierre Berton
- Michael Bliss
- Donald Creighton
- Desmond Morton
- Peter C. Newman
- Veronica Strong-Boag

The Beaver was also one of the first magazines to publish the works of wildlife artist Clarence Tillenius and Arctic photographer Richard Harrington.

In 1986, The Beaver became a bimonthly magazine. The publisher also decided to break with tradition and expand the focus of the magazine to include all Canadian history—introducing Atlantic and Central Canadian stories for the first time. This was reflected by the creation of a new masthead: "Exploring Canada's History."

=== Acquisition by Canada's National History Society ===
Canada's History in its former title

In 1994, Canada's National History Society was founded; that same year, it acquired The Beaver from the Hudson's Bay Company.

While still named The Beaver, the masthead carried a new slogan: "Canada's History Magazine," and continued to publish a bimonthly mix of features, columns, reviews, notes and commentary. Under the leadership of the History Society the magazine modernized its production and promotion programs.

In 2004, the Society launched its "baby" edition, Kayak: Canada's History Magazine for Kids, with a French version available quarterly as an insert in Les Debrouillards. The magazine aims to show Canadian history in a way that children find engaging, relevant and fun.

Access to the full Beaver archive was achieved through the creation of an online index. With close to 15,000 records entered, visitors can conduct searches free-of-charge and read over five decades of articles. The creation of the index made it possible to participate in the Canadian Content Online Program and use The Beaver archive to highlight Canada's fur trade history with the digital project Fur Trade Stories.

=== 2010 title change ===
Since the April–May 2010 issue, the magazine has been renamed Canada's History. At the time of the name change, the magazine was in the process of redesigning its website, and also, rebranding its publishing activities. The name change was enacted in order to unify both the print and online banners under a single Canada's History brand. The fact that there has been some confusion by people believing that the publication is a nature magazine was also cited, as well as the use of the word "beaver" in slang to refer to a vagina, which would often result in promotional emails from the magazine being sent to the spam folder.

American news satirist Stephen Colbert poked fun at the decision to change the title.

== Kayak magazine ==
Kayak: Canada’s History Magazine for Kids (French: Kayak: Navigue dans l’histoire du Canada) is the youth edition of Canada's History, meant for readers aged 7 to 12 years old. As of May 2021, the editor of this magazine is Nancy Payne.

Launched in 2004, it is now published 3 times a year in English and French and distributed to educators freely while supplies last. Individual digital subscriptions are also available.
