= Kaye baronets of Grange (1812) =

Escutcheon of the Lister-Kaye baronets of Grange

The Kaye, later Lister-Kaye baronetcy, of Grange in the County of York, was created in the Baronetage of the United Kingdom on 28 December 1812 for John Lister Kaye. He was the illegitimate son and heir of the 5th Baronet of the 1642 creation.

The 2nd Baronet assumed the additional surname of Lister. The 8th Baronet is a writer on nature and environmental issues.

== Kaye, later Lister-Kaye baronets, of Grange (1812) ==
- Sir John Lister Kaye, 1st Baronet (1772–1827)
- Sir John Lister Lister-Kaye, 2nd Baronet (1801–1871)
- Sir John Pepys Lister-Kaye, 3rd Baronet (1853–1924)
- Sir Cecil Edmund Lister-Kaye, 4th Baronet (1854–1931)
- Sir Kenelm Arthur Lister-Kaye, 5th Baronet (1892–1955)
- Sir Lister Lister-Kaye, 6th Baronet (1873–1962)
- Sir John Christopher Lister Lister-Kaye, 7th Baronet (1913–1982)
- Sir John Philip Lister Lister-Kaye, 8th Baronet (born 1946)

The heir apparent to the baronetcy is John Warwick Noel Lister-Kaye (born 1974), only son of the 8th Baronet.

== Notes ==
Baronetage of the United Kingdom
Preceded by Blane baronets	Kaye baronets of Grange; 28 December 1812	Succeeded by Ormsby baronets
