= George Fox-Lane, 1st Baron Bingley =

British peer and Tory politician

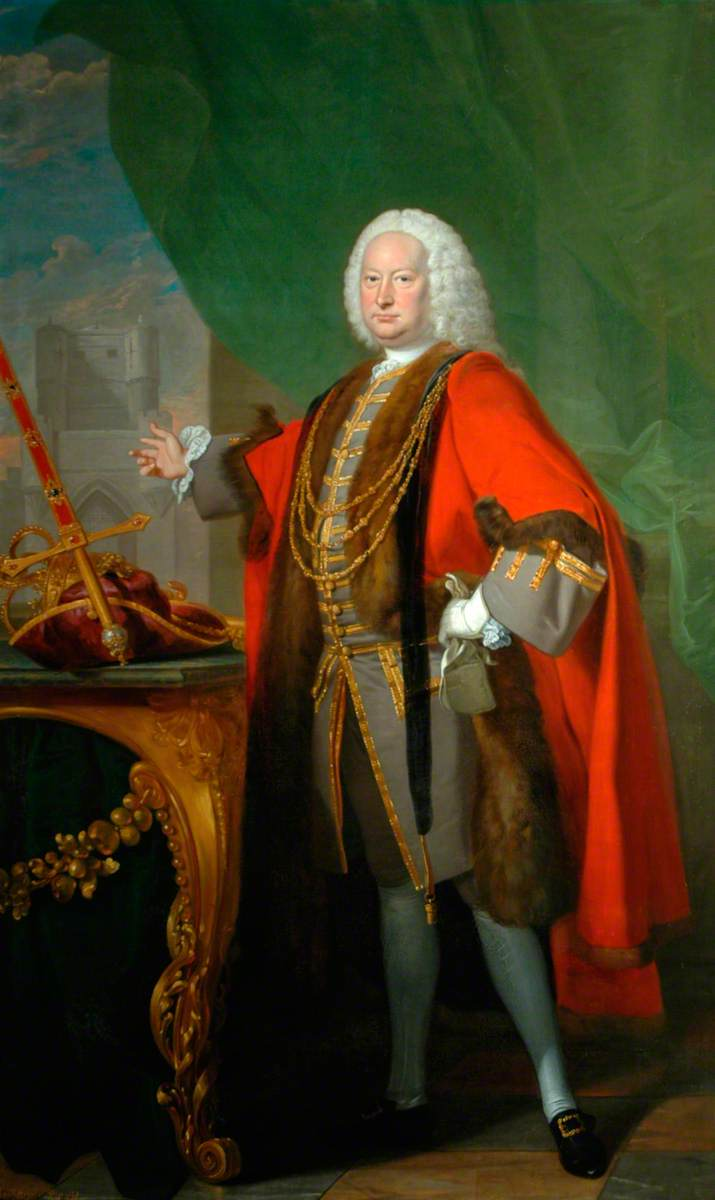
George Fox-Lane, Lord Bingley, as Lord Mayor of York in 1757, painting by Thomas Hudson, 1758.

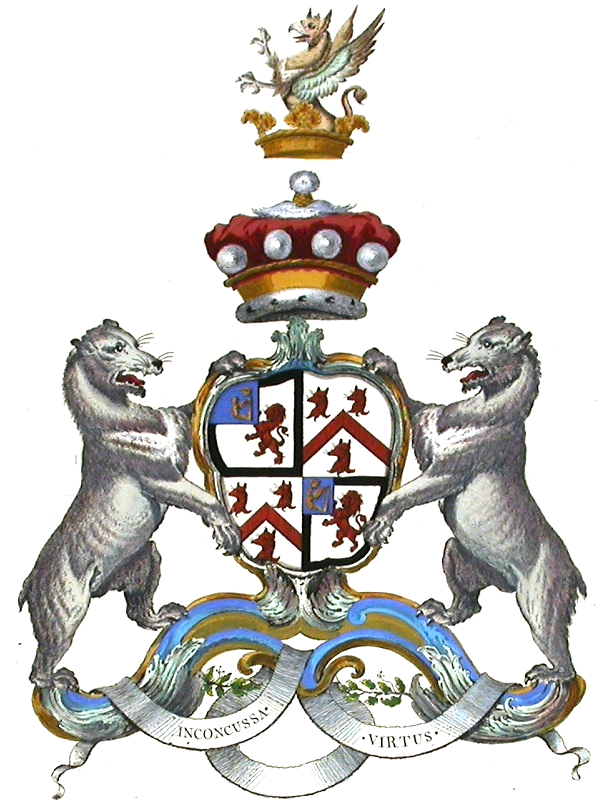
The coat of arms of Lord Bingley.

George Fox-Lane, 1st Baron Bingley (c. 1697 – 22 February 1773) was a British peer and Tory politician.

== Early life ==
Born George Fox, he was the first son and heir of Henry Fox and his second wife, Frances Bourke, Viscountess Galway (née Hon. Frances Lane). His elder brother was Sackville Fox, father of James Fox-Lane, MP for Horsham. His mother was the widow of Ulick Bourke, 1st Viscount Galway (a son of William Burke, 7th Earl of Clanricarde), an Irish army officer who was killed at the Battle of Aughrim while fighting for the Jacobites during the Williamite War in Ireland.

His maternal grandparents were George Lane, 1st Viscount Lanesborough and, his third wife, Lady Frances Sackville (a daughter of the 5th Earl of Dorset). His paternal grandparents were Maj. Joseph Fox of Graigue, County Tipperary and the Hon. Thomasine Blayney (a daughter of the 2nd Baron Blayney).

== Career ==
Lane's Name and Arms Act 1750
- Act of Parliament
- Parliament of Great Britain
- Long title: An Act to enable George Lane, heretofore called George Fox, Esquire, and his Issue Male, to take and use the Surname and Arms of Lane, pursuant to the Will of James Lord Viscount Lanesborough, in the Kingdom of Ireland, deceased, and for enroling the said Will, and making the Exemplification thereof Evidence in all Courts of Great Britain and Ireland.
- Citation: 24 Geo. 2. c. 7 Pr.
- Territorial extent: Great Britain

Dates
- Royal assent: 22 March 1751
- Commencement: 17 January 1751 (Note: Start of session.)

Status: Current legislation

From 1734 to 1741, he was Member of Parliament for Hindon and then for the City of York from 1742 to 1761. He took the additional name of Lane by a private act of Parliament, Lane's Name and Arms Act 1750 (24 Geo. 2. c. 7 Pr.), on succeeding to the estates of his maternal half-uncle, James Lane, 2nd Viscount Lanesborough.

On 13 May 1762, Lane-Fox's father-in-law's extinct title was re-created, when he was created Baron Bingley, of Bingley in the County of York, with remainder only to his heirs male with his wife, Harriet.

== Personal life ==
On 12 July 1731, he married Hon. Harriet Benson (c. 1705-1771), the only child of Robert Benson, 1st Baron Bingley. They were the parents of:

- Robert Fox-Lane (1732–1768), who served as Lord Mayor of York in 1757; he married twice, but had no children.

As his only son died in 1768 and his wife in 1771, the title became extinct on his own death in 1773. His estate passed to his nephew, James, who adopted Lane as an additional surname.

== Notes ==
Parliament of Great Britain
| Preceded by George Heathcote; Townsend Andrews | Member of Parliament for Hindon; 1734–1741; With: Stephen Fox 1734–1735; Henry Fox 1735–1741 | Succeeded by Henry Calthorpe; William Steele |
| Preceded by Edward Thompson; Godfrey Wentworth | Member of Parliament for the City of York; 1742–1761; With: Godfrey Wentworth 1742–1747; William Thornton 1747–1754; Sir John Armytage, Bt 1754–1758; William Thornton 1758–1761 | Succeeded by Sir George Armytage, Bt; Robert Fox-Lane |
Peerage of Great Britain
| New creation | Baron Bingley; 1762–1773 | Extinct |
