= Daniel Francis (historian) =

Canadian historian and writer

Daniel Francis (born 19 April 1947) is a Canadian historian and writer. He has published thirty books, chiefly about Canadian, British Columbian and Vancouver history, on a broad range of subjects, from the Canadian fur trade and prohibition to the history of whaling, transportation and Indigenous peoples.

In 2017, he received the Governor General's History Award for Popular Media: the Pierre Berton Award, called Canada's top honour in the field of history and heritage. In 2014, the City of Vancouver awarded him the Mayor's Arts Award for Literary Arts. In 2010, Francis received an award of merit from the Vancouver Historical Society for his contributions to the history of the city and the province.

His biography of L. D. Taylor, an early mayor of Vancouver, won the 2004 City of Vancouver Book Award. His book on the history of killer whales on the Pacific Coast, Operation Orca (Harbour), written with marine biologist Gil Hewlett, won the Foreword Magazine prize for best nature book of 2007.

The Encyclopedia of British Columbia (Harbour 2000), which he edited and wrote the majority of, has been called "the most essential book for and about B.C." In 2001, it won two awards at the annual British Columbia Book Prizes.

== Education and career ==
Francis was born in Vancouver in 1947 and educated at Lord Byng High School. After graduating with a BA from the University of British Columbia in 1969, he became a newspaper reporter at the Medicine Hat New in Medicine Hat, Alberta, and the Ottawa Journal in Ottawa, Ontario. He obtained a master's degree from the Institute of Canadian Studies at Ottawa's Carleton University in 1975 and began a career as a freelance historical researcher and writer. In 1984, he moved to Montreal to become editor of Horizon Canada, a bilingual, weekly magazine of Canadian history. When that project concluded in 1987 he returned with his family to the West Coast where he has lived ever since.

For several years he contributed a regular column on books to the literary quarterly Geist. He continues to serve as editor of the online Encyclopedia of British Columbia. In 2016, he wrote Where Mountains Meet the Sea: An Illustrated History of the District of North Vancouver (Harbour), which was published to commemorate the district's 125th anniversary.

His Becoming Vancouver: A History (2021), is the first comprehensive history of Vancouver published in fifty years. It was short-listed for both the Basil Stuart-Stubbs Book Prize for outstanding scholarly book on British Columbia, and the George Ryga Award for Social Awareness in Literature.
