= Gilbert Blane =

Scottish physician

Sir Gilbert Blane, Bt
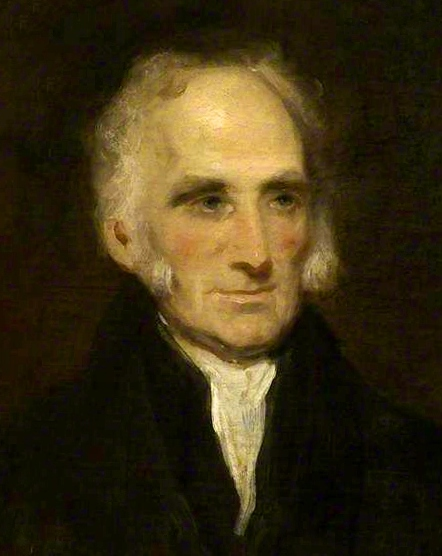
- Gilbert Blane by Martin Archer Shee, 1833
- Born: 29 August 1749; Blanefield, by Kirkoswald, Ayrshire, Scotland
- Died: 26 June 1834 (aged 84); London, England
- Education: Edinburgh University; Glasgow University (MD 1778)
- Known for: Obligatory use of lemon juice to prevent scurvy
- Scientific career
- Fields: Medicine

Sir Gilbert Blane of Blanefield, 1st Baronet FRSE FRS MRCP (29 August 1749 – 26 June 1834) was a Scottish medical doctor who instituted health reform in the Royal Navy. He saw action against both the French and Spanish fleets, and later served as a Commissioner on the Sick and Wounded Board of the Admiralty. He was President of the Medical and Chirurgical Society of London in 1813.

== Life ==
Born in Blanefield, by Kirkoswald, in Ayrshire, he was the fourth son of Gilbert Blane of Blanefield (d.1771) and Agnes McFadzen.

He studied medicine at Edinburgh University and Glasgow University (MD 1778) before moving to London. The challenge of establishing a practice in London was eased by his friendship with Dr William Hunter, elder brother of the famous John Hunter who is now widely regarded as the father of modern surgery in Britain. Dr William Hunter introduced Blane to Lord Rodney who appointed Blane as his personal physician aboard HMS Sandwich.

Blane was appointed Physician to the Fleet (1779–1783) and accompanied Rodney, initially to pursue the Spanish squadron besieging Gibraltar and engaging them at the Battle of Cape St. Vincent, and then to the West Indies. Blane did much to improve the health of sailors by improving their diet and enforcing proper sanitary precautions. He demanded monthly reports from other ships' surgeons which enabled him to build up a detailed picture of the high levels of sickness that affected the squadron. Despite James Lind's 1753 publication of A treatise on scurvy, which established the importance of fresh fruit and vegetables in preventing scurvy, the Admiralty had not implemented his recommendations, and scurvy remained a significant cause of sickness in the Fleet. Blane published a pamphlet for the benefit of ships' surgeons in 1780 entitled On the most effective means for preserving the health of seamen, particularly in the Royal Navy. He advocated the use of citrus juice as a preventative and cure for scurvy in the squadron and eventually, as Commissioner of the Sick and Wounded Board, persuaded the Admiralty to go against the theories of the medical establishment and introduce lemon juice as daily addition to the naval diet in 1795. Later lemons were replaced by limes which could be obtained from Britain's Caribbean colonies, and for this reason, "limey" became a common slang word for a British person.

On his return to Britain, he became Physician to St Thomas' Hospital (1783–1795), Physician Extraordinary to the Prince of Wales (1786) and Physician in Ordinary to the King (George IV and William IV). He became a Fellow of the Royal Society in 1784 and delivered their Croonian lecture in 1788 On the Nature of the Muscles, and on the Theory of Muscular Motion. By virtue of these court and hospital appointments, he built up a good practice for himself in London, and the government constantly consulted him on questions of public hygiene. In 1795 Blane was appointed as Commissioner on the Sick and Wounded Board of the Admiralty; the provision of soap, lemons, adequate ventilation and standardised medical stores have all been attributed to his reforms. He was an instrumental advisor to the government in the drafting of the 1799 Quarantine Act. Blane left the Commission in 1802.

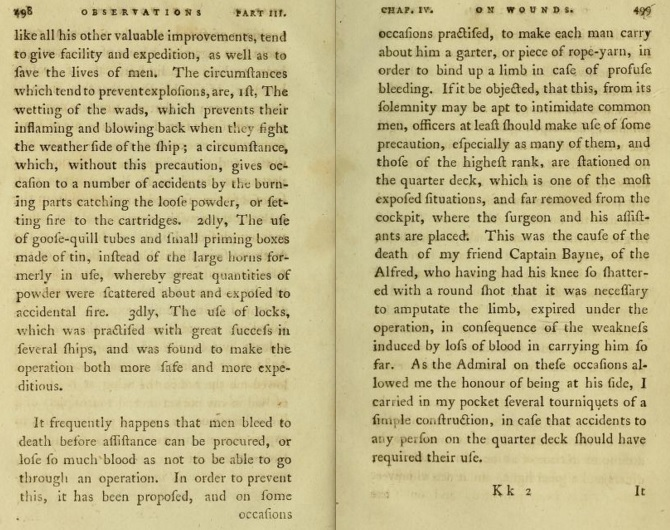
Blane advocated that each man be issued a tourniquet in battle. Observations on the diseases incident to seamen (1785), pp. 498-499

In 1809 Blane provided expert medical advice with regards to the Walcheren expedition. This involved a British occupation of Walcheren Island with 40,000 men. The island was surrounded by marshland and many troops were struck down with 'Walcheren Fever', most likely malaria. The General Staff heeded Blane's advice that the occupying forces should be evacuated due to the likelihood of sickness. As a reward for his services to the Walcheren expedition and his other naval contributions, he was made baronet of Blanefield in the County of Ayr, on 26 December 1812.

His printed works include Observations on the Diseases of Seamen (1785) and Elements of Medical Logic (1819).

He was an advocate for issuing each Royal Navy sailor with a tourniquet to stem catastrophic bleeding in battle.

Blane lived at Burghfield in Berkshire and at Kirkoswald in Ayrshire.

He was elected a member of the Institute of France in 1826.

== Controversy ==
Blane attended the anatomy course of Prof Alexander Monro Secundus when he studied medicine at Edinburgh University. Monro later accused Blane of plagiarising some of the information in publications, going so far as to write a pamphlet about the incident.

== Death ==
He died at Sackville Street in the Piccadilly area of London on 26 June 1834.

== Family ==
Blane married Elizabeth Gardiner in 1786. She died in 1832.

== The Gilbert Blane Medal ==
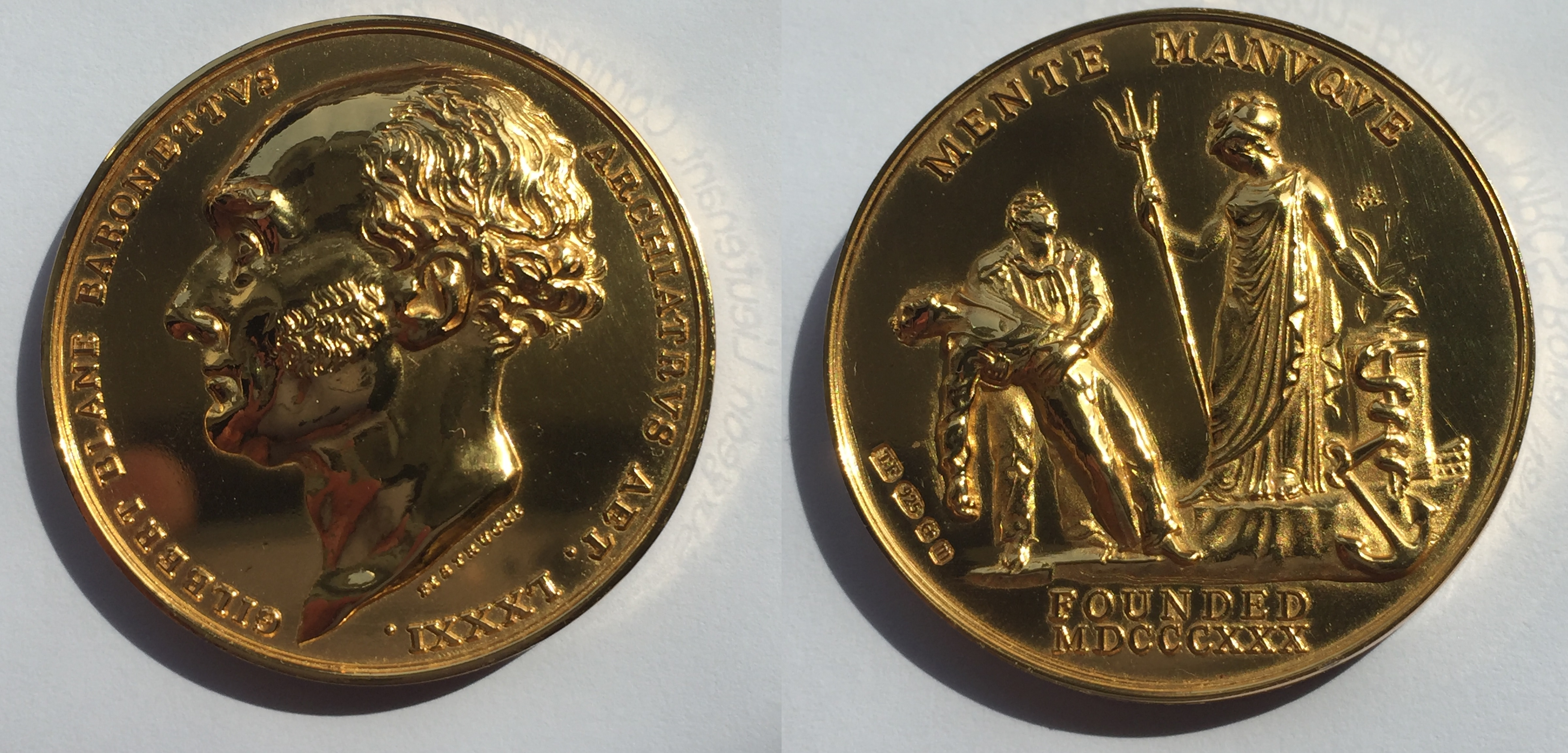
The Gilbert Blane Medal designed by Benedetto Pistrucci. The example above was awarded to Surg Lt Cdr Jowan Penn-Barwell in 2015.

In 1830 Sir Gilbert Blane established, with the sanction of the Board of the Admiralty, a fund for the encouragement of Naval Medical science, which was vested in the corporation of the Royal Colleges of Surgeons of London. The fund of £300 was to be used to confer gold medals, to be awarded jointly by the Presidents of the Royal Colleges of Physicians and Surgeons, to the Medical Officer of the Royal Navy who was judged to demonstrate "the most distinguished proofs of skill, diligence, humanity and learning in the exercise of their professional duties". The medal was designed by Benedetto Pistrucci who had designed the 1817 St George and dragon reverse of the British gold sovereign which is still used today. It is currently struck in gold-plated Sterling silver; the reverse side is inscribed with the motto 'Mente Manuque'; with mind and hand. Under the original terms, a pair of medals would be awarded biennially. Blane himself judged the first award of a pair of medals in 1832; to Dr John Liddell of HMS Asia for his preparations for the 1827 Battle of Navarino and to Dr William Donnelly of HMS Hussar for his examinations of the nature of syphilis and rheumatic fever. These were the only medals adjudicated by Blane prior to his death in 1834. In 1913 the rules of the prize were amended and the medal was to be awarded to the Medical Officer who achieved the highest mark in his professional examinations for promotion to Staff Surgeon. In 1936 the regulations were again changed to a form that remains extant to this day:

This fund is employed for the purposes of conferring a Gold Medal on the Medical Officer of the Royal Navy who, to a degree which is considered worthy of recognition, has brought about an advance in any branch of Medical Science in its application to Naval Service, or has contributed to an improvement in any matter affecting the health or living conditions of Naval personnel. In adjudicating the award of the Medal consideration will be given to achievement by Medical Officers in research, in original articles and reports; criticisms of a constructive character of existing conditions; and information which is brought to notice or work performed, or suggestions made, by Medical Officers within the scope of the regulations governing the award as stated above.

The Gilbert Blane Medal is awarded annually to this day, alternately by the Royal College of Surgeons of England and the Royal College of Physicians, upon the recommendation of the Medical Director General (Navy). The medal was last awarded in 2020 to Surgeon Commander Anton Fries, consultant plastic surgeon at Oxford University Hospitals, for his work on reconstructive transplantation surgery.

== See also ==
- Scurvy: How a Surgeon, a Mariner, and a Gentleman Solved the Greatest Medical Mystery of the Age of Sail

Baronetage of the United Kingdom
New creation	Baronet (of Blanefield); 1812–1834	Succeeded by Hugh Blane
