= Merchant Kings =

Nonfiction book by Stephen R. Bown

Merchant Kings: When Companies Ruled the World, 1600 to 1900
- Author: Stephen R. Bown
- Subject: Chartered companies, Colonialism
- Publisher: Thomas Dunne Books
- Publication date: 2009
- Pages: 336
- ISBN: 978-0312616113
- OCLC: 06785236
- Website: https://www.stephenrbown.net/merchant-kings-description.php

Merchant Kings: When Companies Ruled the World, 1600 to 1900 is a 2009 nonfiction popular history book by Stephen R. Bown, which discusses what Bown dubs the "age of heroic commerce" through biographical profiles of six of the leading "merchant kings" of the great chartered companies which held colonial trade monopolies: Jan Pieterszoon Coen of the Dutch East India Company, Pieter Stuyvesant of the Dutch West India Company, Robert Clive of the English East India Company, Alexander Baranov of the Russian American Company, George Simpson of the Hudson's Bay Company, and Cecil John Rhodes of the British South Africa Company.

Each of these companies blurred the line between corporation and state, taking on some roles of civil government over their employees, customers, and native peoples and settlers. The men who ran them operated far from the oversight and control of their home countries' governments and their companies' directors (many of whom never set foot on the territories whose commerce they profited from). These men, often from humble beginnings, grew wealthy and powerful through the activities of their companies, while serving as quasi-official representatives of their home government—roles which, Bown notes, were often at odds. They achieved their successes as much through military conquest and treachery—against their competitors, their employees, and native peoples—as through equitable trade. Though each helped to shape the modern world, their reputations are largely tarnished by their moral failings.

== Reception ==
Mainstream reviews of the book were mixed. The New York Times criticized the book, finding "problems with Mr. Bown’s approach. His focus on individuals means that the book deals with the companies themselves in only the most glancing way, and what analysis he offers is less than eye-opening...The ideal reader of Merchant Kings would appear to be an eighth-grade boy. Both the prose and the analysis are simplistic, occasionally purple — soldiers are not shot but 'blasted' — and largely devoid of business insight." However, the Times credited the book for its "easily digestible overview" of the period, and praised Bown's coining of the phrase "the Age of Heroic Commerce".

The Wall Street Journal was also critical of the author's decision to structure the book around the biographies of the companies' leaders, declaring, "Mr. Bown writes smoothly, but he appears to have done no original research and his potted biographies are linked by the barest of thematic threads." The Journal concluded that "Merchant Kings is not a robust popular history but a flimsy one, a collection of anecdotes strung together by generalizations."

However, The Globe and Mail praised the book as an "ingenious" distillation of multinational history, and noted that "though Bown focuses on individuals, he does not leave states and companies to plead innocence." Publishers Weekly called the book "a magnificent description of the six great companies, and their leaders".
