= Armytage baronets =

Set index for Armytage baronets

There have been two baronetcies created for members of the Armytage family, one in the Baronetage of England and one in the Baronetage of Great Britain. As of 2026, the latter creation is extant.

- Armytage baronets of Kirklees (1st creation, 1641)
- Armytage baronets of Kirklees (2nd creation, 1738)
