= Kaye baronets of Huddersfield (1923) =

Escutcheon of the Kaye baronets of Huddersfield

The Kaye baronetcy, of Huddersfield in the County of York, was created in the Baronetage of the United Kingdom on 8 March 1923 for the textile manufacturer Joseph Kaye. He was a Senior Director of Kaye and Stewart Ltd, of Huddersfield, and a Director of the London, Midland and Scottish Railway and of Lloyds Bank.

== Kaye baronets, of Huddersfield (1923) ==
- Sir Joseph Henry Kaye, 1st Baronet (1856–1923)
- Sir Henry Gordon Kaye, 2nd Baronet (1889–1956)
- Sir Stephen Henry Gordon Kaye, 3rd Baronet (1917–1983)
- Sir David Alexander Gordon Kaye, 4th Baronet (1919–1994)
- Sir Paul Henry Gordon Kaye, 5th Baronet (born 1958)

The heir apparent to the baronetcy is the son of the 5th Baronet, Lionel Gordon Arambala Kaye (born 2012).
