= Payne baronets =

- Escutcheon of the Payne baronets of St Christopher's
- Creation date: 1737
- Status: extinct
- Extinction date: 1801
- Motto: Malo mori quam foedari (I would rather die than be dishonoured)
- Arms: Gules, a fess, between two lions passant Argent.
- Crest: A lion's jamb erased, erect Argent, grasping a broken tilting spear Gules.

The Payne baronetcy, of St Christopher's in the West Indies, was a title in the Baronetage of Great Britain created on 31 October 1737 for Sir Charles Payne, knighted 1728. He was a planter there, and Major-General of the Leeward Islands. According to Cokayne's Complete Baronetage and the History of Parliament, it became extinct in 1801, with the death of the 2nd Baronet who left no legitimate male heir. The title was, however, assumed by two of the 2nd Baronet's illegitimate sons.

== Payne baronets, of St Christopher's (1737) ==
- Sir Charles Payne, 1st Baronet (died 1738)
- Sir Gillies Payne, 2nd Baronet (1720–1801)

For details of later claimants, see Peter Payne (MP).

== Extended family ==
Abraham Payne, brother of the 1st Baronet, was the grandfather of Sir William Payne-Gallwey, 1st Baronet (see Frankland-Payne-Gallwey baronets) and of Ralph Payne, 1st Baron Lavington.

Baronetage of Great Britain
Preceded by Peachey baronets	Payne baronets of St. Christopher's; 31 October 1737	Succeeded by Armytage baronets
