= Thomas Thornton (sportsman, died 1823) =

English sportsman (1751/2–1823)

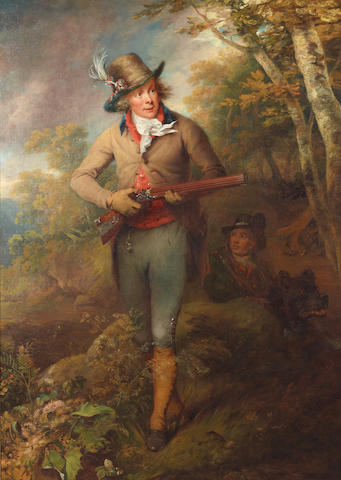
Thomas Thornton, c.1786. Portrait by Sawrey Gilpin and Philip Reinagle

Thomas Thornton (1751/2–1823) was an English sportsman, known for his assiduity in hunting and other outdoor pursuits, and in betting.

== Early life ==
He was the son of William Thornton of Yorkshire, Member of Parliament for York, 1747–1754 and 1758–1761; his mother Mary was the daughter of John Myster of Epsom. Born in London, he was sent to Charterhouse School, and matriculated at Glasgow University in 1766. He entered Trinity College, Cambridge in 1771.

Succeeding to his father's estate, Thornton became a keen sportsman, and revived falconry. He was appointed colonel of his father's old regiment, the 2nd West Yorks Militia. In 1786 he undertook a sporting tour in the Scottish Highlands. He chartered the sloop Falcon, and partly by sea and partly by land travelled through the northern and western highlands, dividing his time between hunting, shooting, angling, and hawking.

In 1789 Thornton bought Allerton Park from Frederick, Duke of York. He renamed it Thornville Royal.

In 1794, a dispute arose between Thornton and some of the officers of the militia unit under his command, while stationed at Roborough Camp in Devon. This led to Thornton's court-martial and his resignation from the army, although he would later characterise the event as a "Mutinous Conspiracy" in a pamphlet he wrote on the events.

== French visits ==
Thornton visited France before the French Revolution, and, with his supposed wife Alicia Thornton, revisited it in 1802, during the Peace of Amiens. He was introduced to Napoleon, to whom he presented a pair of Durs Egg pistols. One of these pistols, a gold-inlayed, three-barreled Pocket pistol survives and was sold by Bonhams in 2006 for £38,000.

He joined some French hunting parties and intended the purchase of a French estate; but difficulties of naturalisation and the renewal of the Napoleonic Wars frustrated the project.

== Later life ==
In 1805 Thornton disposed of Thornville Royal to Charles Stourton, 17th Baron Stourton, and apparently resided in London for a time. He later lived at Falconer's Hall, Bedfordshire, Boythorpe, Yorkshire, and Skypark, Wiltshire.

In September 1814, Thornton travelled to France with a party of sportsmen and a pack of hounds; at Rouen the party attracted a crowd of spectators. He returned to London in March 1815 during the period of the Hundred Days, but after the battle of Waterloo he returned to France, hiring the Château de Chambord, and purchasing an estate at Pont-sur-Seine: he styled himself Prince de Chambord and Marquis de Pont. In 1817 he obtained legal domicile in France, and he applied for naturalisation; but the application did not go through.

In 1820, Thornton's large collection of sporting pictures was sold in London. In 1821 Thornton sold Pont-sur-Seine to Casimir Pierre Périer. He latterly took lodgings in Paris, where he died on 10 March 1823.

== Works ==
In 1800, Thornton published his own, 320-page, account of the 1794 events at Roborough Camp.

In 1804 Thornton published A Sporting Tour through the Northern Parts of England and Great Part of the Highlands of Scotland. It was noticed in the Edinburgh Review of January 1805 by Walter Scott. The work was republished in 1896 in the "Sporting Library" of Sir Herbert Maxwell, 7th Baronet.

Letters to the Earl of Darlington, giving an account of Thornton's second French trip, were written up by a clergyman named Martyn, and appeared in 1806 under the title of A Sporting Tour in France. Martyn may have acted as ghostwriter also for the 1804 book. A French translation of this work appeared in 1894 in the Revue Britannique. In 1806, also, a pamphlet appeared, vindicating Thornton's conduct in a quarrel with a Mr. Burton.

== Gun collection ==
Thornton amassed a large collection of hunting guns, many unusual. He was a strong advocate for hunting with volley guns—firearms with multiple barrels that fired simultaneously. He owned a number of such weapons and the above portrait by Philip Reinagle and Sawrey Gilpin shows him armed with one of them,

One of Thornton's volley guns—an extremely unusual, 14-barrel rifle—survives and is part of the armouries collection of Le Grand Curtius museum in Liege, Belgium. This was made in London around 1800 by William Dupe. The weapon is inscribed in gold damascene with words "Perdition to Conspirators" and "With this alone I'll defend Robro Camp 1795", a reference to the events around five years earlier that led to the loss of Thornton's military command.

In 2001, Christie's sold a pair of Thornton's sporting guns, and a pair of cased pistols made for Thornton by Joseph Manton around 1774. Another pair of Thornton's pistols, duelling pistols made by Manton around 1776, was auctioned by Bonhams in 2011.

== Family ==
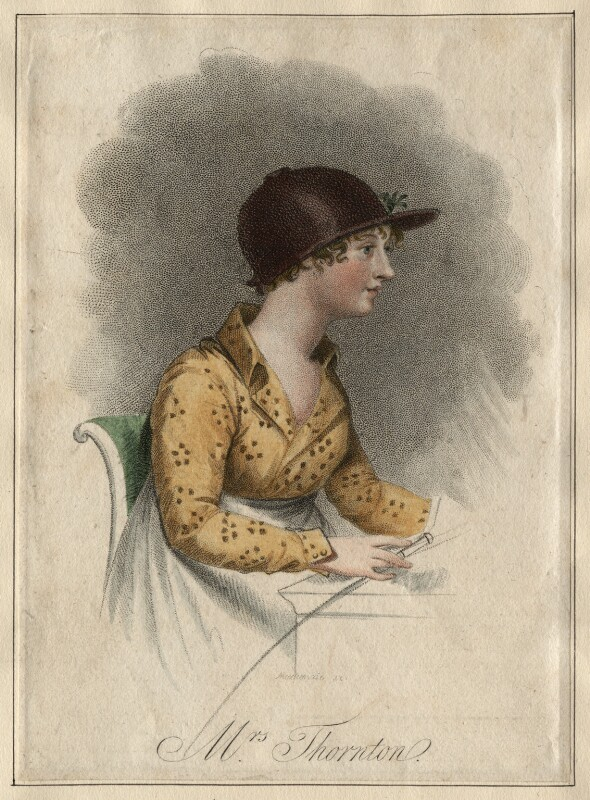
Alicia Thornton, 1805 engraving

Thornton was perhaps twice married: possibly firstly to Alicia Thornton, so-called, thought by Charles Fothergill to be his mistress.

Alicia became famous in her own right as the jockey who rode in two challenges of 1804–5, while Thornton was made notorious for the large bets on these races. The first event was in August 1804 and was associated with the York race meeting. Alicia raced her brother-in-law, Captain Flint, over four miles at Knavesmire, riding Thornton's horse Vinigrillo. However she lost.

At the following year's York meeting, Alicia rode against Frank Buckle, and won; but Thornton was horsewhipped by Flint, after refusing to honour the bet of 1000 guineas he had made on the 1804 race. Alicia eloped with a soldier in 1806.

Thornton married at Lambeth, in 1806, Eliza Cawston of Mundon, Essex, by whom he had a son, William Thomas, born in London in 1807. By a will executed in London in 1818 he bequeathed almost all his property to Thornvillia Diana Thornton, his illegitimate daughter, then aged 17, by Priscilla Duins. The will was disputed by his widow on behalf of her son, and both the prerogative court and French tribunals pronounced against its validity.

== Legacy ==
Michael Brander, an author who wrote on hunting and country pursuits, followed the route of Thornton's Scottish hunting tour in 1958. An account of this journey was published in 1961 and republished in 1973.
