= Armytage baronets of Kirklees (1st creation, 1641) =

Armytage baronets
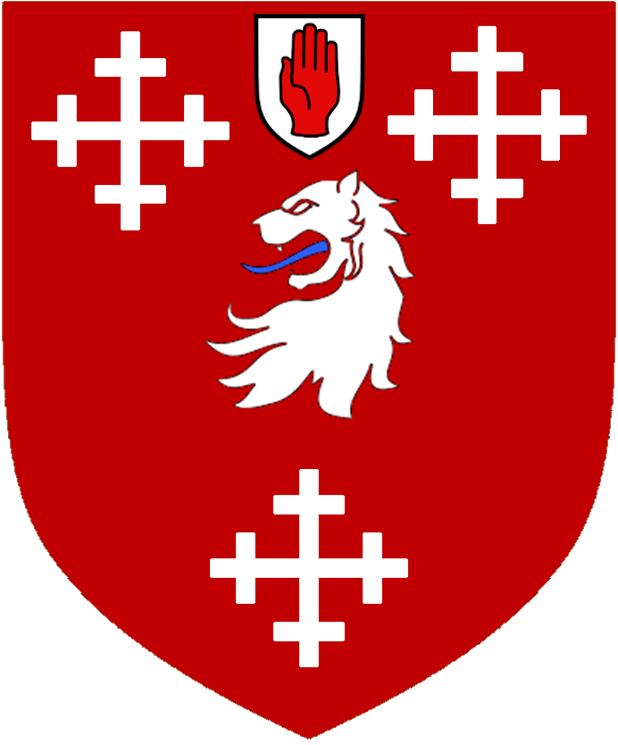
- Escutcheon of the Armytage baronets of Kirklees
- Creation: 1641
- Status: extinct
- Extinction date: 1737
- Motto: Semper paratus (Always ready)
- Arms: Gules a Lion's Head erased between three Cross Crosslets Argent
- Crest: A Dexter Arm embowed couped at the shoulder habited Or cuffed Argent holding in the Hand proper a Staff Gules headed and pointed Or

The Armytage baronetcy, of Kirklees in the County of York, was created in the Baronetage of England on 15 December 1641 for Francis Armytage. His father John Armytage was High Sheriff of Yorkshire in 1615.

The 1st Baronet was succeeded by his eldest son, the 2nd Baronet, High Sheriff of Yorkshire from 1668 to 1669. His three sons Thomas, John and George, all succeeded in turn to the title. After they all died unmarried, the 5th Baronet was succeeded by his first cousin Thomas, the 6th Baronet, the son of Francis Armytage, younger son of the 1st Baronet. He also did not marry, and on his death in 1737 the baronetcy became extinct.

== Armytage baronets, of Kirklees (1641) ==
- Sir Francis Armytage, 1st Baronet (c. 1600–1644)
- Sir John Armytage, 2nd Baronet (1629–1677)
- Sir Thomas Armytage, 3rd Baronet (1652–1694)
- Sir John Armytage, 4th Baronet (1653–1732)
- Sir George Armytage, 5th Baronet (1660–1736)
- Sir Thomas Armytage, 6th Baronet (1673–1737)
