= William Thornton (died 1769) =

English politician (1712/3–1769)

William Thornton (1712/13–1769) of Cattal was an English politician, Member of Parliament for York, described also as a "celebrated though eccentric sportsman". He raised a militia troop to oppose the 1745 Jacobite Rebellion, and gained royal favour.

== Life ==
He was the son of Sir William Thornton of Yorkshire and his wife Elizabeth, born at Netherton. He attended Mr Jackson's school in York, was admitted to St John's College, Cambridge in 1731, at age 18.

At the time of the 1745 Jacobite Rebellion, Thornton raised at his own expense the "Yorkshire Blues" to fight the troops of the Young Pretender, and took part in the battle of Falkirk. He became Colonel of the 2nd West Yorks Militia. He served as MP for York from 1747 to 1754, and from 1758 to 1761. He travelled to Hanover with George II, and turned down the offer of a baronetcy. In parliament, he initially supported the government, but became part of the opposition in 1751. He was an opponent in 1753 to the idea of a national census.

Thornton died on 10 July 1769. The family owned Lendal Tower in York, used as a municipal water supply, from about 1719 to 1779. In 1756 a mortgage was taken out on it, by Thornton, to install a Newcomen engine for pumping.

== Family ==
Thornton married:

1. Isabella Norton (died 1748), daughter of William Norton of Sawley, North Yorkshire; and
2. In 1749, Mary Myster, daughter of John Myster of Epsom, with whom he had a son Thomas Thornton, and a daughter Mary (1751–1842), who married Samuel Francis Barlow (c.1747–1800) of Middlethorpe Hall.
