= Derventio Brigantum =

Ancient Roman fort in present-day North Yorkshire, England

Derventio
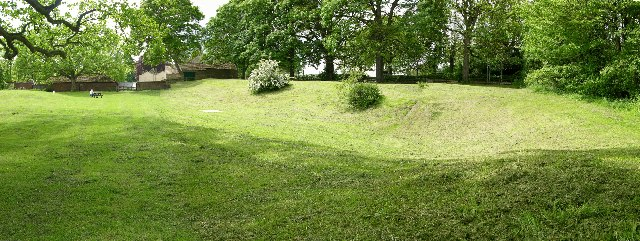
- Visible remains at Orchard Field, Malton showing the surviving earthworks of the north east corner of the fort

- Map showing the location of Derventio within North Yorkshire.
- 54.136190°N 0.79031020°W
- Type: Roman fort
- Location: Malton, North Yorkshire
- Region: Yorkshire

History
- Built: AD 70
- Abandoned: 5th century

Site notes
- Archaeologists: Philip Corder, John Kirk, Leslie Peter Wenham
- Public access: Partly in public parkland

Derventio, sometimes described as Derventio Brigantium (Latin for "Derventio of the Brigantes") in order to distinguish it from other places called Derventio, was a Roman fort and settlement located beneath the modern town of Malton in North Yorkshire, England. The fort is 18 miles north-east of Eboracum on the River Derwent. (Note: The Antonine Itinerary gives the distance as 7 Roman miles.)

== Site name ==
The Roman name for the Malton military complex first appears in the Antonine Itinerary of the late-second century. It is also mentioned in the fourth- or fifth-century Notitia Dignitatum as Deruentione – the last auxiliary garrison "at the disposal of the Right Honourable Duke of the Britains".

== Archaeological investigations ==
Initial investigations at the site were undertaken by Philip Corder and John Kirk in the 1930s. The excavated material from this site formed the core collection of the Malton Museum. These excavations took in both the defences and interior buildings of the north-east corner of the fort and trial trenches in the south-west of the fort. A further series of excavations between 1949 and 1952 by the Ministry of Works in the civilian settlement uncovered multiple phases of activity as well as a road, several buildings and a mosaic.

Timber and stone structures were identified during excavations on the fort in 1970 by Leslie Peter Wenham. A complex building sequence was revealed, with major phases occurring during the Trajanic, Severan, Constantian and Theodosian periods. The south and west defences of an early Roman military work were confirmed beneath the vicus buildings, very likely a southern annexe of the known fort. These additional defences comprised a turf rampart 16 ft (4.9m) wide, backing a ditch 6 ft (1.8m) wide and 3½ft (1.2m) deep.

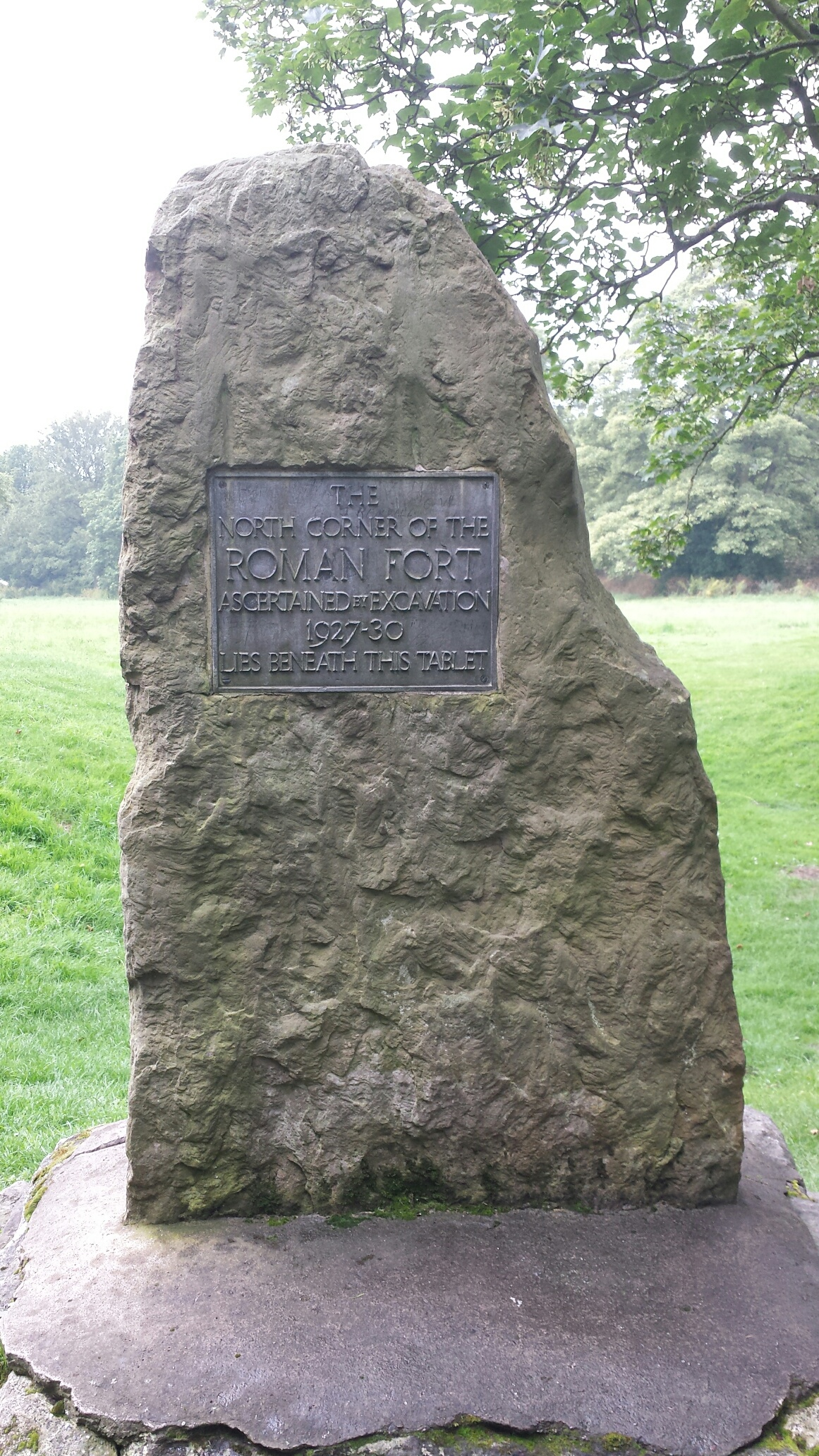
Plaque recording the excavations by Philip Corder

== The fort ==
The earliest secure construction of a fort at Malton was in the AD 70s under Agricola, contemporary with the nearby fortress at Eboracum. Built on the north side of the River Derwent, this original phase was in timber, with the wall being rebuilt in stone in the early second century. The presence of the Ala shows that for at least part of its history, Derventio was capable of housing a mounted cavalry unit.

Only a single unit has been clearly associated with occupation at this site, the Ala Gallorum Picentiana (The Picentine wing of Gauls). The single record of this unit is an altar dedicated by the Prefect Candidus, from the ruins of the Severan bathhouse. It remains unclear when the Ala Gallorum Picentiana were first established at Malton and when they left. However, a Hamian archers unit, known as "Numerus Syrorum Saggitariorum", served at Derventio Brigantum.

== Civilian settlement ==
As with many Roman forts, a civilian settlement grew up around the established military base. The evidence at Malton shows extramural settlement surrounding the south gate of the fort and crossing to the south side of the river, following the roads leading away from the fort. Many buildings were discovered, the most elaborate of which was found some 150 ft south of the fort, measured 90 ft by 30 ft and included heated floors. One mid-second century structure contained circular baking ovens. To the west of the road a series of rectangular buildings of an average size of 25 by 40 ft stood closely compacted together and have been interpreted as workshops or store-houses; most of the pottery from this area, including much local ware, and coin evidence dates this area to the second half of the third and the first half of the fourth century. It has been suggested that a spring in the north-east of the civilian settlement may have been the source for the bath-house, although the structure has not been located. A canal, dug in 1810, destroyed any of the structures which may have been close to the line of the river.

== Trade and economy ==
The fort lies on the north banks of the River Derwent, the civilian settlement on the south site. The Roman road network provides access to the east coast and to larger settlements like Eboracum.

Evidence exists for the working of bronze, iron and pewter. The locally sourced jet was worked at the site into jewellery. A single inscription, from beneath the New Malton Church, offered a dedication to the genius of the place and to wish good luck to a young slave inheriting a goldsmith's shop, an otherwise unique inscription in Roman Britain.

== Religion ==
No temples are currently known from Derventio. A single inscription is dedicated to Mars Rigus.

== Post-Roman ==
Malton Castle, a motte-and-bailey castle was built by the de Vesci family over the west corner of the Roman fort in the eleventh century. This was demolished in the seventeenth century when a mansion was built on the site by Lord Eure, which was destroyed in 1674. The Dark Age settlement is the setting for much of the action in An East Wind Blowing by Australian author Mel Keegan.

== Visible remains ==
The original earthworks are still visible in the centre of the modern town in an area known as 'Orchard Fields'. Collections from excavations at Derventio form part of the Malton Museum. Roman material from Malton can also be found in the Yorkshire Museum.

== See also ==
- Eboracum
- Derventio Coritanorum (Little Chester, Derby)
- Stamford Bridge, East Riding of Yorkshire § Location and history
- Roman Britain
