= Quintus Antonius Isauricus =

2nd century military commander and suffect consul

- Military career
- Allegiance: Roman Empire
- Service years: c.140-160
- Rank: Legate, Suffect Consul
- Commands: Legio VI Victrix

Quintus Antonius Isauricus was a Roman legatus legionis commanding Legio VI Victrix in Britain during the late AD 140s. He is attested as later serving as suffect consul in May 156 or 157 under Antoninus Pius with Lucius Aurelius Flaccus as his colleague.

== Life ==
Anthony Birley makes several comments about Isauricus' name and likely family. Birley notes Quinti Antonii are rare in all parts of the Roman Empire, and only one other senator is known. The cognomen "Isauricus" is reminiscent of two consuls of the late Roman Republic, Publius Servilius Vatia Isauricus, consul 79 BC, and his son Publius Servilius Vatia Isauricus, twice consul in 48 BC and 41 BC; their descendants can be traced into the second century AD. Birley speculates that Antonius Isauricus may be descended from these Republican consuls through the female side.

Quintus Antonius Isauricus is named in an inscription from Eboracum (York). The inscription was dedicated to his wife, Sosia Juncina, whom Birley speculates may have been related to another consul, Quintus Sosius Senecio, consul in 99 and 107. A fragment of the Fasti Feriarum Latinarum and a military diploma provide evidence of his consulate.

== Inscription at York ==
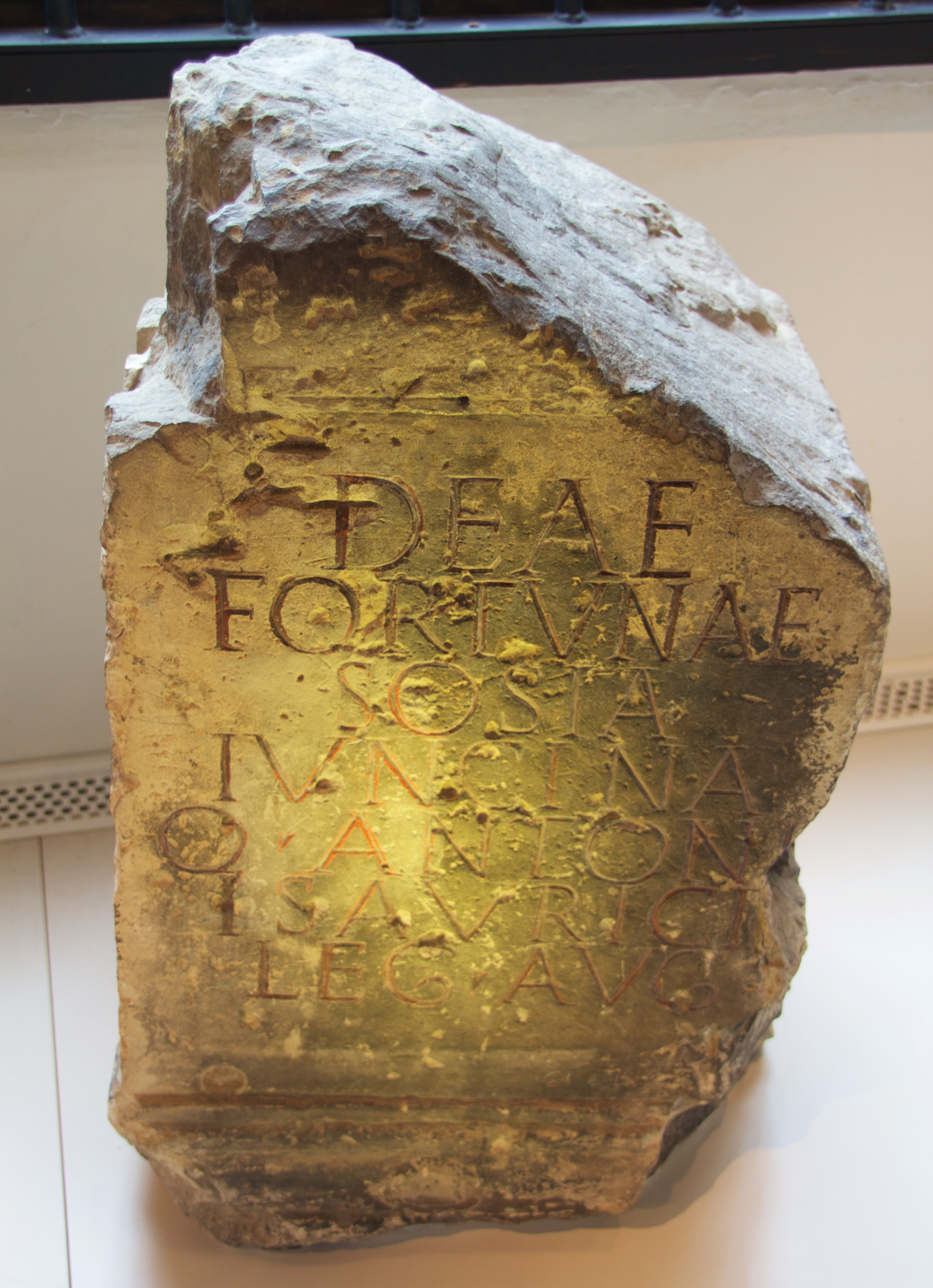
The altar on display in the Yorkshire Museum

The Inscription which names Isauricus is an altar dedicated to Fortuna by his wife, Sosia Iuncina. It was found in 1839 at the site of the Old Railway Station, York and is associated with the Roman Baths nearby. Dedications to the Goddess of fortune are often associated with bath-houses. The stone, measuring 71 x 40 x 38 cm and made of limestone, is inscribed with seven lines of texts.

The stone inscription reads: DEAE / FORTUNAE / SOSIA / IUNCINA / Q(uinti) ANTONI / ISAURICI / LEG(ati) AUG(usti)

To the Goddess Fortuna, Sosia Juncina, wife of Quintus Antonius Isauricus, Imperial Legate, built this.
