= Brenda Swinbank =

British archaeologist (1929–2022)

Brenda Swinbank FSA
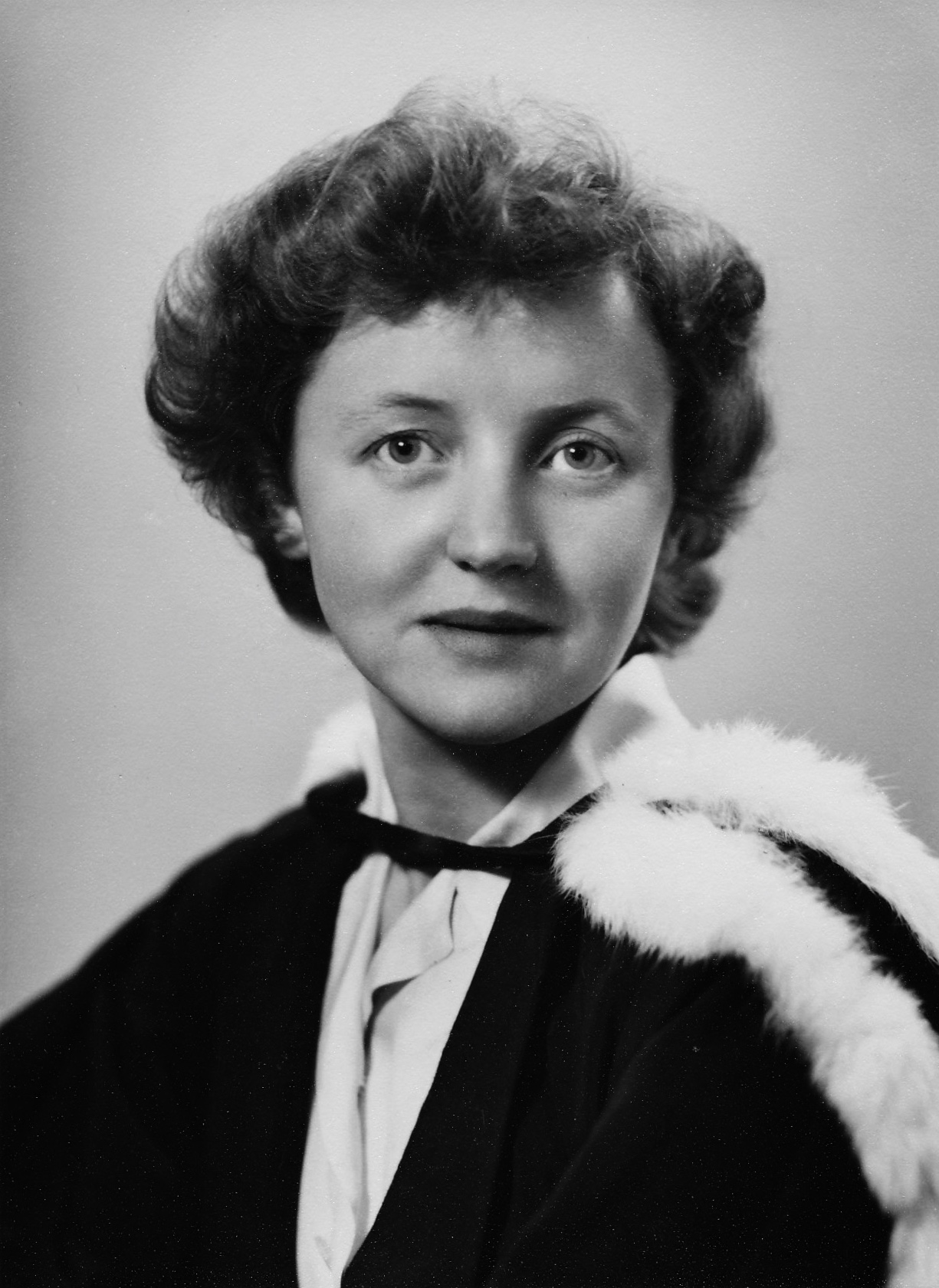
- Brenda Swinbank, archaeologist
- Born: 2 February 1929; Ackworth, West Riding of Yorkshire, England
- Died: 20 December 2022 (aged 93); Wallington, London, England
- Occupation: Archaeologist
- Known for: One of the first women in Britain to become a professional archaeologist

Brenda Swinbank (later Heywood; 2 February 1929 – 20 December 2022) was an English archaeologist. She was one of the first women in Britain to become a professional archaeologist, specialising in the study of Hadrian's Wall, and was instrumental in bringing to publication excavations under York Minster.

== Education and career ==
Swinbank went to Hemsworth Grammar School in Wakefield before attending Durham University in 1946 to study Modern History, where she was inspired by Eric Birley, who invited Swinbank to stay at his house at Chesterholm, near Vindolanda, and who later described her as a "really competent excavator and field archaeologist", to excavate at Corbridge and Housesteads. During her studies at Durham she was president of the Durham College's History Society and was a member of St Aidan's Society.

She graduated in 1949 with an upper second-class degree in History, and attended the Hadrian's Wall Pilgrimage before being awarded a two-year Durham Colleges Research Studentship. In 1950, Swinbank supervised excavations at Birdoswald with John Gillam, before completing her thesis The Vallum Reconsidered, for which she received a doctorate from Durham University in 1954. She became the third British woman awarded a PhD for a thesis on the archaeology of Britain. Swinbank also excavated sections of the Vallum including at Cawfields and Great Chesters as part of her research, as well as Bewcastle, the Carrawburgh Mithraeum with Ian Richmond, and elsewhere the Roman fort of Castell Collen at Llandrindod Wells with Leslie Alcock, and the Roman fort at Penydarren in South Wales.

In 1956, Swinbank began a two-year assistant lectureship at the University College of South Wales and Monmouthshire, covering the history of Europe from the Classical Period to the Dark Ages. In 1958, she featured alongside Eric Birley, John Gillam and Kate Hodgson in a BBC Home Service broadcast marking 1,800 years' study of Hadrian's Wall. Swinbank was also elected a fellow of the Society of Antiquaries of London in 1958. However, despite her achievements she was not granted a permanent university position, and in the autumn of that year took up an appointment as Assistant History Mistress at Ackworth School, one of a few Quaker educational establishments in England.

It was not until the late 1960s that Swinbank was able to again involve herself more fully in archaeology. She connected with Peter Wenham, an archaeologist and contact of Eric Birley. In 1968 she began to lecture the Roman Britain course at St John's College in York and assist with excavations, including preparing the final report of the excavations of the vicus at Malton in 1971.

In 1974, she joined in the post-excavation processing of the great mass of archaeological materials unearthed during the stabilisation of York Minster, becoming a full-time research fellow in 1976. In the words of her biographer, these consisted of "rooms full of documents, soil samples, pieces of pottery and bone, 3,000 photographs, chunks of carved stonework and even one large block of dirt weighing several tonnes." She brought these to publication as the first volume of the York Minster materials and also, in 1992, became a director of the Yorkshire Architectural & York Archaeological Society. After this Swinbank returned to her former interests on the vallum of Hadrian's Wall, which, with the assistance of David Breeze, she published in the late 2000s.

== Personal life and death ==
Brenda Swinbank was born on 2 February 1929, in Ackworth, West Yorkshire, the youngest of five siblings. She married Peter Heywood, a teacher and colleague at the Friends' School in Ackworth, with whom she had two sons and a daughter who died. Following Peter's death from prostate cancer in 2010, Swinbank moved to London to be closer to her sons, one of whom, Jeremy Heywood, was the Cabinet Secretary and Head of the Civil Service. By 2017, Swinbank was living with dementia; Swinbank's daughter-in-law, Suzanne Heywood, wrote a biography of her life based on Swinbank's own writings along with recollections from Swinbank's friends and colleagues.

Swinbank died from complications of Alzheimer's disease at a care home in Wallington, London, on 20 December 2022, at the age of 93. She was survived by her son, Simon, and her six grandchildren.

== Legacy ==
Swinbank's notes from her survey of the vallum have been used by researchers at Newcastle University as part of WallCAP to undertake further research at Heddon-on-the-Wall.

TrowelBlazers, an organisation dedicated to increasing the representation of women in archaeology, including through publishing biographies on their website, have included Swinbank as a notable figure for her contributions to the study of Hadrian's Wall and York Minster. It is noted, however, that Swinbank was hindered by her inability to focus more on archaeology, and her work has ultimately not received much recognition beyond those specialising in Hadrian's Wall.

== Publications ==
- Swinbank, B.; Gillam, J. P. (1950). "Pottery from the Vallum filing at Birdoswald". Cumberland and Westmorland Transactions. New Series (50): 54–62.
- Swinbank, B.; Spaul, J. E. H. (1951). "The spacing of the forts on Hadrian's Wall". Archaeologia Aeliana. 4th Series (29): 221–238.
- Swinbank, B. (1951). "A trial excavation at Moresby". Cumberland and Westmorland Transactions. New Series (51): 176–177.
- Swinbank, B. (1952). "Excavations in High House paddock". Cumberland and Westmorland Transactions. New Series (52): 46–54.
- Swinbank, B. (1953). "The problem of the Vallum at Carvoran". Archaeologia Aeliana. 4th Series (31): 82–94.
- Swinbank, B. (1953). "The activities of Lollius Urbicus as evidenced by inscriptions". Transactions of the Architectural and Archaeological Society of Durham and Northumberland (10): 382–403.
- Swinbank, B. (1954). The Vallum Reconsidered (PhD). Durham University.
- Swinbank, B. (1955). "Pottery from levels of the second and third century, covering the Vallum at Benwell". Archaeologia Aeliana. 4th Series (33): 142–162.
- Swinbank, B. (1955). "Archaeology in Schools". Journal of the Institute of Education of Durham University.
- Swinbank, B. (1956). "Book Review of Anne S. Robertson's 'An Antonine Fort, Golden Hill, Duntocher'". Transactions of the Dumfries and Galloway Natural History & Antiquarian Society (35): 143–153.
- Heywood, B. (1965). "The Vallum – its problems restated". In Jarrett, M.G.; Dobson, B. (eds.). Britain and Rome, Essays presented to Eric Birley. Titus Wilson. pp. 85–94.
- Heywood, B. (1969). "Summeries on Neath and Penydarren". In Jarrett, M.G. (ed.). The Roman Frontier in Wales [2nd edition]. Board of Celtic Studies of the University of Wales.
- Heywood, B. (1990). "Leslie Peter Wenham (1911-90)". Yorkshire Archaeological Journal (60): 201–202.
- Heywood, B. (1991). "The Roman fort at Penydarren, Glamorgan". Bulletin of the Board of Celtic Studies (38): 167–190.
- Heywood, B.; Phillips, D.; Carver, M. (1995). Excavations at York Minster, Volume 1, Parts 1 and 2: From Roman Fortress to Norman Cathedral. Royal Commission on the Historical Monuments of England.
- Wenham, L.P.; Heywood, B. (1997). Excavations in the Vicus at Malton, North Yorkshire. Yorkshire Archaeology Report 3.
- Heywood, B. (1998). "Book Review of 'Excavations and observations on the defences and adjacent sites 1971-90' by Patrick Ottaway". Yorkshire Archaeological Journal (70): 159–161.
- Heywood, B.; Breeze, D.J. (2008). "Excavations on Vallum causeways on Hadrian's Wall in the 1950s". Archaeologia Aeliana. 5th Series (37): 93–126.
- Heywood, B. (2009). "Appendix 2: The Vallum at Limestone Corner". In Wilmott, T. (ed.). Hadrian's Wall, Archaeological Research by English Heritage 1976-2000. English Heritage. p. 419.
- Heywood, B.; Breeze, D.J. (2010). "The Vallum causeway and fort ditches at Great Chesters". Archaeologia Aeliana. 5th Series (39): 1–7.
