= Abi Curtis =

Poet, writer, and lecturer

Abi Curtis is a poet, writer, and lecturer at York St John University.

== Biography ==
Abi Curtis received a PhD in Creative and Critical Writing from the University of Sussex, and went on to teach there until 2010. She is currently Professor of Creative Writing at York St John University.

She received an Eric Gregory Award from the Society of Authors in 2004 and her pamphlet, Humbug, was published as part of the Tall Lighthouse Pilot series. Her first collection, Unexpected Weather, was published after winning the Crashaw Poetry Prize in 2008.

In 2012, her poetry collection The Glass Delusion was published by Salt Publishing. This collection received a Somerset Maugham Award from The Society of Authors in 2013.

Curtis’ debut dystopian novel Water & Glass was released in 2017, published by Cloud Lodge Books.

Her work has also been published in various journals and anthologies, including Best British Poetry 2012, The London Review of Books, Magma, Long Poem Magazine, Poetry South, Ambit, and Lung Jazz: Young British Poets for Oxfam.

== Published works ==
=== Fiction ===
- Water & Glass, Cloud Lodge Books (2017)

=== Poetry ===
- The Glass Delusion, Salt Publishing (2012)
- Unexpected Weather, Salt Publishing (2009)
- Humbug, Tall Lighthouse (2004)

=== Critical Papers ===
- Mushrooming: Resistance and Creativity in Sigmund Freud and Emily Dickinson in Angelaki: The Journal of the Theoretical Humanities Routledge, Vol. 18.2, December 2013
- Squiddity: The Power of the Squid in Writing in First Fictions, University of Sussex, January 2012
- Re-thinking the Unconscious in Creative Writing Pedagogy, in New Writing: The International Journal for the Practice and Theory of Creative Writing, Autumn 2009
- Inventions of Telepathy review article in The Oxford Literary Review: ‘Telepathies’, December 2008
- An Impossible Apprenticeship, on teaching poetry, Poetry News, Summer 2006
