= Karen Bryan =

British speech therapist and academic

Professor Karen Bryan FRCSLT, OBE
- Occupation: Speech therapist

Academic background
- Education: University of Newcastle

Karen Bryan OBE FRCSLT, is a Speech and Language Therapist, and Vice Chancellor of York St John University since April 2020. Prior to this, Professor Bryan was Deputy Vice Chancellor (Academic) at the University of Greenwich.

== Career ==
Professor Bryan qualified as a speech and language therapist from the [University of Newcastle upon Tyne] and also gained her PhD there. Her research interests are in communication difficulties in young offenders, workforce development and the effectiveness of interventions for communication disorders associated with stroke, dementia and other neurological conditions.

Bryan was Head of the School of Health and Social Care at the University of Surrey before moving, in 2013, to the position of Pro Vice-Chancellor for its Faculty of Health and Wellbeing at Sheffield Hallam University. She was the Deputy Vice-Chancellor (Academic) at the University of Greenwich and Chair of the University Schools Trust.

In April 2020, Bryan became the new Vice Chancellor of York St John University.She is also a visiting professor in the Department of Neuropsychology at the University of Warsaw.

Bryan was elected a Fellow of the Royal College of Speech and Language Therapists in 2011, and awarded an OBE in the 2018 New Year Honours for services to Higher Education.
