= Eboracum =

Ancient Roman city in present-day York, England

- Eburacum
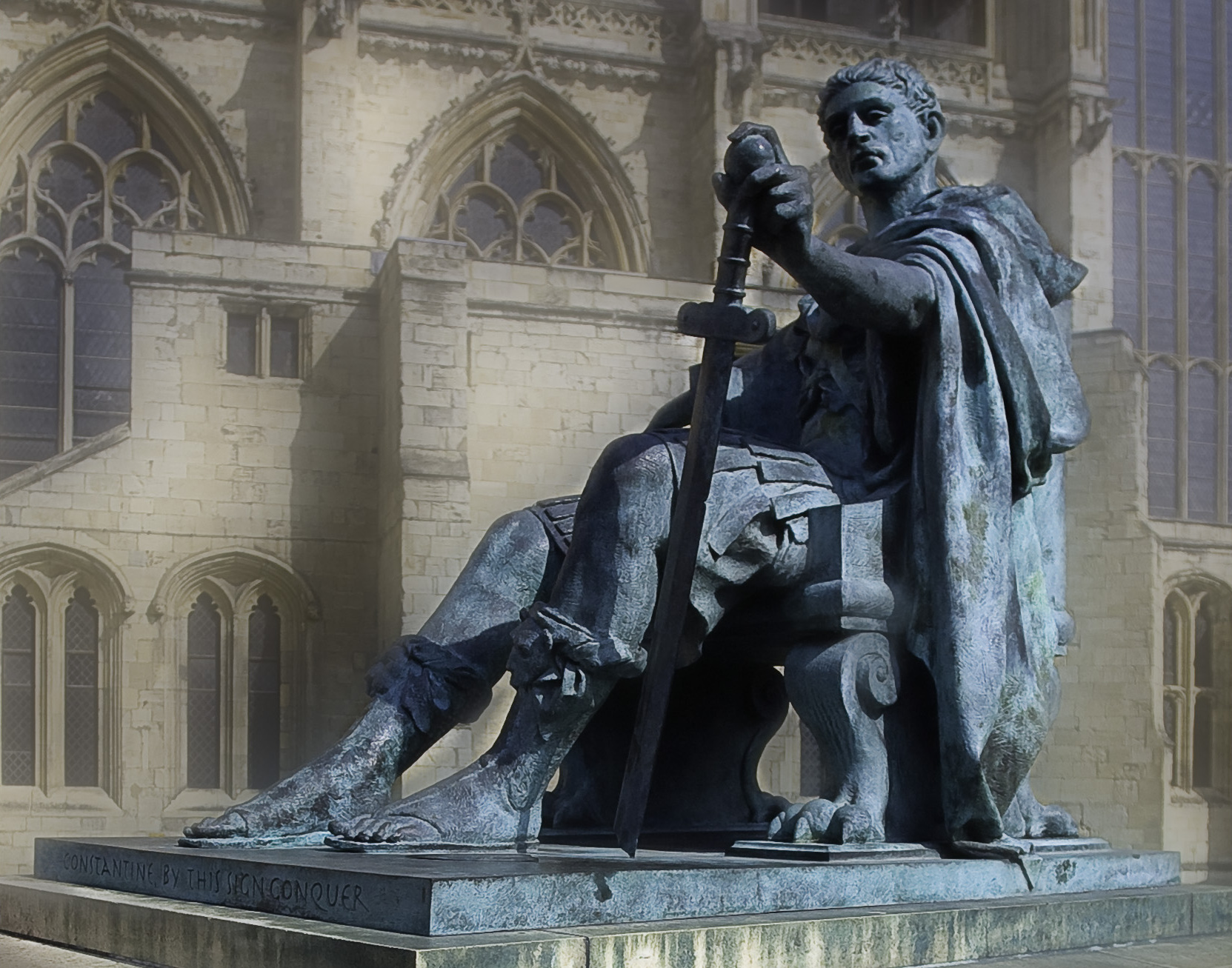
- Modern statue of Constantine the Great outside York Minster

- Location within England
- 53°57′42″N 01°04′50″W
- Type: Fortification and settlement
- Periods: Roman Imperial
- Location: York, North Yorkshire, England
- Region: Britannia

History
- Built: 71
- Built by: Quintus Petillius Cerialis

Site notes
- Archaeologists: Leslie Peter Wenham

Eboracum (Classical Latin: [ɛbɔˈraːkũː]) was a fort and later a city in the Roman province of Britannia. In its prime it was the largest town in northern Britannia and a provincial capital. The site remained occupied after the decline of the Western Roman Empire and ultimately developed into the present-day city of York, in North Yorkshire, England.

Two Roman emperors died in Eboracum: Septimius Severus in 211 AD, and Constantius Chlorus in 306 AD.

The first known recorded mention of Eboracum by name is dated c. 95–104 AD, and is an address containing the settlement's name, Eburaci, on a wooden stylus tablet from the Roman fortress of Vindolanda in what is now Northumberland. During the Roman period, the name was written both Eboracum and Eburacum (in nominative form).

The name Eboracum comes from the Common Brittonic *Eburākon, of disputed meaning. One view is that it meant "yew tree place", if Proto-Celtic *ebura meant "yew" (cf. Old Irish ibar "yew-tree", Irish: iúr (older iobhar), Scottish Gaelic: iubhar, Welsh: efwr "alder buckthorn", Breton: evor "alder buckthorn"), combined with the proprietive suffix *-āko(n) "having" (cf. Welsh -og, Gaelic -ach) (cf. efrog in Welsh, eabhrach/iubhrach in Irish Gaelic and eabhrach/iobhrach in Scottish Gaelic, by which names the city is known in those languages). Other linguists, such as Andrew Breeze and Peter Schrijver, dispute the etymological connection of *eburos and "yew"; Schrijver suggests that *eburos meant "rowan", and that *iwo, giving Welsh yw and Old Irish éo, was the only Proto-Celtic word for "yew". Schrijver has suggested that the derivation from Latin ebur (ivory) instead refers to boar's tusks. The name was Latinized by replacing the Celtic neuter nominative ending -on by its Latin equivalent -um, a common use noted also in Gaul and Lusitania (Ebora Liberalitas Julia). Various place names, such as Évry, Ivry, Ivrey, Ivory and Ivrac in France would all come from *eburacon / *eburiacon; for example: Ivry-la-Bataille (Eure, Ebriaco in 1023–1033), Ivry-le-Temple (Evriacum in 1199), and Évry (Essonne, Everiaco in 1158).

== Origins ==
The Roman conquest of Britain began in 43 AD, but advance beyond the Humber did not take place until the early 70s AD. This was because the people in the area, known as the Brigantes by the Romans, became a Roman client state. When Brigantian leadership changed, becoming more hostile to Rome, Roman general Quintus Petillius Cerialis led the Ninth Legion north from Lincoln across the Humber. Eboracum was founded in 71 AD when Cerialis and the Ninth Legion constructed a military fortress (castrum) on flat ground above the River Ouse near its junction with the River Foss. In the same year, Cerialis was appointed Governor of Britain.

A legion at full strength at that time numbered some 5,500 men, and provided new trading opportunities for enterprising local people, who doubtless flocked to Eboracum to take advantage of them. As a result, permanent civilian settlement grew up around the fortress especially on its south-east side. Civilians also settled on the opposite side of the Ouse, initially along the main road from Eboracum to the south-west. By the later 2nd century, growth was rapid; streets were laid out, public buildings were erected and private houses spread out over terraces on the steep slopes above the river

== Military ==
Roman legionary fortress walls with street plan of Eboracum, the Colonia walls and lines of Roman roads, shown over the modern city of York.

From its foundation the Roman fort of Eboracum was aligned on a north-east/south-east bearing on the north bank of the River Ouse. It measured 1,600 × 1,360 pedes monetales (474 × 403 m) and covered an area of 50 acres (200,000 m^{2}). The standard layout of streets running through the castra is assumed, although some evidence exists for the via praetoria, via decumana and via sagularis. Much of the modern understanding of the fortress defences has come from extensive excavations undertaken by L. P. Wenham.

The layout of the fortress also followed the standard for a legionary fortress, with wooden buildings inside a square defensive boundary. These defences, originally consisting of turf ramparts on a green wood foundation, were built by the Ninth Legion between 71 and 74 AD. Later these were replaced by a clay mound with a turf front on a new oak foundation, and eventually, wooden battlements were added, which were then replaced by limestone walls and towers. The original wooden camp was refurbished by Agricola in 81, before being completely rebuilt in stone between 107 and 108. The fortress was garrisoned soon afterwards by the Sixth Legion, possibly as soon as 118.

Multiple phases of restructuring and rebuilding within the fortress are recorded. Rebuilding in stone began in the early second century AD under Trajan, but may have taken as long as the start of the reign of Septimius Severus to be completed; a period of over 100 years. Estimates suggest that over 48,000 m^{3} of stone were required, largely consisting of Magnesian Limestone from the quarries near the Roman settlement of Calcaria (Tadcaster).

== Visiting emperors ==
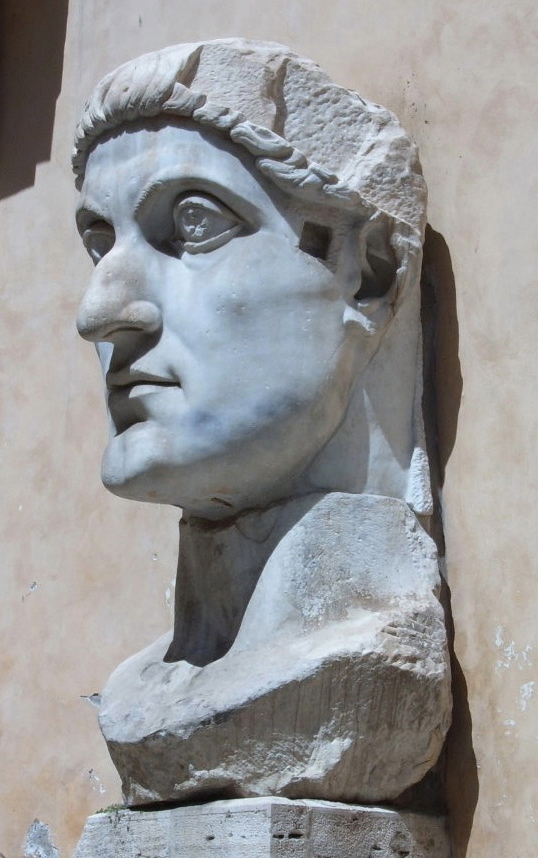
A bust of Constantine I from 313 to 324 AD; Musei Capitolini, Rome

There is evidence that the Emperor Hadrian visited in 122 on his way north to plan his great walled frontier. He either brought, or sent earlier, the Sixth Legion to replace the existing garrison. Emperor Septimius Severus visited Eboracum in 208 and made it his base for campaigning in Caledonia (the fortress wall was probably reconstructed during his stay and at the east angle it is possible to see this work standing almost to full height). The Imperial court was based in York until at least 211, when Severus died and was succeeded by his sons, Caracalla and Geta. A biographer, Cassius Dio, described a scene in which the Emperor utters the final words to his two sons on his death bed: "Agree with each other, make the soldiers rich, and ignore everyone else." Severus was cremated in Eboracum shortly after his death. Dio described the ceremony: "His body arrayed in military garb was placed upon a pyre, and as a mark of honour the soldiers and his sons ran about it and as for the soldier's gifts, those who had things at hand to offer them put them upon it and his sons applied the fire." (The location of the cremation was not recorded. A hill to the west of modern York, known as Severus Hill, is associated by some antiquarians as the site where this cremation took place, but no archaeological investigation has corroborated this claim.)

In the later 3rd century, the western Empire experienced political and economic turmoil and Britain was for some time ruled by usurpers independent of Rome. It was after crushing the last of these that Emperor Constantius I came to Eboracum and, in 306, became the second Emperor to die there. His son Constantine was instantly proclaimed as successor by the troops based in the fortress. Although it took Constantine eighteen years to become sole ruler of the Empire, he may have retained an interest in Eboracum and the reconstruction of the south-west front of the fortress with polygonally-fronted interval towers and the two great corner towers, one of which (the Multangular Tower) still survives, is probably his work. In the colonia, Constantine's reign was a time of prosperity and a number of extensive stone town houses of the period have been excavated.

== Government ==
For the Romans, Eboracum was the major military base in the north of Britain and, following the 3rd century division of the province of Britannia, the capital of northern Britain, Britannia Inferior. By 237 Eboracum had been made a colonia, the highest legal status a Roman city could attain; there were only four coloniae in Britain, and all but Eboracum had been founded for retired soldiers. This mark of Imperial favour was probably a recognition of Eboracum as the largest town in the north and the capital of Britannia Inferior. At around the same time Eboracum became self-governing, with a council made up of rich locals, including merchants and veteran soldiers. In 296 Britannia Inferior was divided into two provinces of equal status with Eboracum becoming the provincial capital of Britannia Secunda.

== Culture ==
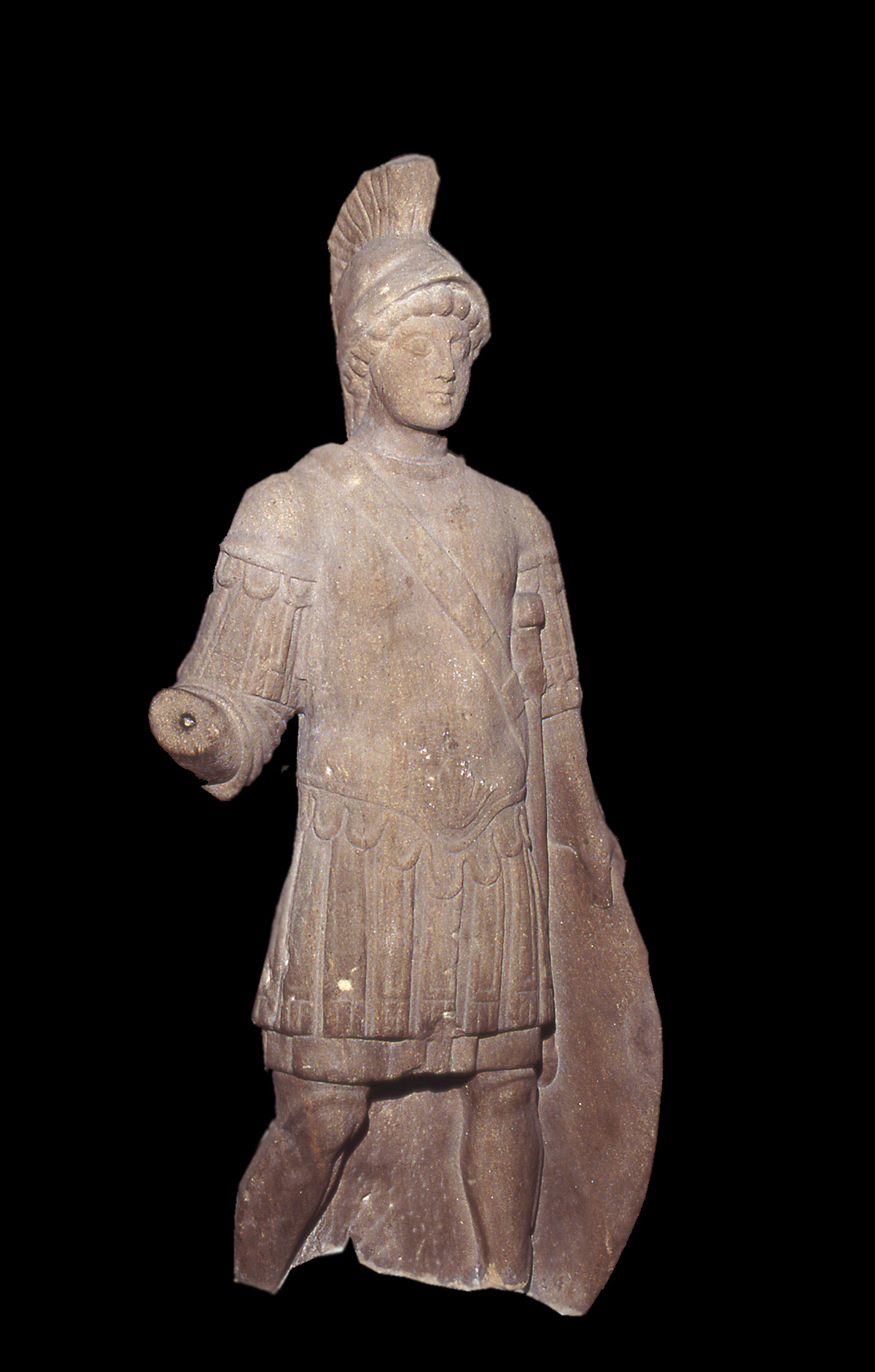
Statue of Mars from Blossom Street in York

As a busy port and a provincial capital Eboracum was a cosmopolitan city with residents from throughout the Roman Empire.

=== Diet ===
Substantial evidence for the use of cereal crops and animal husbandry can be found in Eboracum. A first-century warehouse fire from Coney Street, on the North bank of the Ouse and outside the fortress, showed that spelt wheat was the most common cereal grain used at that time, followed by barley. Cattle, sheep, goats and pigs were the major sources of meat. Hunting scenes, as shown through Romano-British "hunt cups", suggest hunting was a popular pastime and that diet would be supplemented through the hunting of hare, deer and boar. A variety of food preparation vessels (mortaria) have been excavated from the city and large millstones used in the processing of cereals have been found in rural sites outside the colonia at Heslington and Stamford Bridge.

In terms of the ceremonial use of food; dining scenes are used on tombstones to represent an aspirational image of the deceased in the afterlife, reclining on a couch and being served food and wine. The tombstones of Julia Velva, Mantinia Maercia and Aelia Aeliana each depict a dining scene. Additionally, several inhumation burials from Trentholme Drive contained hen's eggs placed in ceramic urns as grave goods for the deceased.

=== Religion ===
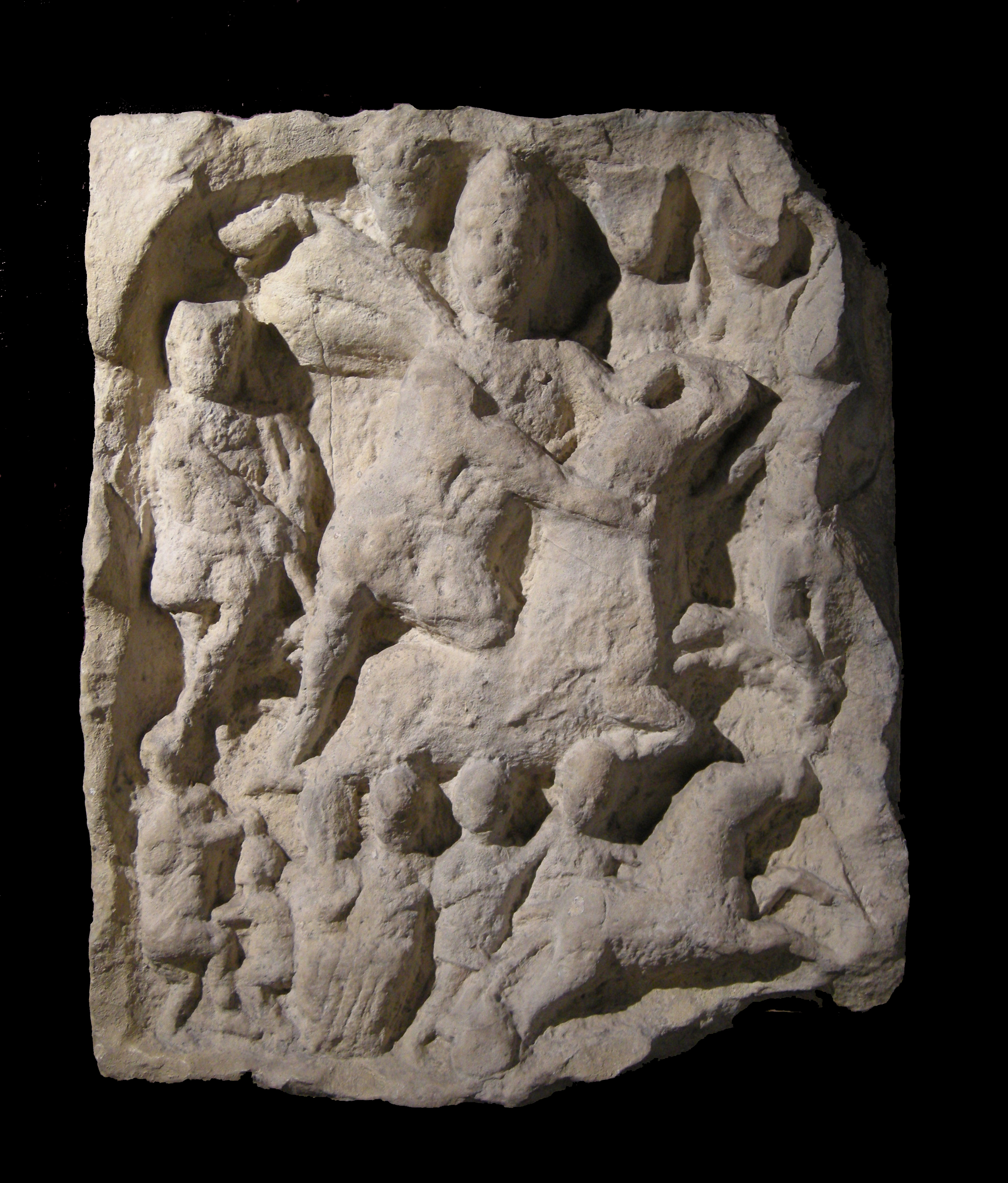
Mithraic tauroctony scene from Micklegate, evidence of the cult of Mithras in Eboracum.

A range of evidence of Roman religious beliefs among the people of Eboracum have been found including altars to Mars, Hercules, Jupiter and Fortune. In terms of number of references, the most popular deities were the spiritual representation (genius) of Eboracum and the Mother Goddess. There is also evidence of local and regional deities. Evidence showing the worship of eastern deities has also been found during excavations in York. For example, evidence of the Mithras cult, which was popular among the military, has been found including a sculpture showing Mithras slaying a bull and a dedication to Arimanius, the god of evil in the Mithraic tradition. The Mithraic relief located in Micklegate suggests the location of a temple to Mithras right in the heart of the Colonia. Another example is the dedication of a temple to Serapis a Hellenistic-Egyptian God by the Commander of the Sixth Legion, Claudius Hieronymianus. Other known deities from the city include: Tethys, Veteris, Venus, Silvanus, Toutatis, Chnoubis and the Imperial Numen.

There was also a Christian community in Eboracum although it is unknown when this was first formed and in archaeological terms there is virtually no record of it. The first evidence of this community is a document noting the attendance of Bishop Eborius of Eboracum at the Council of Arles (314). The Episcopal see at Eboracum was called Eboracensis in Latin and Bishops from the See also attended the First Council of Nicaea in 325, the Council of Serdica, and the Council of Ariminum. The name is preserved in the abbreviated form Ebor as the official name of the archbishop of York.

=== Death and burial ===
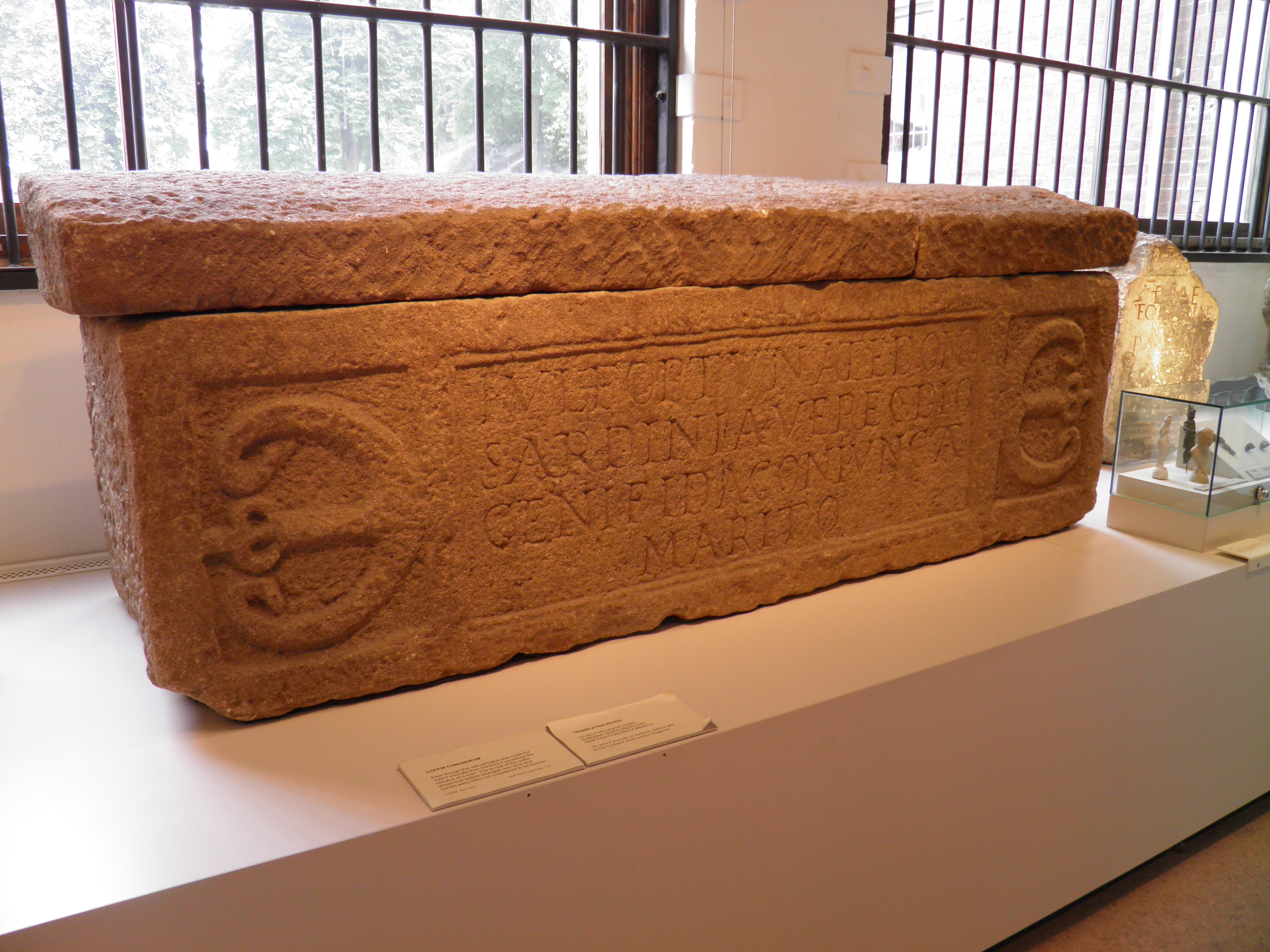
Sarcophagus of Julia Fortunata, found in 1887; now in the Yorkshire Museum

The cemeteries of Roman York follow the major Roman roads out of the settlement; excavations in the Castle Yard (next to Clifford's Tower), beneath the railway station, at Trentholme Drive and the Mount have located significant evidence of human remains using both inhumation and cremation burial rites. Around 400 burials were found at the Trentholme Drive cemetery, consisting of 53 cremations and 350 inhumations. The number of burials at the railway station was not recorded during excavation, but a sample of 51 skulls was retained. Both cemeteries were used between the 2nd and 4th centuries.

The cemetery beneath the railway station was subject to excavations in advance of railway works of 1839–41, 1845, and 1870–7. Several sarcophagi were unearthed during this phase of excavations including those of Flavius Bellator and Julia Fortunata. Inhumation burial in sarcophagi can often include the body being encased in gypsum and then in a lead coffin. Variations on this combination exist. The gypsum casts, when found undisturbed, frequently retain a cast impression of the deceased in a textile shroud – surviving examples of both adults and children show a selection of textiles used to wrap the body before interment, but usually plain woven cloth. The high number of sarcophagi from Eboracum has provided a large number of these casts, in some cases with cloth surviving adhered to the gypsum. Two gypsum burials at York have shown evidence for frankincense and another clear markers of Pistacia spp. (mastic) resin used as part of the funerary rite. These resins had been traded to Eboracum from the Mediterranean and eastern Africa, or southern Arabia, the latter known as the "Frankincense Kingdom" in antiquity This is the northernmost confirmed use of aromatic resins in mortuary contexts during the Roman period.

An excavation in advance of building work underneath the Yorkshire Museum in 2010 located a male skeleton with significant pathology to suggest that he may have died as a gladiator in Eboracum.

== Economy ==
The military presence at Eboracum was the driving force behind early developments in its economy. In these early stages, Eboracum operated as a command economy with workshops growing up outside the fortress to supply the needs of the 5,000 troops garrisoned there. Production included military pottery until the mid-3rd century, military tile kilns have been found in the Aldwark-Peasholme Green area, glassworking at Coppergate, metalworks and leatherworks producing military equipment in Tanner Row.

In the Roman period, Eboracum was the major manufacturing centre for Whitby Jet. Known as gagates in Latin, it was used from the early 3rd century as material for jewellery and was exported from here throughout Britain and into Europe. Examples found in York take the form of rings, bracelets, necklaces, and pendants depicting married couples and the Medusa. There are fewer than 25 jet pendants in the Roman world, of which six are known from Eboracum. These are housed in the Yorkshire Museum.

=== Roads ===
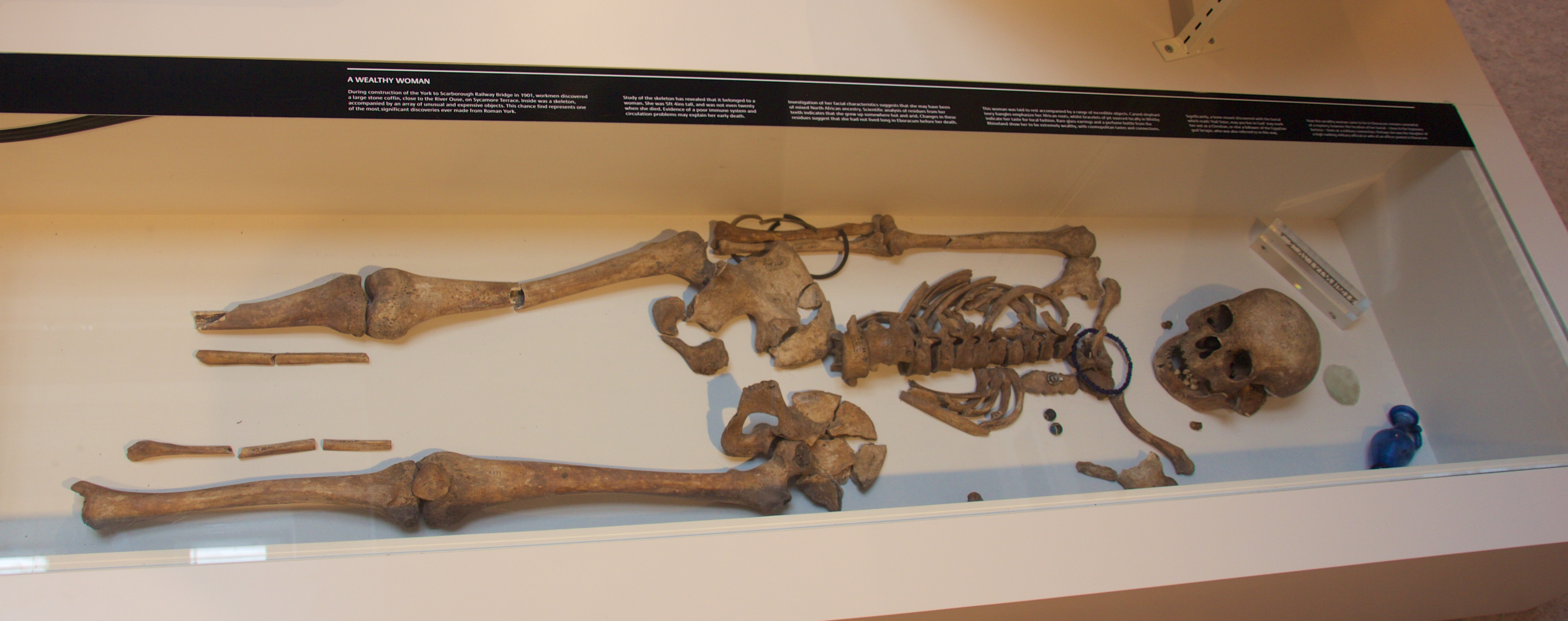
During construction of the York to Scarborough Railway Bridge in 1901, workmen discovered a large stone coffin, close to the River Ouse. Inside was a skeleton, accompanied by an array of unusual and expensive objects. This chance find represents one of the most significant discoveries ever made from Roman York.

The true paths of all original Roman roads leading out of Eboracum are not known, although eleven have been suggested. The known roads include Dere Street leading North-West from the city through Clifton towards the site of Cataractonium (modern Catterick), Cade's Road Towards Petuaria (modern Brough), and Ermine Street towards Lindum (modern Lincoln). A road bypassing the south wall of the fortress, between the fortress and the River Ouse has not been formally planned, although its path is conjectured to run beneath the York Museum Gardens.

=== Rivers ===
The River Ouse and River Foss provided important access points for the importation of heavy goods. The existence of two possible wharves on the east bank of the River Foss support this idea. A large deposit of grain, in a timber structure beneath modern-day Coney Street, on the north-east bank of the River Ouse suggests the existence of storehouses for moving goods via the river.

== Late Roman York ==
The decline of Roman Britain in early fifth century AD led to significant social and economic changes all over Britain. Whilst the latest datable inscription referencing Eboracum dates from 237 AD, the continuation of the settlement after this time is certain. Building work in the city continued in the fourth century under Constantine and later Count Theodosius. The locally produced Crambeck Ware pottery arrived in Eboracum in the fourth century—the most famous form being intricately decorated buff-yellow "parchment ware" painted with bright shades of red. The effect of Constantine's religious policy allowed the greater development of Christianity in Roman Britain—a bishop of York named "Eborius" is attested here and several artifacts decorated with chi-rho symbols are known. Additionally, a small bone plaque from an inhumation grave bore the phrase SOROR AVE VIVAS IN DEO ("Hail sister may you live in God").

The Trentholme Drive cemetery was used between the 2nd and 4th centuries. A cemetery active between the 2nd and 4th centuries was discovered at Driffield Terrace. Genome analysis of seven individuals discovered in the cemetery showed that six were consistent with indigenous Britons, with the seventh person may have originated from the Middle East. The study found that the genetic signature of the region had since changed possibly due to Anglo-Saxon migrations in the Early Middle Ages. Late Ebor Ware is a distinctive type of pottery made in York, that is thought to be evidence of the presence of North African people due to differences between other pottery wares typical of Roman Britain and similarities with ceramics found in North Africa.

Changes in the layout of both the fort and colonia occurred in the late fourth century AD, suggested as representing a social change in the domestic lives of the military garrison here whereby they might have lived in smaller family groups with wives, children or other civilians.

== Rediscovery of Roman York ==
The rediscovery and modern understanding of Eboracum began in the 17th century. Several prominent figures have been involved in this process. Martin Lister was the first to recognise that the Multangular Tower was Roman in date in a 1683 paper with the Royal Society. John Horsley's 1732 Britannia Romana, or "The Roman Antiquities of Britain", included a chapter on Roman York and at least partly informed Francis Drake's 1736 Eboracum—the first book of its kind on Roman York. Drake also published accounts in the Philosophical Transactions of the Royal Society.

The Rev. Charles Wellbeloved was one of the founders of the Yorkshire Philosophical Society and a curator of the antiquities in the Yorkshire Museum until his death in 1858. He published a systematic account of Roman York titled Eboracum or York under the Romans in 1842, including first hand records of discoveries during excavations in 1835. William Hargrove brought many new discoveries to the attention of the public through published articles in his newspaper the Herald and the Courant and published a series of guides with references to casual finds.

The first large-scale excavations were undertaken by S. Miller from Glasgow University in the 1920s with a focus on the defences.

== Archaeological remains ==
Substantial physical remains have been excavated in York in the last two centuries including the city walls, the legionary bath-house and headquarters building, civilian houses, workshops, storehouses and cemeteries.

=== Visible remains ===
- Remains of the Roman Basilica building, at the north side of the Principia are visible in the undercroft of York Minster. A column found during excavations and a modern statue of Constantine the Great are located outside.
- The multangular tower of York city walls is a multi-period structure based on the south-west corner tower of the Roman Legionary Fortress. It is within the York Museum Gardens.
- The Roman Bath pub and museum (St Sampson's Square) displays remains of the military bath-house.
- A fragment of foundations of the western curtain wall is visible through a glass floor in a cafe near Bootham bar.
- A large number of Roman finds are now housed in the Yorkshire Museum. The York Museum Gardens have Roman sarcophagi on open display.

== See also ==
- History of York
- Roman Britain
- Seal of New York City which is inscribed Sigillum Civitatis Novi Eboraci

== Bibliography ==
- Allason-Jones, Lindsay (1996). Roman Jet in the Yorkshire Museum. York: Yorkshire Museum. ISBN 9780905807171.
- Baines, Edward, ed. (1823). History, directory & gazetteer, of the county of York, Vol. II. Leeds: Leeds Mercury Office – via archive.org.
- Collingwood, R. G., ed. (1965). Roman Inscriptions of Britain, Vol I. Oxford: Clarendon Press.
- Drake, Francis (1736). Eboracum or the History and Antiquities of the City of York. LCCN 03016196.
- Groom, N. (1981). Frankincense and Myrrh: a Study of the Arabian Incense Trade. Longman. ISBN 9780582764767.
- Hall, Richard (1996) [1996]. English Heritage: Book of York (1st ed.). B.T. Batsford Ltd. ISBN 0-7134-7720-2.
- Hartley, Elizabeth (1985). Roman Life at the Yorkshire Museum. The Yorkshire Museum. ISBN 0-905807-02-2.
- Leach, Stephany; Lewis, Mary; Chenery, Carolyn; Müldner, Gundula; Eckardt, Hella (2009). "Migration and diversity in Roman Britain: A multidisciplinary approach to the identification of immigrants in Roman York, England". American Journal of Physical Anthropology. 140 (3): 546–561. doi:10.1002/ajpa.21104. ISSN 1096-8644.
- Nègre, Ernest (1990). Toponymie générale de la France (in French). Librairie Droz. ISBN 9782600028837.
- Ottaway, Patrick (2013). Roman Yorkshire: People, Culture and Landscape. Pickering: Blackthorn Press. ISBN 9781906259334.
- Ottaway, Patrick (2004). Roman York. Stroud: Tempus. ISBN 0-7524-2916-7.
- RCHME (1962). An Inventory of the Historical Monuments in City of York, Volume 1, Eburacum, Roman York (Royal Commission on Historical Monuments England) – via British History Online.
- Wellbeloved, c. 1852 (1st edition). A descriptive account of the antiquities in the grounds and in the Museum of the Yorkshire Philosophical Society
- Willis, Ronald (1988). The illustrated portrait of York (4th ed.). Robert Hale Limited. ISBN 0-7090-3468-7.
