= Legio VI Victrix =

Roman legion

- Map of the Roman Empire in AD 125, under emperor Hadrian, showing the LEGIO VI VICTRIX, stationed on Eboracum (York, England), in Britannia province, from AD 119 until the 4th century
- Active: 41 BC to after 2nd century
- Country: Roman Republic and Roman Empire
- Type: Roman legion (Marian)
- Role: Infantry assault (some cavalry support)
- Size: Varied over unit lifetime.
- Garrison/HQ: Perusia (41 BC)
- Nicknames: Victrix, "Victorious"
- Engagements: Perusia (41 BC); Cantabrian wars (29–19 BC)

Commanders
- Notable commanders: Galba

Legio VI Victrix ("Victorious Sixth Legion") was a legion of the Imperial Roman army founded in 41 BC by the general Octavian (who, as Augustus, later became Rome's first emperor). It was the twin legion of VI Ferrata and perhaps held veterans of that legion, and some soldiers kept to the traditions of the Caesarian legion.

== In Republican service ==
The legion saw its first action in Perusia in 41 BC. It also served against Sextus Pompeius, who occupied Sicily and made threats to discontinue sending grain to Rome. In 31 BC the legion fought in the Battle of Actium against Mark Antony.

== In Imperial service ==
=== VI Victrix in Spain ===
The legion took part in the final stage of the Roman conquest of Hispania, participating in Augustus' major war against the Cantabrians, from 29 BC to 19 BC, that brought all of the Iberian Peninsula under Roman rule.

The legion stayed in Spain for nearly a century and received the surname Hispaniensis, founding the city of Legio (modern-day León). Soldiers of this unit and X Gemina numbered among the first settlers of Caesaraugusta, what became modern-day Zaragoza. The cognomen Victrix (Victorious) dates back to the reign of Nero. But Nero was unpopular in the area, and when the governor of Hispania Tarraconensis, Galba, said he wished to overthrow Nero, the legion supported him and he was proclaimed Emperor in the VI Victrix legionary camp. Galba created VII Gemina and marched on Rome, where Nero killed himself.

=== VI Victrix in Germany ===
For a brief period (approximately 110 AD to 119), the legion was stationed along the Rhine river in the province of Germania Inferior.

=== VI Victrix in Britain ===
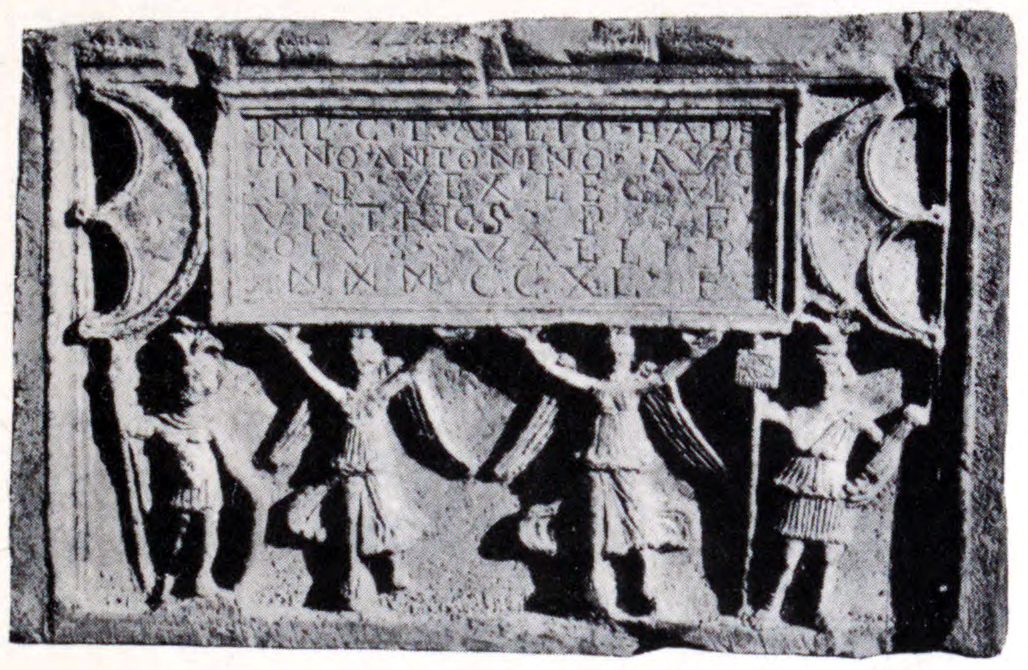
Distance Slab of Legio VI found near Cleddans on the Antonine Wall

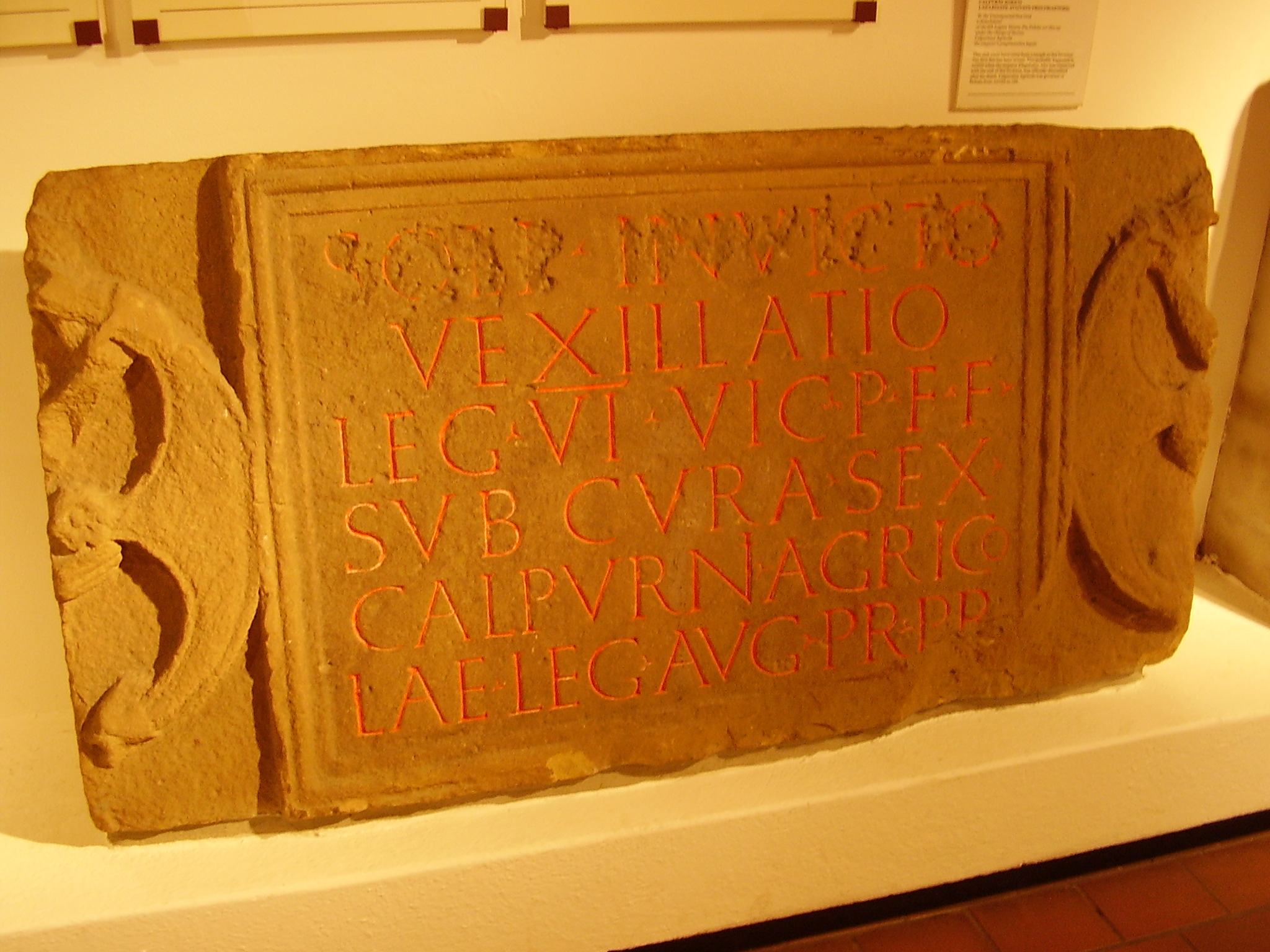
Dedication to Sol Invictus by a vexillatio of the VIth, (Corbridge, Northumberland, 162–168).

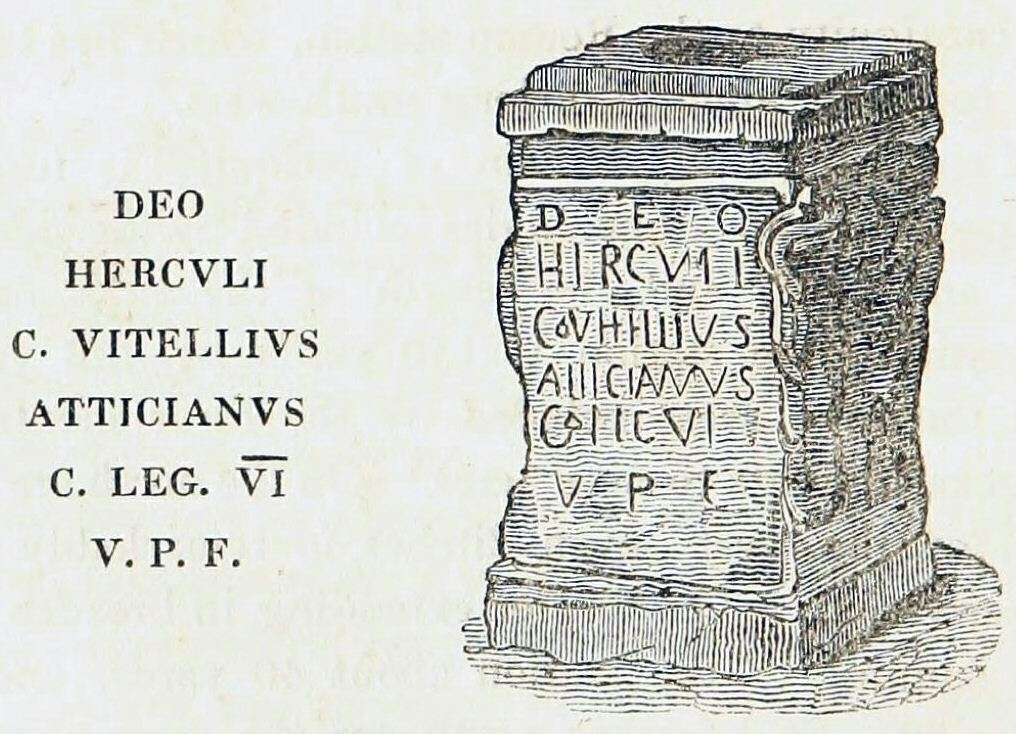
Altar to Hercules, naming Gaius Vitellius Atticanus, Centurion of the Legio VI Victrix, at Whitley Castle (Epiacum) in southern Northumberland. Illustration by Thomas Sopwith, 1833. The altar is now in Bedford Museum.

In 119, Hadrian relocated the legion to northern Britannia, to assist those legions already present in quelling the resistance there. Victrix was key in securing victory, and would eventually replace the diminished IX Hispana at Eboracum. In 122 the legion started work on Hadrian's Wall which would sustain the peace for two decades.

Twenty years later, they helped construct the Antonine Wall and its forts such as Castlecary and Croy Hill but it was largely abandoned by 164. In 2020 a replica of the Eastermains stone was installed in Twechar. The original was found on Eastermains Farm (which adjoins Whitehill), west of Inchbelly Bridge, east of Kirkintilloch and is often associated with Auchendavy. It has been scanned and a video produced. It is similar to two other distance slabs of the Sixth Legion on the Antonine Wall.

In 175, the Roman emperor, Marcus Aurelius, defeated the Iazyges tribe of Sarmatians. He took them into Roman service and settled 5,500 of them in Britain; it has been claimed without evidence and contrary to legionary recruitment practices that some were assigned to Legio VI Victrix based in York. The only detachment attested in Britain is a unit at Ribchester, south of Lancaster. Less certain is evidence from Bainesse, near Catterick, where lost tiles apparently stamped BSAR may be evidence for the presence of a Sarmatian unit there.

Legio VI was awarded the honorary title "Britannica" by Commodus in AD 184 following his own adoption of the title.

In 185, the British legions mutinied and put forward one legate Priscus, a commander of their own (about whom little other information is known, but possibly Caerellius Priscus), to replace the unpopular Emperor Commodus, but the former declined. The mutiny was suppressed by Pertinax, who would later become emperor himself after Commodus was murdered.

The large fort at Carpow in Scotland was occupied from about 184 by Legio VI who completed the fort with the principia and praetorium which they roofed with tiles bearing their new cognomen.

The Legate of the legion in the late second century, Claudius Hieronymianus, dedicated a temple to Serapis in Eboracum in advance of the arrival of Septimius Severus in AD208.

An altar to Hercules was dedicated by Gaius Vitellius Atticianus, Centurion of the Legio VI Victrix, at Whitley Castle (Epiacum), illustrated above left.

== Attested members ==
Name	Rank	Time frame	Province	Source
Marcus Pompeius Macrinus Neos Theophanes	legatus legionis	between 100 and 110	Germania Inferior	CIL XIV, 3599
Publius Tullius Varro	legatus legionis	118	Britannica	CIL X, 3364
Lucius Valerius Propinquus	legatus legionis	c. 120	Britannica	CIL II, 6084
Lucius Minicius Natalis Quadronius Verus	legatus legionis	c. 130	Britannica	CIL XIV, 3599
Publius Mummius Sisenna Rutilianus	legatus legionis	c. 135	Britannica	CIL XIV, 3601
Quintus Antonius Isauricus	legatus legionis	Late 140s	Britannica	CIL VII, 233
Lucius Junius Victorinus Flavius Caelianus	legatus legionis	150s	Britannica	
Quintus Camurius Numisius Junior	legatus legionis	155-158	Britannica	CIL XI, 5670
Claudius Hieronymianus	legatus legionis	between 190 and 212	Britannica	CIL VII, 240
Gaius Minicius Italus	tribunus angusticlavius	c. 80	Hispania Tarraconensis	CIL VIII, 875 = ILS 1374; CIL III, 12053
Marcus Macrinius Avitus Catonius Vindex	tribunus angusticlavius	160s	Britannica	CIL VI, 1449
Publius Helvius Pertinax	tribunus angusticlavius	170s	Britannica	
Lucius Funisulanus Vettonianus	tribunus laticlavius	c. 58	Hispania Tarraconensis	CIL III, 4013; CIL XI, 571
Gaius Calpetanus Rantius Quirinalis Valerius Festus	tribunus laticlavius	c. 60	Hispania Tarraconensis	CIL V, 531 = ILS 989
Marcus Pontius Laelianus	tribunus laticlavius	122-124?	Britannica	CIL VI, 1497
Quintus Licinius Silvanus Granianus Quadronius Proculus	tribunus laticlavius	120s	Britannica	CIL II, 4609
Aulus Titius Severus	centurio	89-122	Germania Inferior	CIL XIII, 8174

== Epigraphic inscriptions ==
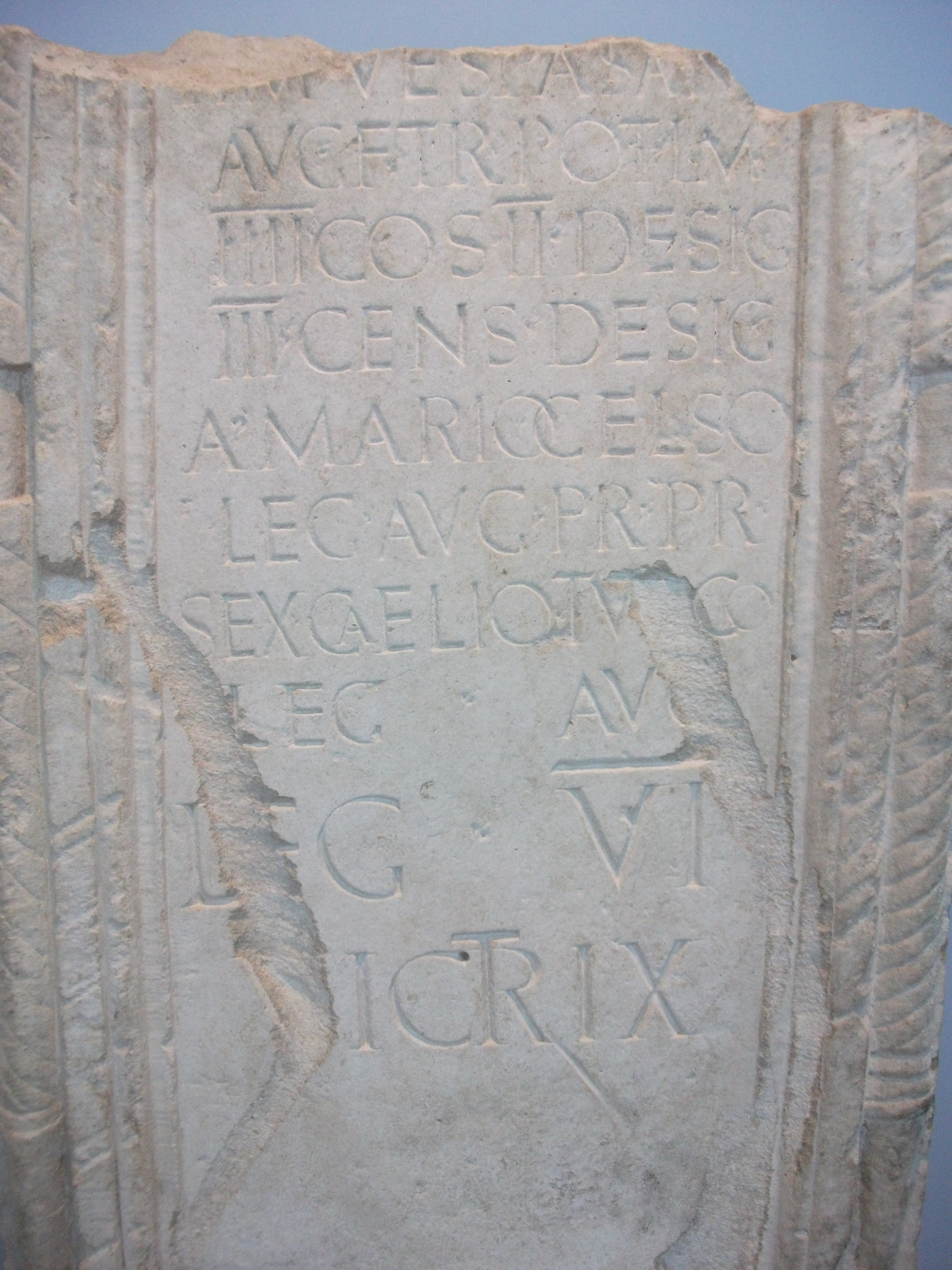
Inscription from Wesel, dating to AD 50–60

- - Dis Manibus Gai Iuli Galeria tribu Caleni Lugduno veterani ex legione VI Victrice Pia Fideli heres a se memoriae fecit. Lincoln (Lindum), U.K. RIB 252 = CIL VII 182.
- - Dis Manibus sacrum Nig̣ṛiṇae vixit annos XXXX Aurelius Casitto legionis VI Victricis Piae Fidelis curavit. Great Chesters (Aesica), U.K. RIB 1746 = CIL VII 740.
- - Dis Manibus Titi Flavi Flavini legionis VI Victricis Classicius Aprilis heres prius quam obiret fieri iussit. York (Eboracum), U.K. RIB 675.
- - Dis Manibus Lucius Bebius Augusta (tribu) Crescens Vindelicum miles legionis VI Victricis Piae Fidelis annorum XLIII stipendiorum XXIII heres amico faciendum curavit. York (Eboracum), U.K. RIB 671.
- - Dis Manibus Flaviae Augustinae vixit annos XXXVIIII menses VII dies XI filius Saenius Augustinus vixit annum I dies III vixit annum I menses VIIII dies V Gaius Aeresius Saenus veteranus legionis VI Victricis coniugi carissimae et sibi faciendum curavit. York (Eboracum), U.K. RIB 685 = CIL VII 245.
- - Dis Manibus Gaius Iulius Gai filius colonia Flavia Ingenuus miles legionis VI Victricis Piae Fidelis. High Rochester (Bremenium), U.K. RIB 1292 = CIL VII 1057.
- - Dis Manibus Flavius Agricola miles legionis VI Victricis vixit annos XLII dies X Albia Faustina coniugi inconparabili faciendum curavit. London (Londinium), U.K. CIL V 25.
- -Lucio Pompeio Luci filio / Quirina (tribu) Faventino / praefecto cohortis VI Asturum / tribuno militum legionis VI Victricis (...). Astorga (Asturica), Spain. CIL II 2637 = AE 1966, 187.
- - Lucius Valerius Silvanus / miles legionis VI Victricis / Deo Turiaco / votum solvit libens merito. Porto (Portus), Portugal. CIL II 2374 = AE 1959, 103. ·
- - Titus Pompeius Titi filius / Tromentina (tribu) / Albinus' domo Vienna / IIvir tribunus militum legionis VI Victricis. Mérida (Emerita Augusta), Spain. AE 2002, 929.
- - Dis Manibus sacrum Gaius Iulius Severus veteranus legionis VI Victricis annorum LXI Iulia Danae liberta ex testamento (...).Mérida (Emerita Augusta), Spain. CIL II 490.
- - Marcus Tavonius / Marci filius / Romilia (tribu) / Firmus domo Ateste / miles legionis VI Victricis (...). Mérida, Spain. Museo Nacional de Arte Romano - Mérida.
- - Dis Manibus sacrum / Gaius Iulius Severus / veteranus legionis VI Victricis / annorum LXI / Iulia Danae liberta ex testamento (...). Mérida, Spain. CIL II 490.
- - Dis Manibus sacrum Lucius Maelonius Aper veteranus legionis VI Victricis Piae Fidelis annorum LXX militavit beneficiarius (...). Mérida, Spain. CIL II 491.
- - Dis Manibus sacrum / Lucius Maelonius Aper / veteranus legionis VI Victricis Piae Fidelis annorum LXX / militavit beneficiarius (...). Mérida, Spain. CIL II 491.
- - Legio VI victrix. Moers, Nordrhein-Westfalen. AE 2005, 1069b.
- - Lucius Helvius Luci filius / Papiria tribu / Rebilus Augustanus / veteranus legionis VI Victricis. Mérida, Spain. AE 2006, 616.

== In popular culture ==
The legion is mentioned in Robert Heinlein's novel Have Space Suit – Will Travel and in the book From Scythia to Camelot by C. Scott Littleton and Linda A. Malcor. It is also mentioned in the video game Total War: Attila as the only Western Roman legion in Britannia

== Reenactment ==
A modern reenactment group based in Los Angeles reenacts this legion.

Another one exists based in Denmark and Sweden found under the name Legionord

Legio VI Victrix, Eboracum reenacts this legion in York.

The Antonine Guard, a living history society based in Scotland, recreates a unit of Legio VI during the Antonine occupation of Caledonia in the 2nd century AD.

== See also ==
- List of Roman legions
