= Ala Gallorum Picentiana =

The Ala Gallorum Picentiana ("Ala of Gauls of Picens") was a Roman auxiliary cavalry unit. It is attested by military diplomas, inscriptions and the Historiae by Tacitus. The complete name Ala Gallorum Picentiana is only used in the military diplomas of 122, in all other diplomas and most of the inscriptions the name Ala Picentiana is used. In two inscriptions and in the Historiae it is referred to as Ala Picentina.

== Name ==
- Ala: The ala was a cavalry unit of the auxilia in the Imperial Roman army.
- Gallorum: of Gauls. The soldiers of the ala were recruited from the different tribes of Gauls, when the unit was formed. This part of the name is only used in the military diplomas issued in the year 122.
- Picentiana or Picentina: of Picens. The cavalry units initially recruited from Gauls often used the name of one of their first commanders. Emil Ritterling and Eric Birley assumed, that the unit took its name from Lucius Rustius Picens.

Since there is no indication, that the unit was an Ala milliaria (1000 strong), it is assumed, that it was an Ala quingenaria. The authorized strength was therefore 480 men, consisting of 16 Turmae with 30 cavalrymen each.

== History ==
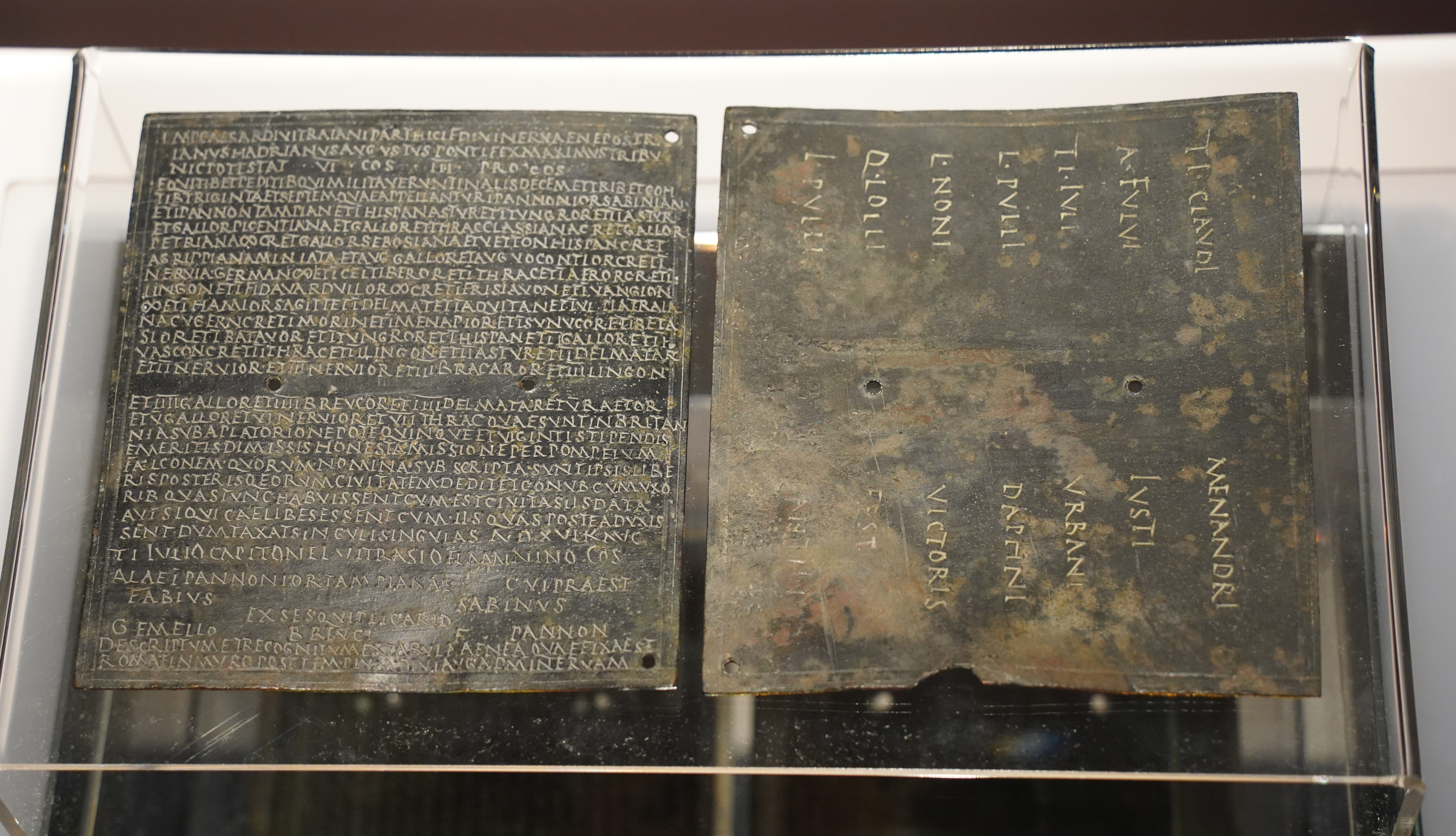
One of the military diplomas issued in 122 (CIL XVI, 69)

The Ala was initially part of the Roman army in Germania Inferior and Germania Superior, when these two territories were still part of the Roman province Gallia Belgica, and afterwards part of the army in the province Britannia. It is attested by military diplomas from AD 74 through 124.

Military diplomas
Military diploma in the Epigraphik-Datenbank Clauss-Slaby (EDCS)	Date in the EDCS	Garrisoned in	In the military diploma the ala is listed as; Expansions and restorations are marked with () and [], see Leiden Conventions.
CIL XVI, 20	74	Germania	Picentiana // Picentiana
RMM-00002	75/76	Germania	Picenti]ana
CIL XVI, 28	82	Germania	Picentiana // Picentiana
AE 2004, 1900	122	Britannia	[alae G]allor(um) Picentian[ae cui praeest Ti(berius?) Clau]dius(?) Priscian[us
CIL XVI, 69	122	Britannia	Gallorum Picentian(a) // Gallor(um) Picentiana
CIL XVI, 70	124	Britannia	Picen[ti]a[n(a)]

The origins of the ala are unknown; the date of its formation and the provinces, in which it was displaced originally, can only be surmised. Géza Alföldy assumed, that the unit was raised in Gaul during the early Principate and was initially garrisoned there. Ernst Stein assumed, that the unit was garrisoned in Dalmatia, since the inscription of Lucius Rustius Picens was found there; Stein assumed, that it was transferred to Germania in the aftermath of the Clades Variana.

The first datable proof of its existence is given by Tacitus; he mentions the unit with the name Ala Picentina in his work Historiae (book IV, 62), describing the events during the revolt of the Batavi around 69/70 and says, that it was attached to Legio XVI Gallica. In the aftermath of the revolt of the Batavi the ala was transferred to Germania Superior. The first proof, that the unit was part of the Roman army in Germania Superior is a military diploma dated to AD 74. Two additional diplomas, dated 75/76 and 82, attest the ala in the same territory.

The unit was transferred to Britannia at an unknown date. Conrad Cichorius assumed, that the transfer occurred between 82 and 90, because of the invasion of Caledonia, which was undertaken by Gnaeus Julius Agricola. Géza Alföldy also assumed, that this transfer occurred between 82 and 90. The first proof, that the unit was part of the Roman army in Britannia are two military diplomas dated to AD 122. It is attested in the province by one additional diploma, dated to 124.

== Stations ==
Garrisons in Germania Inferior and Germania Superior were:

- Novaesium (Neuss): according to Tacitus the ala was attached to Legio XVI Gallica during the revolt of the Batavi. There is no proof of its garrison in Neuss, but as an auxiliary unit of Legio XVI Gallica it must have been in garrisoned in Neuss or its surroundings.
- Mogontiacum (Mainz): three inscriptions were found here. The ala was garrisoned either in Mainz or its surroundings.

Two inscriptions were found in Derventio, located beneath the modern town of Malton. The ala was either garrisoned in Derventio or stayed there temporarily.

== Members ==
The following members of the ala are known:

=== Commanders ===
- Ti(berius?) Clau]dius(?) Priscian[us]: he is attested by one of the diplomas of 122 (AE 2004, 1900).
- [] Can[didus], a praefectus (AE 1975, 559)
- Lucius Pupius Praesens, a praefectus
- Lucius Rustius Picens, a praefectus

=== Others ===
- []us Paturi [fil(ius)], a cavalryman (CIL XIII, 11869)
- Abaius [] f(ilius), a cavalryman (AE 1962, 290)
- Aur(elius) Macrinus, (Note: In the inscription the name of the unit is not given; John Spaul assigns Aurelius Macrinus, a former member of the Equites singulares, to the Ala Picentiana.) a cavalryman (RIB-01, 00714)
- C(aius) Iulius []s, a Decurio (CIL XIII, 7296)
- Silius Attonis f(ilius), a cavalryman (CIL XIII, 6277)

== See also ==
- List of Roman auxiliary regiments

== Bibliography ==
- John E. H. Spaul: Ala². The Auxiliary Cavalry Units of the Pre-Diocletianic Imperial Roman Army. Nectoreca Press, Andover 1994, ISBN 0-9525062-0-3, pp. 185–186.
