= Claudius Hieronymianus =

3rd-century Roman legate

- Military career
- Allegiance: Roman Empire
- Service years: c. 190–c. 212
- Rank: Legate, Governor
- Commands: Legio VI Victrix; Cappadocia
- Conflicts: Roman invasion of Caledonia 208–210

Claudius Hieronymianus was a Roman Legate, commanding the 6th Legion in Britain during the military campaigns in Caledonia under Septimius Severus. He later served as the Governor of Cappadocia.

== Career ==
Claudius Hieronymianus is named in only a few scant references. The dedication stone at Eboracum (present-day York) naming Hieronymianus is dated to some point between AD 190 and AD 212, when he was acting as Legate of the 6th Legion then garrisoned at Eboracum. By AD 212 he was acting as Governor of Cappadocia.

== Personal life ==
The legate is mentioned in a passage of Tertullian's Address to Scapula Tertullus: during his governorship of Cappadocia and supposedly angry at his wife's conversion to Christianity, he brought (in Tertullian's words) "much ill to the Christians" there. His own pagan religious views are expressed in a dedication stone from York (Eboracum) in which he is named as the benefactor of a freshly re-built Roman temple dedicated to the god Serapis.

=== Temple to Serapis at York ===
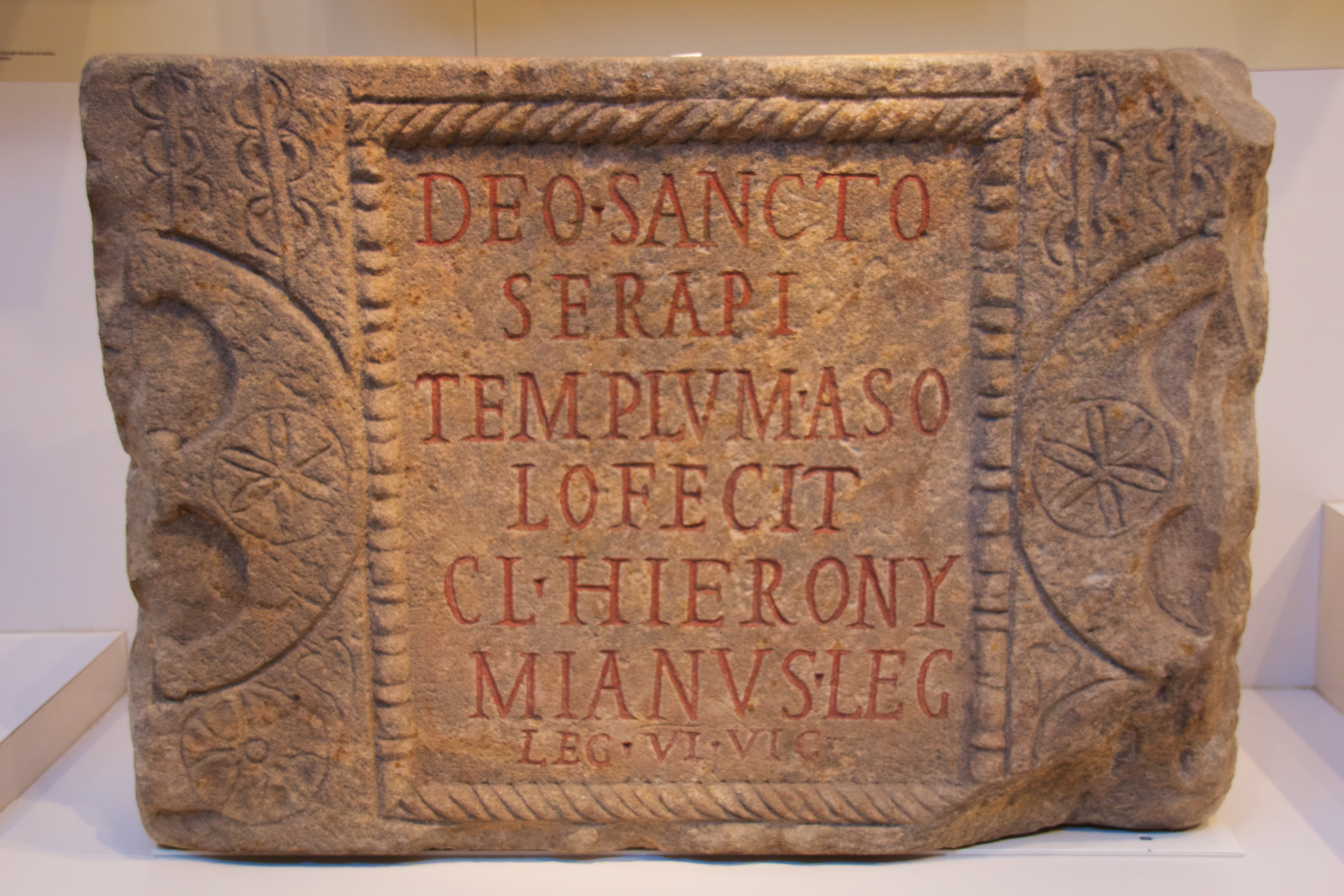
The dedication stone in the Yorkshire Museum, recording the rebuilding of a temple to Serapis by the Legate of the 6th Legion

The dedication bearing his name was found in 1770 in Toft Green, York. A report in the 1775 edition of Archaeologia reports its discovery:

In August 1770, a stone was found in digging a cellar at York, at a place called the Friar's-Garden, one of the highest parts of the city. The workmen, in their progress, came to the foundation of an old building of Roman brick, the mortar or cement of which, was so hard as not to be penetrable by the Sharpest tools, the bricks breaking before the mortar... In digging the ground a little further, within the segment of the circle abovementioned, the men found a large gritstone, three feet long, two feet one inch broad, and eight inches thick.

The stone inscription reads: DEO SANCTO / SERAPI / TEMPLUM A SO / LO FECIT CL(audius) HIERONY / MIANUS LEG(atus) / LEG(ionis) VI VIC(tricis)

To the holy god Serapis Claudius Hieronymianus, legate of the Sixth Legion Victrix, built this temple from the ground.

It has been argued that the temple was built in advance of the arrival of Septimius Severus at Eboracum in AD208. Severus is known to have been a prominent follower of Serapis; Hieronymianus was thus demonstrating his close connection to the Emperor and his Romanitas.
