= L. P. Wenham =

British archaeologist (1911–1990)

Leslie Peter Wenham FSA
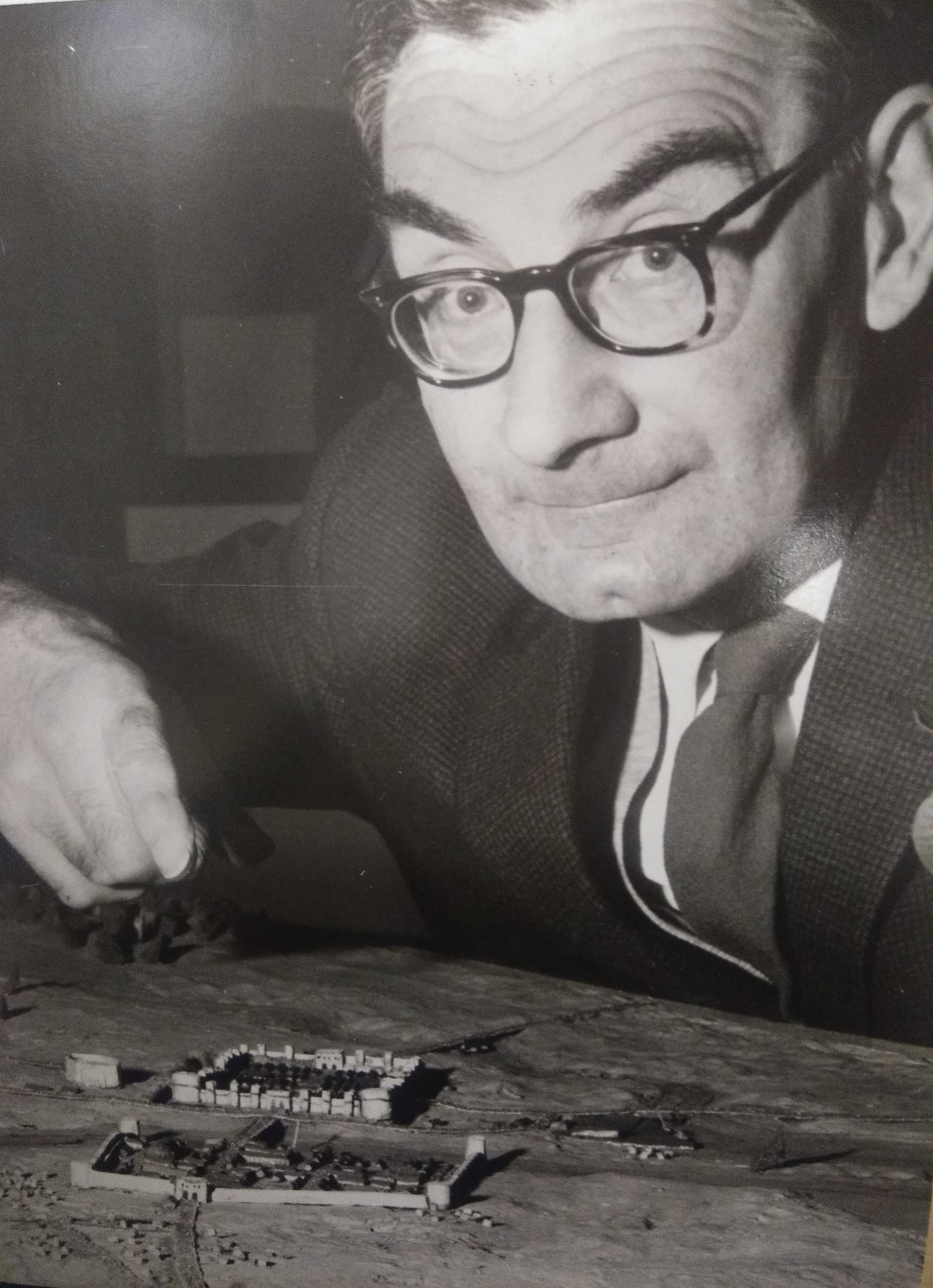
- L. P. Wenham with a model of Roman York
- Born: 1911; Richmond, North Yorkshire, England
- Died: 29 January 1990 (aged 78); Richmond, North Yorkshire, England
- Citizenship: United Kingdom
- Education: University of Durham
- Known for: Excavation in York and extensive publication in archaeology
- Scientific career
- Fields: History; Archaeology
- Workplaces: University of York
- Academic advisors: Eric Birley

Leslie Peter Wenham FSA (1911 – 29 January 1990) was a British archaeologist, historian, and professor who excavated in York, on Hadrian's Wall and Malton. He was the first to produce a comprehensive report of a Romano-British Cemetery.

He is known for his extensive publications in archaeology. He was elected a Fellow of the Society of Antiquaries of London in 1970. Wenham served with the Royal Army Ordnance Corps during the Second World War.

== Education and work ==
Wenham graduated from Durham University in 1933 with an honours degree in modern history. He spent some time excavating under Eric Birley in the civilian settlement at Housesteads Roman Fort on Hadrian's Wall. During the Second World War he served with the Royal Army Ordnance Corps. In 1951, he was appointed lecturer in history at St. John's College, York. He would later become head of the History department and remained part of the college until his retirement in 1974.

Wenham was a prolific excavator in and around York, frequently publishing his excavations with the Yorkshire Archaeological Society. He had a particular interest in the defences of the Fortress at Eboracum (modern day York). He excavated throughout the city during the 1950s, 60s and 70s, at locations including King's Square, Davygate, Petergate and St Mary Bishophill Junior, York. His excavations at Trentholme Drive resulted in the first comprehensive report of a Romano-British Cemetery; it had been excavated as part of an archaeological investigation rather than during building work. Wenham was the editor of the Yorkshire Archaeological Journal between 1955 and 1968.

He was elected a Fellow of the Society of Antiquaries of London on 8 January 1970.

After retirement, Wenham moved to his native Richmond.

== Publications ==
- Wenham, L. P. 1954. 'Blossom Street Excavations 1953'. Yorkshire Arhchitectural and York Archaeological Society Proceedings Vol. 11. pp: 523-4
- Wenham, L. P. 1958. The History of Richmond School, Yorkshire. Herald Press
- Wenham, L. P. 1960. 'Seven archaeological discoveries in Yorkshire'. Yorkshire Archaeological Journal Vol. 40. pp: 298-328
- Wenham, L. P. 1961. 'Excavations and discoveries adjoining the south-west wall of the Roman legionary fortress in Feasegate, York, 1955-7'. Yorkshire Archaeological Journal Vol. 40. pp:329-50
- Wenham, L. P. 1962 'Excavations and discoveries within the Legionary Fortress in Davygate, York, 1955-8'.Yorkshire Archaeological Journal Vol. 40. pp:507-87
- Wenham, L. P. 1965 'The South-West defences of the Fortress of Eboracum' in Jarrett, M. G. and Dobson, B. (eds.) Britain and Rome. pp: 1-26
- Wenham, L. P. 1967 'Two Excavations: No.2 Ryethorpe Grange and Appletree Farm, York, 1959'. Transactions of the Yorkshire Philosophical Society pp: 45-60
- Wenham, L. P. 1968 'Discoveries in King's Square, York, 1963'. Yorkshire Archaeological Journal Vol. 42. pp: 165-8
- Wenham. L. P. 1968. 'Fourteen Roman Finds from York'. Yorkshire Philosophical Society Annual Report 1968. pp: 38-48
- Wenham, L.P., Warwick, R., Cooke, C., Rowbotham, T. C. 1968. The Romano-British Cemetery at Trentholme Drive, York. Ministry of Public Building and Works Archaeological Report no. 5. London: HSMO
- Wenham, L. P. 1972. 'Excavations in Low Petergate, York, 1957-8'. Yorkshire Archaeological Journal Vol. 44. pp: 65-113
- Wenham, L. P., Hall, R. A., Bride, C. M., and Stocker, D. A. 1987. St Mary Bishophill Junior and St Mary Castlegate (Archaeology of York 8/2). York: Council for British Archaeology
- Wenham, L. P. and Heywood, B. 1997. The 1968 to 1970 Excavations in the vicus at Malton, North Yorkshire (Yorkshire Archaeological Reports no.3). Leeds: Yorkshire Archaeological Society

== See also ==
- Eboracum
- Derventio Brigantum
- York City Walls
- Yorkshire Archaeological Society
