= Tom Wilkinson (footballer) =

English footballer

Personal information
- Full name: Thomas Wilkinson
- Date of birth: 26 September 1985 (age 41)
- Place of birth: Lincoln, England
- Position: Midfielder

Senior career*
Years	Team	Apps	(Gls)
2006–2007	Lincoln City	1	(0)
2007	→ Grays Athletic (loan)	?	(?)
- * Club domestic league appearances and goals as of 11 December 2023

Thomas Wilkinson (born 26 September 1985) is an English former footballer. He most recently played for Grays Athletic on loan from Lincoln City.

He made his debut in League Two for Lincoln City against Carlisle United in March 2006. He joined Grays Athletic of the National League South on loan on in January 2007 for the remainder of that season. In the summer of 2007 Lincoln were forced to release Wilkinson as a broken leg had ended his career aged 21.

He graduated from York St John University in November 2010 with a bachelor's degree in physiotherapy, after his studies were funded by the Professional Footballers' Association as part of their programme of post-career training for current and former professional footballers and academy players. He now lives in his home town of Lincoln and works as a physiotherapist at Lincoln County Hospital for the United Lincolnshire hospitals NHS trust.
