= Ivory, Jura =

Commune in Bourgogne-Franche-Comté, France

Ivory
- Commune
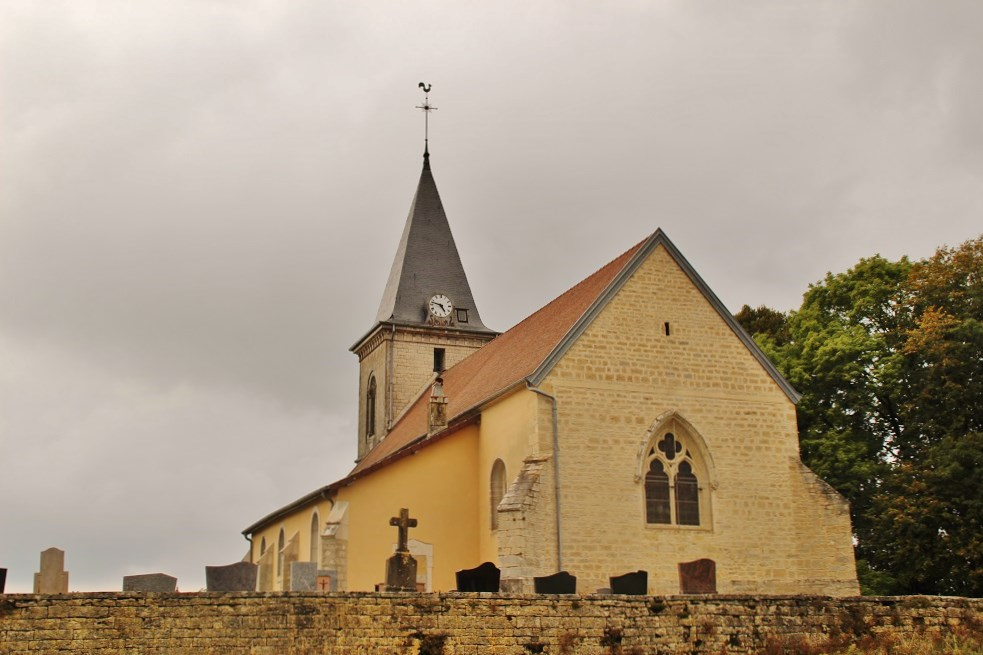
- The church in Ivory
- Location of Ivory
- Location within France Location within Bourgogne-Franche-Comté
- Coordinates: 46°54′48″N 5°51′37″E
- Country: France
- Region: Bourgogne-Franche-Comté
- Department: Jura
- Arrondissement: Dole
- Canton: Arbois

Government
  - Mayor (2020–2026): Jean-Pierre Duquet
- Area^{1}: 9.13 km^{2} (3.53 sq mi)
- Highest elevation: 632 m (2,073 ft)
- Lowest elevation: 544 m (1,785 ft)
- Population (2023): 85
  - Density: 9.3/km^{2} (24/sq mi)
- Time zone: UTC+01:00 (CET)
  - Summer (DST): UTC+02:00 (CEST)
- INSEE/Postal code: 39267 /39110
- ^{1} French Land Register data, which excludes lakes, ponds, glaciers > 1 km^{2} (0.386 sq mi or 247 acres) and river estuaries.

Ivory (French pronunciation: [ivɔʁi]) is a commune in the Jura department in Bourgogne-Franche-Comté in eastern France.

== Population ==
Historical population
Year	Pop.	±% p.a.
1968	128	—
1975	110	−2.14%
1982	126	+1.96%
1990	107	−2.02%
1999	84	−2.65%
2007	83	−0.15%
2012	85	+0.48%
2017	96	+2.46%
2023	85	−2.01%
Source: INSEE

== Old tree ==
In a farmyard in the village is a huge old lime tree. Now old and hollow, the trunk could accommodate a table for six or eight diners. It is said to have been planted to mark the marriage of Maria, nineteen-year-old daughter and heiress of Charles the Bold, Duke of Burgundy, to Prince Maximilian, son of the Holy Roman Emperor. The marriage took place on 18 August 1477. Maria's father had died in battle outside Nancy on 5 January that same year. Why plant a tree in Ivory? Who planted it? It was completely unmarked and unknown until a passing visitor told the local Tourist Board the story and the tree was ring fenced and its history recorded on a plaque.

== See also ==
- Communes of the Jura department
