= Severus Hill =

Hill in York, England

Coordinates: 53°57′35″N 1°07′03″W

- The Hills drawn by Thomas Willoughby of Birdsall, 1736.

Severus Hill is a hill that, historically, is thought to be where Roman Emperor Septimius Severus was cremated. It also contains a 4-acre former reservoir, water tower, and substation in York, North Yorkshire, England.

== History ==
The hill was thought, by antiquary Francis Drake, to have been a manmade structure by the Romans, stating that he believed "we have no room to doubt but that theſe hills were raiſed for the reaſon aforeſaid." This was disproved and, as archaeologist Charles Wellbeloved stated "formed by a far mightier power than the Roman legions". It is a 35-metre-high glacial moraine, formed during the last Ice Age, approximately 13,000 years ago.

The rumour that the site was used as Septimius Severus's cremation site began due to antiquary Francis Drake, and aligns with Roman traditions of Emperor's being cremated at the highest point outside of the Roman Fortress, which would have been Severus Hils. Francis Drake stated that "But Severus being ſlain by the Picts at York, was buried in a hill called from him Severs-ho". A Roman road prominent at the site also points to this being the site of the cremation of Severus.

By the 1800s the hill was referred to as "Beacon Hill" due to a Napoleonic Beacon being located at the site that would have been used to alert people of Napoleon's invasion.
