= York St John University =

University in York, England

Coordinates: 53.965402°N 1.080673°W

- Coat of arms
- Motto: Latin: Ut Vitam Habeant et Abundantius
- Motto in English: They may have life and have it more abundantly
- Type: Public
- Established: 1841 (The Diocesan College in York); 1974 (College of Ripon and York St John); 2006 (gained University status)
- Affiliations: ACU; Cathedrals Group; Universities UK
- Chancellor: Reeta Chakrabarti
- Vice-Chancellor: Karen Bryan
- Administrative staff: 618
- Students: 8,300 (2022)
- Undergraduates: 5,200 (2022)
- Postgraduates: 2,600 (taught) 200 (research)
- Location: York, England; London, England
- Campus: Urban
- Website: yorksj.ac.uk

Designations

Listed Building – Grade II
- Official name: University College of Ripon and York St John college building
- Designated: 1 July 1968
- Reference no.: 1257468

Listed Building – Grade II
- Official name: University College of Ripon and York St John school building
- Designated: 1 July 1968
- Reference no.: 1257441

Listed Building – Grade II
- Official name: University College of Ripon and York St John drama studio
- Designated: 24 June 1983
- Reference no.: 1257439

York St John University (originally established as York Diocesan College), often abbreviated to YSJ, is a public university located on a large urban campus in York, England. Established in 1841, it achieved university status in 2006 and in 2015 was given research degree awarding powers for PhD and other doctoral programmes.

It is one of several higher education institutions which have religious foundations and is part of the Cathedrals Group of Universities.

In 2022, there were 8,350 students, reading a wide variety of subjects, across five schools: School of the Arts; School of Education, Language and Psychology; School of Humanities; School of Science, Technology and Health; and York Business School.

== History ==
The university descends from two Anglican teacher training colleges, which were founded in York in 1841 (for men) and 1846 (for women). York St John University's founding mission was to improve access to education for people from all walks of life. In 1862, the women's college relocated to Ripon. Over the next century, the colleges gradually diversified their education programmes. The colleges, St John's College (named for John the Evangelist) and Ripon College, merged in 1974 to form the "College of Ripon and York St John". The principal college building and school building, both on Lord Mayor's Walk, were designated Grade II listed structures in 1968. The drama studio, formerly a chapel, was Grade II listed in 1983.

In 1990, the combined institution formally became a college of the University of Leeds; this arrangement allowed it to award degrees in the name of the latter, while remaining in practice largely autonomous. Between 1999 and 2001, all activities were transferred to York and the college received the name "York St John College".

In February 2006, the College was granted the right to award degrees in its own name and the right to call itself a university college. On 10 July 2006, the Privy Council approved a request from the college to become a full-fledged university; the name became "York St John University" on 1 October 2006, and the first Chancellor (installed at a ceremony in York Minster on 7 March 2007) was the Archbishop of York John Sentamu. Archbishop Sentamu retired in 2019 after 12 years as Chancellor. He was succeeded by BBC broadcaster Reeta Chakrabarti.

== Campus ==
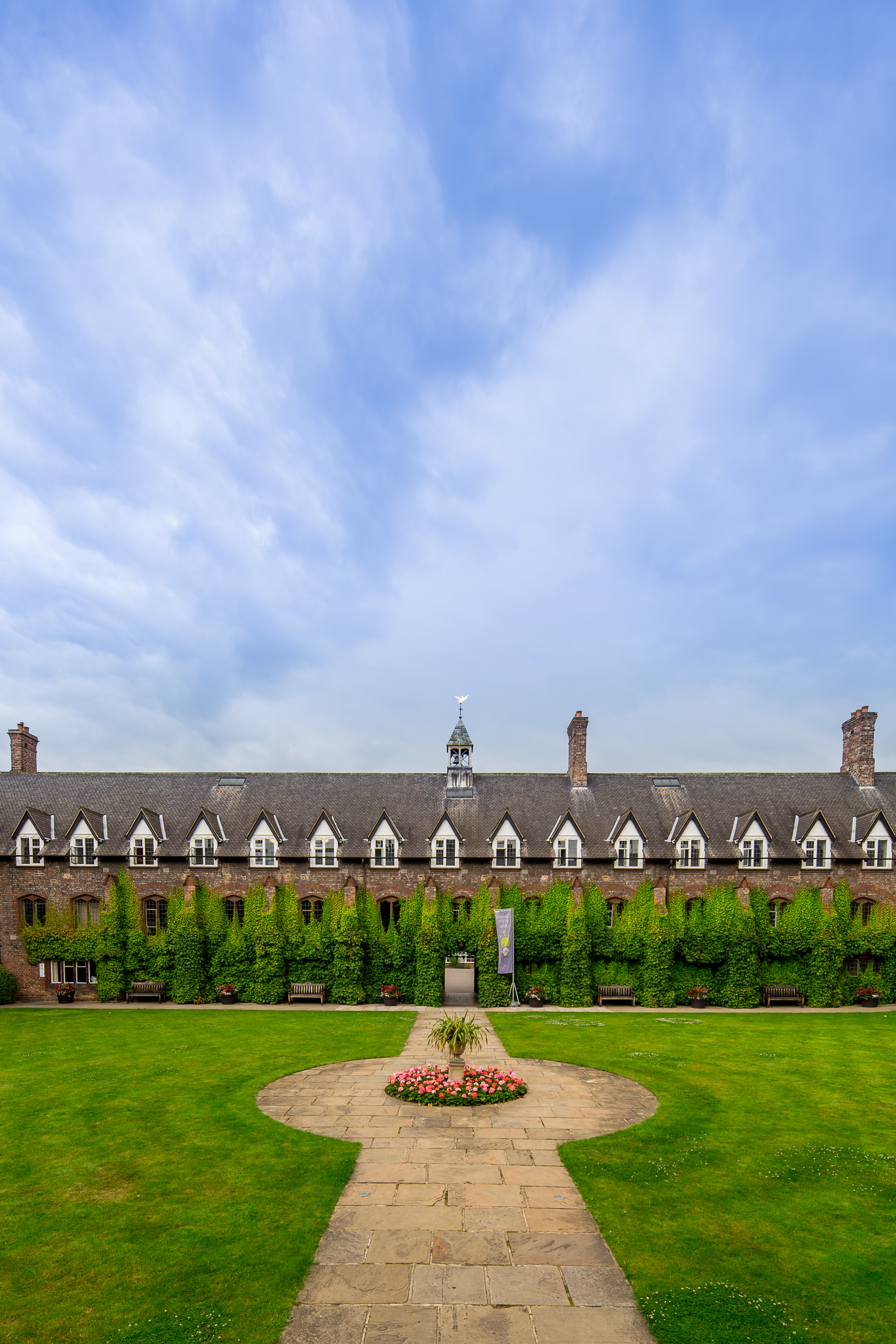
The Quad

The university has an eleven-acre city centre campus on Lord Mayor's Walk, close to York Minster and the city walls.

=== Creative Centre ===
Opened in 2021, the purpose-built Creative Centre spans three floors and provides teaching space for music, theatre, drama, creative writing and media production students. Part of the building is dedicated to computer science teaching and research. It includes high-tech equipment for software engineering and games development. The Creative Centre also includes a large auditorium for live performances.

=== Foss Building ===
In 2022 new spaces were developed in the existing Foss building to provide enhanced facilities for nu[NS1] [SC2] rsing, biomedical science, physiotherapy, occupational therapy, and paramedic science. The facilities include consultation rooms, specialist camera and audio systems, and simulation spaces.

=== York St John University Sports Park ===
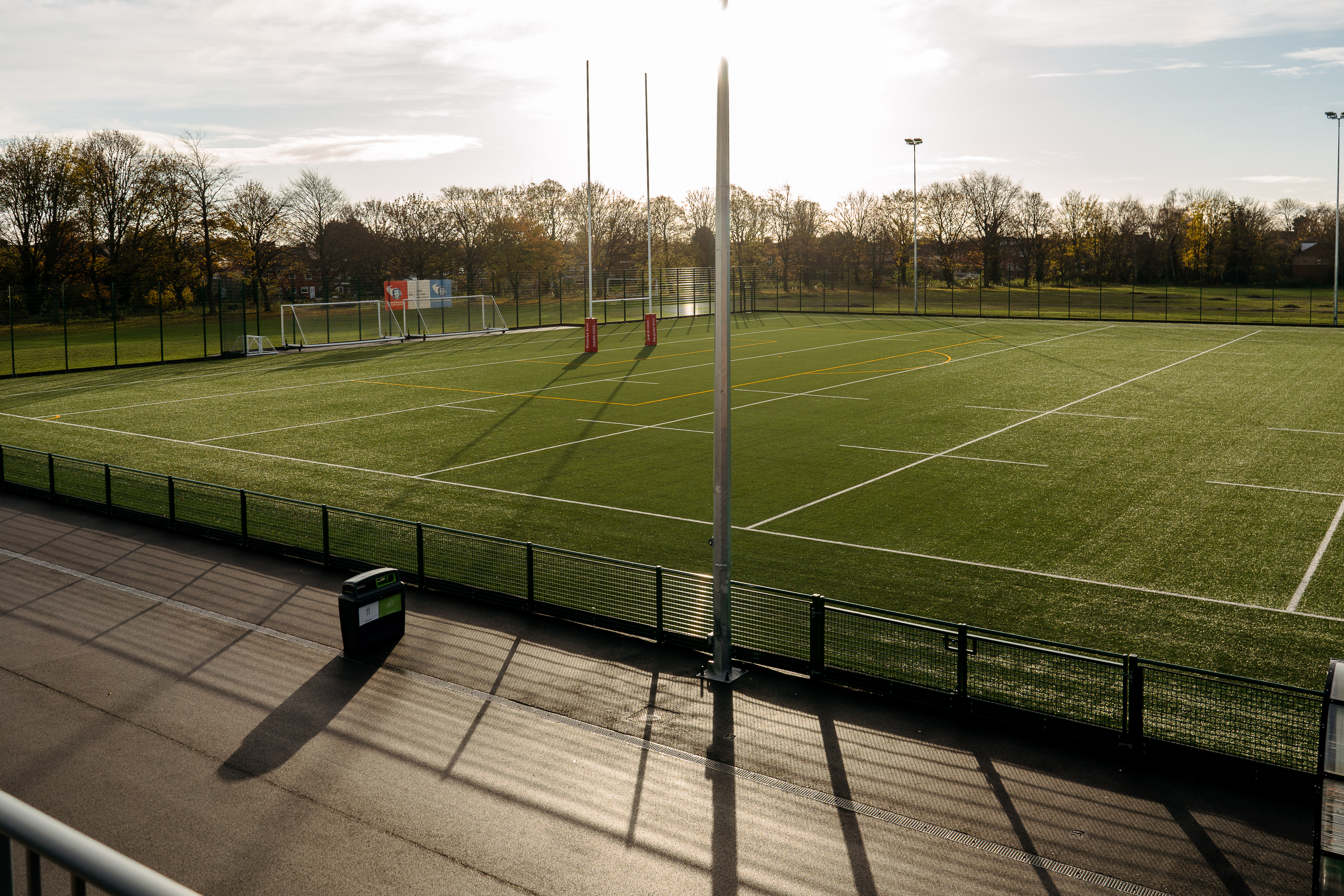
York St John University Sports Park

The university's main sports facilities are at the Sports Park on Haxby Road, one mile from the city centre. The university acquired the site in 2012. A multi-million-pound redevelopment included the creation of a 3G pitch for football and rugby league. The facilities at the site also include grass pitches, outdoor tennis courts, sprint track, sports barn and strength and conditioning suites.

In January 2021, three new indoor tennis courts were opened which are available for public use. The Sports Park is used as the training facilities for York Knights and as part of £1 million investment a 4G pitch matching the specifications of York Community Stadium was built. During the 2021 Rugby League World Cup the sports park hosted the Cook Islands women's team and was the venue for the warm-up match between the York Valkyrie and the Papua New Guinea Orchids on 20 October 2022.

=== Fountains Learning Centre ===
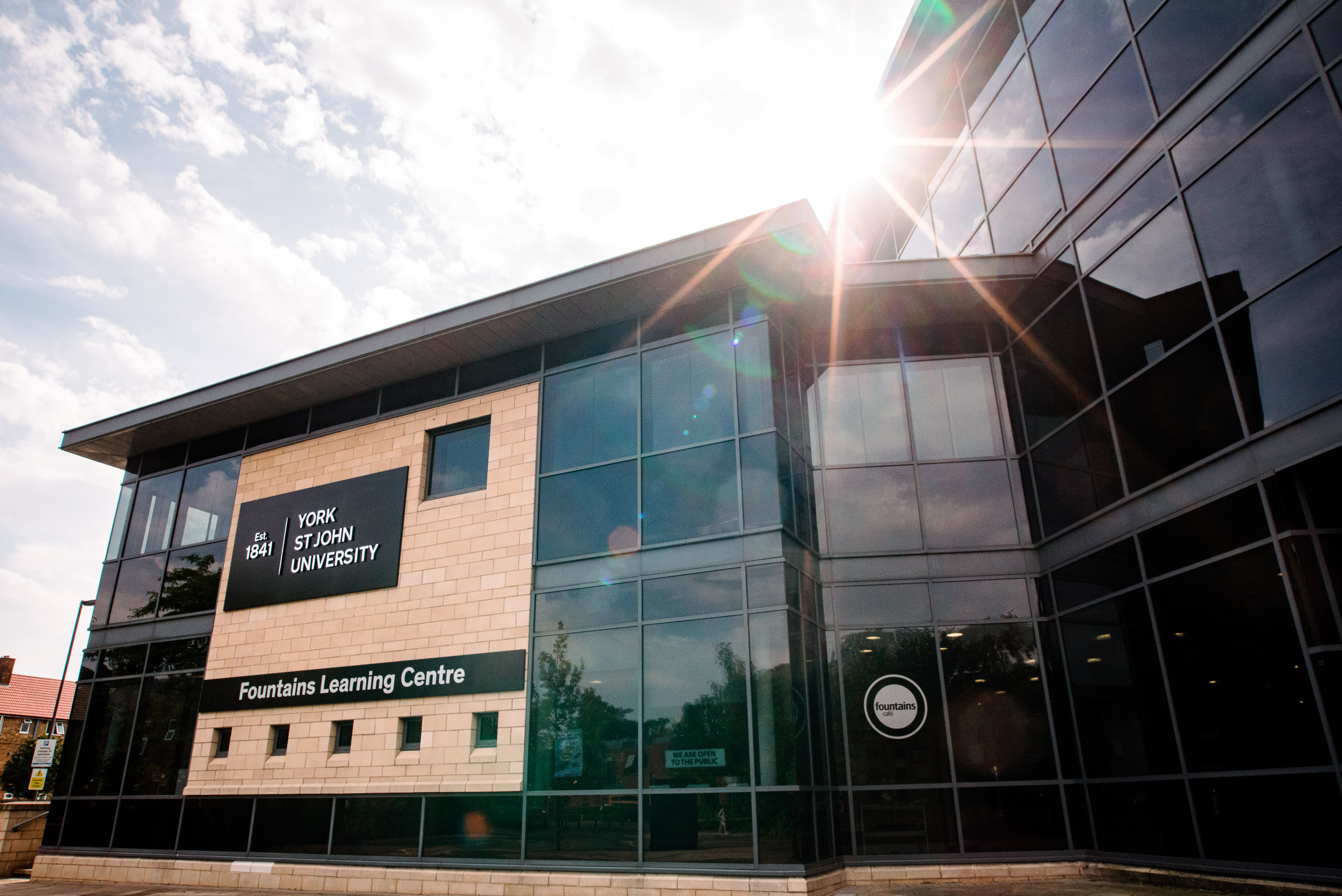
Fountains Learning Centre

The Fountains Learning Centre, opened in 2004, is at the Clarence Street entrance to the campus. It provides access to resources of all kinds including books, journals, DVDs and videos, media equipment, approximately 400 computers and a 200-seat lecture theatre.

=== De Grey Court ===
York St John University's £15.5 million De Grey Court was designed by leading architects Charles Thomson of Rivington Street Studio Architects in London. It has won many plaudits, including the highly lauded Lord Mayor's York Design Award and a Royal Institute of British Architects award.

The Porters Lodge

The Porters team are on duty at the following times: Monday to Friday: 7.00am to 6.30pm, Saturday and Sunday: closed. Porters are located in St Anthony's House (building code S.A.).

=== London campus ===
In 2018, York St John University's London campus opened, offering various postgraduate programmes in Business Management and Computer Science. The London campus is located near the East India DLR station.

== Academic profile ==
Rankings
National rankings
- Complete (2027): 105
- Guardian (2027): 115
- Times / Sunday Times (2027): 112

Global rankings
- THE (2026): 1001–1200

=== Courses ===
Around 100 degree course options are available to students at foundation and undergraduate level, including biomedical science, computer science, nursing, film and television production (see filmmaking), media production, physiotherapy, occupational therapy, literature, linguistics, Japanese, Korean, British Sign Language (BSL), psychology, counselling, business management, marketing, tourism, sociology, criminology, law, professional policing, video game design, history, creative writing, music, music production, art, design, geography, politics, theatre, dance, sport, theology and primary education.

At postgraduate level, subject areas offered at postgraduate level include business, MBA courses, creative writing, literature, publishing, occupational therapy, physiotherapy, psychology, theology, education, theatre, fine art, design, music production, film production, music, counselling, health, law, linguistics and TESOL.

=== Research ===
In recent years, York St John has developed its research capacity in Allied Health Professions & Studies; Psychology; Education; Sports-related Studies; English Language & Literature; Modern Languages and Linguistics; Theology and Religious Studies; and Drama, Dance & Performing Arts. Over 30% of research was ranked as world-leading and internationally excellent in the last Research Excellence Framework (REF) review.

=== Institute for Social Justice ===
The York St John University Institute for Social Justice was launched in 2020 to support the university's mission "to stand up for social justice". The Institute works with people, partners and communities to address the inequalities facing society today.

=== Reputation and rankings ===
York St John University was ranked 13th in the Times Higher Education Guide 2023.

York St John University rose to 84th in the Guardian University Guide in 2023. In the National Student Survey 2022, the university was ranked 30th of 122 English Higher Education providers for overall student satisfaction. York St John University is in the top 10 UK universities for giving equal access to students from all backgrounds.

=== Scholarships ===
The university has a newly developed set of scholarships for 2021 which include specific scholarships for: students from low income families, students who are from Black, Asian and minority ethnic backgrounds, students who are carers, students whose parents or guardians have died serving their country in the Armed Forces and students who are seeking asylum or with Limited Leave to Remain in the UK.

== Students' Union ==
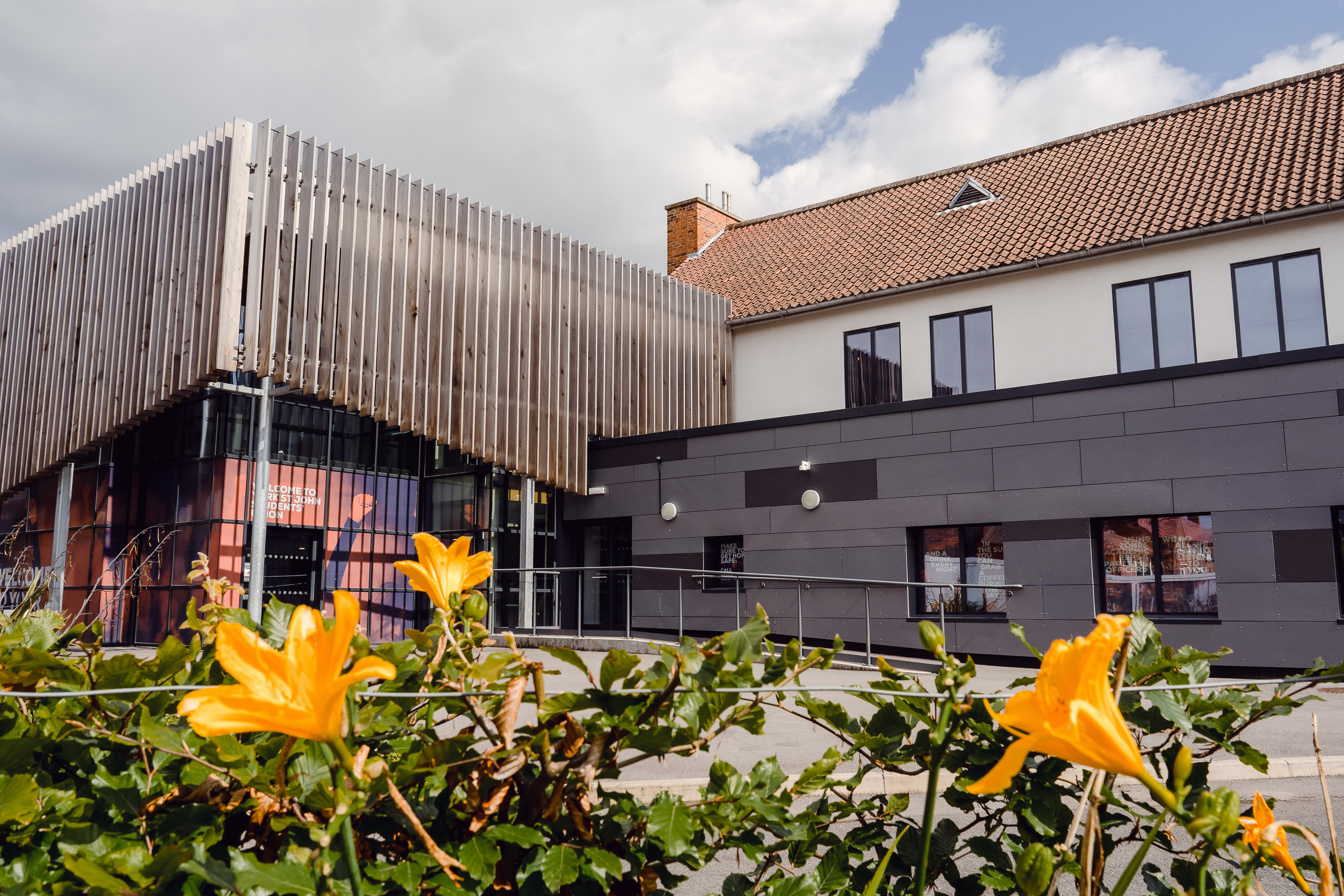
Students' Union

The YSJ Students' Union (YSJSU), is associated with nearly 50 clubs and societies, covering activities and interests such as sports, languages, music, drama, religion and art. The Students' Union is led by three full-time sabbatical officers: SU President, President of Education and President of Wellbeing and Diversity. There are also a number of part-time officers including chairs of schools and liberation officers. The Students' Union building houses space for students to socialise and create committees.

=== Community initiatives ===
In 2021, the Students' Union launched the "Throw it our way" community campaign. In partnership with Mind, Oxfam, RSPCA and the York Community Furniture Store, the campaign aimed to reduce waste being created when students moved out of their accommodation and redistribute items to those in need.

In April 2021, following the easing of some of the Covid-19 pandemic restrictions, the YSJSU launched the campaign "Reconnect the right way." The campaign aimed to normalise social anxiety, support local businesses and give advice on how to stay safe on nights out.

In 2005, the Students' Union launched another community-friendly campaign called 'Pick It Up'. This campaign was designed to reduce litter levels on campus and in the surrounding community.

In 2002, a campaign entitled "SSHH – Silent Students Happy Homes" was initiated to combat local residents' concerns about studentification. This has subsequently been adopted by other Students' Unions around the UK, although in many instances the expansion of the abbreviation has been dropped, leaving campaigns called "Shh", "Sshh", or variants.

=== Awards ===
In 2020, the Students' Union received a Silver Award from Investors in People.

In 2017, they attained an accreditation through "Quality Students' Unions" - a quality framework run by the National Union of Students.

In June 2014, the Students' Union was shortlisted for Small and Specialist Students' Union of the Year at the annual NUS Awards.

In 2012 the Students' Union was awarded silver in the Students' Union Evaluation Initiative, making it the only small Students' Union in the country to receive the award.

In October 2009, the Student Union was awarded a Bronze Students' Union Evaluation Initiative award, one of 16 institutions to receive this accolade. Awards are made from bronze (lowest) to gold (highest). The scheme is administered by a former manager of Sheffield University Student Union. Currently Sheffield University shares the gold award with the nearby Leeds University.

=== Sports ===
The Students' Union has many sports clubs.

York St John University Rowing Club was founded 11 years after the college in 1852 and caters for all levels of experience; from competent rowers to complete beginners.

As of academic year 2018–19, the biggest club is the dance club, which stands at 119 members, of which 18 compete at a national level. The club offers 10 types of classes (including ballet, jazz and street) to all its members and six to those on the competition team.

The football club plays at Heworth Green: one team competes under the name York St John University in the York Football League (they are currently in the Premier Division of that league system); their reserve team also feature in Reserve Division A, which is the top reserve league. Its origins date back to 1872 when J. Morton persuaded the Sports Association to take up association football.

The cricket club is probably the oldest club – the first record of cricket being played was in 1848, seven years after the opening of the Training College. The club has strong links with its Old Johns Cricket Association, whose president was ex-student Harry Gration.

The hockey club is one of the biggest clubs within the university, offering 1st and 2nd men's and ladies teams and a mixed team. The men's 1st team are the last ever BUSA National Plate champions, having won the competition in 2008.

The badminton club is also present and represents York St John in BUCS too.

As of 2019, students formed an esports society and teams formed in titles such as, Overwatch, League of Legends, and CSGO.

=== Societies ===
YSJSU houses around 30 different societies ranging from Musical Production, Drama, Geek Society, and course based societies too such as Physiotherapy, Geography, Primary Education and many more. The societies work together on many projects in the year and all have the opportunity to win the title of Society of year at the annual Societies Awards Dinner.

=== Democratic structures ===
As of September 2016, the Students' Union moved to a new democratic structure in order to further student engagement with the Union. The Students' Union is led by a student executive of twelve, including three full-time officer trustees and nine chairs of schools representing each of the university schools. The current president of York St John Students' Union is Tim Holmes. The current president of education is Jenny Marchant. The current president of wellbeing and diversity is Kirsten Jolley.

The executive all hold seats on the Student Council (previously Senate) and the other seats are filled by elected members of each of the six Students' Union 'Zones' (student forums).

Any student can submit a motion to the Student Council on any issue regarding life at university. The motion is then debated by members of Senate and either passed or not passed as policy.

== Community links ==
=== York St John Communities Centre ===
Founded in 2016 and based on the university campus, the Communities Centre offers counselling, support groups and drop-in sessions for local residents. It also conducts research into mental health issues. Specialist areas are bereavement and domestic abuse. The Centre regularly collaborates with the Independent Domestic Abuse Services (IDAS).

Converge

Converge provides courses for adults who use mental health services in the York area. Their courses include visual arts, creative writing, music, theatre, and study skills. They are taught by staff, students and people with experience of mental ill health.

== Notable alumni ==
- Alasdair Beckett-King, stand-up comedian
- Paul Blomfield, Labour Member of Parliament for Sheffield Central
- Geoff Cooke, former England Rugby International Manager
- Tom Danby, double Rugby Union and Rugby League International
- Peter Davies, Professor of Economic History and maritime historian
- Julia Davis, comedy writer and actress best known for writing and starring in the BBC Three sitcom Nighty Night and for her role as Dawn Sutcliffe in popular BBC comedy Gavin & Stacey.
- Eileen Fenton, first woman to swim the English Channel
- Harry Gration, television presenter, best known as one of the main presenters for the BBC Yorkshire regional magazine programme Look North
- Alistair Griffin, singer/songwriter who first came to the public's attention on the 2003 BBC television series Fame Academy 2
- Bella Hardy, folk singer
- Jack Harrison, (1917), recipient of the Victoria Cross and Rugby League player
- Edward Jarvis, author and theologian
- Matt Messias, ex professional football referee
- Scarlett Moffatt, television personality, famous for Gogglebox, I'm a Celebrity...Get Me Out of Here! and Beauty School Cop Outs
- Peter D. Robinson, presiding Bishop of the United Episcopal Church of North America and Bishop of the Missionary Diocese of the East
- Tim Smith, BBC Radio 2 presenter
- Peter Squires, former England Rugby Union international
- L. P. Wenham Archaeologist and excavator of Roman York
- Tom Wilkinson, former professional footballer

== See also ==
- Abi Curtis (poet, writer, and lecturer at York St John University)
- Armorial of UK universities
- List of universities in the UK
- Listed buildings in York (outside the city walls, northern part)
- College of Education
- Reeta Chakrabarti (York St John University, chancellor)
- University of York
- York College
