= Timeline of York =

Coordinates: 53.958333°N 1.080278°W

The following is a timeline of the history of the city of York, North Yorkshire in northern England.

== 1st-4th centuries ==
- 71 – Quintus Petillius Cerialis and the Roman Legio VIIII Hispana establish a fort (castra) above the River Ouse near its junction with the Foss. City walls probably begun; enlarged until 3rd century.
- 95–104 – Period of first recorded reference to the city as Eboracum.
- 107-108 – Last dateable reference to the presence of Legio VIIII Hispana at Eboracum.
- 119 – Legio VI Victrix arrive in Eboracum.
- 122 – Emperor Hadrian may have visited the city during his visit to the province.
- 190–212 – Period during which Claudius Hieronymianus is legatus of Legio VI Victrix based in Eboracum and establishes a temple to Serapis here.
- 208–211 – Septimius Severus and the Imperial family at Eboracum. Severus campaigns in the Roman invasion of Caledonia, but the city is used to overwinter.
- 211 – 4 February: Roman emperor Septimius Severus dies at Eboracum.
- c. 214 – Eboracum becomes the administrative centre of Britannia Inferior.
- 306 – 25 July: Constantine the Great is acclaimed as Roman emperor by the troops in Eboracum on the death here of his father Constantius Chlorus.
- 383 – Last substantial Roman presence in the north of England.

== 5th-10th centuries ==
- 625 – 21 July?: Paulinus is consecrated as first Bishop of York.
- 627 – Paulinus establishes the first (temporary wooden) York Minster for the baptism of King Edwin of Northumbria; and also St Peter's School.
- 637 – Stone-built predecessor of York Minster dedicated to St Peter completed.
- 735 – Bishop Ecgbert is elevated to become first Archbishop of York. He establishes a library and school.
- 741 – Minster destroyed by fire; subsequently rebuilt on a larger scale.
- 866 – November: The "Great Heathen Army" of Vikings led by Ivar the Boneless capture York.
- 867 – 21 March: Danes defeat a Northumbrian counterattack against York, killing their kings Osberht and Ælla and installing a puppet ruler, Ecgberht.
- 876 – Danes capture southern Northumbria and found the Kingdom of York perhaps under Halfdan Ragnarsson.
- c. 897 – Mint re-established in the city.
- c. 919 – The Norse–Gael leader Ragnall ua Ímair captures York.
- 927 – Æthelstan, King of the Anglo-Saxons, expels Gofraid ua Ímair from York.
- 939 – The Norse-Gael King of Dublin Olaf III Guthfrithsson captures York.
- 944 – King Edmund I of England takes York from the Vikings.
- 947 – Eric Bloodaxe becomes king of Northumbria for the first time at the invitation of Wulfstan I, Archbishop of York.
- 954 – Eric Bloodaxe is deposed and subsequently killed.

== 11th–14th centuries ==
- 1055 - Siward, Earl of Northumbria dies and is buried in St Olave's Church.
- 1065 – 3 October: Northumbrian rebels capture York, outlaw Harold Godwinson's brother Tostig and choose Morcar of Northumbria as their new earl.
- 1066 – 20 September: Battle of Fulford – Northern Anglo-Saxon Earls Edwin and Morcar are defeated by the Viking invader Harald Hardrada just south of York.
- 1068 – Morcar leads a revolt in Northumbria, but William the Conqueror defeats the rebels at York and builds a wooden motte-and-bailey castle probably on the later site of York Castle.
- 1069 – c. 28 January: Northumbrian rebels attack York.
- Winter of 1069–1070 – Harrying of the North: William quells rebellions in the North of England brutally and builds a second motte-and-bailey castle, probably that on Baile Hill.
- 1070 – 23 May: The first Norman Archbishop, Thomas of Bayeux, is appointed and begins rebuilding of York Minster.
- 1088 – January/February: St Mary's Abbey re-established.
- 1126 – Archbishoprics of Canterbury and of York declared equal.
- 1137 – 4 June: York Minster and city are severely damaged by a fire, but the Minster is soon rebuilt; St Peter's Hospital is replaced by St Leonard's.
- 1154 – Ouse Bridge collapses under the weight of a crowd gathered to greet Archbishop William of York on his return from exile. On 8 June William dies, apparently poisoned at Mass.
- 1182 – Charter granted to citizens.
- 1190 – 16 March: A mob besieges 150 Jews (including their leader Josce) in Clifford's Tower of York Castle, allowing to be killed by fire those who do not commit suicide.
- 1212 – 9 July: Royal charter granted allowing citizens to collect their own taxes and appoint a mayor (first known 1217).
- 1220 – Re-building of York Minster in Gothic style begins under Archbishop Walter de Gray (dies 1255), starting with the south transept (completed about 1240).
- 1228 – Christmas: During a visit by King Henry III, a gale destroys the wooden keep at York Castle.
- 1237 – 25 September: Treaty of York signed between Henry III of England and his brother-in-law Alexander II of Scotland.
- 1244 – Henry III orders rebuilding of the castle in stone, work which is completed about 1272.
- c. 1260 – In York Minster
  - Construction of the north transept is completed and the Five Sisters window (in grisaille) installed.
  - Construction of the octagonal chapter house in the Decorated style (completed by 1296) begins.
- 1291 – Construction of the nave of York Minster begins.
- 1295 - The city returns two members to parliament.
- 1298–1304 – King Edward houses the national Exchequer (at the castle) and Chancery (at the abbey) in York.
- 1316 – Lady Row built in Goodramgate.
- 1319 – 20 September: First War of Scottish Independence: Scottish victory at the Battle of Myton over defenders from York. Many priests and the mayor of York are killed.
- 1322 – Great Raid of 1322 plagues the north of England with a Scottish victory at the Battle of Old Byland nearby. Suburbs of York are raided.
- 1328 – King Edward marries Philippa of Hainault in the Minster. A tournament is held in their honour.
- 1335 – Parliament meets in York; subsequently it will normally meet at Westminster (London).
- 1337 – c. 8 July: Death of William of Hatfield, second son of Edward III and Queen Philippa, at only a few months old; he is buried in the Minster.
- 1344 – Mint established at the castle.
- 1349 – May: Black Death reaches York. 50% of the population die.
- 1350s – Construction of the nave of York Minster completed. The great west window becomes known as the "Heart of Yorkshire".
- 1357 – Merchant Adventurers' Hall construction begins.
- 1361 – Construction of the lady chapel, presbytery and choir of York Minster in Perpendicular style begun, by Archbishop John of Thoresby.
- 1376 – Corpus Christi (feast): Earliest record of York Mystery Plays, although they probably originate from the 1340s.
- 1381 – Summer: Peasants’ Revolt. Unrest in York lasts for a year.
- 1389 – Office of mayor raised to Lord Mayor of York, second in precedence only to the Lord Mayor of London.
- 1396 – King Richard II grants a charter to the city making it a county corporate.

== 15th–16th centuries ==
- c. 1400 – Lantern tower of All Saints’ Church, Pavement, built.
- 1405 – 8 June: Following the collapse of a revolt in the north begun in April by the House of Percy in which they participated and trial by a special commission, Richard Scrope, Archbishop of York, and others are beheaded at York.
- 1407 – York Minster’s central tower collapses due to poor foundations; it is rebuilt from 1420 in Perpendicular style.
- 1408 – York Minster east window, the world's largest expanse of medieval glass (begun c. 1405), is completed by glass painter John Thornton of Coventry.
- 1434 – Mulberry Hall built.
- c. 1450 – Choir of York Minster completed.
- 1453 – York Guildhall opens.
- 1460 – St William's College founded.
- 1464 – 1 June: Treaty of York signed between England and Scotland.
- 1471 – 14 March: Wars of the Roses: The deposed Edward IV of England lands with a small force at Ravenspur, moving on speedily to secure York.
- 1472 – York Minster consecrated following completion of its west towers.
- 1476 – 13 March: Richard of Gloucester addresses civic officials within Bootham Bar proclaiming he is present to keep his brother the king's peace.
- 1483 – 8 September: The infant Edward of Middleham is invested as Prince of Wales by his father the new king Richard III of England at the Archbishop's Palace.
- 1486 & 1487 – King Henry VII visits.
- c. 1500 – Rose window installed in York Minster commemorating the end of the Wars of the Roses in 1487.
- 1525–36 – New church of St Michael le Belfrey built (John Forman, master mason).
- 1536 – 10 October: Leadership of the Pilgrimage of Grace (northern rebels against the English Reformation) is assumed by Robert Aske, a Catholic London barrister of Yorkshire family. 9,000 strong, they march to York.
- 1538 – Dissolution of the Monasteries: York Franciscan Friary dissolved.
- 1539 – Dissolution of the Monasteries: St Mary's Abbey and the adjacent St Leonard's Hospital are dissolved. King's Manor becomes the headquarter of the Council of the North.
- 1541 – King Henry VIII visits.
- 1569 – York Mystery Plays suppressed.
- 1586 – 25 March: Margaret Clitherow martyred by peine forte et dure for refusing to plead to a charge of harbouring Catholic priests.
- 1596 – 29 November: George Errington, William Gibson and William Knight martyred by hanging, drawing and quartering for professing their Catholic faith.

== 17th century ==
- 1616 – June: First waterworks and piped water supply.
- 1617 – King James I visits.
- 1633 – King Charles I visits.
- 1642 – 19 March–3 July: Charles I holds court at York. The Great Seal of the Realm is sent to him here on 17 May.
- 1644
  - 16 July: First English Civil War: Parliamentary forces capture York; Thomas Fairfax prevents damage to the Minster and churches.
  - Ye Olde Starre Inne licensed.
- 1653 – 18 April: London–York stagecoach first recorded.
- 1673 – 18 April: Viscount Fairfax throws a party to mark his remodelling of Fairfax House.
- 1674 – Friargate Quaker Meeting House first built.
- 1676 – Highwayman John Nevison rides from Kent to York in a day to establish an alibi. On 4 May 1684 he will be hanged on the Knavesmire for another offence.
- 1677 – York Waterworks re-established.
- 1679 – 7 August: Nicholas Postgate is hanged, drawn and quartered on the Knavesmire for being a Roman Catholic priest.
- 1684 – 23 April: A gunpowder explosion guts Clifford's Tower at York Castle, leading to the city being abandoned as a military garrison.
- 1686 – 5 November: Bar Convent established, making it the oldest surviving active Catholic convent in England.
- 1694 – First corporation fire engine purchased.
- 1695 – Grays, solicitors, established.

== 18th century ==
- 1705
  - Debtor's Prison completed at York Castle.
  - Blue Coat School, York & The Grey Coat School founded.
- 1709 – Earliest record of horse racing on Clifton Ings.
- 1719 – 23 February: Publication of the city's first newspaper, the York Mercury, by Grace White.
- 1726 – Judges' Lodgings completed as a townhouse for physician Clifton Wintringham senior.
- 1730 – New Walk laid out.
- c. 1731 – First horse races at York Racecourse on the Knavesmire.
- 1732
  - August: York Assembly Rooms (designed in Palladian style by Richard Boyle, 3rd Earl of Burlington) opened.
  - Mansion House (begun 1725) completed as an official residence for the Lord Mayor.
- 1739 – 7 April: Essex highwayman and murderer Dick Turpin hanged at the "York Tyburn" on the Knavesmire for horse stealing following imprisonment in York Castle and trial at York Assizes there.
- 1740 – April: York County Hospital established.
- 1744 – New Theatre opened.
- 1759 – December: Laurence Sterne has the first two volumes of his comic metafictional novel The Life and Opinions of Tristram Shandy, Gentleman printed at York in the shop owned by Ann Ward.
- 1767 – Establishment of the confectionery business which would later become Terry's.
- 1769 – 8 April: The Theatre Royal reopens under this title having been granted a Royal Patent under its manager Tate Wilkinson.
- 1770 – Holgate Windmill built.
- 1774 – Inclosure act for Acomb and Holgate, the Acomb and Holgate Inclosure Act 1774 (14 Geo. 3. c. 81 Pr.)
- 1777
  - In the courtyard of York Castle
    - Assize Courts (designed by John Carr) are completed.
    - The central circle is grassed in as the "Eye of the Ridings".
  - The County Lunatic Asylum (designed by John Carr), origin of Bootham Park Hospital, is completed.
- 1778 – Clock at church of St Martin Coney Street erected.
- 1780–1785 – New Female Prison (designed by John Carr) built at York Castle.
- 1783 – May: John Goodricke presents his conclusions that the variable star Algol is what comes to be known as an eclipsing binary to the Royal Society of London.
- 1784 – 19 October: John Goodricke begins his observations of the variable star Delta Cephei.
- 1788 – Public dispensary for the poor opened at Merchant Adventurers' Hall.
- 1794 – April: Foss Navigation Company begins improvement of the River Foss. Monk Bridge built (designed by Peter Atkinson).
- 1796 – The Retreat established by the Quaker William Tuke, pioneering the humane treatment of people with mental disorders.

== 19th century ==
- 1803–1842 – Manchester Academy is relocated to York in order to have the Unitarian Charles Wellbeloved as its head.
- 1811 – Quaker William Alexander opens a book and stationery shop in Castlegate, later taken over by the Sessions family of printers.
- 1812 – New stone Foss Bridge (designed by Peter Atkinson) completed.
- c. 1815 – George Hudson moves to York.
- 1821 – New Ouse Bridge (designed by Peter Atkinson) completed.
- 1822 – Joseph Rowntree opens a grocery shop, origin of the Rowntree's chocolate business.
- 1823
  - September: Music festival held in the Cathedral.
  - York Gas Light Company incorporated, opening its works at Layerthorpe by March 1824.
- 1824 – 1 September: Yorkshire Fire & Life Insurance Company opens for business.
- 1825 – Mary Tuke opens the Tuke family grocery shop, origin of the Rowntree's cocoa business.
- 1827 – Yorkshire Philosophical Society begins excavation of St Mary's Abbey, prior to construction of the Yorkshire Museum on part of the site.
- 1829 – 1–2 February: York Minster choir and nave roof are extensively damaged in a fire started by religious fanatic Jonathan Martin (who is subsequently acquitted of arson on the grounds of insanity).
- 1830 – February: Yorkshire Museum (designed in the Greek Revival style by William Wilkins) opened by Yorkshire Philosophical Society in the grounds of St Mary's Abbey.
- 1832 – 2 June: 1829–51 cholera pandemic spreads to York.
- 1833–36 – St Leonard's Place built.
- 1836
  - First unified police force established.
  - York Public Cemetery Company founded.
  - First large bathhouse in the city built at the bottom of Marygate.
- 1837 – Walker Iron Foundry established.
- 1839 – 29 May: York & North Midland Railway opens the city's first railway station.
- 1840
  - 11 May: Chartist leader Feargus O'Connor is sentenced to imprisonment in York Castle for seditious libel over speeches published in The Northern Star.
  - 20 May: York Minster's nave roof is destroyed in an accidental fire. Mishandling of the repair arrangements leads in 1841 to Dean of York William Cockburn being charged with simony, although he is subsequently acquitted.
  - 17 July: Wesleyan Centenary Chapel is opened.
- 1842 – First railway works constructed.
- 1844 – York Gas Light Company and York Union Gas Light Company amalgamated.
- 1845 – York Penitentiary Society formed to provide a refuge for reformed prostitutes.
- 1846 – York New Waterworks Company formed.
- 1851–52 – Walker Iron Foundry supply forecourt railings for the British Museum in London.
- 1853 – York Drainage and Sanitary Improvement Act 1853 provides for the city corporation to purchase the River Foss and improve drainage.
- 1862 – Quaker Henry Isaac Rowntree buys out the chocolate and cocoa departments of the Tuke family confectioners, origin of the Rowntree's business.
- 1863 – 8 January: Lendal Bridge (designed by Thomas Page) opened.
- 1868
  - York F.C. (subsequently Ryedale-York, York Wasps, York City Knights, and York RLFC) is formed as a rugby football club.
  - 31 October: New Corn Exchange opens for business.
- 1877 – 25 June: North Eastern Railway opens new (modern-day) York railway station.
- 1880
  - 27 October: York Tramways Company inaugurates its first horse-drawn tram service.
  - Burgins perfumiers established.
  - The Foss Islands branch line opens
- 1881 – 10 March: Skeldergate Bridge opened.
- 1882
  - York Art Gallery opened.
  - The Evening Press begins publication.
- 1884 – North Eastern Railway begins production at York Carriage Works. Holgate is incorporated into the city.
- 1888 - County borough was created.
- 1890 – Browns department store established.
- 1894 – August: Lendal Bridge freed of toll.
- 1895 – Major sewerage scheme opened.
- 1899 – Seebohm Rowntree undertakes his first York study of poverty.

== 20th century ==
- 1900 – Corporation opens electricity generating works at Layerthorpe resulting in the opening of Foss Island Power Station.
- 1901
  - Seebohm Rowntree publishes Poverty, A Study of Town Life based on a sociological survey of York.
  - Population: 77,914.
- 1902–1904 – Construction of the model village of New Earswick.
- 1906 – 24 November: North Eastern Railway opens new headquarters offices.
- 1908
  - 23 November: New Picture Palace, the former Wesleyan Methodist New Street Hall, opened as the city's first permanent cinema.
  - York City F.C. founded as an amateur Association football club.
- 1910 – 20 January: York Corporation Tramways inaugurates an electric service.
- 1911
  - 13 July: A strike by millers leads to rioting.
  - Electric Cinema, Fossgate, opened, the city's first purpose-built cinema.
- c.1912 – Piccadilly laid out.
- 1914 – 1 April: Skeldergate Bridge freed of toll.
- 1916 – 2 May: Zeppelin raid on York kills 9.
- 1922
  - 6 May: York City F.C. re-founded.
  - The London & North Eastern Railway begins to set up a private museum around the station area, origin of the National Railway Museum.
- 1926
  - Terry's open The Chocolate Works.
  - York sugar beet factory opens.
- 1935 – 16 November: York Corporation Tramways closed and replaced by motor bus services.
- 1937
  - September: Regal Cinema opens; Odeon, Blossom Street, also opens this year.
  - Acomb is incorporated into the city.
  - The sugar-coated chocolate sweets Smarties are first marketed under this name by Rowntree's.
- 1938 – 23 April: York Castle Museum opened.
- 1942
  - 28/29 April: Baedeker Blitz: Air raid kills 79, guts York Guildhall, the church of St Martin Coney Street and the railway locomotive shed.
  - October: RAF Elvington reopened as a hard-runway bomber airfield.
- 1948 – York: A Plan for Progress and Preservation published.
- 1951 – First York Festival, including a major revival of the York Mystery Plays.
- 1956 – Castle Mills Bridge opened.
- 1961 – 16 December: York Cold War Bunker opened.
- 1962 – 11 April: York Crematorium dedicated.
- 1963
  - University of York established with a new campus at Heslington.
  - 28 October – Clifton Bridge is opened.
- 1967–1972 – York Minster foundations strengthened.
- 1968 – Viscount Esher publishes York: a study in conservation.
- 1969 – Rowntree's merged with Mackintosh's.
- 1970 – 25 October: Margaret Clitherow canonised as St Margaret of York.
- 1971
  - Stonegate pedestrianised.
  - York becomes an Army Saluting Station.
- 1973 – First regular ghost walk.
- 1975 – 27 September: The National Railway Museum is opened, the first national museum outside London.
- 1976–79 – York Archaeological Trust begins an excavation at a former sweet factory on the site of Scandinavian York (Jórvík) prior to construction of Coppergate Shopping Centre here.
- 1976
  - New York Hospital opens, replacing a number of smaller facilities.
  - A64 York bypass road opens.
  - 25 October: Foss Island Power Station closes.
- 1982 – 31 May: Pope John Paul II visits the city as part of his visit to the United Kingdom; 200,000 people gather at York Racecourse on the Knavesmire for a liturgy.
- 1983 – 4 July: BBC Radio York begins permanent broadcasting.
- 1984
  - April: Opening of Coppergate Shopping Centre and Jorvik Viking Centre.
  - 9 July: A fire in the south transept roof of York Minster, probably caused by an electrical storm, causes extensive damage.
- 1987 – 11 December: The York Outer Ring Road is completed.
- 1988
  - November: River Foss Barrier completed.
  - Rowntree Mackintosh Confectionery taken over by Nestlé.
- 1989
  - The Foss Islands branch line closes.
  - The York Barbican opens.
- 1992 – 4 July: Minster FM begins broadcasting.
- 1993 – Terry's taken over by Kraft Foods Inc.
- 1996 – The City of York becomes a unitary authority area which includes rural areas beyond the old city boundaries.
- 1997 – Last commercial traffic on the River Foss (newsprint from Goole for the Yorkshire Evening Press).
- 1998 – Monks Cross and McArthur Glen shopping centres and University science park open.

== 21st century ==
- 2000 – October–November – Severe flooding, chiefly from River Ouse.
- 2001 – 10 April: Millennium Bridge opens.
- 2007 – York sugar beet factory closes.
- 2011 – The York Barbican reopens after several years of closure.
- 2014
  - 6 July: York hosts the start of Tour de France, Stage 2.
  - Vangarde Shopping Park opens.
- 2015
  - Easter: York Army Museum opens.
  - December: Severe flooding, chiefly from the River Foss.
- 2020 – 30 January: COVID-19 in the UK: The first two known cases of infection with SARS-CoV-2 (at this time known as 2019-nCoV) in the United Kingdom, two Chinese nationals staying in York, are confirmed.
- 2021 – 16 February: York City F.C. play the opening match at York Community Stadium at Monks Cross.
- 2023 – 3 August: Appointment of first rabbi to a Jewish congregation in York since 1190 is announced.

== Births ==
- c. 735 – Alcuin, scholar (died 804 in Tours)
- Before 1190 – Aaron of York, financier and chief rabbi of England (died after 1253)
- 1556 – Margaret Clitherow, Catholic saint (martyred 1586)
- 1564 – 20 March: Thomas Morton, bishop of Durham (died 1659)
- 1570 – 13 April: Guy Fawkes, Catholic conspirator (executed 1606)
- 1586 – 5 April: Christopher Levett, sea captain and New England settler (died 1630 at sea)
- c. 1612 – John Hingston, organist and composer (died 1683)
- 1624 – Matthew Poole, Nonconformist theologian (died 1679 in Amsterdam)
- 1647 – Francis Place, gentleman draughtsman (died 1728)
- 1755 – 6 July: John Flaxman, sculptor (died 1826)
- 1784 – 31 July: Samuel Tuke, philanthropist and mental health reformer (died 1857)
- 1787 – 10 March: William Etty, painter of nudes (died 1849)
- 1799 – May: George Hennet, railway contractor (died 1857)
- 1800 – 17 June: William Parsons, 3rd Earl of Rosse, astronomer (died 1867 in Ireland)
- 1803 – 26 October: Joseph Hansom, architect and patentee of the Hansom cab (died 1882)
- 1809 – Mary Ellen Best, domestic watercolourist (died 1891 in Darmstadt)
- 1813 – 15 March: John Snow, physician, epidemiologist and pioneer of anaesthesia (died 1858 in London)
- 1836 – 24 May: Joseph Rowntree, chocolate manufacturer and philanthropist (died 1925)
- 1841 – 4 September: Albert Joseph Moore, figure painter (died 1893)
- 1851 – 19 June: Silvanus P. Thompson, physicist, pioneer of calculus and electricity (died 1916)
- 1871 – 7 July: Seebohm Rowntree, chocolate manufacturer and social reformer (died 1954)
- 1881 – 20 September: Will Ashton (Sir John Ashton), landscape painter and gallery director (died 1963 in Australia)
- 1907 – 21 February: W. H. Auden, poet (died 1973 in Austria)
- 1912 – 6 February: Christopher Hill, Marxist historian (died 2003)
- 1917 – 6 March: Frankie Howerd, comic actor (died 1992)
- 1933 – 3 November: John Barry, film composer (died 2011 in the United States)
- 1934 – 9 December: Judi Dench, actress
- 1942
  - 17 April: David Bradley, actor
  - 23 June: Martin Rees, astrophysicist
- 1943 – 9 May: Vince Cable, politician
- 1992 – 2 October: Lucy Staniforth, footballer

== See also ==
- History of York
- Timelines of other cities in Yorkshire and the Humber: Bradford, Hull, Sheffield
