= Thomas Gare =

Member of the England Parliament for York
- In office 1420–1421
- Preceded by: Thomas Santon; John Blackburn
- Succeeded by: John Penrith; Henry Preston
- In office 1421 (December) – 1422
- Preceded by: William Bowes; Richard Russell

Personal details
- Born: York
- Spouse: Katherine
- Children: 2 sons (Thomas +1), 2 daughters (Alice +1)
- Parent: William Gare (Father)
- Profession: Merchant

Thomas Gare was one of two Members of the Parliament of England for the constituency of York on two occasions.

== Life and politics ==
Thomas was born to William Gare, a local York mercer. He had a brother John and both were given the freedom of the city in 1385. He held several offices in the city that included bailiff (1393–94), member of the council of 23 (1415–17), member of the council of 12 (1419 onwards) and lord mayor (1420–21) He served as MP for York on two occasions (1419 & Dec 1421).

His wealth came from trade and the earliest record of his business was as part of a consortium of York and Hull merchants trading wool to Middleburg in the Netherlands in 1388. He also traded in cloth made mostly by his own workforce. His business spread as far as Newcastle upon Tyne. He was also opportunistic in some of his trade deals. At times he also sold herring wine, woad, Spanish Iron and coal. He helped found the York Guild of Corpus Christi in 1408

With his wealth, he was able to invest in property. He had holdings in Nether Ousegate, Coney Street and Upper Ousegate in York. At one point he even had property in Calais. On 9 June 1436, he acquired lands at Newland near Easington in Northumberland.

He was also generous with donations, notably to the Austin Friars of York to build a dormitory.

Political offices
| Preceded by Thomas Santon; John Blackburn | Member of Parliament; 1420 | Next: John Penrith; Henry Preston |
| Preceded by John Penrith; Henry Preston | Member of Parliament; 1421 (December) | Next: William Bowes; Richard Russell |
