= Santon =

Santon may refer to the following people:

- Davide Santon, Italian footballer
- Thomas Santon, Member of Parliament for the City of York in May 1413 and 1417

Santon may also refer to he following places:

- Santon, Isle of Man, a village and a parish in the Isle of Man
- Santon, Lincolnshire, a small hamlet in North Lincolnshire, England, close to Scunthorpe
- Santon, Norfolk, a village in Norfolk, England
- Santon Bridge, a small village in Copeland, Cumbria
- Santon Downham, a village in West Suffolk, England

Santon may also refer to:

- Santon (figurine), a small figurine cast in terracotta or a similar material
- Santon (Transformers), a fictional Beast Wars character
- HMNZS Santon (M1178), a minesweeper of the Royal New Zealand Navy

== See also ==
- Wali, Muslim holy man or saint, sometimes called "santon" in English
