= John Northby =

Member of the England Parliament for York
- In office 1414 (November) – 1415
- Succeeded by: John Morton; Richard Russell
- In office 1419–1419
- Preceded by: Thomas Santon; John Blackburn

Personal details
- Born: York
- Profession: Merchant
- =

John Northby was one of two Members of the Parliament of England for the constituency of York on two occasions.

== Life and politics ==
John was the son of Margaret Northby, his father and his date of birth being unknown. He is known to have been a close associate of the wealthy York merchant, William Vescy, and married his twice widowed daughter, Emma in 1407. One of Emma's previous husband's had been York MP, Robert Savage. His father-in-law left him a substantial bequest in his will that he used to buy property. His marriage enabled him to have a head start in making connections with other city merchants. His first wife died in 1415 and he was left with other property left to her from her second husband's estate. He acquired tenements in Clementhorpe and meadowland in Middlethorpe by 1416. He later acquired land in Stockton-on-the-Moram and Skeldergate. He remarried to another Emma and had two sons and one daughter.

Not much is known of her merchant business other than he belonged to the Calais Staple. It is recorded that he also lost two shipments of wool to bad weather and pirates. In his will he left £266 to his children and £40 to Emma Kirby, a servant. He was buried in the Church of St Mary Veteris.

John was given the freedom of the city in 1402 and held the offices of chamberlain (1408–09), sheriff (1409–10) and Lord Mayor (1416–17). He was MP for the city in 1414 and 1419.

Political offices
Preceded by	Member of Parliament; 1414 (November)	Next: John Morton; Richard Russell
Preceded by Thomas Santon; John Blackburn	Member of Parliament; 1419	Next: John Penrith; Henry Preston
