= Rowntree Halt railway station =

Station in North Yorkshire, England, 1927–1988

Rowntree Halt
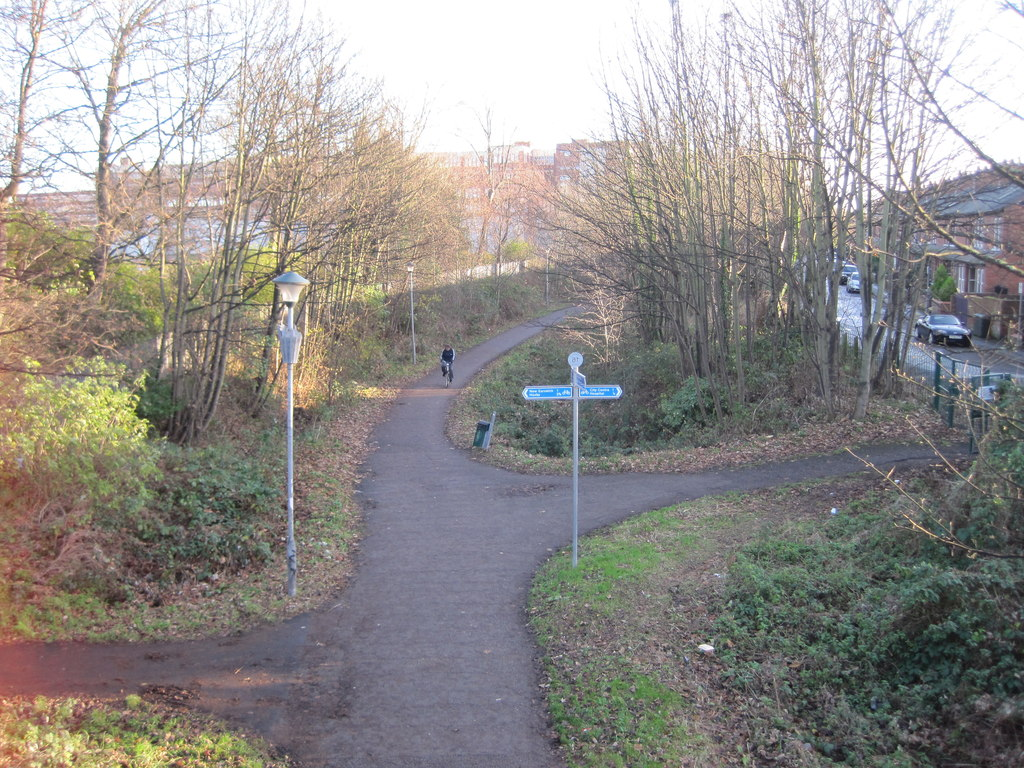
- Site of the former halt in 2012

General information
- Location: York, City of York; England
- Coordinates: 53.973600°N 1.079926°W
- Grid reference: SE604534
- Platforms: 1

Other information
- Status: Disused

History
- Original company: London and North Eastern Railway

Key dates
- 1927: Opened
- 8 July 1988: Closed
Location

Rowntree Halt was a minor unstaffed railway stop on the Foss Islands branch line in York. Located on the southern edge of the Rowntree's chocolate factory, Rowntree Halt was opened in 1927 by the London and North Eastern Railway to provide a low-volume, not publicly advertised passenger service to the Rowntree factory for workers commuting from areas south of York such as Selby and Doncaster. The halt itself was little more than a single short platform located a few yards west of a signal-protected siding that allowed freight directly into the factory complex. Passenger services ceased in 1988, and the station was officially closed on 8 July 1988. The line was dismantled and turned into a cycle track.
