= Coppergate Shopping Centre =

Shopping centre in York, England

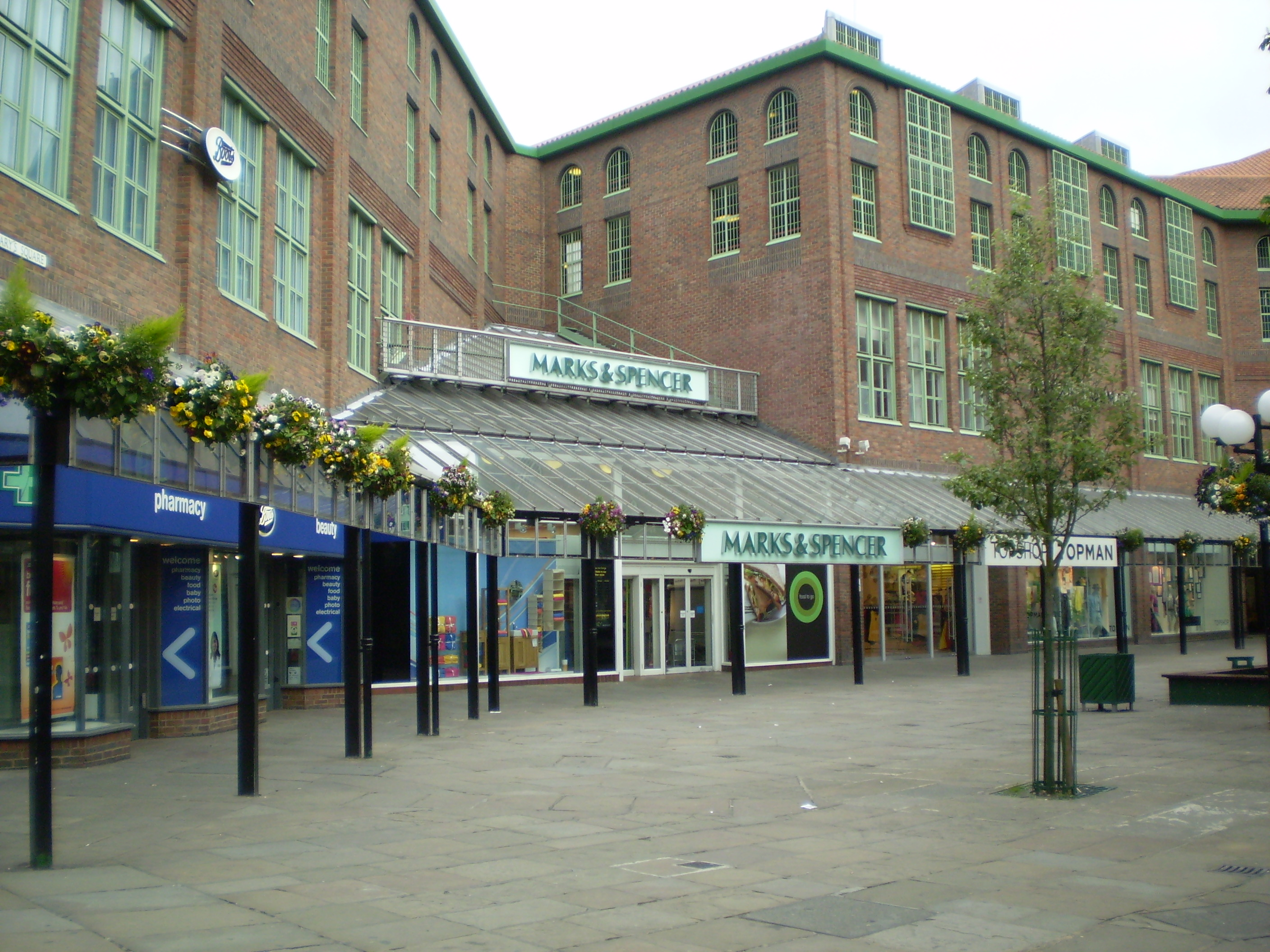
- Location: York, North Yorkshire, England
- Coordinates: 53°57′28″N 1°04′50″W
- Opened: 1984
- Num. of stores: 19
- Website: coppergateshopping.com

Coppergate Shopping Centre is a shopping centre in York in North Yorkshire, England. It is named after Coppergate, one of York's medieval streets ("gate" coming from the Old Norse gata, or street).

The Coppergate Centre is home to York's Brollywalk from around April to November each year, with a new display of umbrellas installed each month the length of Coppergate Walk. The first Brollywalk was installed in August 2017, and themes have included rainbow umbrellas for York Pride, floral umbrellas, Union Jack umbrellas, brollies with ribbons and many more, making this street a favourite for Instagrammers. Each October, the umbrellas are replaced with broomsticks and ghosts.

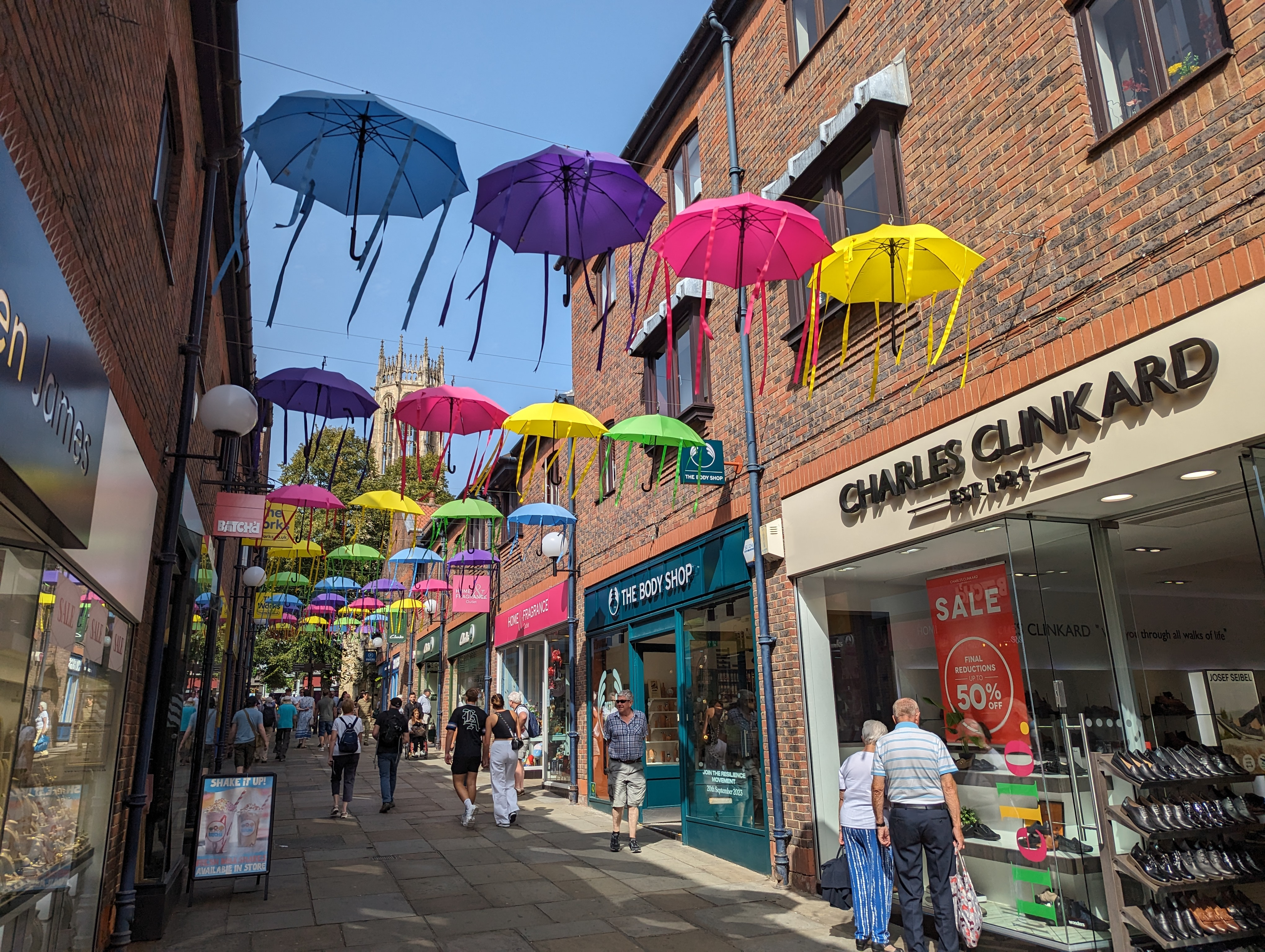
Coppergate Walk's Brollywalk

== History ==
Prior to the development of the shopping centre, archaeologists started digging on the site, which had been the Cravens confectionery factory. Between 1976–81, York Archaeological Trust unearthed remains of 10th-century Viking-age buildings from the Viking city of Jorvik. The remains lay in moist, spongy layers of earth similar to a peat bog. The damp conditions had helped to preserve everyday Viking items such as wood, leather, cloth, bugs and even a Viking toilet and its contents. Over 40,000 objects were uncovered by excavating 36,000 layers and sieving eight tonnes of soil.

When the extent and importance of the discoveries at Coppergate were realised, plans were made to allow permanent display of the remains of Jorvik within the excavation area. York Archaeological Trust created the Jorvik Viking Centre which opened to the public in April 1984. The exhibits in the Centre are based on evidence unearthed during the Coppergate excavations.

== Redevelopment plans ==
In 2001 developers launched a £60 million development scheme entitled 'Coppergate II' to redevelop the centre, including demolition of the existing centre and a new build project with shops either side of the River Foss. Retailers set to anchor the scheme included a new enlarged Debenhams and others. However the reaction from the public was negative and a petition was launched, this prompted a public inquiry and in September 2003 the scheme was turned down by the government. The level of opposition was due to some of parts of the shopping centre being in extremely close proximity to Clifford's Tower.

== Centre information ==
The shopping centre houses many shops, cafes and museums, including the Jorvik Viking Centre. Owned by La Salle Investment Management since February 2008, the centre is an open-air shopping promenade with covered walkways, and large public squares with fountains and planting beds, set with seats and coffee shops. Also included is St Mary's Church, which now displays modern art. This outdoor area is used to host brass bands, theatre productions and other events from York's many festivals.

== See also ==
- First York
