= William Bowes (15th century MP) =

English Member of Parliament

Member of the England Parliament for York
- In office 1416 (March) – 1416 (October)
- Preceded by: John Morton; Richard Russell
- Succeeded by: Unknown
- In office 1421 (March) – 1421 (December)
- Preceded by: John Penrith; Henry Preston
- Succeeded by: Thomas Gare; William Ormshead
- In office 1422–1425
- Preceded by: Thomas Gare; William Ormshead
- Succeeded by: Richard Russell
- In office 1431–Unknown
- Preceded by: William Ormshead
- Succeeded by: Thomas Scotton

Personal details
- Spouse: Isabel (d.1435)
- Children: William, Joan, Katherine + 1 other daughters

William Bowes was one of two Members of the Parliament of England for the constituency of York on four occasions.

== Life and politics ==
The earliest record of William Bowes appears in 1391 in connection to the source of his wealth, namely wool exports. He is not mentioned again until he becomes chamberlain of the City of York in 1399. He also held the offices of sheriff (1401–02) and lord mayor (1417–18 & 1428–29). A measure of his standing in the city was evident when he and his wife were granted a papal indult and gifts received from William Skirlaw, the then bishop of Durham. William was a member of the Calais Staple. He was returned as MP for the city on four occasions and, as a member of the council of twelve, was involved in the elections on ten more occasions. William was reprimanded in 1418 by Humphrey, Duke of Gloucester for apparently polluting the royal fisheries on the River Foss. This may have been caused by sewage from properties he owned in nearby Peasholm.

William was married to Isabel, who died in 1435 and had one son, William and three daughters. He was related by marriage to fellow merchant John Blackburn, who married his daughter Joan. He died in 1439 and was buried next to his wife in St Cuthbert's Church in York, a building he had paid to have rebuilt and restored. He left his holdings in Peasholm and Colliergate to his son, William. His daughter, Katherine, received his property on Thursday Market. He left his grandson, William, his armour and jewelry.

Political offices
Preceded by John Morton; Richard Russell	Member of Parliament; 1416 (March)– 1421 (October)	Next: Unknown
Preceded by John Penrith; Henry Preston	Member of Parliament; 1421 (March) – 1421 (December)	Next: Thomas Gare; William Ormshead
Preceded by Thomas Gare; William Ormshead	Member of Parliament; 1422 – 1425	Next: Richard Russell
Preceded by William Ormshead	Member of Parliament; 1431 – Unknown	Next: Thomas Scotton
