= Foss Islands branch line =

Disused railway line in Yorkshire, England

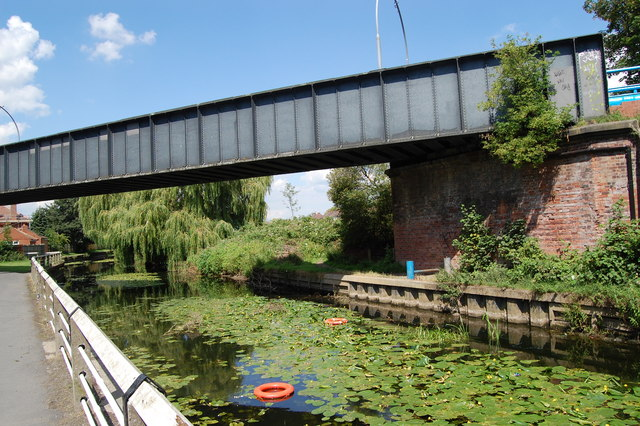
Old railway bridge across the River Foss

The Foss Islands branch line was a former railway branch in the city of York. The line, about 1 3/4 miles (2.8 km) long, opened in 1880, connecting the York–Scarborough line of the North Eastern Railway to a large freight depot in the Foss Islands area of the city.

== Freight traffic ==
Much of the traffic on the branch line served the Rowntree's factory on Haxby Road. In the Foss Islands area, there were sidings to:

- the York Gas Company's premises near Monk Bridge
- a York Corporation depot that included a power station and a refuse destructor, and
- the Navigation Warehouse belonging to Leetham's Mill at the junction of the River Foss and Wormald's Cut
- the British Transport Hotels laundry

== Passenger service ==
A minor passenger service (not shown in public timetables) was provided from 1927 onwards to a small station called Rowntree Halt south of the factory and close to the junction of the branch with the Scarborough line. This allowed Rowntree workers from areas south of York such as Selby and Doncaster to commute directly to the factory, and was also used for works visits and workers' excursions. The halt officially closed on 8 July 1988.

== Connection to the DVLR ==
The Foss Islands end of the branch line was connected with the new Derwent Valley Light Railway's northern terminus at York (Layerthorpe) railway station when it opened in 1913.

== Final years ==
After the DVLR closed in 1981, freight generated by the Rowntree factory ensured the survival of the Foss Islands branch for eight more years and it was finally closed in 1989 with the tracks being lifted in 1992. Some of the former route between the site of the former junction with the York to Scarborough Line and Layerthorpe, along with the stretch of the DVLR from there to Osbaldwick, has since been converted into a cycle track by Sustrans.
