= Layerthorpe =

Suburb of York, England

Coordinates: 53.962°N 1.060°W

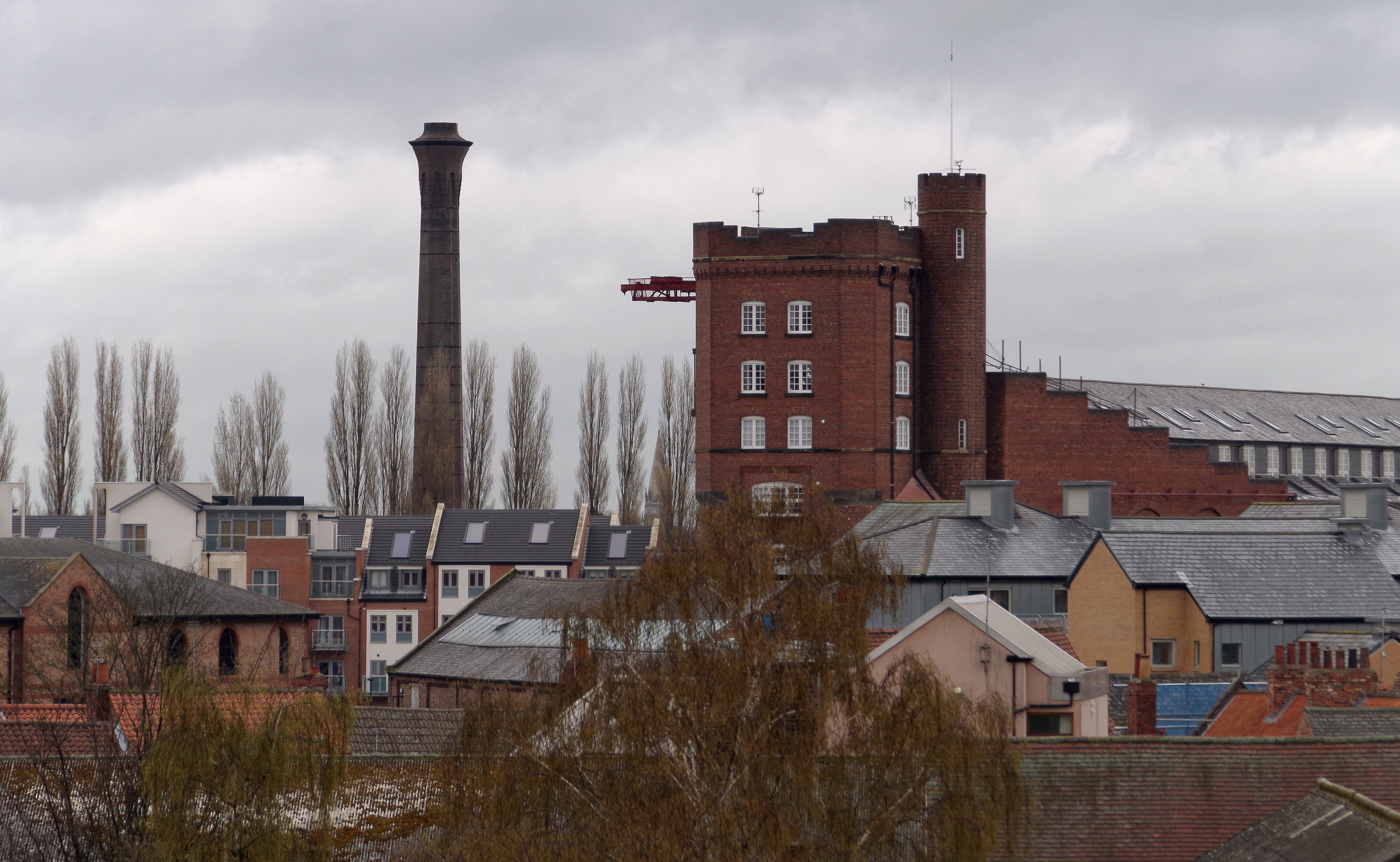
- View of Foss Islands Chimney

- Location within North Yorkshire
- OS grid reference: SE617521
- Unitary authority: City of York
- Ceremonial county: North Yorkshire
- Region: Yorkshire and the Humber
- Country: England
- Sovereign state: United Kingdom
- Post town: YORK
- Postcode district: YO31
- Police: North Yorkshire
- Fire: North Yorkshire
- Ambulance: Yorkshire
- UK Parliament: York Central

Layerthorpe is a part of the city of York in, North Yorkshire, England. It is outside the city walls of York. The road through Layerthorpe from the bridge over the River Foss to Heworth is also shares the same name.

== Origin of the name ==
York historian Francis Drake suggested in his Eboracum (1736) that the first part of the name referred to a resting-place (or "lair") used by deer on the edge of the Forest of Galtres. The second part ("thorpe") is a placename suffix used within the Danelaw for small settlements adjacent to larger ones. The earliest known reference (in a charter of 1184–9) calls the area (then a village) "Leirthorp".

== History ==
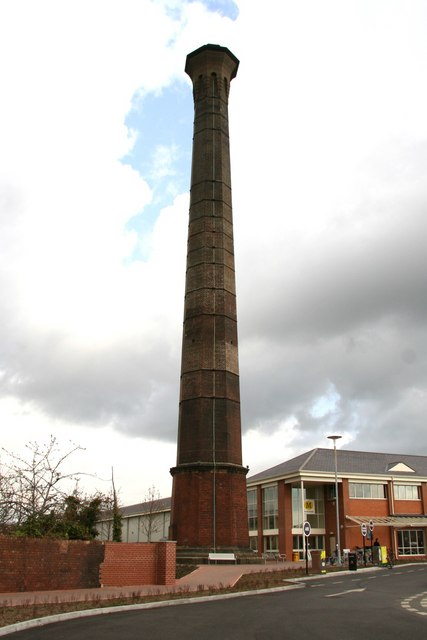
Octagonal brick chimney from the refuse destructor

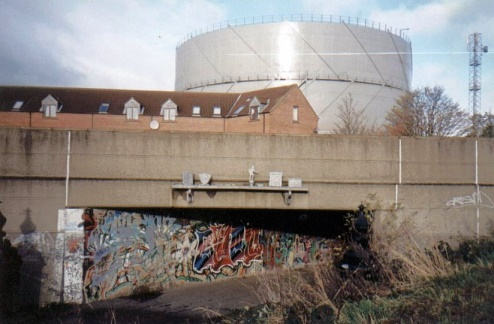
Layerthorpe gas holder (now demolished)

After William the Conqueror created a dam in the River Foss in 1069 to create a moat around York Castle, the river flooded in the Layerthorpe area, forming a large lake that would become known as the "King's Pool" (or "King's Fishpool"). The King's Pool became an integral part of the city's defences during the Middle Ages – this explains the absence of defensive wall in the area today – and was well known for its abundance of fish.

The fourteenth-century Layerthorpe Bridge, a crossing of the Foss, adjacent to the King's Pool, was once attached to a postern in the city wall, known as Layerthorpe Postern. In 1829, the bridge was rebuilt, and the Postern and a short section of wall were demolished. In 1926, the bridge was widened again, and in the 1990s it was completely rebuilt on a different alignment.

Layerthorpe bridge led to the area of Layerthorpe on the road, now called Layerthorpe, which runs from York to the suburb of Heworth. There was a medieval church (St. Mary's, Layerthorpe), which was built about fifty yards from the bridge in the fourteenth century or earlier. The church was closed in 1549, and the parish was united with that of St. Cuthbert's, Peasholme Green, in 1586. The church has disappeared, although its foundations were temporarily uncovered in 1920.

Meanwhile, the King's Pool declined, as silt from upriver collected and there was not enough water coming down to move it on. In the eighteenth century, the waters were so low that marshy islands had begun to appear, giving the area the additional name of Foss Islands, and during the summer months the river smelled foul and was mostly dry and stagnant. At the end of the eighteenth century, the Foss was canalised and the Pool disappeared. In 1854, the area was drained and Foss Islands Road (now part of the York Inner Ring Road) was constructed between Layerthorpe Bridge and Walmgate Bar.

In 1824, the York Gas Light Company began production on a site between Layerthorpe and Monkgate. This was expanded in 1885, and a siding from the Foss Islands Branch Line was constructed to serve it. The Branch Line had been opened in 1880 to serve the cattle-market at Walmgate Bar and to provide facilities for freight traffic, including deliveries of coal and, later, sand for bottle-making, on the eastern side of the city.

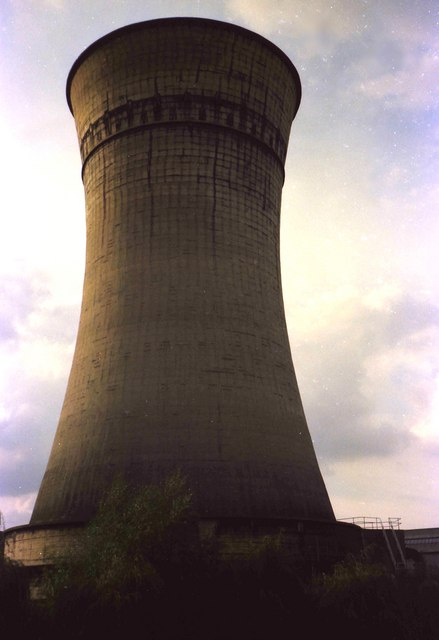
York Power Station Cooling Tower

On Foss Islands Road, just south of Layerthorpe Bridge, York Corporation built a power station and refuse destructor in the 1890s, again with sidings off the Branch Line. The 55 metres octagonal brick chimney from the refuse destructor has been preserved and was listed as Grade II in 1983.

York (Layerthorpe) railway station, the northern terminus of the Derwent Valley Light Railway (DVLR) which connected with the Foss Islands Branch, opened in 1913. It was located on Hallfield Road.

== Layerthorpe today ==
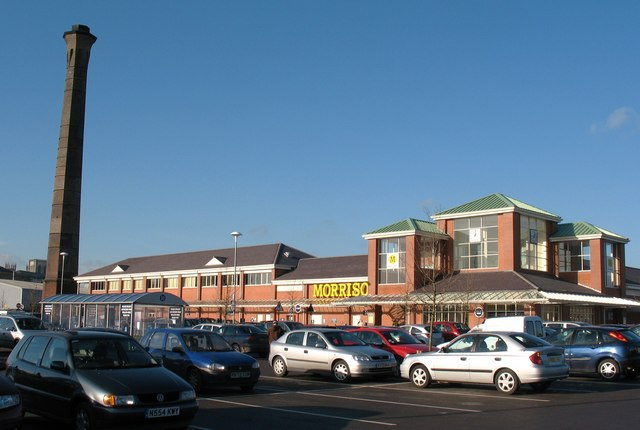
Morrisons Supermarket

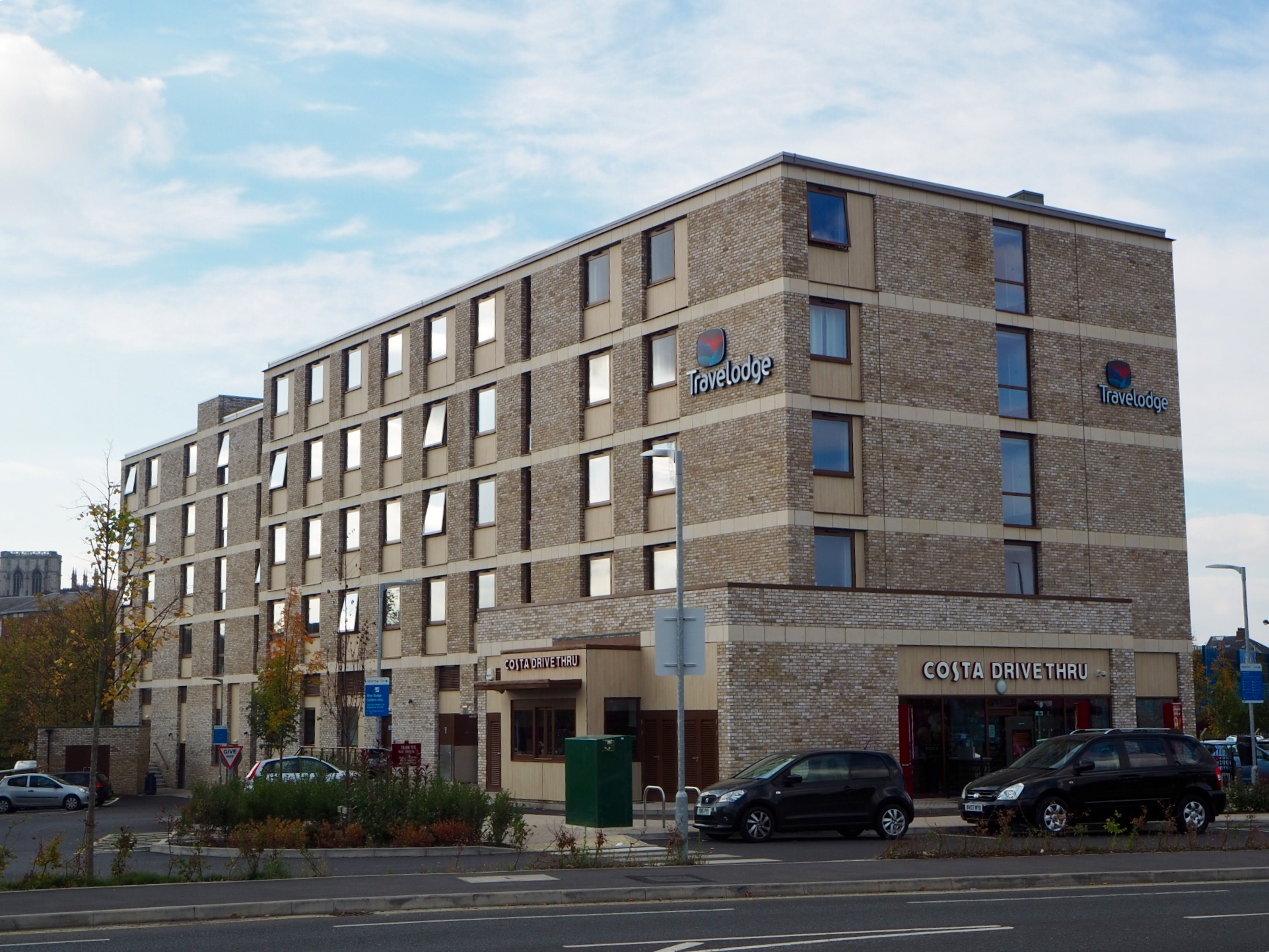
Travelodge Layerthorpe

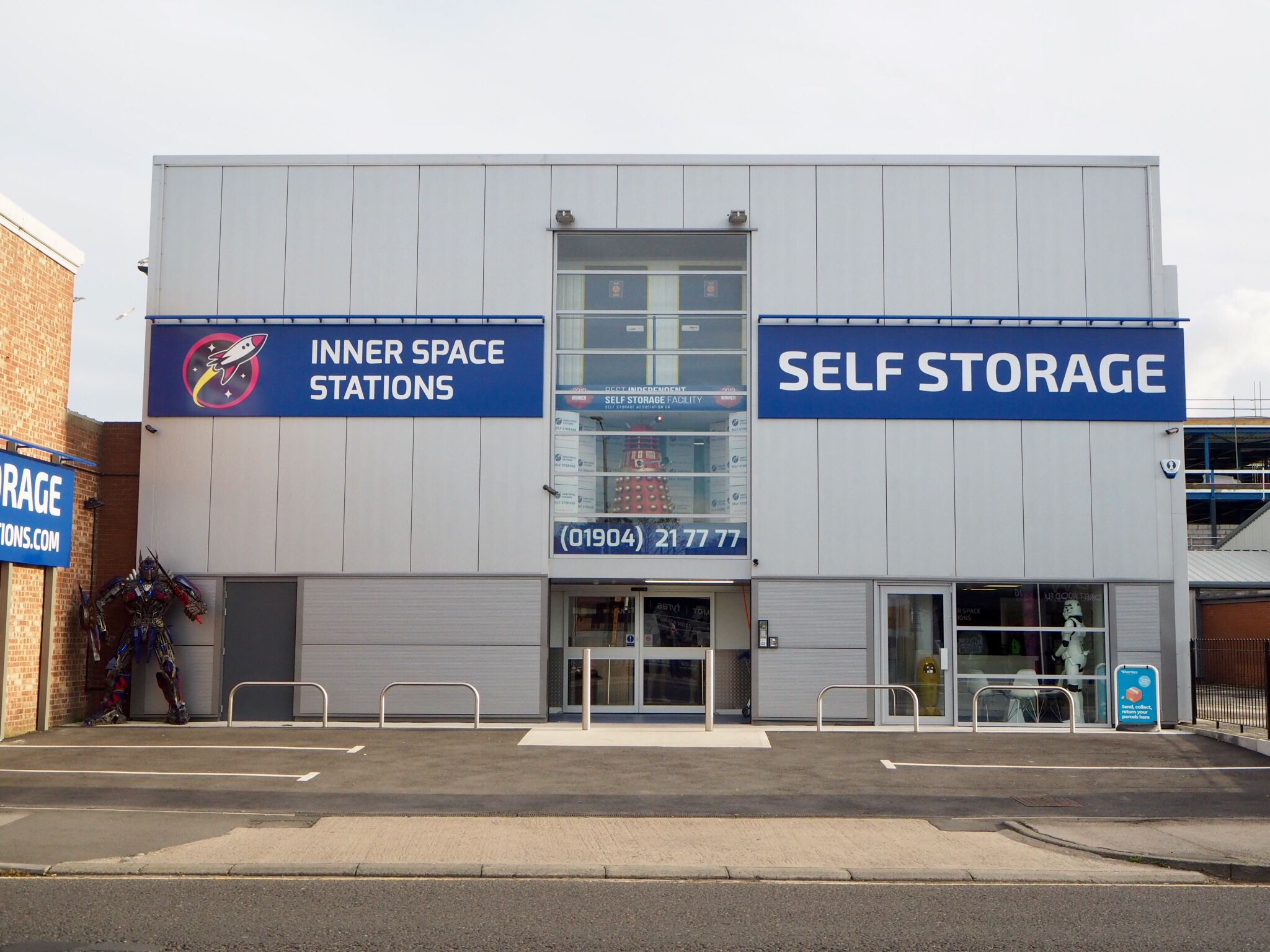
Storage Facility

All the railway lines in the Layerthorpe area had been closed by 1989, and the route of the DVLR and part of the Branch Line is now a footpath and cycle-path. The Branch Line's sidings and the corporation's premises have been replaced by a variety of industrial and retail units (and increasingly, residential). No trace of the railway station remains, and Hallfield Road, a through-route to the A1079 since 2007, contains much recent housing. New buildings are also beginning to appear on the gasworks site.
