= Foss Island Power Station =

Former power station in York, England

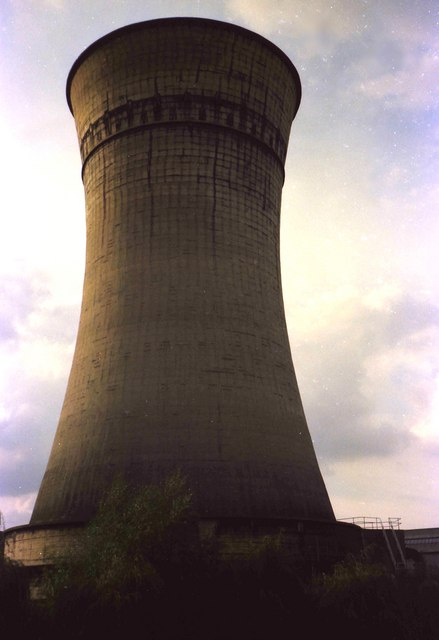
- Country: England
- Location: North Yorkshire, Yorkshire and the Humber
- Coordinates: 53.960°N 1.068°W
- Commission date: 1900
- Decommission date: 1976
- Owners: York Corporation (1900–1948); British Electricity Authority (1948–1955); Central Electricity Authority (1955–1957); Central Electricity Generating Board (1958–1976)
- Operator: As owner

Thermal power station
- Primary fuel: Coal
- Turbine technology: Steam turbine
- Chimneys: 1
- Cooling towers: 1
- Cooling source: River water and Cooling Tower

Power generation
- Units operational: 40 MW
- Units decommissioned: All
- Nameplate capacity: 40 MW
- Annual net output: 54.77 GWh (1971–72)

Foss Island Power Station, also known as York Power Station, was a small 40 MW coal-fired power station serving the city of York.

It was located in the Layerthorpe area of the city, to the east of the city centre.

It was built by York Corporation in the 1890s, opened in February 1900 and closed on 25 October 1976.

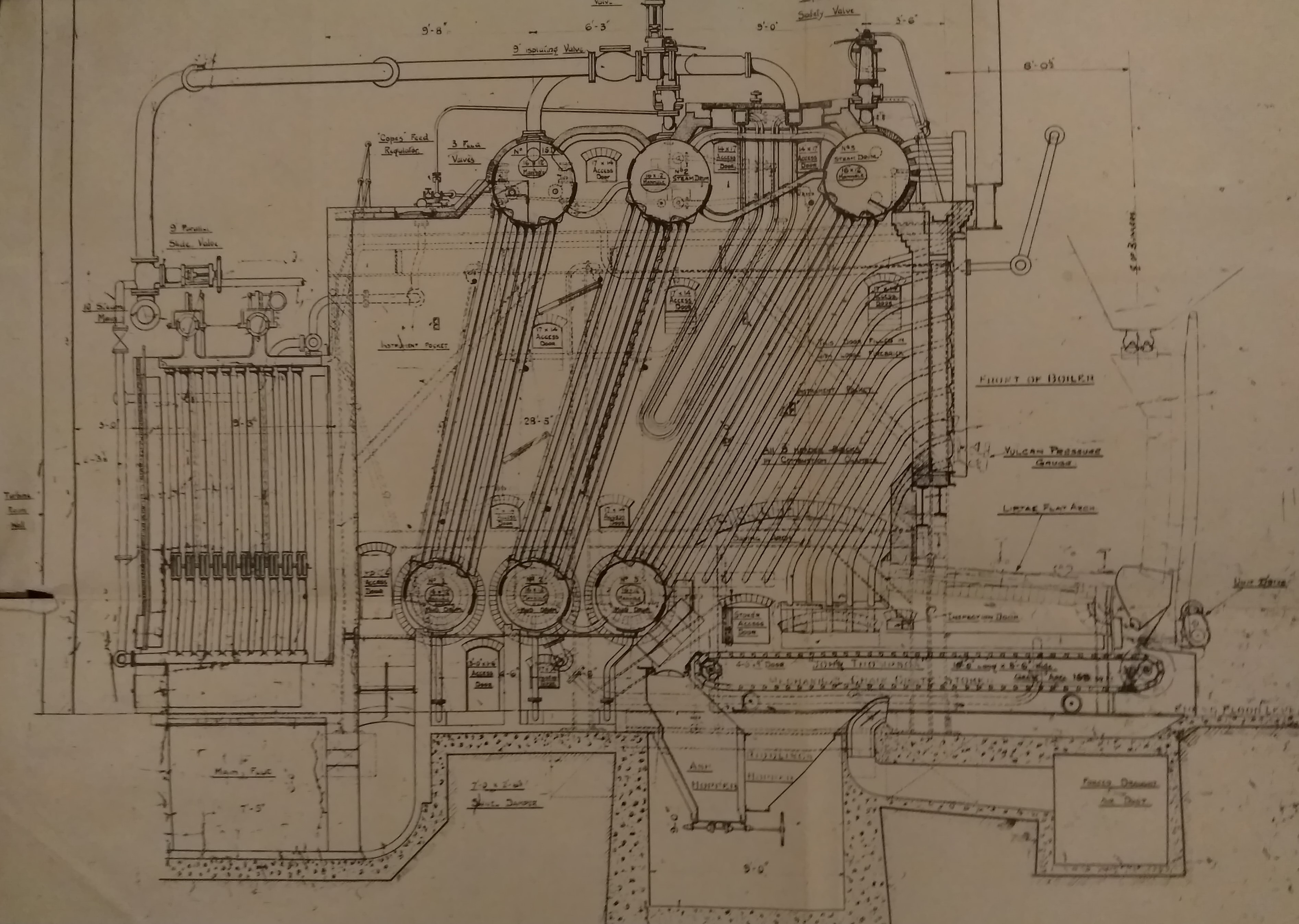

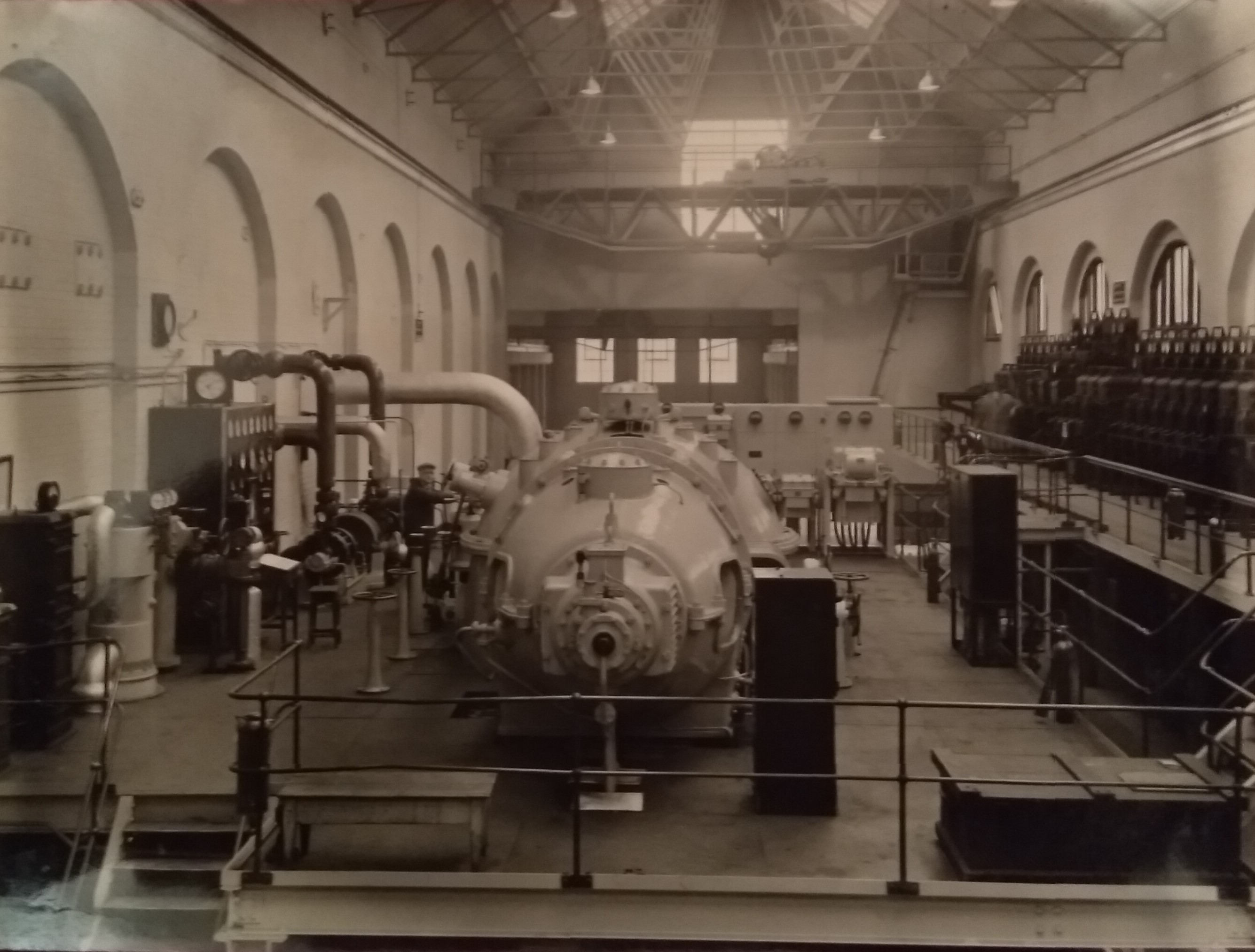

== History ==
In 1923 the station was supplying 3-phase AC at 400 and 230 V; DC at 460 and 230 V; and DC for traction at 500 V. The steam turbine driven AC generators comprised two 1,250 kW and two 3,500 kW machines. DC current was produced by two 500 kW oil-driven machines. Electricity supplies were supplemented by a water powered generating station near Linton-on-Ouse (Linton Lock Hydro), which was commissioned in 1923 and comprised a 250 kW and a 500 kW generator. In 1923 the facilities at York generated 15.128 GWh of electricity. The sales of electricity produced a surplus of revenue over expenses of £26,938 for the corporation.

=== Boiler explosion – 1949 ===
On 27 October 1949 at 4.23 a.m. the No. 1 Low Pressure Boiler exploded. This took place on the centre mid drum which ripped along its longitudinal seam. Sections were blown 50 yards away.

The rear boiler section and economiser were blown into the turbine hall causing 35 and 20 ton overhead cranes to collapse, writing off a 3,500 KW turbo alternator and 1,000 KW motor generator set. The south end of the boiler house was completely wrecked.

Power was restored to York 9.20 p.m. from the remaining generator sets the same day. Partial demolition of the station building was followed by reconstruction which was completed by August 1950. The turbine house was in full working order by January 1951

=== Plant specification ===
The steam plant at Foss Island were chain grate stoker boilers capable of delivering 400,000 lb/h (50.4 kg/s) of steam at 400 psi (27.6 bar) and 399/427 °C. The generating capacity of the station was 40 MW. Steam condensing and cooling was by river water and a single concrete cooling tower. In the year ending 31 March 1972 the station delivered 54.772 GWh of electricity, its load factor (the average load as a per cent of maximum output capacity) was 16.4 per cent.

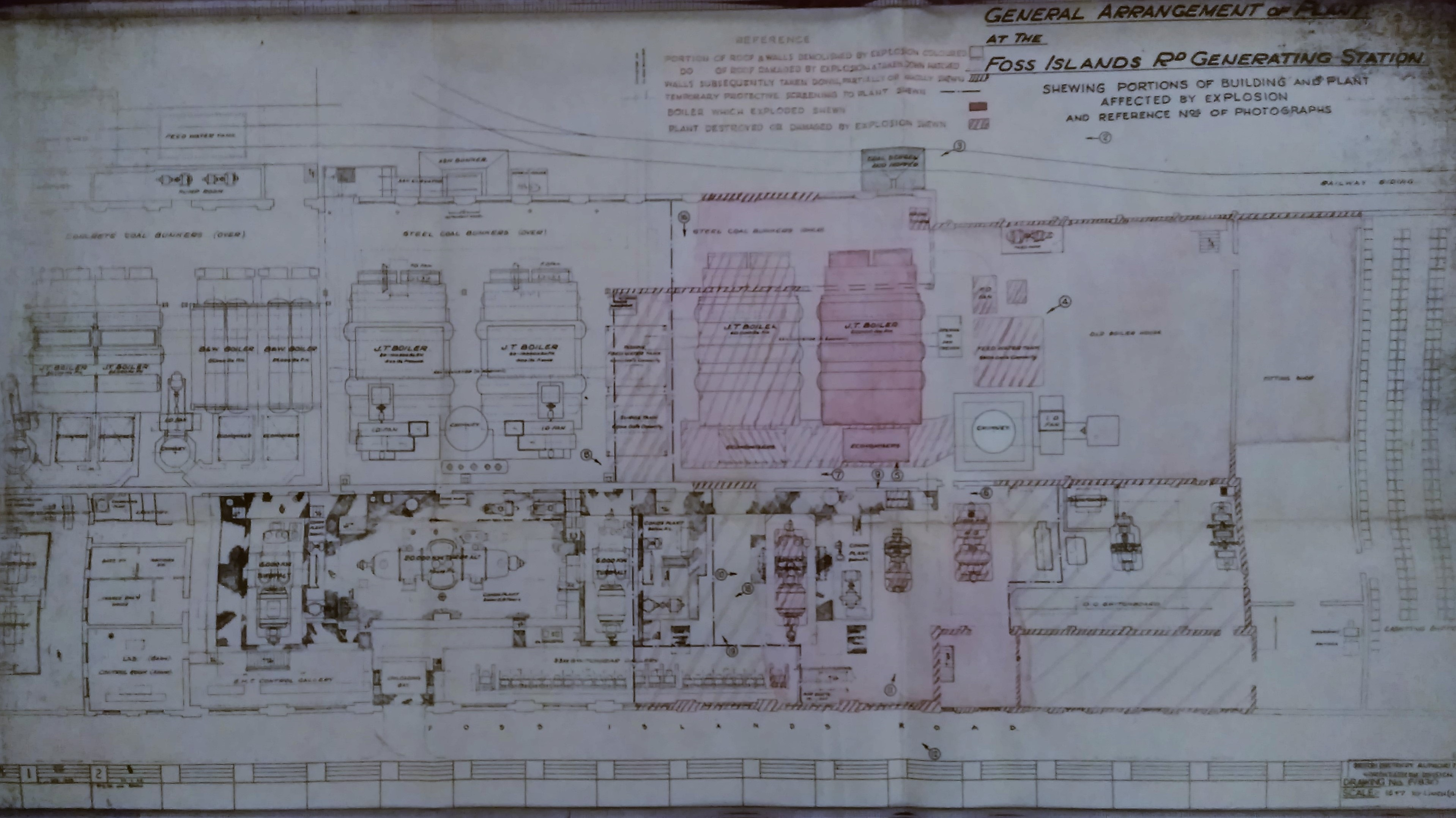

Electricity output from the station, in GWh

In 1958 the York electricity district supplied an area of 166,179 acres and a population of 152,269. The amount of electricity sold and the number and types of consumers was as follows:

Year	Electricity sold, MWh	No. of consumers
1956	187,527	50,114
1957	197,137	51,362
1958	210,417	52,675

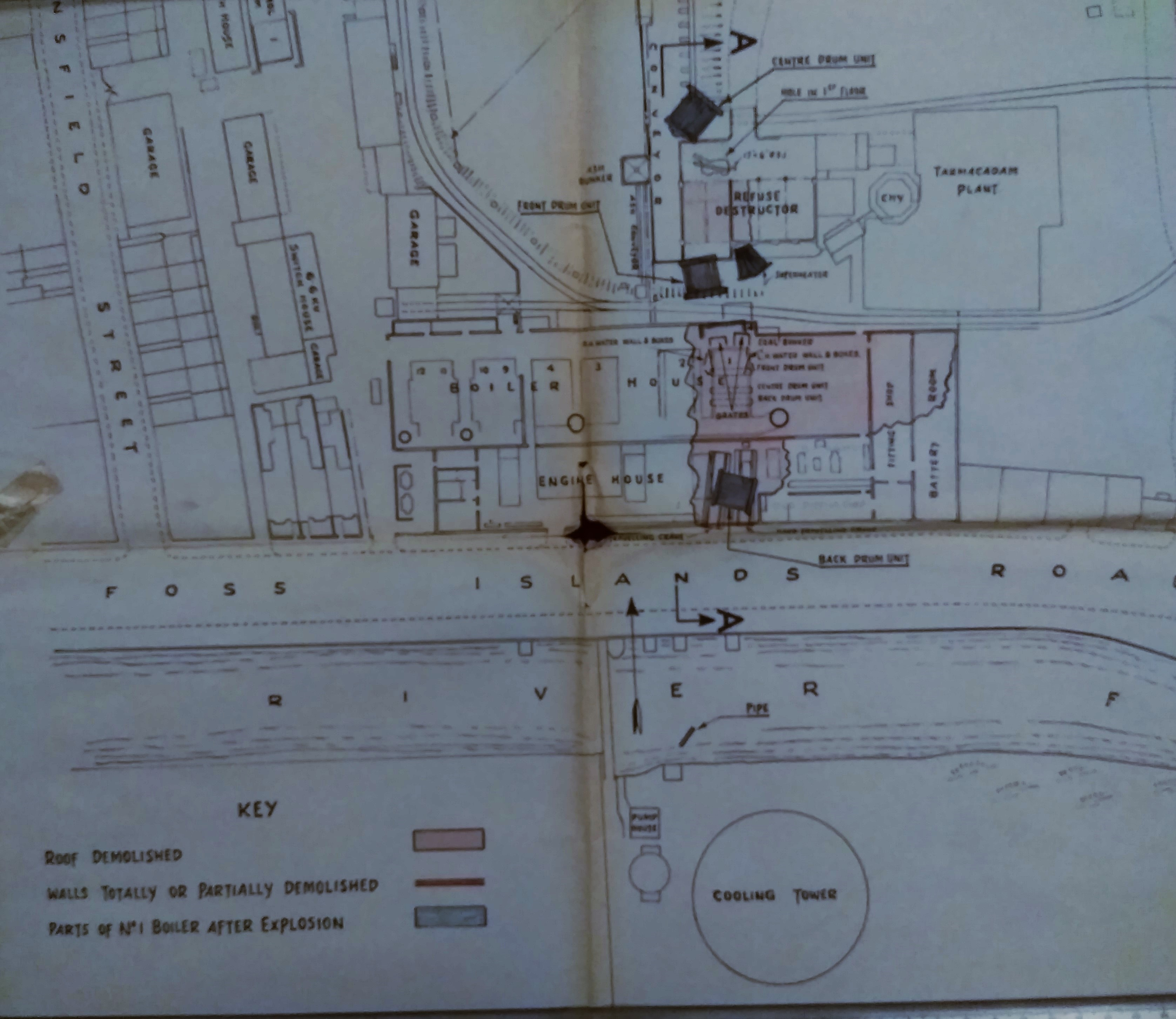

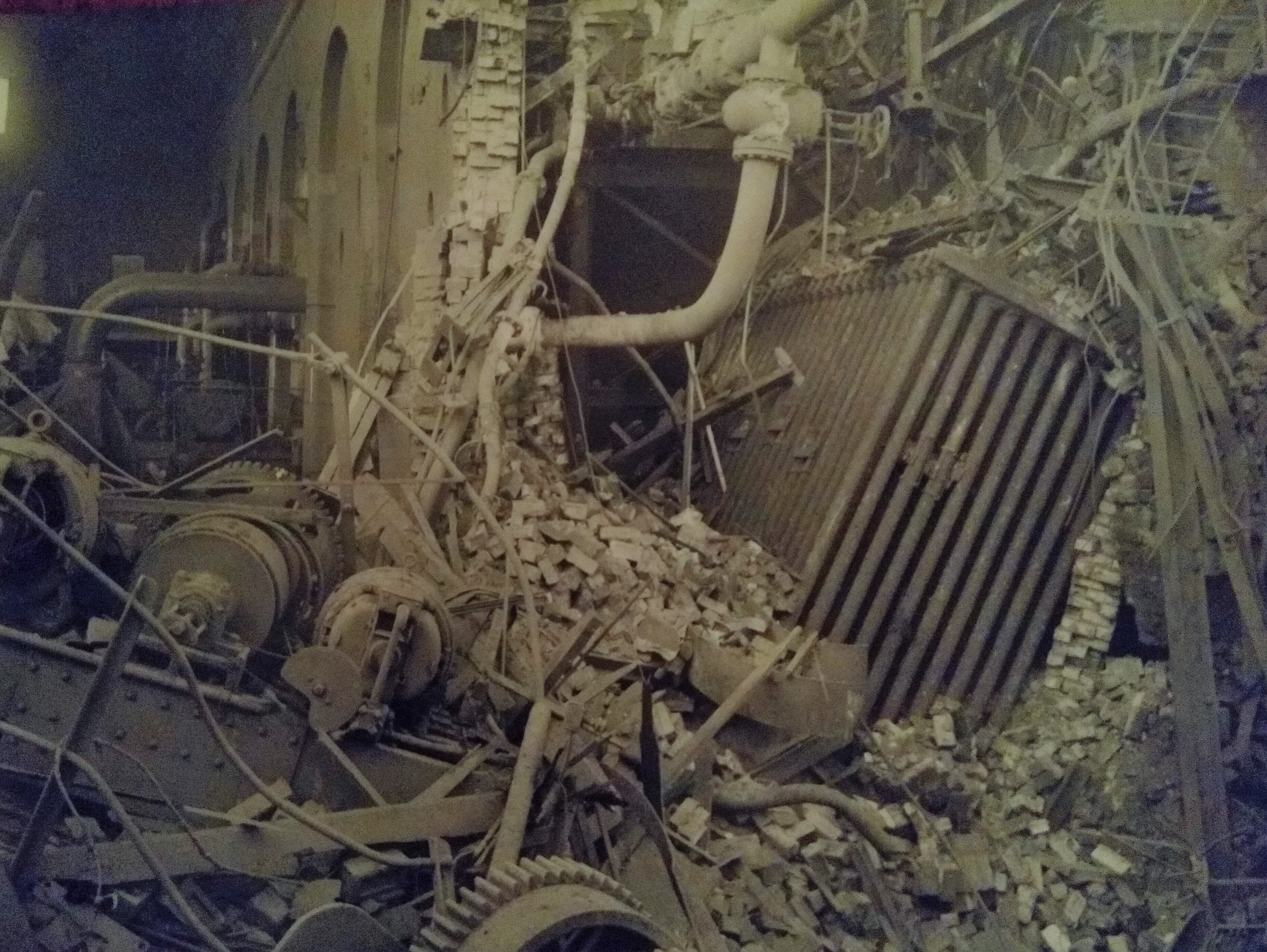

In 1958 the above totals were made up of the following:

Type of Consumer	No. of consumers	Electricity sold, MWh
Residential	46,254	87,671
Shops, offices, etc.	4,895	36,276
Factories	256	76,195
Farms	1,238	7,025
Public lighting	32	3,250
Total	52,675	210,417

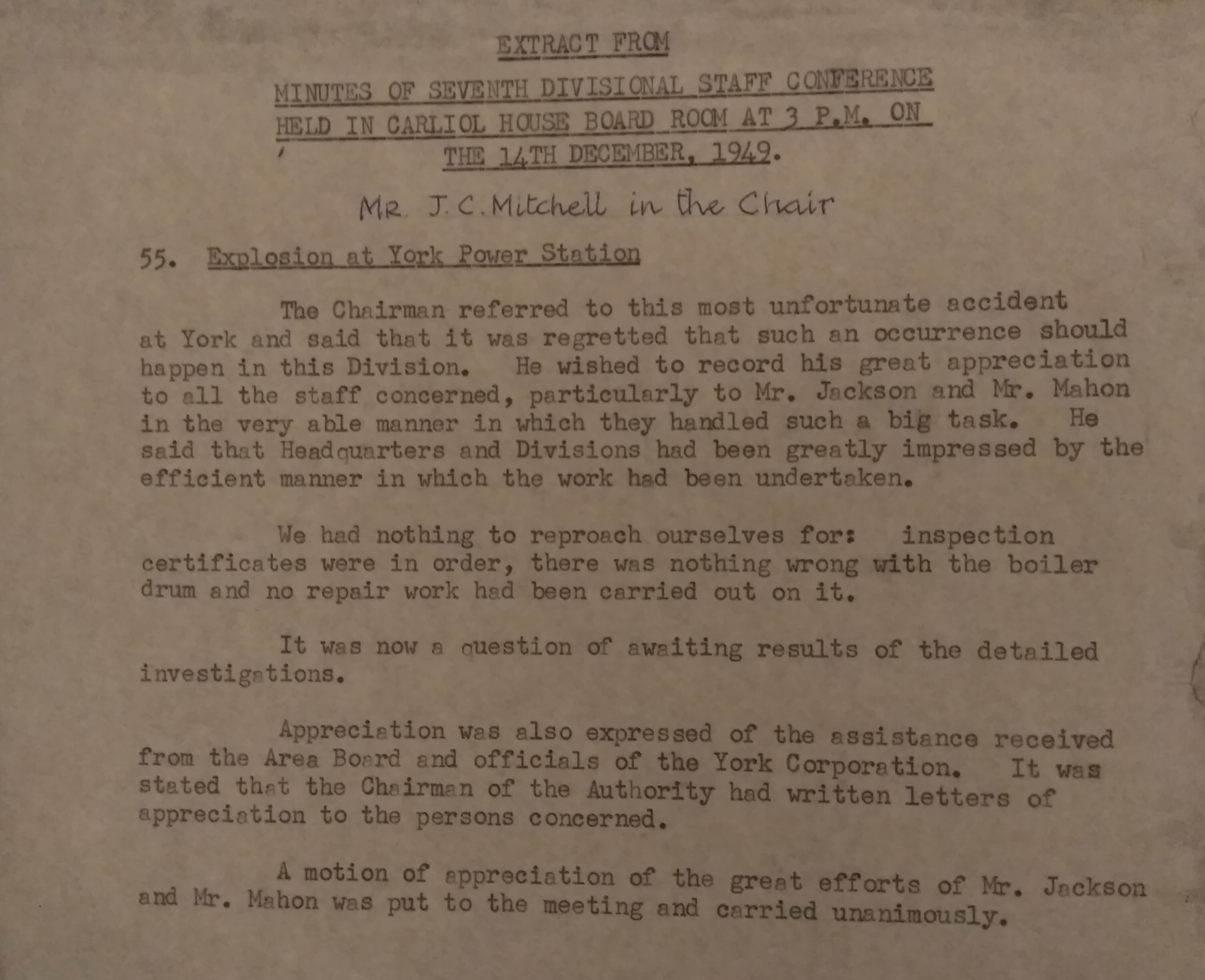

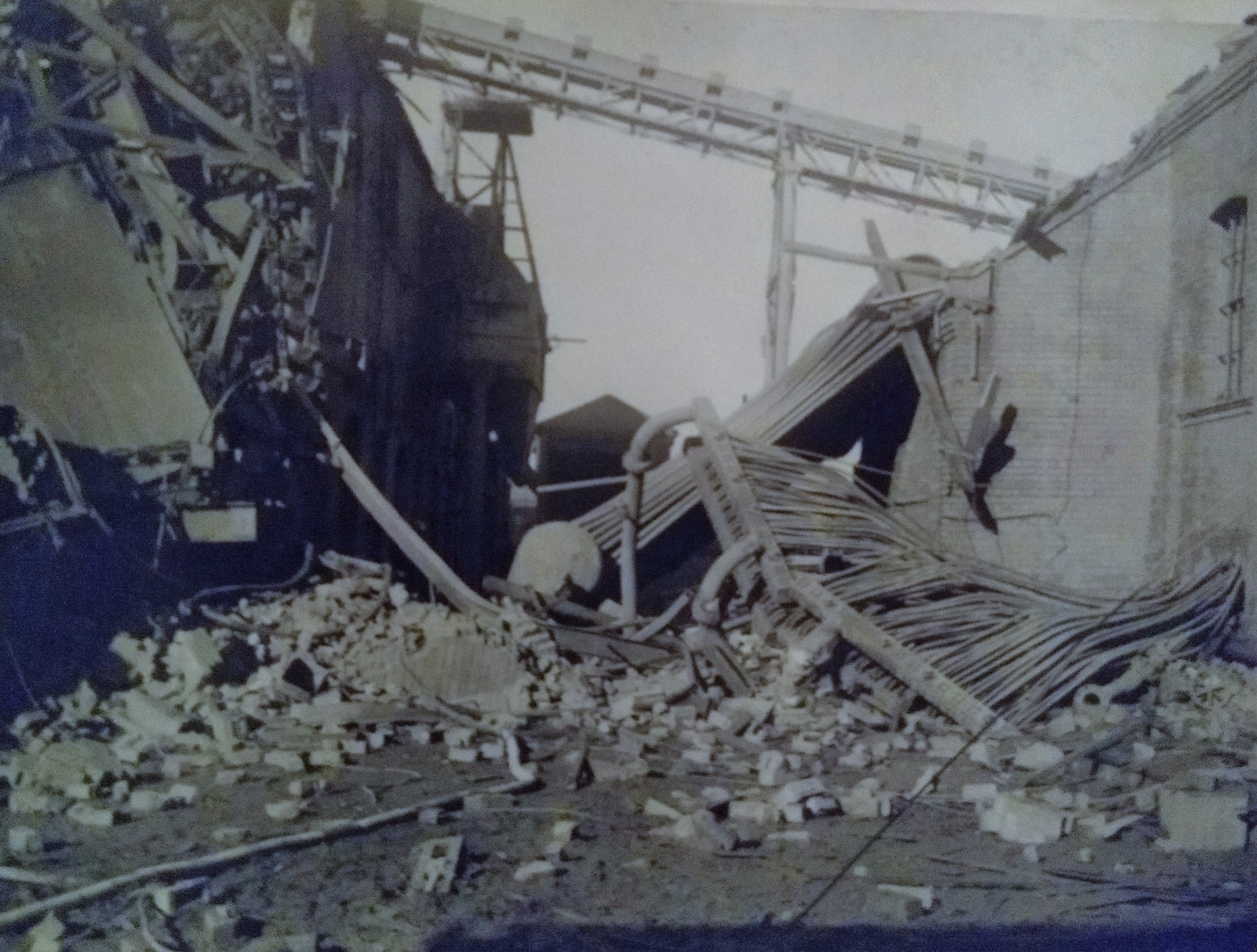

The buildings were demolished around 1980 and the transmission line which ran from the power station to a substation at Tang Hall Lane was dismantled at around the same time.

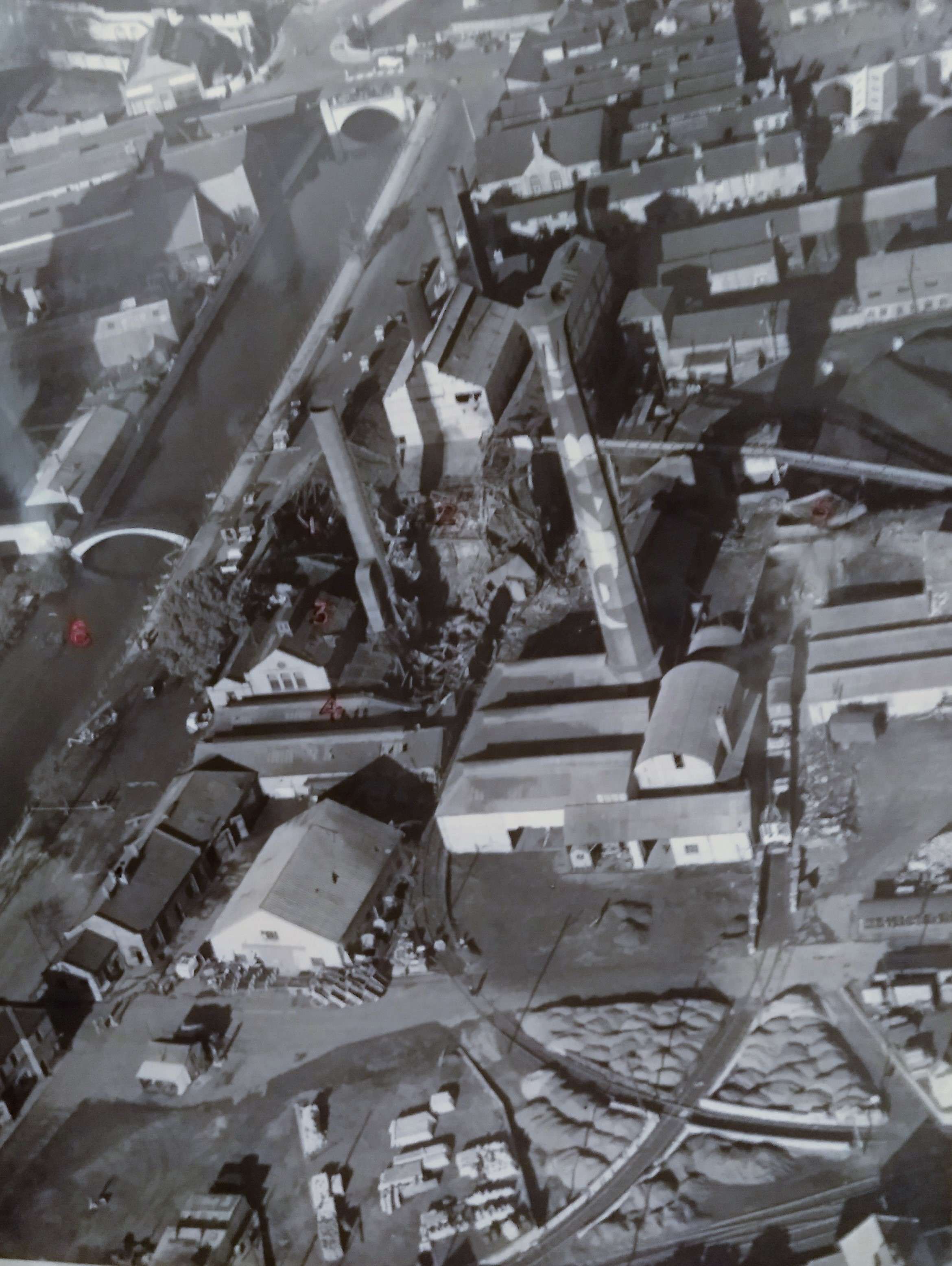
York Power Station 1949 Explosion – Aerial View, including WW2 camouflage paint on chimney

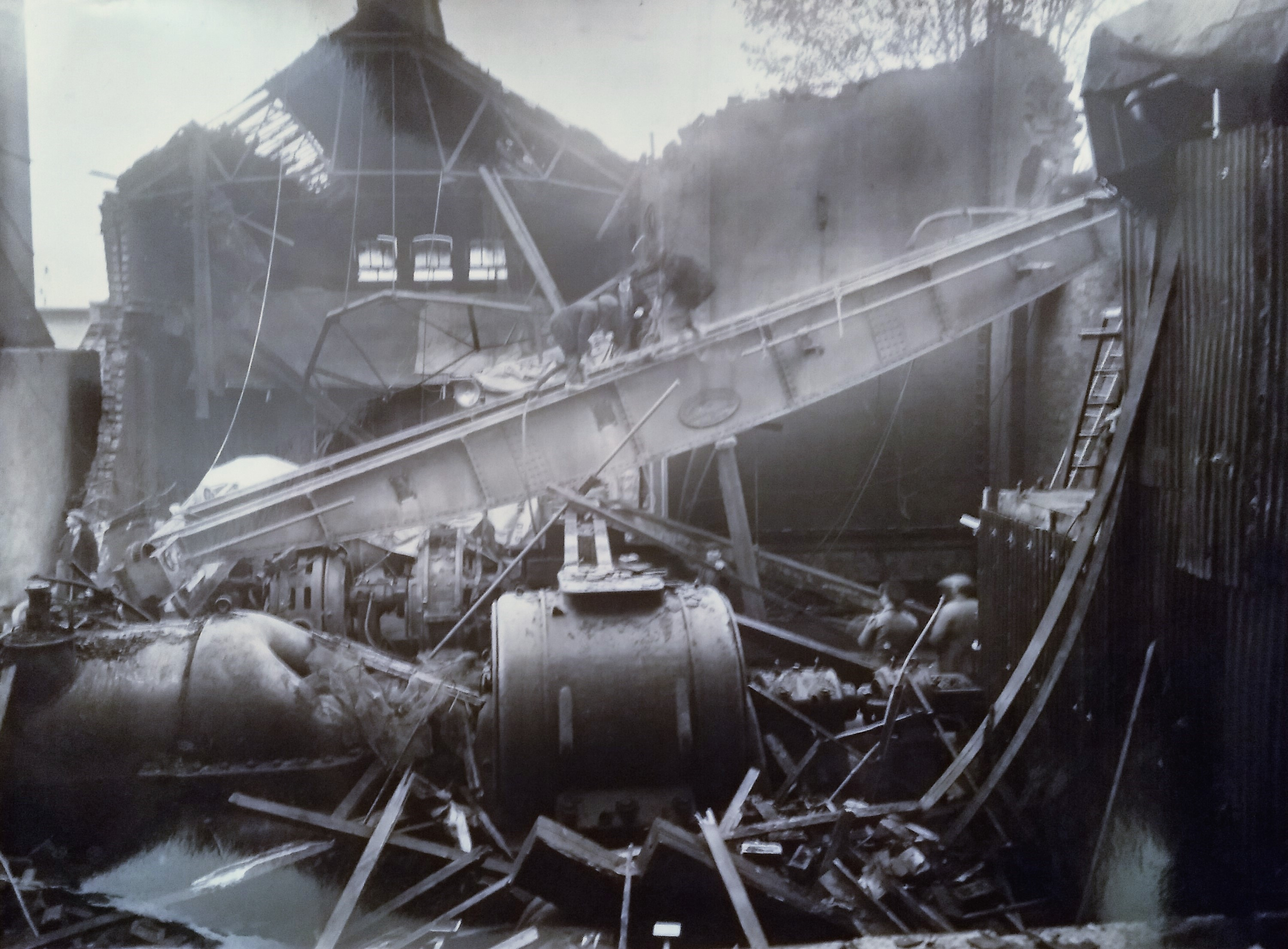

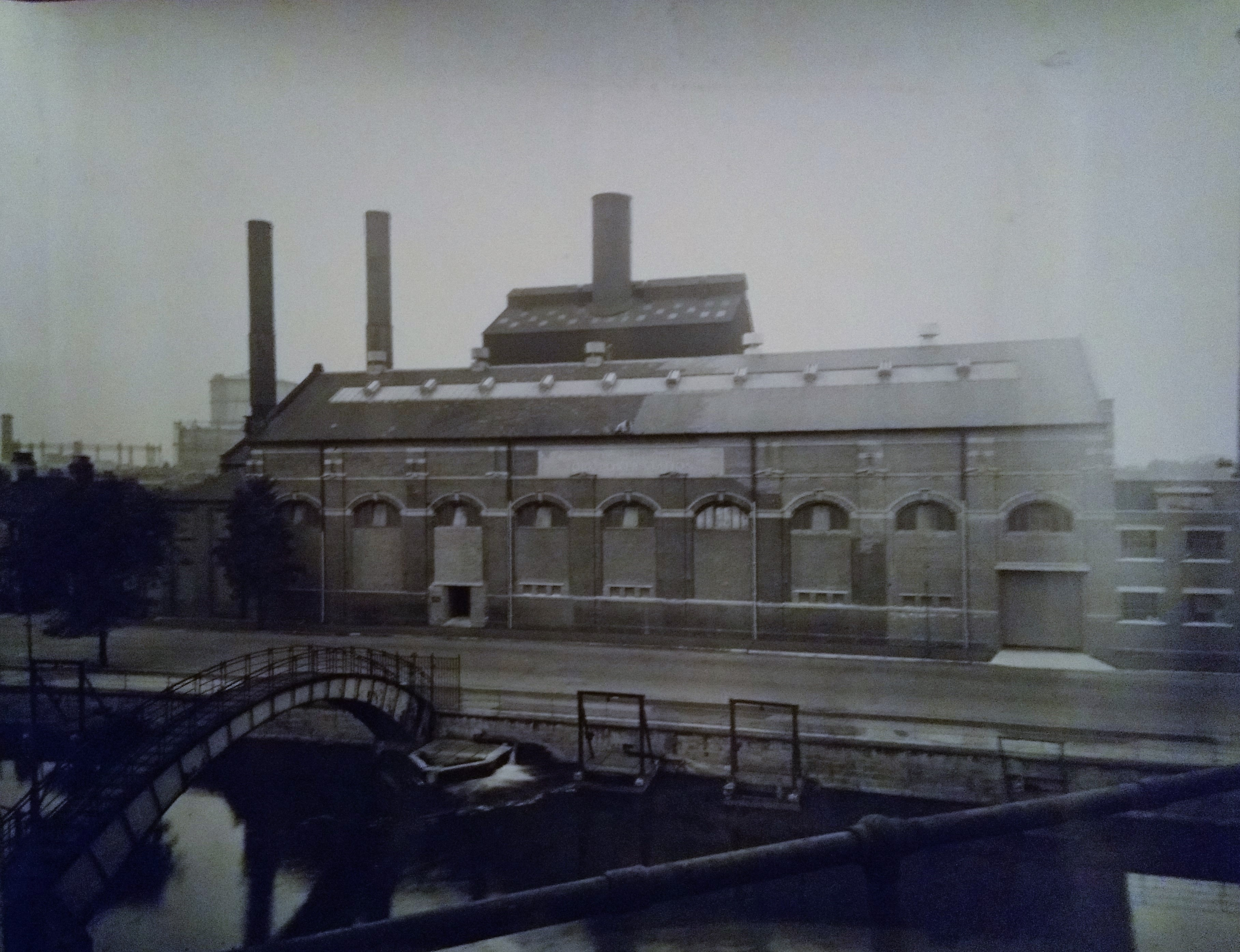
