= River Foss =

River in North Yorkshire, England

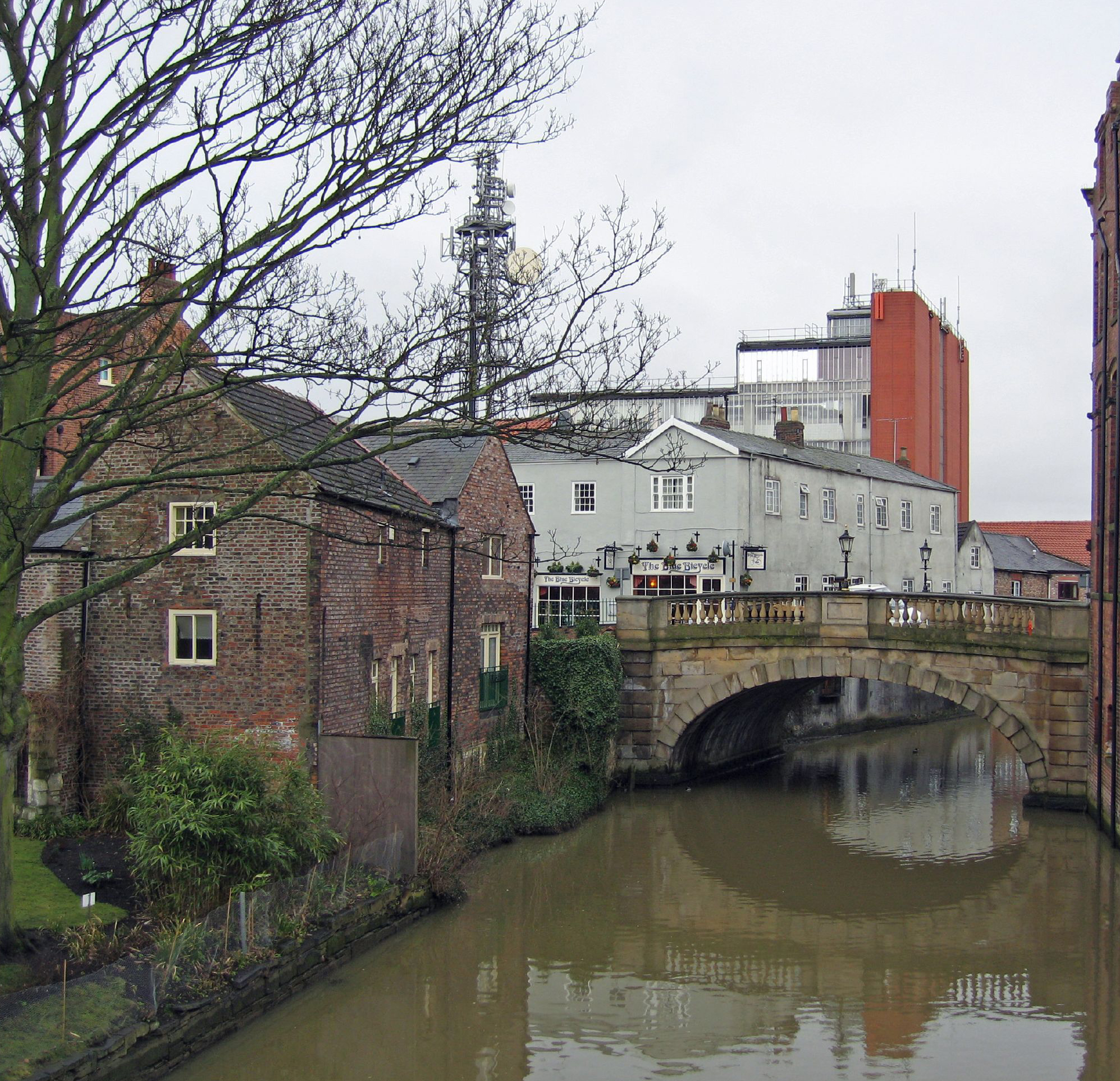
- The River Foss at York, looking upstream. The bridge is the Foss Bridge (1811–12), which links the streets of Fossgate and Walmgate.

Location
- Country: England

Physical characteristics
- Source
  - location: Near Oulston Reservoir, Yearsley
  - coordinates: 54°09′38″N 1°07′54″W
  - elevation: 160 m (520 ft)
- Mouth
  - location: River Ouse, York
  - coordinates: 53°57′05″N 1°04′42″W
  - elevation: 12 m (39 ft)
- Basin size: 118 km^{2} (46 sq mi)

The River Foss is in North Yorkshire, England. It is a tributary of the River Ouse. It rises in the Foss Crooks Woods near Oulston Reservoir close to the village of Yearsley and runs south through the Vale of York to the Ouse in the centre of York. The name most likely comes from the Latin word Fossa, meaning ditch. It is mentioned in the Domesday Book. The York district was settled by Norwegian and Danish people, so parts of the place names could be old Norse. Referring to the etymological dictionary "Etymologisk ordbog", ISBN 82-905-2016-6 deals with the common Danish and Norwegian languages – roots of words and the original meaning. The old Norse word Fos (waterfall) means impetuous. The River Foss was dammed, and even though the elevation to the River Ouse is small, a waterfall was formed. This may have led to the name Fos which became Foss.

The responsibility for the management of the river's drainage area is the Foss Internal drainage board (IDB). It has responsibility for the area from Crayke to the pre-1991 city boundary of York covering 9,085 hectares and 162.54 km of waterways. The Foss IDB is part of the York Consortium of Drainage Boards that oversees 10 IDB's in the Yorkshire region.

The typical river level range at the Foss Barrier is between 5.05m and 7.90m. The highest river level recorded was 10.20 metres and the river level reached 9.34 metres on 23 January 2008.

== Course ==
The source of the Foss is a spring in the Howardian Hills adjacent to, and flowing into, Oulston Reservoir near Newburgh Priory, four miles (6.5 km) north of Easingwold. From there to the Blue Bridge in York, where it joins the Ouse, it is 19.5 miles (31 km) in length. For part of its way it runs close to the B1363 between Brandsby and Stillington. The river flows in wide meanders in a southerly direction for most of its course towards York. As of 2010 the river is navigable for some 1.5 miles (2 km) upstream of Castle Mills Lock. The bridges by Peasholme Green and Foss Bank restrict the headroom to an air space of 2.4 metres.

== River modifications ==
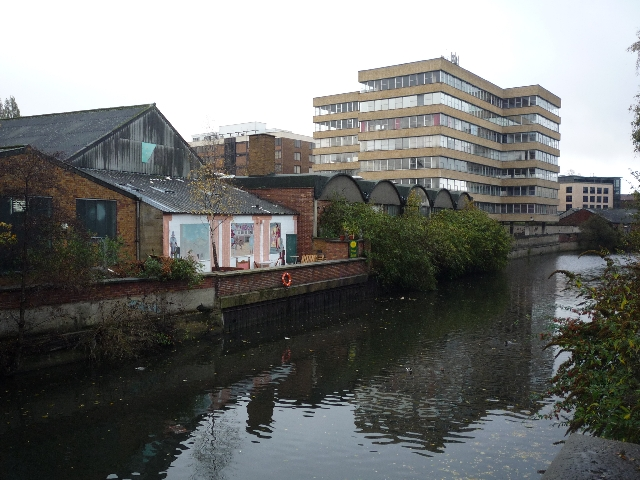
The River Foss in Central York

The Foss Barrier was built across the river near its mouth at Castle Mills. When closed, it prevents floodwater from the Ouse forcing the flow of the Foss back on itself. When the Ouse reaches 7.0m above ordnance datum, the staff at the barrier are alerted. When the level reaches 7.55m AOD the barrier is lowered after running pumps for several minutes to clear silt and debris from the river bed to make a watertight fit. It takes four minutes to lower the barrier.

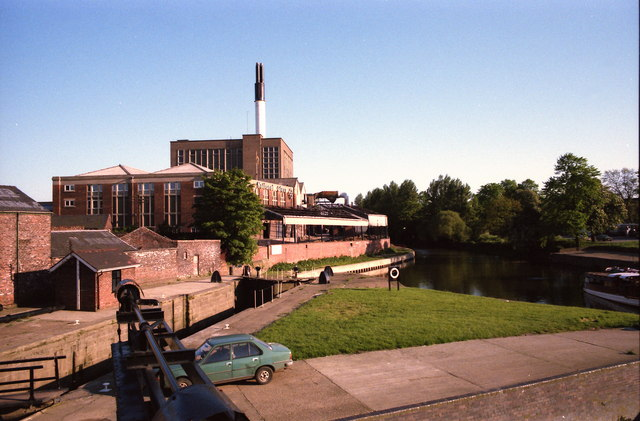
York Foss Locks and Sluice in the late 1980s

To avoid the build-up of water behind the barrier causing the Foss to burst its banks, water is pumped around the barrier into the Ouse by eight pumps that can pump water at 50 tonnes per second preventing the Foss flowing back on itself. The water pumped out should maintain a water level of 7.4m AOD behind the barrier. When both sides of the barrier are equalised, the barrier is raised at 7.50m AOD.

Castle Mills Lock is 34 metres long and 6 metres wide. There are mooring points in the lock basin on the Ouse side and overnight mooring on the Foss is prohibited. Beyond Rowntree Wharf there are few opportunities for turning.

== History ==
In 1069 William the Conqueror dammed the Foss just south of York Castle, close to its confluence with the Ouse creating a moat around the castle. It caused the river to flood further upstream in what is now the Hungate and Layerthorpe areas, forming a large lake that was known as the "King's Pool" or the "King's Fish Pond" and which provided fish for the markets. The lake was approximately 100 acres in extent and fishing was allowed by licence, except for the King's Men.

The King's Pool was part of the city's inner defences during the Middle Ages as the marsh was virtually impassable and explains why there is no city wall between Layerthorpe Postern and the Red Tower.

In the 17th century, the King's Pool and the Foss were in decline because silt from upriver collected in the Pool, and not enough water came down to move it on despite the main channel of the River Foss having been deepened in 1608. Eventually the lake was too shallow to remain viable as a defence. In 1644 the lake was shallow enough for Parliamentarian forces under Sir Thomas Fairfax to consider crossing it on foot to break the Siege of York during the English Civil War.

Foss Navigation Act 1793
- Act of Parliament
- Parliament of Great Britain
- Long title: An Act for making and maintaining a Navigable Communication from the Junction of the River Foss with the River Ouse, at or near the City of York, to Stillington Mill, in the Parish of Stillington, in the North Riding of the County of York; and for draining and improving certain Low Lands, lying on each Side of the said River Foss.
- Citation: 33 Geo. 3. c. 99
- Territorial extent: Great Britain

Dates
- Royal assent: 30 April 1793
- Commencement: 30 April 1793 (Note: The Acts of Parliament (Commencement) Act 1793.)
Other legislation
Amended by	Foss Navigation and Drainage Act 1801; York Improvement (Foss Abandonment) Act 1859

Status: Amended

Text of statute as originally enacted

Foss Navigation and Drainage Act 1801
- Act of Parliament
- Parliament of the United Kingdom
- Long title: An Act to explain and amend an Act passed in the Thirty third Year of the Reign of His present Majesty, intituled, "An Act for making and maintaining a Navigable Communication from the Junction of the River Foss with the River Ouse, at or near the City of York, to Stillington Mill, in the Parish of Stillington, in the North Riding of the County of York, and for draining and improving certain Low Lands, lying on each Side of the said River Foss," so far as the said Act relates to the said Navigation, and for enabling the Company of Proprietors of the said Navigation to complete the same.
- Citation: 41 Geo. 3. (U.K.) c. cxv
- Territorial extent: United Kingdom

Dates
- Royal assent: 23 June 1801
- Commencement: 23 June 1801
Other legislation
Amends	Foss Navigation Act 1793
Amended by	York Drainage and Sanitary Improvement Act 1853; York Improvement (Foss Abandonment) Act 1859; Yorkshire Water Authority Act 1986

Status: Amended

Text of statute as originally enacted

In 1727 an order was placed upon Arthur Ingram, 6th Viscount of Irvine to scour the River Foss from the Castle Mills to Foss Bridge, making it eight yards wide at the top and four yards at the bottom, and, in 1731 the Little Foss, the extension to enclose the castle was drained. In the 18th century, the water was so low that marshy islands were created (hence the modern name Foss Islands). Citizens used the river as a rubbish tip which became a health hazard. The Foss Navigation Act 1793 (33 Geo. 3. c. 99) and the Foss Navigation and Drainage Act 1801 (41 Geo. 3. (U.K.) c. cxv) were enacted to make the Foss navigable and saw the end of the King's Pool. The Foss Navigation Company canalised the river from 1778, to make it navigable as far as Sheriff Hutton.

York Drainage and Sanitary Improvement Act 1853 (Note: Section 1.)
- Act of Parliament
- Parliament of the United Kingdom
- Long title: An Act to enable the Mayor, Aldermen, and Citizens of the City of York to purchase the Undertaking of the Foss Navigation Company, and to execute Works for the sanitary Improvement of the said City; to alter the Tolls taken in the Cattle Markets and Fairs of the City, and for other Purposes.
- Citation: 16 & 17 Vict. c. lvi
- Territorial extent: United Kingdom

Dates
- Royal assent: 28 June 1853
- Commencement: 28 June 1853
Other legislation
Amended by	York Improvement (Foss Abandonment) Act 1859; Local Government Board's Provisional Orders Confirmation (No. 9) Act 1882; York Extension and Improvement Act 1884

Status: Amended

Text of statute as originally enacted

York Improvement (Foss Abandonment) Act 1859
- Act of Parliament
- Parliament of the United Kingdom
- Long title: An Act to authorize the Abandonment of the Foss Navigation from a Point about Two hundred Yards above the York Union Workhouse near the City of York; to alter, repeal, and amend the Acts relating to the said Navigation; and for other Purposes.
- Citation: 22 Vict. c. xix
- Territorial extent: United Kingdom

Dates
- Royal assent: 19 April 1859
- Commencement: 19 April 1859
Other legislation
Amends	Foss Navigation Act 1793; Foss Navigation and Drainage Act 1801; York Drainage and Sanitary Improvement Act 1853

Status: Current legislation

The York Drainage and Sanitary Improvement Act 1853 (16 & 17 Vict. c. lvi) saw York Corporation purchase the River Foss from the Foss Navigation Company. The York Improvement (Foss Abandonment) Act 1859 (22 Vict. c. xix) allowed the river above Yearsley Bridge to be abandoned as a navigable waterway.

Stillington Hall was a mansion on the west side of the Foss and adjoining the village of the same name. It was the home of the Croft family, who are descended from a common ancestor with the house of Croft, of Croft Castle in Herefordshire.

== Economy ==
Remains of Roman jetties, wharves and warehouses have been found by excavations and building works on the banks of the Foss, suggesting that water-borne transport and trade were important from early in the history of the city.

The modern Foss benefits most from leisure activity and several long-distance walks cross its path. The Foss Walk follows much of the river course from Blue Bridge to Oulston Reservoir and on to Easingwold, a distance of 28 miles (45 km). Part of the Howardian Way near Yearsley and both the Ebor Way and Centenary Way as far as West Lilling also follow the Foss for part of their way.

== Ecology ==
Several species of fish are found in the river, such as Pike, Dace, Chub, Gudgeon, Perch and Roach. At the start of the century, Barbel have been introduced into the river.

== River Foss Barrier ==
Flooding of the River Ouse occurs periodically in York. This is part of a series of schemes designed by the Yorkshire Water Authority.

The River Foss is a left bank tributary of the River Ouse, situated near the York Castle.

In the years 1947, 1978, 1982 and end of 2015 flooding occurred causing many areas to be under water.

In 1982, a feasibility study was undertaken that indicated flood levels in the Foss are directly related to River Ouse levels.

A barrier was proposed to counteract the backwash of the Ouse into the River Foss. In 2016 funds were allocated to upgrade the existing facilities to improve the pumping capacity.

== Lists ==
Source for this section comes from the Ordnance Survey Open Source Mapping

=== Tributaries ===
There are many small streams that feed into the Foss north of York. The main ones are:

- Eller's Beck, North-west of Crayke.
- Brandsby Beck, South-west of Crayke
- Farlington Beck, south of Farlington
- Whitecarr Beck, near Sherriff Hutton Bridge
- Howl Beck, near Sherriff Hutton Bridge
- Black Dike near Strensall
- Westfield Beck in New Earswick

=== Settlements ===
North to south, to the confluence with the Ouse, these are:

- Stillington
- Strensall
- Haxby
- Earswick Village
- York

=== Bridges over the Foss ===
North to south, to the confluence with the Ouse, these are:

- Road Bridge on Milking Hill near Yearsley.
- Mill Green Bridge on Brandsby Road near Crayke.
- Road Bridge on B1363 near Marton Abbey.
- White Bridge, footbridge near Marton Abbey.
- Road Bridge on Mill Lane near Stillington.
- Foss Bridge on unnamed Road near Farlington.
- Road Bridge on unnamed Road near West Lilling.
- Road Bridge on Sherriff Hutton Road near West Lilling.
- Road Bridge on Ings Lane near West Lilling.
- Road Bridge on The Village in Strensall.
- Road Bridge on Haxby Moor Road in Strensall.
- Railway Bridge on York to Scarborough Line near Strensall.
- Road Bridge on Towthorpe Road near Strensall.
- Pedestrian bridge at Earswick Village.
- A1237 York Outer Ring Road.
- Church Lane Bridge, Huntington.
- Link Road Bridge between New Earswick and Huntington.
- Footbridge from Huntington Road.
- Yearsley Bridge on Huntington Road.
- Fossway Bridge.
- Pedestrian and cycle path bridge, formerly part of the Foss Islands Branch Line of the North Eastern Railway, built around 1880.
- Monk Bridge built in 1794, widened in the 1930s.
- Foss Bank Bridge, rebuilt in 1998, now carries South-east bound Inner Ring Road traffic.
- Layerthorpe Bridge, re-built in 1998, now carries North-west bound Inner Ring Road traffic and traffic between Peasholme Green and Layerthorpe.
- Pedestrian bridge from Foss Islands Road to what is now the DEFRA site at Peasholme Green, built in 1931.
- Pedestrian bridge from Navigation Road to the Hungate area and Peasholme Green, built in 2011.
- Pedestrian bridge linking the Shambles car-park and Rowntree Wharf, built in 1990.
- Foss Bridge, built between 1811 and 1812.
- Piccadilly Bridge, built between 1911 and 1914.
- Castle Mills Bridge, built in 1956, and forms part of York's Inner Ring Road.
- The Blue Bridge, built in 1929–30.

== Gallery ==
Along the River Foss: source to confluence
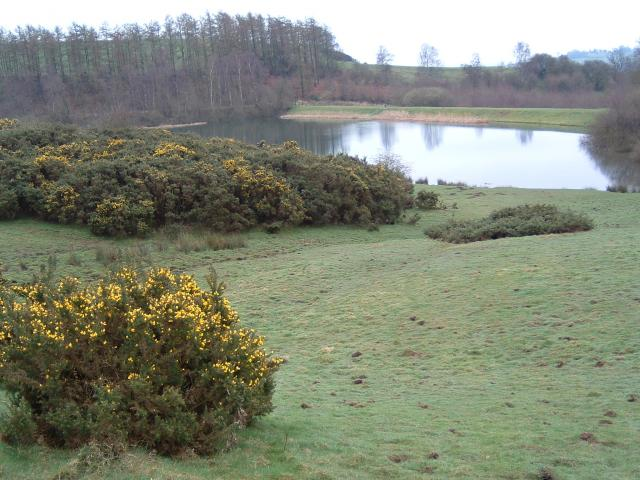
Oulston Reservoir near source of River Foss
54.163205°N 1.136180°W

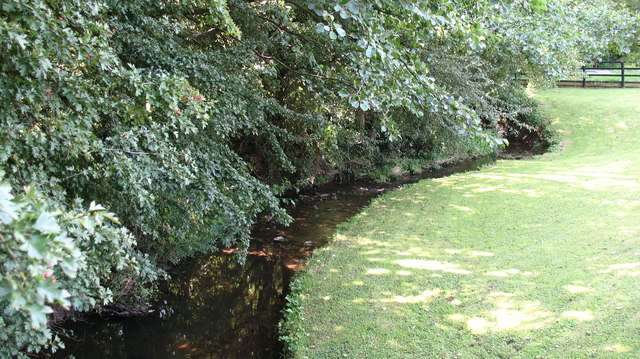
River Foss near Crayke 2 miles from its source
54°8′16.55″N 1°8′1.12″W

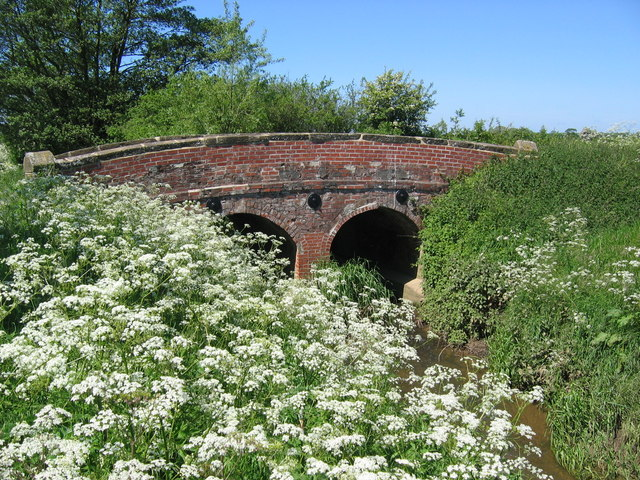
Bridge over the River Foss near Farlington
54.086257°N 1.075253°W

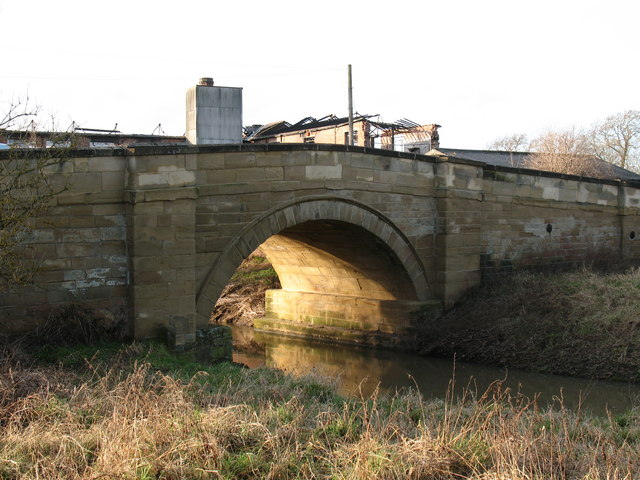
Bridge over River Foss in Strensall on road heading to Sherriff Hutton
54.040824°N 1.034267°W

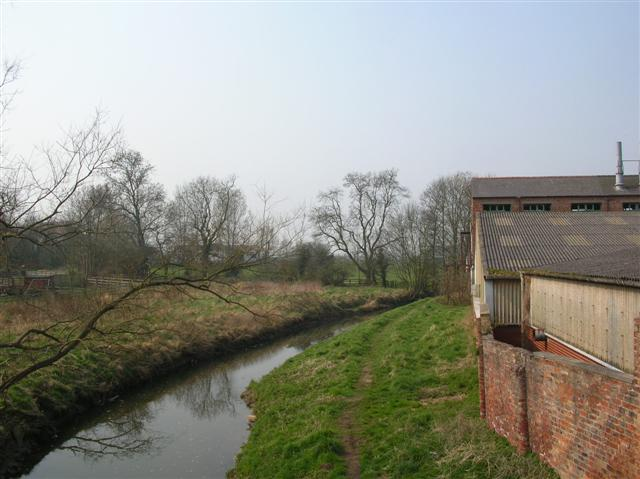
River Foss in Strensall as seen from the Post Office
54.040923°N 1.035334°W

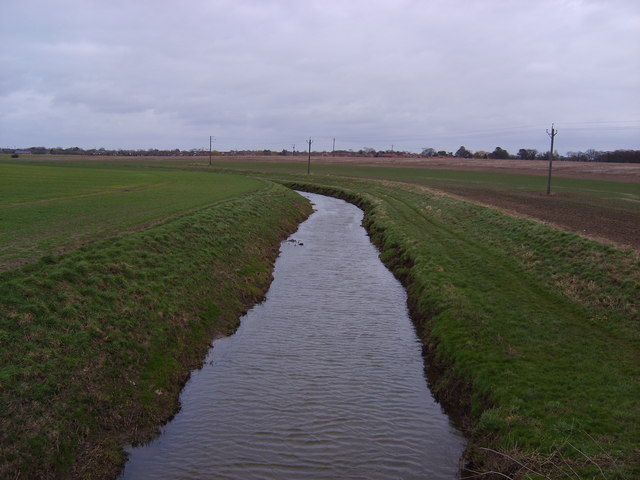
River Foss viewed from Towthorpe Bridge towards Strensall
54.024888°N 1.053412°W

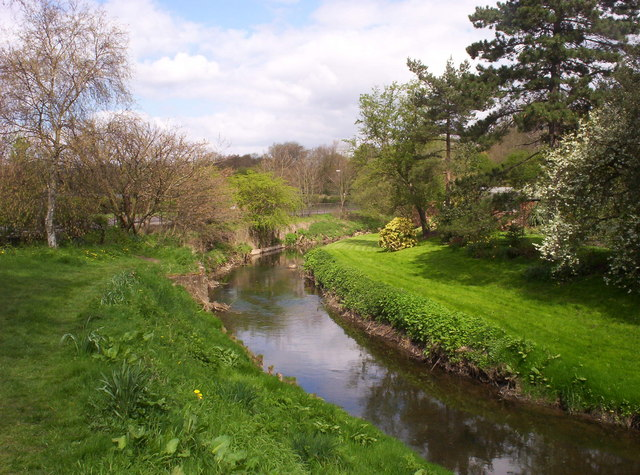
River Foss New Earswick
53.983022°N 1.078913°W

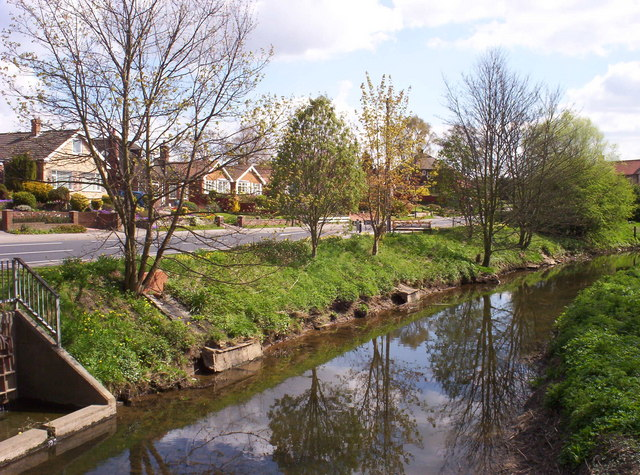
River Foss Huntington Road, York
53.982905°N 1.063667°W

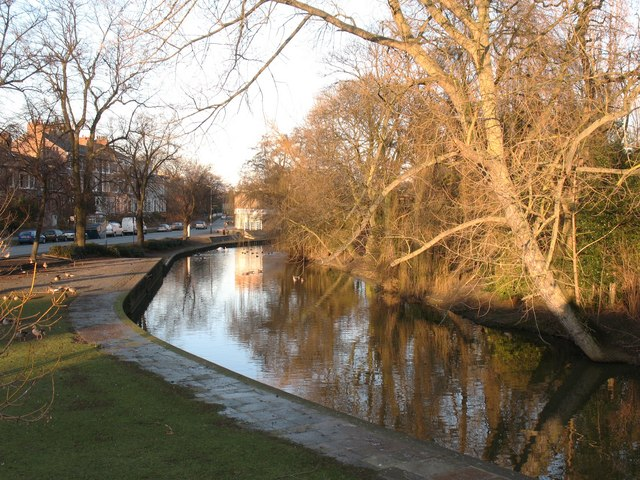
River Foss from Monk Bridge
53.965901°N 1.073194°W

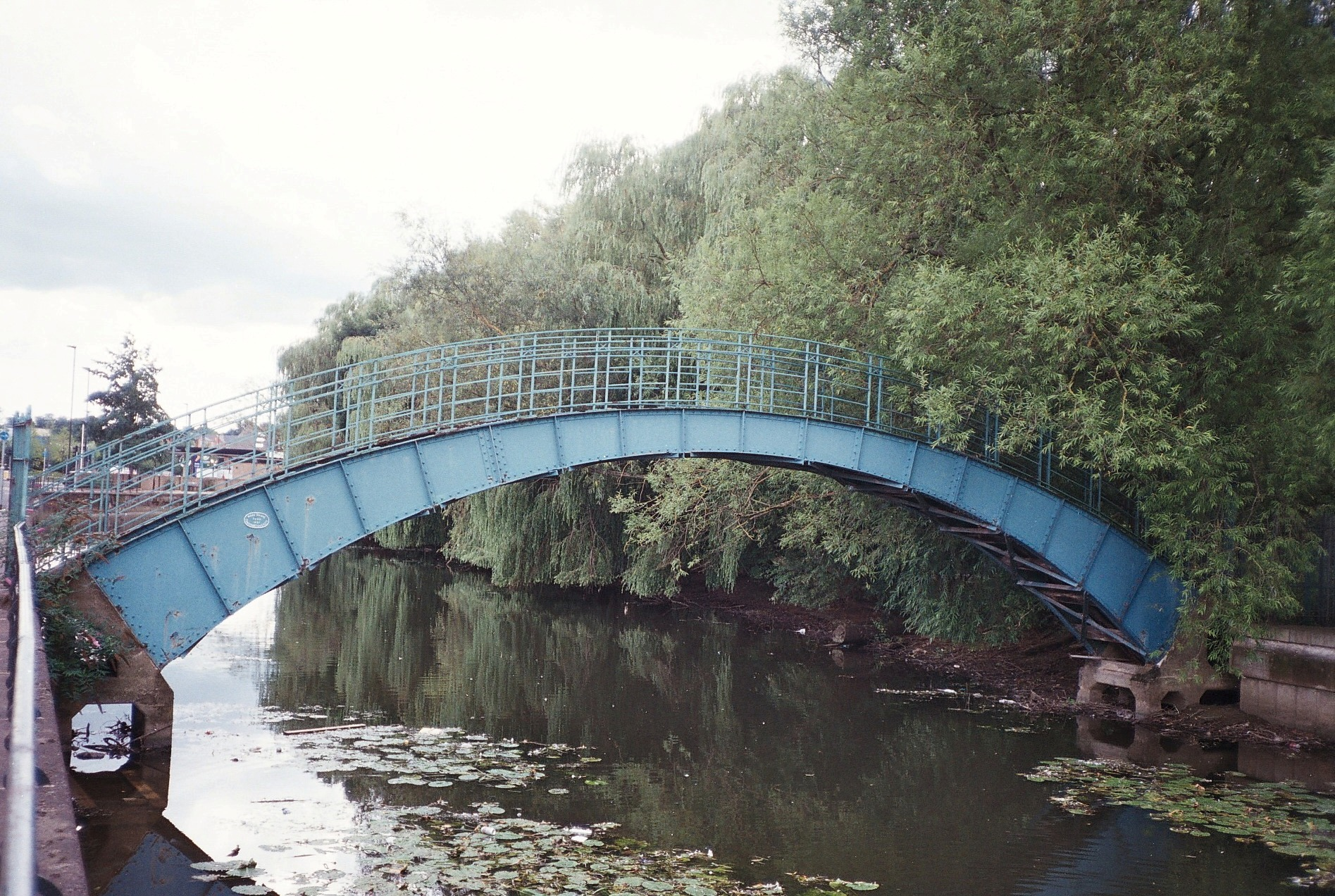
Pedestrian bridge from the west, looking downstream near DEFRA buildings
53.960272°N 1.072903°W

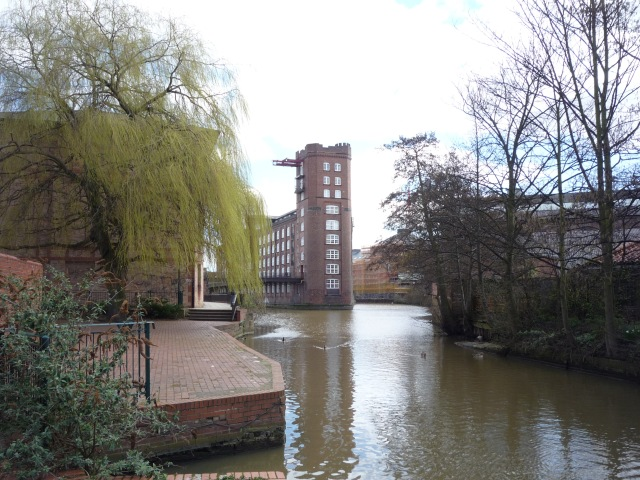
Looking upstream from Foss Bridge to Rowntree Wharf, with Wormald's Cut to the right.
53.957975°N 1.07725°W

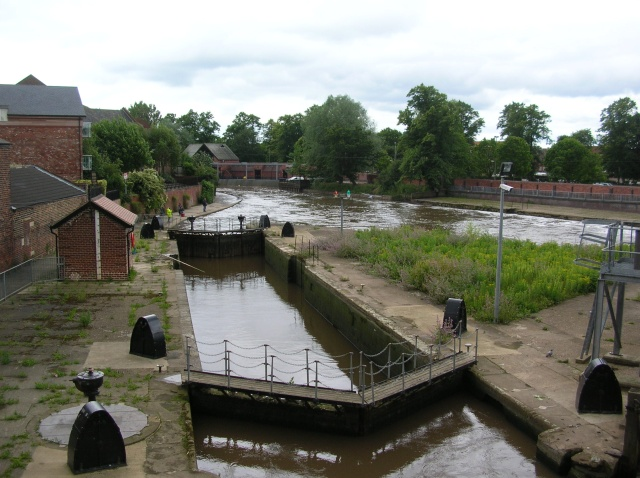
Castle Mills Lock and Basin, near the Foss Barrier and the confluence with River Ouse
53.954078°N 1.077944°W

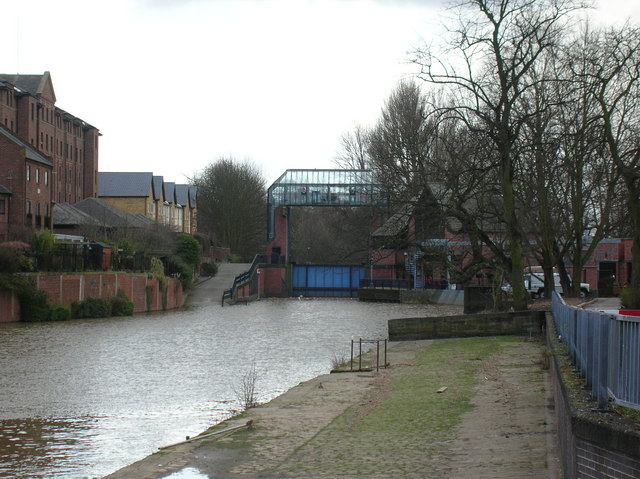
The River Foss Barrier (closed), viewed from the north (Castle Mills Basin)
53.95295°N 1.078769°W

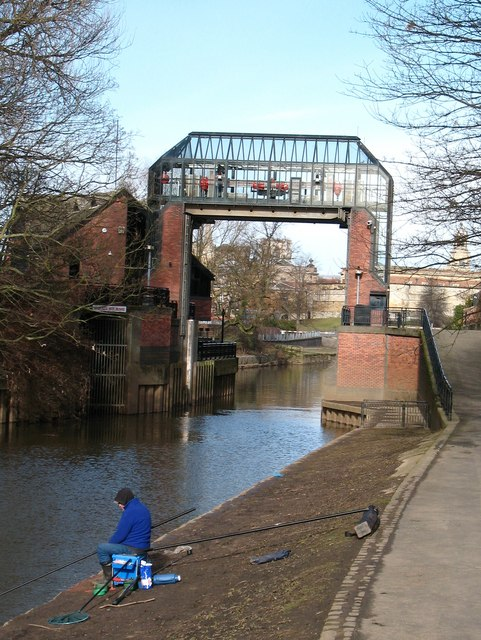
The River Foss Barrier (open), viewed from the south
53.952342°N 1.078394°W

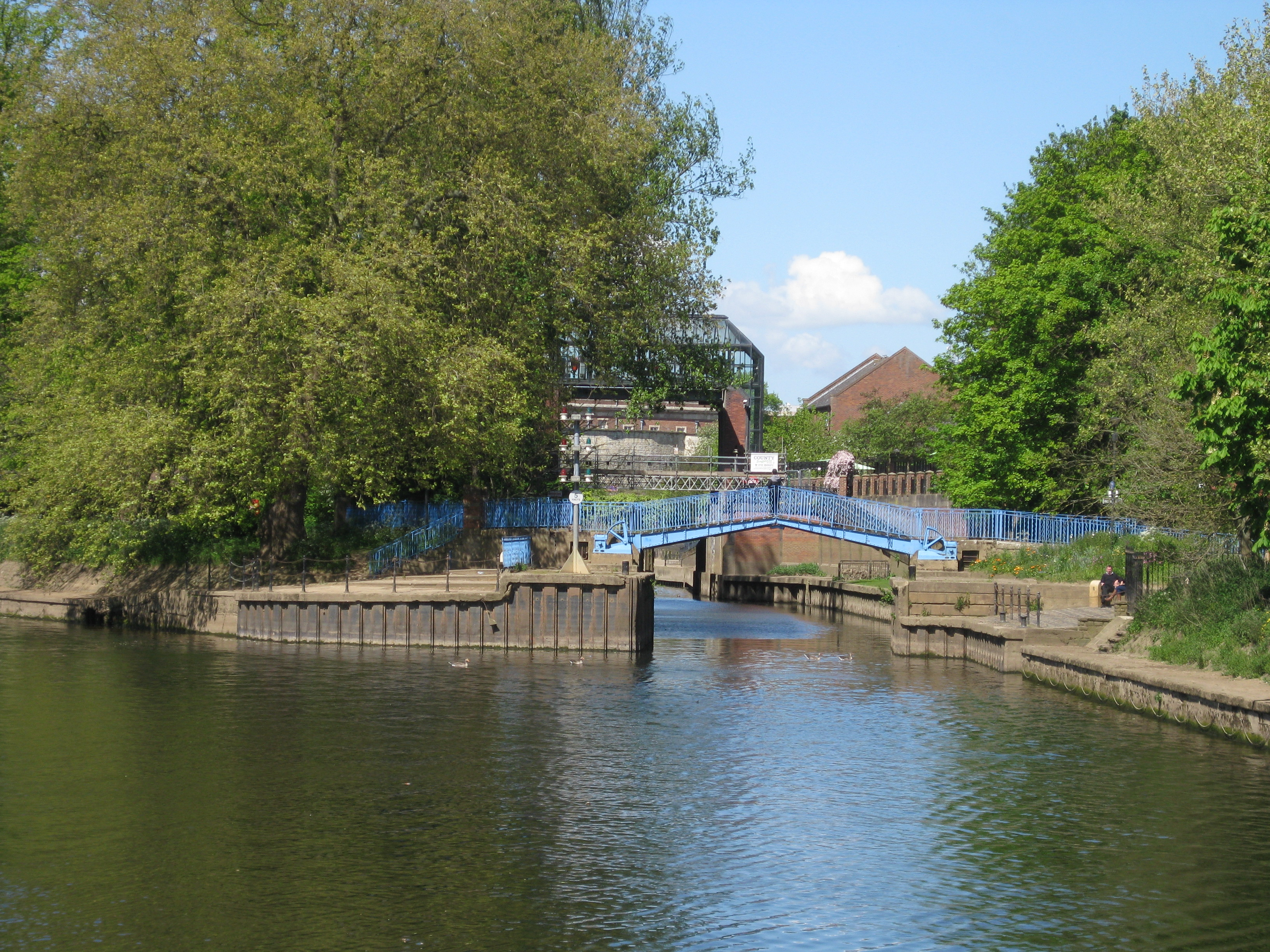
View from the River Ouse of the confluence and the "Blue Bridge"

== Bibliography ==
- Evans, Antonia, ed. (2002). The York Book. York: Blue Bridge. ISBN 0-9542749-0-3.
