= Thomas Santon =

Thomas Santon (fl. 1413–1417), was an English Member of Parliament (MP).

He was a Member of the Parliament of England for City of York in May 1413 and 1417. He was Mayor of York 3 February 1414–15.
