= Yorkshire Hussar =

Listed former pub in York, England

- The building in 2026
- Former names: Yorkshire Tavern; Tap and Spile; First Hussar
- Alternative names: Whippet Inn

General information
- Status: Converted to restaurant use
- Type: Public house (former)
- Location: 15 North Street, York, England
- Coordinates: 53.9582°N 1.0856°W
- Year built: 1896; 130 years ago

Design and construction
- Architect: Walter Green Penty
- Designations

Listed Building – Grade II
- Official name: The Other Tap and Spile public house
- Designated: 14 March 1997
- Reference no.: 1257062

Website
- thewhippetinn.co.uk

The Yorkshire Hussar is a Grade II listed former public house on North Street in York, England. A pub on the site was known as the Yorkshire Hussar from around 1840, and the present building, constructed in 1896 to designs by Walter Green Penty, continued to use that name until about 1980. It later traded under several other names, including the Yorkshire Tavern and the Tap and Spile, before returning to Yorkshire Hussar and, since 2013, has operated as the Whippet Inn steakhouse restaurant.

== History ==
A public house on this site was known as the Yorkshire Hussar from around 1840 until about 1980. The present structure, built in 1896 to designs by Walter Green Penty, opened under the same name and later traded as the Yorkshire Tavern. In 1968 the site was included within the newly established Central Historic Core conservation area. According to an anecdotal source, the pub adopted the Tap and Spile name in 1990. When the building was designated a Grade II listed structure in March 1997, English Heritage recorded it under the name The Other Tap and Spile, a title to distinguish it from the Tap and Spile on Monkgate, also designed by Penty and listed in 1983. This label was used only for the listing and was not the pub's trading name. Several secondary sources repeat "Other" because they follow the wording of the listing entry, whereas the Campaign for Real Ale records that it previously traded simply as the Tap and Spile. In 1997 it adopted the name the First Hussar, later returning to Yorkshire Hussar, and closed as a pub before becoming the Whippet Inn steakhouse restaurant in 2013. As of June 2026, the freehold is independently owned.

== Architecture ==
The building is of red brick, with the basement painted, and has painted stone details. The roof is tiled and the gables have stone copings. It has a basement and two main floors, with some bays rising into the attic. The four bays are marked above basement level by tall, narrow pilasters with shaped heads. The attic over the bay left of centre has a curved gable, and the right‑hand bay has a shaped parapet; both have moulded copings.

The entrance is in the basement of the bay left of centre, with double doors made of four‑panelled leaves set beneath a flat canopy supported on fluted brackets. To the right are boarded cellar doors. At the far right is a tall, elliptical carriage arch, now closed by boarded double gates that rise in height towards the centre.

The carriage entrance in 2023

On the ground floor, a three‑light window above the entrance lights the internal staircase, and it is flanked by two three‑light mullioned and transomed windows. A similar three‑light window stands above the carriage arch on the first floor; the other first‑floor windows have two lights. All windows are small‑pane casements set back beneath shallow arched heads. On the ground floor, the bases of the pilasters extend sideways to form a continuous sill band, and on the first floor a moulded band at pilaster‑head level acts as the sill band for the windows. In the attic, the tops of the pilasters are linked by a flat band, which carries the date 1896 above the bay left of centre.

== See also ==
- Listed buildings in York (within the city walls, southern part)
