= Joseph Clayton =

English journalist and biographer (1868 - 1943)

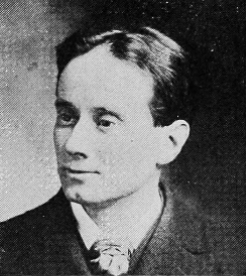
- Born: 28 April 1868; London, England
- Died: November 1943 (aged 75); Chipping Campden, England
- Education: Worcester College, Oxford
- Occupations: Journalist, writer
- Political party: Independent Labour

Joseph Clayton FRHistS (1868–1943) was an English freelance journalist and biographer. A writer of numerous books, he covered areas of trade union and socialist history, but also religious figures and history.

== Life ==
Joseph Clayton was born in London 28 April 1868 and attended the North London Collegiate School. He was a Christian socialist as an undergraduate at Worcester College, Oxford, where he was a classmate of Richard Runciman Terry. He became an organiser of the Independent Labour Party (ILP), and supported socialist causes. In 1896 he was an ILP member in Leeds.

He edited The New Age in 1907, successor to Arthur Compton-Rickett, before it was sold to a group backing A. R. Orage and Holbrook Jackson; Clayton knew Orage from the ILP. He was a convert to Roman Catholicism in 1910, and was an organist at Westminster Cathedral. He was a Fellow of the Royal Historical Society.

Clayton was a contributor to the National Review, The Athenaeum, The Universe, The Bookman, and the Catholic Encyclopedia. He also wrote in support of women's suffrage.

He died at Chipping Campden in November 1943.

== Works ==
- Father Dolling (1902) on Robert William Radclyffe Dolling
- Grace Marlow (1903) novel
- John Blankset's Business (1904) novel
- Bishop Westcott (1906)
- The Bishops as Legislators (1906)
- The Truth About the Lords: Our New Nobility, 1857–1907 (1907)
- Robert Owen, Pioneer of Social Reforms (1908)
- Wat Tyler and the Peasant Revolt (1909)
- The True Story of Jack Cade (1910)
- Leaders of the People: Studies in Democratic History (1910)
- The Rise of the Democracy (1911)
- Robert Kett and the Norfolk Rising (1912)
- Co-operation and the Trade Unions (1912)
- Father Stanton of St Albans, Holborn (1913)
- Trade Unions (1913)
- Economics For Christians (1924)
- The Historic Basis of Anglicanism: A Short Survey of the Foundations of the Anglican Communion (1925)
- The Rise and Decline of Socialism in Great Britain, 1884–1924 (1926)
- Continuity in the Church of England (1928)
- St Hugh of Lincoln (1931)
- Sir Thomas More: A Short Study (1933)
- The Protestant Reformation in Great Britain (1934)
- Pope Innocent III and His Times (1941)
