= Penty (surname) =

Penty is a surname derived from the old english words "Pent" meaning "enclosure" and "eye" meaning "island". Notable people with the surname include:

- Arthur Penty (1875–1937), British architect
- Diana Penty (born 1985), Indian actress
- Richard Penty (born 1964), British engineer
- Toby Penty (born 1992), British badminton player
- Walter Green Penty (1852–1902), British architect
