= Samuel George Hobson =

S. G. Hobson
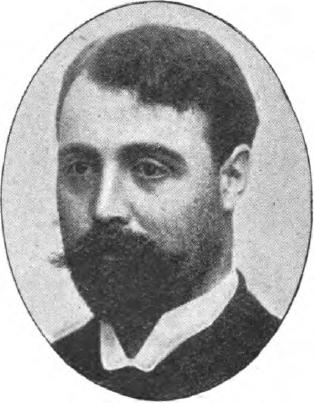
- Born: Samuel George Hobson; 4 February 1870; Bessbrook, County Armagh, United Kingdom of Great Britain and Ireland
- Died: 4 January 1940 (aged 69); Dunstable, Bedfordshire, England
- Political party: ILP (1893-1905)

Academic work
- Discipline: Economics; political studies
- Sub-discipline: Co-operative economics; political theory
- School or tradition: Guild socialism
- Notable works: National Guilds: an Inquiry into the Wage System and a Way Out

Samuel George Hobson, often known as S. G. Hobson (4 February 1870 – 4 January 1940), was an Anglo-Irish writer and socialist, perhaps best known as a theorist of guild socialism.

== Biography ==
Born in Bessbrook, County Armagh, Hobson was given a Quaker education in Saffron Walden and then Sidcot, Somerset. Moving to Cardiff, he became an active socialist, joining first the Fabian Society and then becoming a founder member of the Independent Labour Party (ILP). He began writing for the ILP newspaper, Labour Leader, and in 1900 was elected to the Fabian Society's executive.

Hobson stood for the ILP in the 1895 general election at Bristol East, becoming a member of the Bristol Socialist Society for some years. In the 1906, he stood as an "independent Labour" candidate in Rochdale. By this point, he was keen to go beyond the Labour Party's Parliamentary activity and create an actual socialist society.

From 1906, Hobson developed a theory of a socialism based on guilds, a form of workers' self-management inspired by Mediaeval forms of organisation. He left the Fabians in 1910 and soon began writing for Alfred Richard Orage's magazine, The New Age. He coined the term "guild socialism," and in 1914, his writing for the publication was compiled as National Guilds: an Inquiry into the Wage System and a Way Out. He helped found the National Guilds League, but following disagreements with G. D. H. Cole over strategy, and The New Age's move to supporting social credit, he ceased theoretical work.

Throughout this period, Hobson had been involved in various profitable activities, managing a banana plantation and editing an investment journal. Eventually, he attempted to organise a builders' guild, but this was not a success.

Hobson wrote a memoir entitled "Pilgrim to the Left - Memoirs of a Modern Revolutionist" which was published by Longmans, Green & Co. in 1938.
