= Elmbank Hotel =

Listed building in York, England

- The building in 2024
- Interactive map of the Elmbank Hotel area
- Alternative names: Elm Bank Hotel

General information
- Location: The Mount, York, England
- Coordinates: 53°57′04″N 1°05′55″W
- Completed: c. 1870
- Renovated: 1898 (remodelled); 20th century (altered)

Technical details
- Floor count: 2

Design and construction
- Architects: J. B. and W. Atkinson (possible); Walter and Arthur Penty (1898)
- Designations

Listed Building – Grade II*
- Official name: Elm Bank Hotel
- Designated: 1 July 1968
- Reference no.: 1256439

Website
- Official website

The Elmbank Hotel is a historic building southwest of the city centre of York, in England.

The building lies on the north-west side of The Mount. It was built in about 1870, perhaps to a design by J. B. and W. Atkinson, who extended it in 1874. It was remodelled in 1898 for Sidney Leetham, by Walter and Arthur Penty, with the interiors redesigned by George Henry Walton. Nikolaus Pevsner describes it as having an "unexceptional exterior but memorable interiors", and Historic England states that it has "one of the finest and most complete surviving [Art Nouveau] interiors in England". The building was Grade II* listed in 1968, by which time it had been converted into a hotel. It was purchased by Hilton and refurbished in 2024.

The hotel is built of white brick with stone dressings, slate roofs and a lead roof to the tower. Its main entrance is through a Doric porch facing Love Lane, and both it and the front to The Mount are five bays wide; that to The Mount has a central bow window with a balcony above. It has two storeys, with a four-storey tower at the rear. Inside, the hall with the main staircase and major ground floor rooms are all panelled, with the walls and ceilings painted and stencilled in a broadly Pre-Raphaelite style. The hall has two storeys and a barrel-vaulted ceiling, with the original light fitting. One room has a marble overmantel with glass and ceramic inlaid, and many windows retain original stained glass.

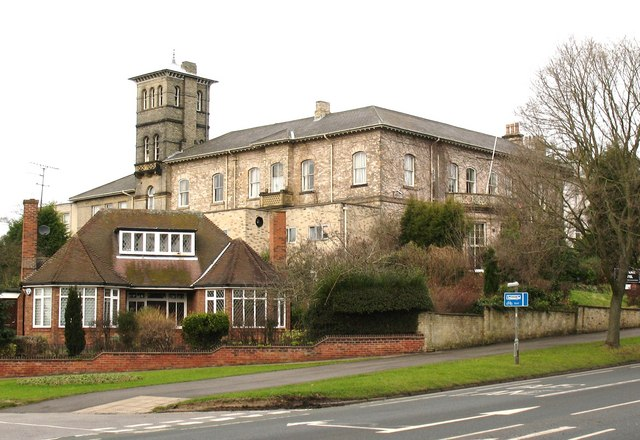
View from the south in 2008

== See also ==
- Grade II* listed buildings in the City of York
- Listed buildings in York (outside the city walls, southern part)
