= Arthur Compton-Rickett =

English author and historian

Arthur Compton-Rickett (born Arthur Rickett; 20 February 1869 – 8 September 1937) was a lawyer, author, literary historian, and editor.

== Biography ==
Born in Canonbury, London, with the surname Rickett, he assumed the surname Compton-Rickett in 1908 when his father, Sir Joseph Compton-Rickett assumed the additional surname of Compton. Arthur Compton-Rickett, who had nine siblings, was the eldest of the four sons who were alive in the years from 1901 to 1919.

Arthur Rickett attended secondary school at Eastbourne College and at University School, Hastings, before matriculating at Christ's College, Cambridge in 1889. He graduated from Cambridge University with B.A. in 1892, LL.B. in 1894, M.A. in 1896, and LL.D. in 1905. On 27 January 1898 he was called to the bar at Inner Temple. In 1900 he became a lecturer in English literature and history for the Extension Board of the University of London, as well as the London County Council. In 1910 he became an Extension Lecturer for the University of Oxford.

He was the general editor of the book series Fireside Library published from 1924 to 1928 by Herbert Jenkins Ltd. He published essays, plays, and several books. Upon his death in 1937 his papers were left to Ella Mary Cressee (1885–1959).

== Editor of The New Age ==
For part of the 1st decade of the 20th century, Arthur Rickett was the editor-in-chief of the British weekly magazine The New Age.

The New Age had had a varied history as an independent weekly. It was founded in 1894 by Frederick A. Atkins, who pursued a policy of Christian liberalism and was not unfavourably disposed towards Socialism. The contributors included Richard Le Gallienne, Israel Zangwill, and Jerome K. Jerome. After A. E. Fletcher became the editor in 1895, the subtitle was changed from ‘A Weekly Record of Culture, Social Service, and Literary Life’ to ‘A Journal for Thinkers and Workers’. Ramsay MacDonald was a regular contributor during this socialist phase of the magazine’s history. Fletcher was succeeded by Arthur Compton-Rickett,... who in turn was followed by Joseph Clayton. By 1900, the magazine was again independent, though its sympathies were clearly Liberal. Between 1900 and 1907, the circulation declined, and it became so deeply in debt to the printer at the end of this period that it had to be sold.

== Selected publications ==
- Lost Chords: Some Emotions Without Morals. A.D. Innes. 1895.
- as editor: Prophets of the Century: Essays. Ward Lock. 1898.
- as editor: Mimes and Rhymes. R.B. Johnson. 1901. 1901
- The Vagabond in Literature: By Arthur Rickett. With six portraits. J.M. Dent & Company. 1906.
- Personal Forces in Modern Literature. J.M. Dent & Company. 1906. ISBN 9780404016494.
- The London Life of Yesterday. E.P. Dutton. 1909.
- A History of English Literature. T.C. & E.C. Jack. 1912.
- William Morris: A Study in Personality. Herbert Jenkins. 1913.
- with Thomas Hake: The Life and Letters of Theodore Watts-Dunton. Vol. I. T.C. & E.C. Jack. 1916. Hake, Thomas; Compton-Rickett, Arthur (1916). The Life and Letters. Vol. II.
- as editor with Thomas Hake: The Letters of Algernon Charles Swinburne: With Some Personal Recollections. J. Murray. 1918.
- Our Poets at School and Other Fancies in Prose and Verse. E. Cooper. 1921.
- Robert Browning. Jenkins. 1924.
- A Primer of English Literature. Thomas Nelson & Sons. 1925.
- I Look Back: Memories of Fifty Years. H. Jenkins, limited. 1933.
- Portraits and Personalities. Selwyn & Blount. 1937.
- with Ernest Henry Short: Ring up the Curtain: Being a Pageant of English Entertainment Covering Half a Century. Jenkins. 1938.
