= Arthur Penty =

British architect (1875–1937)

Arthur Joseph Penty (17 March 1875 – 1937) was an English architect and writer on guild socialism and distributism. He was first a Fabian socialist, and follower of Victorian thinkers William Morris and John Ruskin. He is generally credited with the formulation of a Christian socialist form of the medieval guild, as an alternative basis for economic life.

Penty was the elder of the two architect sons of Walter Green Penty of York, designer of the York Institute of Art, Science and Literature. While a pupil and assistant with his father, Penty absorbed the spirit of the Arts and Crafts Movement and the progressive movement in Glasgow.

== Early life ==
Arthur Penty was born at 16 Elmwood Street, in the parish of St Lawrence, York, the second son of Walter Green Penty (1852–1902), architect, and his wife, Emma Seller. After attending St Peter's School in York he was apprenticed in 1888 to his father.

== Architect in York ==
When, in the 1890s, Penty joined his father's architectural practice, now renamed as Penty & Penty, "a marked improvement in the quality and originality of the firm's work" ensued. Among surviving buildings by Walter and Arthur Penty are:

- 1894: The Bay Horse, a public house in Marygate.
- 1895-6: Rowntree Wharf on the River Foss, originally a flour warehouse for Leetham's Mill, which burnt down in 1931, now flats and offices.
- 1899: Terry Memorial almshouses in Skeldergate.
- 1900–02: Buildings in River Street, Colenso Street and Lower Darnborough Street in the Clementhorpe area south of the River Ouse.

He attracted national and even international attention, including favourable notice in Herman Muthesius's Das englische Haus (1904).

His younger brother, Frederick T. Penty (1879–1943) took over the business after their father died. Arthur's other younger brother, George Victor Penty (1885–1967), emigrated to Australia to pursue a career in the wool industry.

== Move to London ==
Around 1900 Penty had met A. R. Orage; together with Holbrook Jackson they founded the Leeds Arts Club. Penty left his father's office in 1901, and moved to London in 1902 to pursue his interest in the arts and crafts movement. Orage and Jackson followed in 1905 and 1906; Penty in fact led the way, and Orage lodged with him in his first attempts to live by writing. There is a plaque on a house on the Thames riverside in Old Isleworth (near Syon Park) commemorating his residence there.

== Influence ==
For a time, from 1906, Penty's ideas were widely influential. Orage, as editor of The New Age, was a convert to guild socialism. After World War I guild socialism dropped back as a factor in the thinking of the British Labour movement, in general; the idea of post-industrialism, on which Penty wrote, attributing the term to A. K. Coomaraswamy, receded in importance in the face of the economic conditions. Several of Penty's books were translated into German in the early 1920s. Penty was an acknowledged influence on the writings of Spain's Ramiro de Maeztu (1875–1936), who was murdered by Communists in the early days of the Spanish Civil War.

== Distributism ==
The somewhat complex British development of distributism emerged as a conjuncture of ideas of Penty, Hilaire Belloc and the Chestertons, Cecil and Gilbert. It reflected in part a first split from the Fabian socialists of the whole New Age group, in the form of the Fabian Arts Group of 1907.

Orage was a believer in Guild socialism for a period. After C. H. Douglas met Orage in 1918, and Orage invented the term Social Credit for the Douglas theories, there was in effect a further split into 'left' (Social Crediters) and 'right' (distributist) thinkers. This is, though, fairly misleading as a classification; it was also to some extent a split between theosophist and Catholic camps. Penty associated with the Catholic Ditchling Community.

By a curious coincidence the arrival of Douglas reproduced for a moment the old trio of Jackson, Orage and Penty, who ten years before had come from Leeds to London to launch the Fabian Arts Group. Jackson soon dropped away after introducing Douglas to Orage; but Penty [...] engaged in a long struggle with this rival, Douglas, to recapture the interest of Orage.[...] The hold of Penty over Orage was finally broken, and the architect was left to ponder his theories alone, ending in the thirties as Pound was to end in forties, an admirer of Mussolini.

Penty went with the distributists. Distributism in the 1920s took its own direction, as Belloc wrote his version of it in the period 1920 to 1925 and connected it with his political theories. The British Labour Party declared against Social Credit in 1922.

== Works ==
- The Restoration of the Gild System, Swan Sonnenschein and Co., 1906.
  - "The Restoration of the Guild System," The New Age, Vol. XIII, No. 14, 1913.
  - "The Restoration of the Guild System II," The New Age, Vol. XIII, No. 15, 1913.
  - "The Restoration of the Guild System III," The New Age, Vol. XIII, No. 16, 1913.
  - "The Restoration of the Guild System IV," The New Age, Vol. XIII, No. 17, 1913.
  - "The Restoration of the Guild System V," The New Age, Vol. XIII, No. 18, 1913.
  - "The Restoration of the Guild System VI," The New Age, Vol. XIII, No. 19, 1913.
  - "The Restoration of the Guild System VII," The New Age, Vol. XIII, No. 20, 1913.
- "The Peril of Large Organisations," The New Age, Vol. X, No. 13, 1912.
- "Art as a Factor in Social Reform," The New Age, Vol. XIV, No. 13, 1914.
- "Art and National Guilds," The New Age, Vol. XIV, No. 16, 1914.
- "Art and Revolution," The New Age, Vol. XIV, No. 20, 1914.
- "Guilds and Versatility," The New Age, Vol. XIV, No. 21, 1914.
- "Aestheticism and History," The New Age, Vol. XIV, No. 22, 1914.
- "The Leisure State," The New Age, Vol. XIV, No. 23, 1914.
- "The Upside Down Problem," The New Age, Vol. XIV, No. 24, 1914.
- "Mediaevalism and Modernism," The New Age, Vol. XIV, No. 25, 1914.
- "Art and Plutocracy," The New Age, Vol. XV, No. 1, 1914.
- "Fabians, Pigeons, and Dogs," The New Age, Vol. XV, No. 2, 1914.
- "Liberty and Art," The New Age, Vol. XV, No. 5, 1914.
- Essays on Post-Industrialism (1914) edited with Ananda Kentish Coomaraswamy
- Old Worlds for New, George Allen & Unwin ltd., 1917.
- "After the War," The New Age, Vol. XX, No. 11, 1917, pp. 246–248.
- "The Function of the State," The New Age, Vol. XXII, No. 9, 1917, pp. 165–166.
- "National Guilds v. the Class War," The New Age, Vol. XXIII, No. 16, 1918, pp. 250–253.
- "Dance of Siva," The New Age, Vol. XXIII, No. 17, 1918, pp. 274–275.
- "On the Class War Again," The New Age, Vol. XXIII, No. 21, 1918, pp. 330–331.
- "Syndicalism and the Neo-Marxians," The New Age, Vol. XXIII, No. 24, 1918, pp. 376–377.
- "The Neo-Marxians and the Materialist Conception of History," The New Age, Vol. XXIII, No. 25, 1918, pp. 393–394.
- "A Guildsman's Interpretation of History," The New Age, Vol. XXIV, No. 1, 1918, pp. 5–7.
- "National Guild Theory," The New Age, Vol. XXIV, No. 2, 1918, p. 31.
- "A Guildsman's Interpretation of History: From Rome to the Guilds," The New Age, Vol. XXIV, No. 3, 1918, pp. 38–41.
- Guilds and the Social Crisis, G. Allen & Unwin ltd., 1919.
- The Guild Alternative.
- A Guildsman's Interpretation of History, George Allen & Unwin ltd., 1920 [1st Pub. 1919; reprinted by IHS Press, 2004].
- Guilds, Trade and Agriculture, George Allen & Unwin ltd., 1921.
- Post Industrialism, with a Preface by G. K. Chesterton, George Allen & Unwin ltd., 1922.
- "The Obstacle of Industrialism." In The Return of Christendom, George Allen & Unwin, Ltd.
- Gilden, Gewerbe und Landwirtschaft (1922) translated by Otto Eccius
- Towards a Christian Sociology (1923),
- Agriculture and the unemployed (1925) with William Wright
- The Elements of Domestic Design (1930)
- Means and Ends (1932).
- Communism and the Alternative (1933)
- Distributism: A Manifesto (1937)
- The Gauntlet: A Challenge to the Myth of Progress (2002) collection, introduction by Peter Chojnowski
- Distributist Perspectives: Volume 1 – Essays on the Economics of Justice and Charity (2004) with others

== Notes ==
Arthur Penty in libraries (WorldCat catalog)
