= Penty =

Penty may refer to:

- Penty, a type of cottage
- Penty (surname)
