= The Lighthorseman =

Listed pub in York, England

- The pub in 2025

General information
- Type: Public house
- Location: 124 Fulford Road, Fishergate, York, England
- Coordinates: 53.9501°N 1.0755°W
- Year built: c. 1870; 156 years ago
- Renovated: 1930s (altered)
- Owner: Thwaites

Design and construction
- Architect: Walter Green Penty (possible)
- Designations

Listed Building – Grade II
- Official name: The Lighthorseman Hotel
- Designated: 21 April 1994
- Reference no.: 1257803

Website
- lighthorsemanyork.co.uk

Pub sign in 2023

The Lighthorseman is a Grade II listed public house with guest accommodation on Fulford Road in the Fishergate area of York, England. Dating from around 1870, it was probably purpose‑built as a pub and small hotel, according to CAMRA, and The Press has attributed its design to Walter Green Penty, although the official listing does not name an architect. The site was added to the New Walk/Terry Avenue conservation area in 1975 and listed in 1994 as part of a CAMRA–English Heritage pilot study, with CAMRA regarding the interior as of "special national historic interest". As of June 2025, the freehold is owned by Thwaites.

== History ==
The building stands on Fulford Road and dates from around 1870. The Campaign for Real Ale (CAMRA) considers it likely to have been purpose‑built as a public house and small hotel. The Press has attributed the design to York architect Walter Green Penty, although the official listing does not name an architect. The building's name refers to its historic links with the cavalry units based at Imphal Barracks about 0.4 miles (0.64 km) to the south. In 1902 the layout included a club room upstairs and, on the ground floor, a smoke room, bar parlour, large bar, two private rooms and a kitchen, with a cellar below.

In 1975 the site was included within the newly established New Walk/Terry Avenue conservation area, and on 21 April 1994 it was designated a Grade II listed building, one of the listings arising from the joint CAMRA and English Heritage pilot study undertaken that year. CAMRA regards The Lighthorseman as having an interior of "special national historic interest", and it is rated one star in the organisation's grading scheme, although its original layout has been further altered since its listing. As of June 2025, the freehold is owned by Thwaites Brewery.

== Architecture ==
=== Exterior ===
The building has a painted brick front and side walls, with brick of a different colour at the rear. It stands on a painted base, has stone detailing, and is roofed in slate with stone edging and brick chimneys. The front has two storeys and eight bays. Near the centre on the right is the hotel entrance, set in a decorative doorcase with a shaped four‑panel door and an arched overlight. To the left of centre is a similar doorway to the bar, framed by panelled pilasters and an arched head with a carved keystone. At the left end of the front are three tall arched windows divided by small columns with carved capitals; each window has a roundel at the top and a continuous moulding above. The other ground‑floor windows are arched sashes with coloured glass borders and moulded heads. The first floor has eight sash windows set under brick arches with shaped keystones. A band runs beneath the ground‑floor sills, with panelled sections below, and a prominent cornice sits above the ground floor. The eaves have a double frieze with consoles, repeated on both gable ends.

The left return is a four‑bay gable end with a curved corner. The street‑facing decorative treatment continues here, with paired ground‑floor windows between a panelled door on one side and a curved door on the other, and matching sash windows on the first floor.

=== Interior ===
The interior keeps its original arrangement, with a spacious tap room, a snug, a side lounge and an upstairs function room. It remains a multi‑room layout, despite alterations in the 1930s that removed the partitions in the main bar. The Victorian bar survives with its Lighthorseman lantern, along with large windows and high ceilings. The tap room retains its panelled bar and mirrored back fitting, and at the rear the dining area opens through French doors into a landscaped beer garden.

== See also ==
- Listed buildings in York (outside the city walls, southern part)
