= Marygate =

Street in York, England

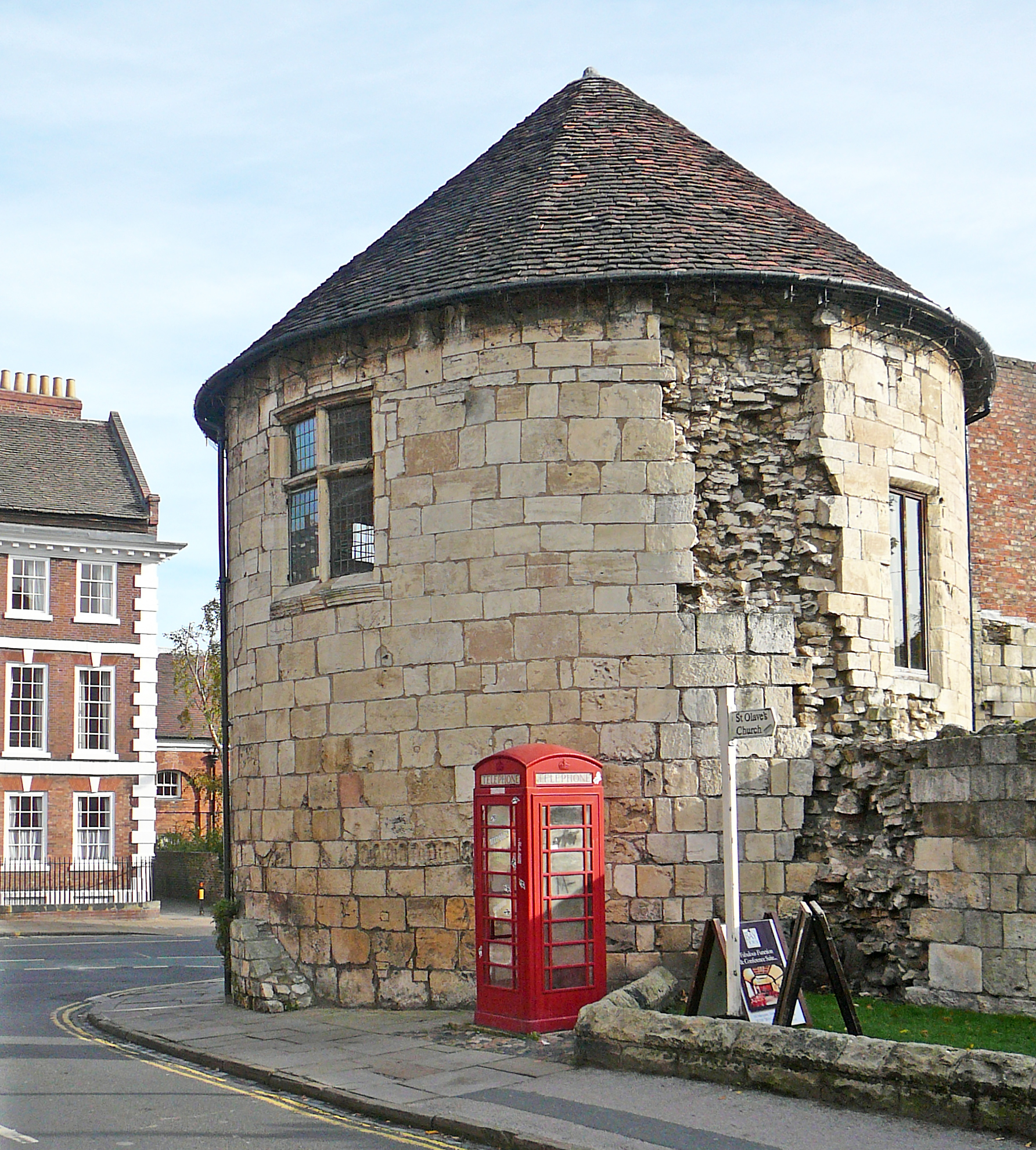
- St Mary's Tower, at the north-east end of the street
- Location within York
- Former name: St Marygate
- Location: York, England
- Postal code: YO30
- Coordinates: 53.9626°N 1.0890°W
- North East end: Bootham
- Major junctions: Marygate Lane
- South West end: Dame Judi Dench Walk

Marygate is a street in York, England, running just north of the city centre. Built in the Middle Ages, it gets its name from St Mary's Abbey and the Viking word "gata," meaning street. The area where the street lies was outside the walls of the Roman city of Eboracum, and represented the northern limit of the settlement; to the north, the land was used only for burials. The street runs south-west, from Bootham, down to the River Ouse.

== History ==
Marygate runs off the street of Bootham. During Roman times Bootham was the main Roman road from York to Catterick. The area where Marygate lies was used for burials. Marygate was outside the northern limit of the Roman settlement. In the early-11th century, the area was known as "Galmanho". Viking earl Siward built St Olave's Church on the street, and his house probably also lay on the street, the area later becoming known as "Earlsburgh".

Built in the Medieval period, the street known as St Marygate, was named for St Mary's Abbey, within the liberty of which it was located. It lay immediately north of the abbey, from which it was separated by a ditch and narrow strip of land, and from the 1260s also by a wall, which was turned into a major defensive structure in the following century. The wall runs the complete length of the street. On the street's corner with Bootham lay St Mary's Tower, while at the River Ouse end was a landing, used principally by the abbey. There were numerous houses on the street by the 13th-century. In 1378, the abbey blocked the street, to prevent goods being landed from the Ouse and taken into the city, but soon gave in, this proving the last serious dispute between the abbey and the city.

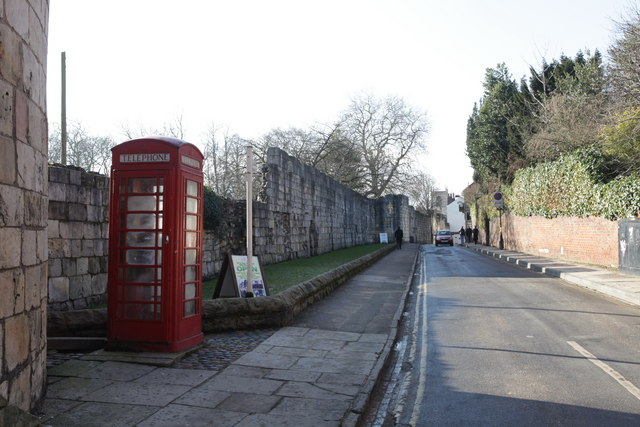
Looking south-west from Bootham, showing the abbey walls

The area was devastated during the Siege of York in 1644, and only structures protected by the abbey walls survive from before this date. The York Girls' Charity School was established on the street in 1705, remaining there until 1784. Also in the 18th-century, a cotton mill was constructed on the street, and in 1768 this became a workhouse for most of the parishes in the city. When the York Board of Guardians was established, in 1837, it took over the workhouse, but this could only house 90 people, and was highly unsanitary. It was finally replaced in 1847.

In 1836, the first large post-Roman bathhouse in the city was constructed at the bottom of the street; it operated until 1923. In 1848, the York Industrial Ragged School opened, remaining on the street until 1921. The Manor National School then took over the premises, until they were damaged by bombing in 1943. In 1949, the York School of Art acquired two studios on the street. Between 1937 and 1940, almost all the buildings on the south-east side of the street were demolished, to reveal the abbey wall.

The street is now primarily residential, and is described by the City of York Council as "one of the most picturesque streets in York", with "interest com[ing] from the unplanned nature of its development, leading to variety". Marygate Landing is often flooded, but has views down the river into the city centre.

== Layout and architecture ==
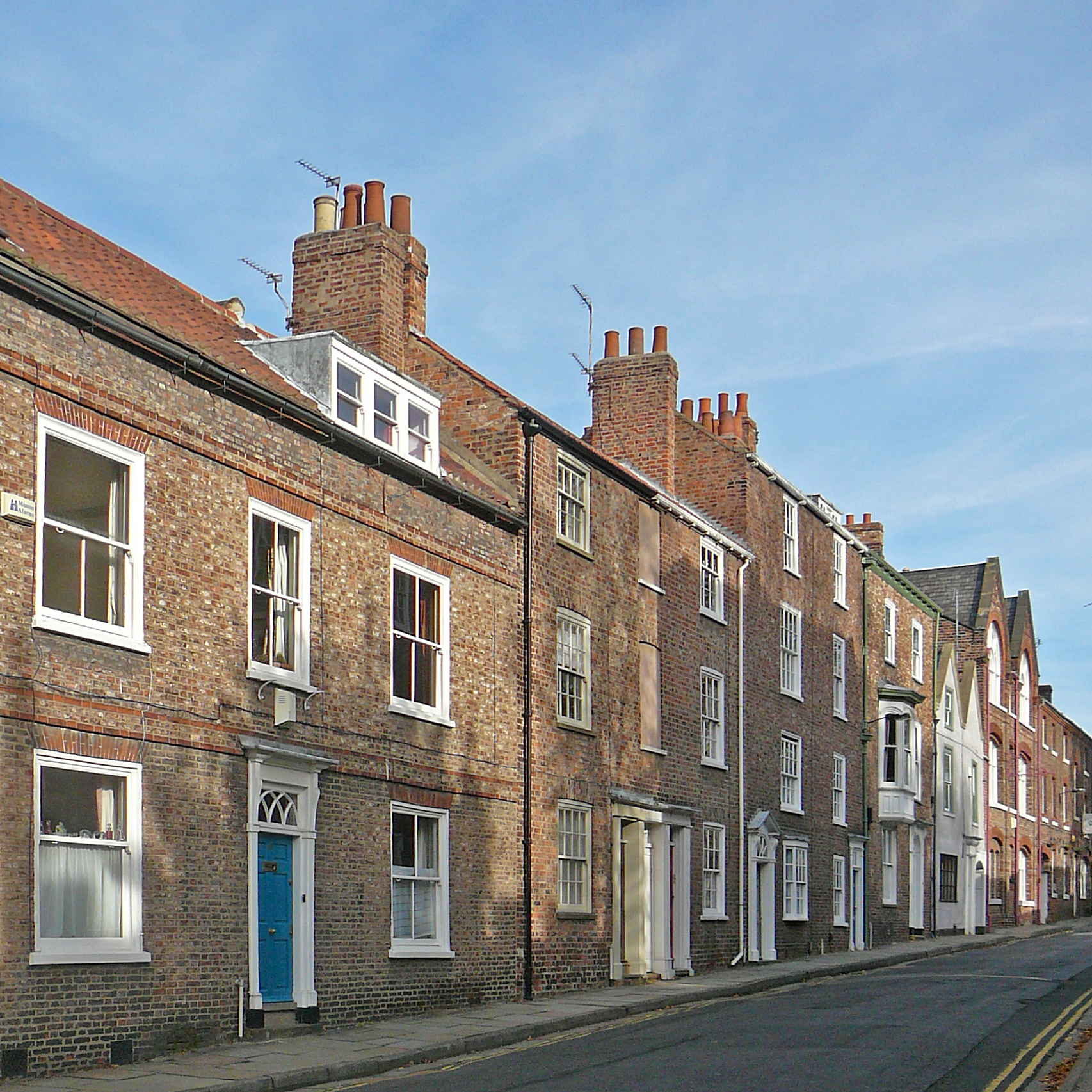
View north-east, on the central part of Marygate

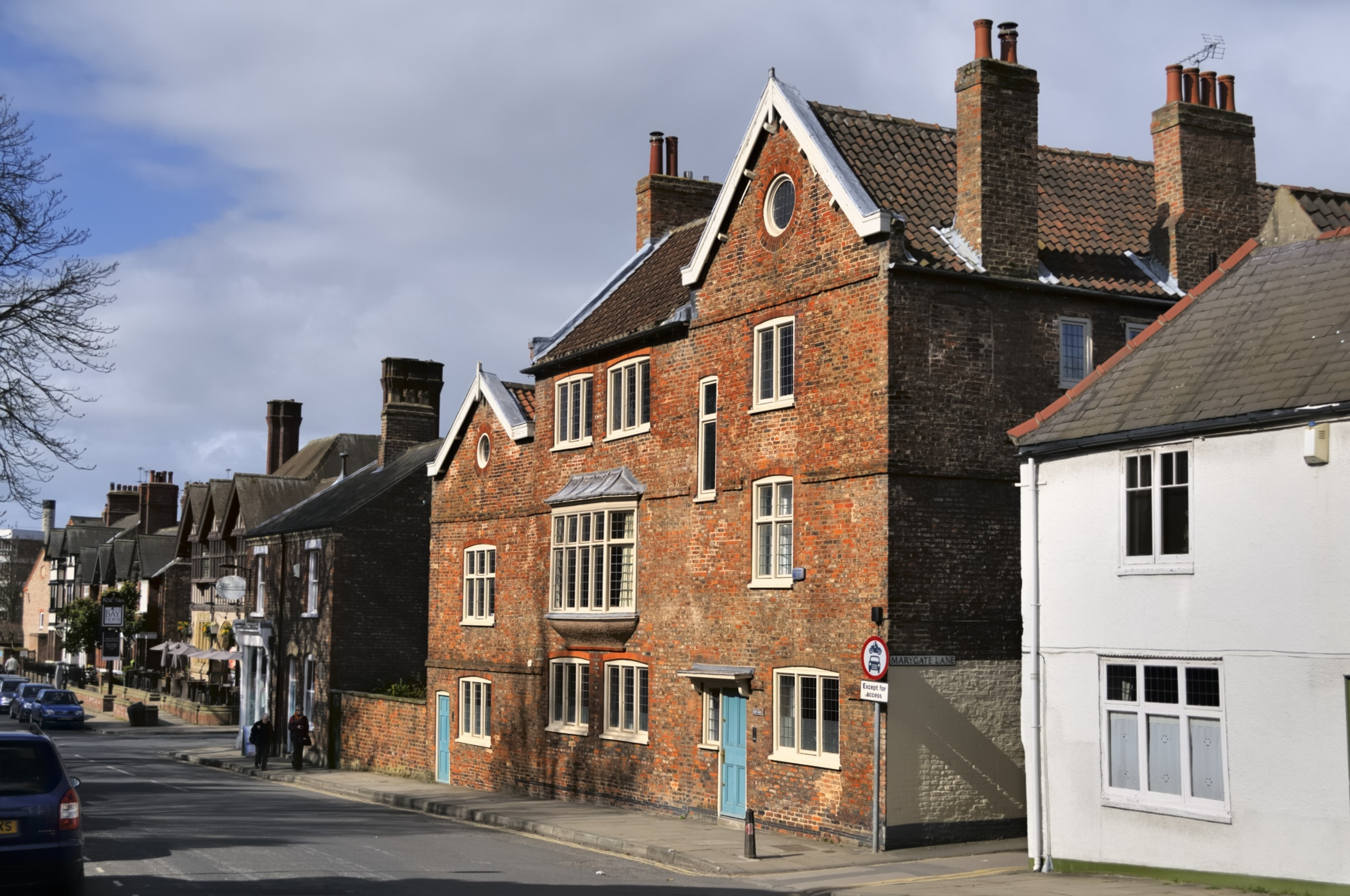
Looking south-west on the lower part of Marygate

The street runs south-west, from Bootham, down to the Marygate Landing on the River Ouse, where it meets Dame Judi Dench Walk. On the north-west side, it has junctions with Galmanhoe Lane, Marygate Lane and Hetherton Street. The south-east side has several gates through the abbey walls into what is now Museum Gardens.

Notable buildings on the north-west side of the street include Nos. 20 and 22, built about 1800 and 1850 respectively and now part of a hotel; the Minster Inn at No. 24, built in 1903; No. 26, whose façade is from around 1876; No. 27, formerly the Manor School building; No. 28, dating from the late 17th century; the early-19th-century No. 30; Nos. 32 and 34, built about 1800; Nos. 36 and 38, from the early 19th century; Nos. 40 and 42, built around 1760; the mid-19th-century Nos. 44 and 46; the late-17th-century St Olave's House at No. 48; No. 50, built about 1700; The Garth at No. 60, constructed as a school in 1705; the late-18th-century St Mary's Cottage at No. 62; and Roots restaurant at No. 68, built as the Bay Horse public house in 1894 to a design by Arthur Penty.

The surviving buildings on the south-west side are the wall, with St Mary's Tower and the Water Tower; the late-15th-century St Olave's Church; St Mary's Lodge and the gateway to the abbey; and the late-18th-century No. 29.
