= Middleton House, York =

Listed building in York, England

Middleton House
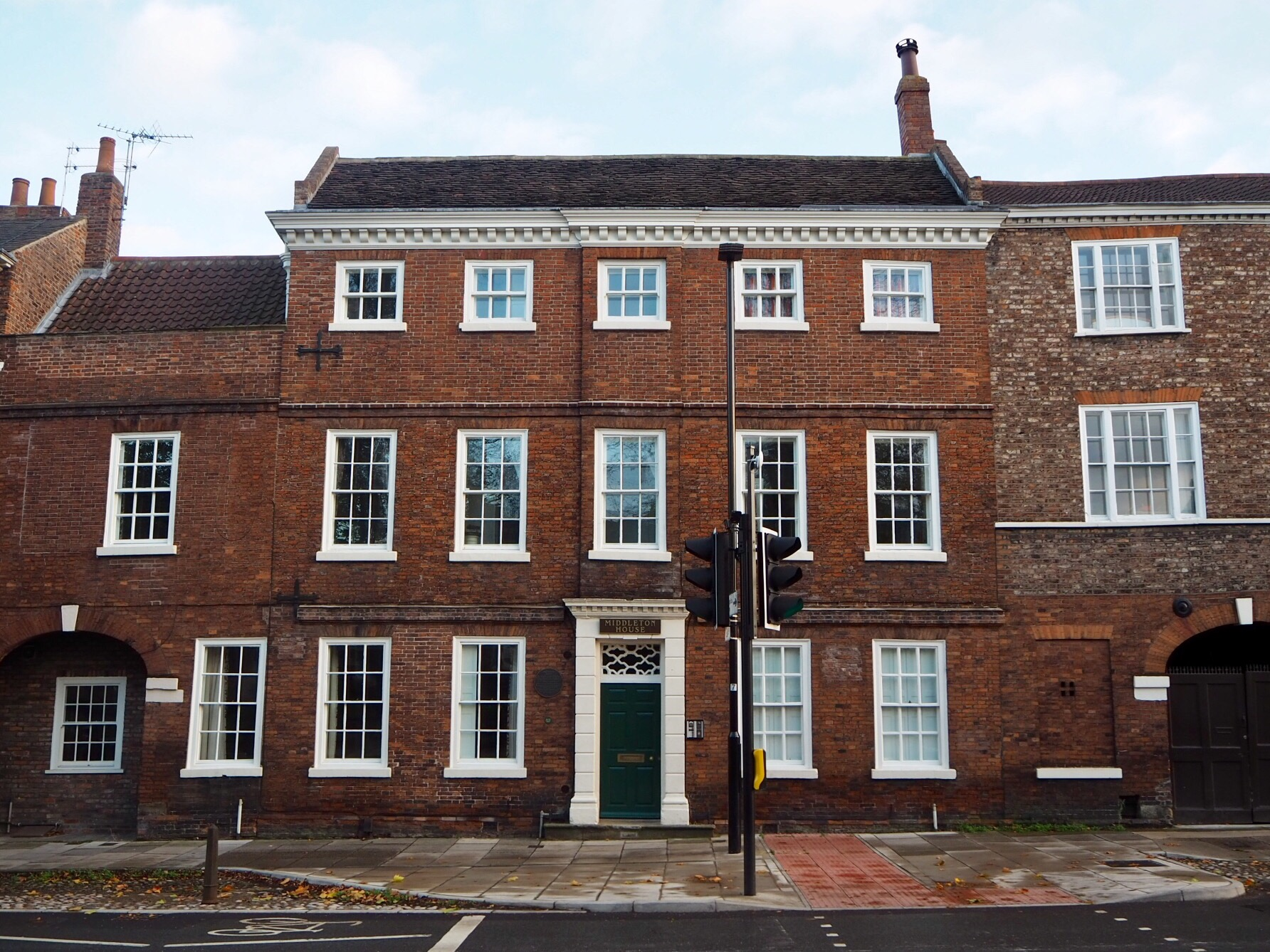
- The house in 2018

General information
- Status: Converted to apartments
- Location: 38 Monkgate, York, England
- Coordinates: 53°57′49″N 1°04′35″W
- Completed: c. 1700; 326 years ago
- Renovated: c. 1770 (altered); Early 19th century (altered); 1990s (converted)
- Client: Benjamin West (possible)

Technical details
- Floor count: 3

Design and construction
- Designations

Listed Building – Grade II*
- Official name: Middleton House
- Designated: 14 June 1954
- Reference no.: 1257207

Middleton House is a Grade II* listed building on Monkgate, immediately east of the city centre of York, England.

The house was built in about 1700 and may have been constructed for Benjamin West, who is known to have owned two of the neighbouring plots. It originally had two storeys, a five-bay front, and an L-shaped plan. In about 1770, the space between Middleton House and 40 Monkgate was filled when a carriage arch was built, with two rooms above. These rooms originally formed part of No. 40, but are now incorporated into Middleton House. Around the same time, a third storey was added.

In 1798, the Unitarian minister Charles Wellbeloved bought the house. In 1803, he agreed to become principal of Manchester College on the condition that it was relocated to York. This was accepted, and the college was accommodated in Middleton House until 1811. To increase space for the academy, the north ground-floor room was extended, new rooms were added at the rear, and a new carriage arch was constructed. In the 20th century, the carriage arch was filled in and another room added.

The building is constructed of brick, and original sash windows survive on the ground floor. Inside, the decoration of the north ground-floor room dates from the early 19th century, with the fireplace surround and cupboards made by John Wolstenholme. Most of the staircase is original, although the balusters of the bottom flight were replaced in the early 18th century. One of the rooms over the carriageway has a mid-18th-century fireplace surround, and two other rooms contain firegrates made by Carron in about 1803.

The house was purchased by the York Conservation Trust in 1990, which converted it into apartments and renovated the building.

== See also ==
- Grade II* listed buildings in the City of York
- Listed buildings in York (outside the city walls, northern part)
