= Guild socialism =

Political labor movement

Guild socialism is an ideology and a political movement advocating workers' control of industry through the medium of trade-related guilds "in an implied contractual relationship with the public". It originated in the United Kingdom and was at its most influential in the first quarter of the 20th century. It was strongly associated with G. D. H. Cole and influenced by the ideas of William Morris.

== History ==
Guild socialism was partly inspired by the guilds of craftsmen and other skilled workers which had existed in England in the Middle Ages. In 1906, Arthur Penty published Restoration of the Gild System in which he opposed factory production and advocated a return to an earlier period of artisanal production organised through guilds. The following year, the journal The New Age became an advocate of guild socialism, although in the context of modern industry rather than the medieval setting favoured by Penty.

In 1914, S. G. Hobson, a leading contributor to The New Age, published National Guilds: An Inquiry into the Wage System and the Way Out. In this work, guilds were presented as an alternative to state control of industry or conventional trade union activity. Guilds, unlike the existing trade unions, would not confine their demands to matters of wages and conditions but would seek to obtain control of industry for the workers whom they represented. Ultimately, industrial guilds would serve as the organs through which industry would be organised in a future socialist society.

The guild socialists "stood for state ownership of industry, combined with ‘workers’ control’ through delegation of authority to national guilds organized internally on democratic lines. About the state itself they differed, some believing it would remain more or less in its existing form and others that it would be transformed into a federal body representing the workers’ guilds, consumers’ organizations, local government bodies, and other social structures."

Ernst Wigforss—a leading theorist of the Social Democratic Party of Sweden—was also inspired by and stood ideologically close to the ideas of Fabian Society and the guild socialism inspired by people like R. H. Tawney, L.T. Hobhouse and J. A. Hobson. He made contributions in his early writings about industrial democracy and workers' self-management.

The theory of guild socialism was developed and popularised by G. D. H. Cole who formed the National Guilds League in 1915 and published several books on guild socialism, including Self-Government in Industry (1917) and Guild Socialism Restated (1920). A National Building Guild was established after World War I but collapsed after funding was withdrawn in 1921.

The science fiction work of Olaf Stapledon suggested that a more "individualistic" form of guild socialism would be a natural outcome for a united humanity hundreds of years in the future.

Cole's ideas were also promoted by prominent anti-authoritarian intellectuals such as the British logician Bertrand Russell, first through his 1918 essay Roads to Freedom. Other thinkers who incorporated Cole's writings on guild socialism include the economist Karl Polanyi, R. H. Tawney, A. R. Orage, and the American liberal reformer John Dewey.

For scholar Charles Masquelier, "[i]t is by meeting such a twofold requirement that the libertarian socialism of G.D.H. Cole could be said to offer timely and sustainable avenues for the institutionalization of the liberal value of autonomy...By setting out to 'destroy this predominance of economic factors' (Cole 1980, 180) through the re-organization of key spheres of life into forms of associative action and coordination capable of giving the 'fullest development of functional organisation'...Cole effectively sought to turn political representation into a system actually capable of giving direct recognition to the multiplicity of interests making up highly complex and differentiated societies".

== See also ==
- Christopher Lasch
- Distributism
- Syndicalism
- Anarcho-syndicalism
- Council communism
- Industrial democracy
- Industrial unionism
- Market socialism
- Mutualism (economic theory)
- State Socialism (Germany)
- Workplace democracy

== Footnotes ==
- Stapledon, Olaf (1930). "4. An Americanized Planet". The Last and First Men. Metheun. ISBN 978-1-85798-806-2.
