= Minster Inn =

Pub in North Yorkshire, England

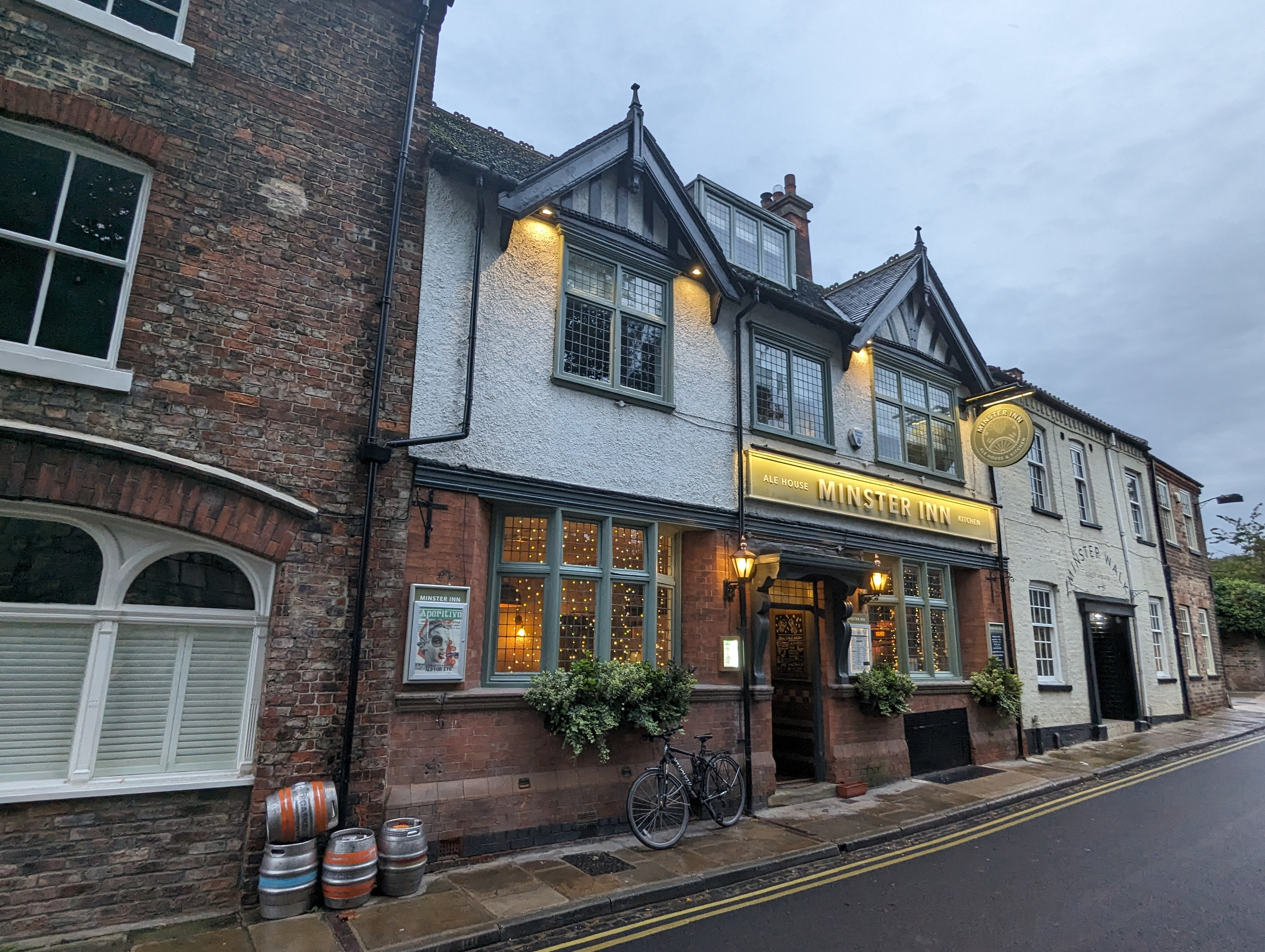
- The pub in 2023

General information
- Type: Public house
- Location: 24 Marygate, York, England
- Coordinates: 53.96314°N 1.08827°W
- Opening: 1903; 123 years ago
- Owner: Marston's

Design and construction
- Architect: Samuel Needham

Website
- minsterinn.com

The Minster Inn is a public house on Marygate, immediately north of the city centre of York, England.

The pub was first mentioned in 1823, at which time it was located in a building on the south-east side of Marygate. Although it was later renamed the Gardener's Arms, in the mid-1880s, it became the Minster Inn again. By 1902, it was owned by the Tadcaster Tower Brewery, which decided to relocate it to a new building, opposite the original site, on the north-west side of the street.

The new building was designed by Samuel Needham, and it opened in 1903. It is a small pub, based around a through corridor, and with four equally sized rooms, two on each side of the corridor. Although the room at the rear right is a later conversion, the original layout otherwise survives, as do the original windows, doors and tiles. The two left-hand rooms retain their original bench seating and bell-pushes, originally used to call for service.

The Campaign for Real Ale describes the pub as having "rare intactness" for its date, and it appears on the organisation's Yorkshire Regional Inventory of Historic Pub Interiors. In 2009, it submitted the pub for listing, but this was not achieved. The Yorkshire Post notes that it has a fire in winter, and a small courtyard. As of June 2026, the freehold is owned by Marston's.
