= Manor Church of England Academy =

Secondary school in York, England

Location
- Millfield Lane, Nether Poppleton; York, North Yorkshire, YO26 6PA; England; 53.97060°N 1.13268°W

Information
- Type: Academy
- Motto: Deo Duce (Latin: "Led By God") "Serving Others, Growing Together, Living Life to the Full"
- Religious affiliation: Church of England
- Established: 1812; 214 years ago
- Local authority: City of York
- Department for Education URN: 136544 Tables
- Ofsted: Reports
- Chair of Governors: Andrew Richardson
- Principal: Jordan Cairns (as of September 2023)
- Staff: 86 (as of March 2012)
- Gender: Male and female
- Age: 11 (Year 7) to 16 (Year 11)
- Enrolment: 914 (as of March 2012)
- Houses: Abbey, Kings, Stuart, Wentworth
- Website: https://mce.hslt.academy/

Manor Church of England Academy a coeducational secondary school in York, England, and since April 2011, a Specialist Arts College and Leadership Partner School. Manor's history and traditions extend back two hundred years, over several sites in the city. Manor is part of the multi-academy trust Hope Learning Trust, York.

== Manor's school history ==
=== Establishment and King's Manor, 1812–1922 ===
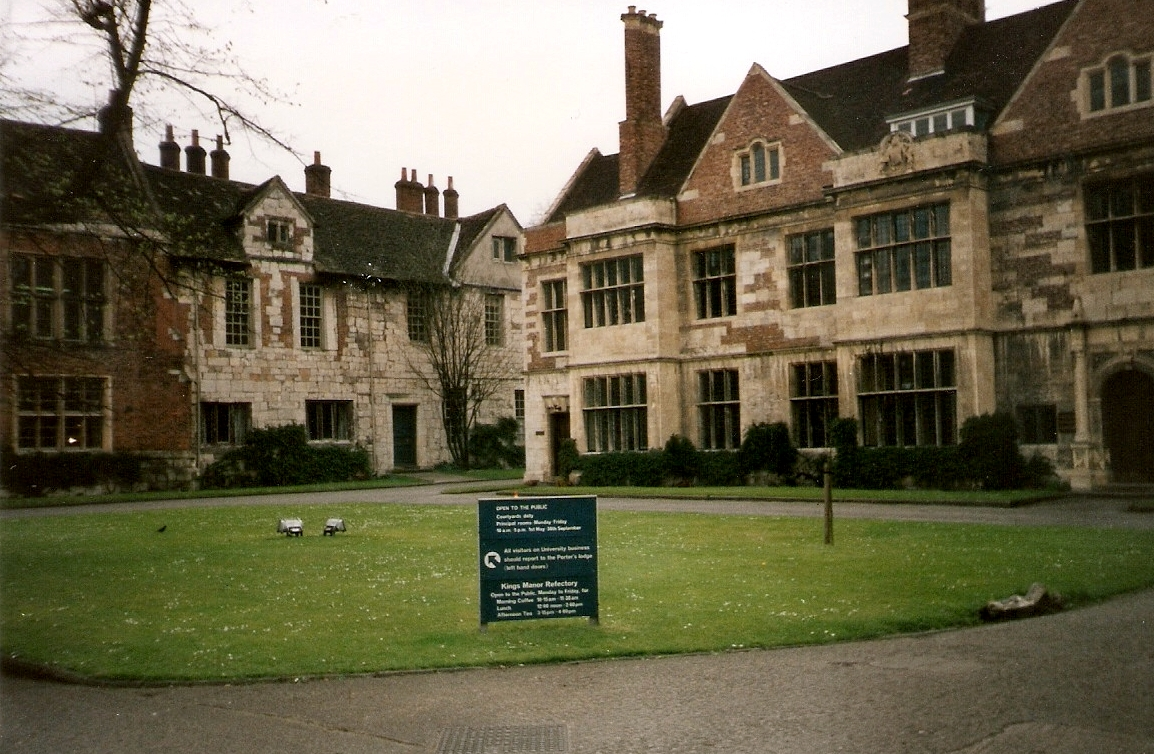
Kings Manor Lawn, York

Manor School originated as a project by the newly formed York Diocesan Board of the National Society for the Education of the Poor, whose remit was to establish schools in each parish for the educating of the 'labouring classes', to 'render them useful and respected members of society.' The first building was secured with the Merchant Taylor's Company to rent their hall on Aldwark, and on 21 May 1812, 200 boys began their first day at the newly formed school.

By 21 October 1812, an agreement had been reached for the school to use the 'Great Room' in the historic King's Manor, as part of a plan to open a separate girls' school in Aldwark. By 1815 303 boys, 175 girls and six trainee teachers were attending the two school sites.

=== Marygate, 1922–1942 ===
After 110 years in the King's Manor, the accommodation was condemned, and the school moved to the former premises of York Industrial School on Marygate, with the aid of a £3,800 grant from the National Society. By 1932 the school enrolled 400 senior boys.

In the early hours of 29 April 1942, a Luftwaffe bombing raid on York resulted in a direct hit on the Manor School building, the headmaster arriving at 5am to find the building 'in ruins'.

=== Priory Street, 1942–1965 ===
Within a fortnight, the school was re-established in 'five good rooms, one not so good, two small cloakrooms and a share of the laboratory and gymnasium – very cramped quarters.' The rooms were assigned to teach French, English, maths, art, and history to the 240 pupils attending.

=== Low Poppleton Lane, 1965–2009 ===
Work started in April 1964 on a new building, the first purpose-built for the school. Overseen by Ron Dean, a young architect on his first job at Ward, Ruddick and Ward, the construction was completed in just under two years, at a cost of £133,101. This was the first site for the school to have playing fields, and lessons commenced on 1 November 1965. The buildings were extended some time later, to include a new wing as the enrolment increased to around 650 pupils.

In 1985 the school became a comprehensive.

=== Millfield Lane, 2009– ===
In April 2009, Manor School moved to a new, highly improved site on Millfield Lane, York. The £17.6 million development now houses over three hundred more pupils than the old building, and includes facilities such as recording studios, industrial kitchens, and a central chapel for pupils. A new building, the HIVE, has been built to host Creative and Media collaborative provision for the city of York. This includes a theatre with gang plank, ticket desk and refreshments counter.

In 2010 applications were advanced for Manor to receive 'academy' status, one of only two schools in the city (and 153 nationwide) that applied for this increased independence. This has led to a call in the House of Commons from York Outer MP Julian Sturdy for greater budget clarity for academies.

In 2023, a new balcony area was completed and opened.

=== Headteachers ===
Headmaster Peter Smith (left) with Archbishop John Habgood, at the official opening of Manor as a comprehensive school, 1985

- 1812–41 – Samuel Danby
- 1841–47 – Frederick Lyne
- 1847–49 – William Pearson
- 1849–53 – Thomas Haughton
- 1853–64 – John Bird
- 1864–65 – Henry Ripley
- 1866–1910 – George Kenyon Hitchcock
- 1910–22 – George King Hitchcock
- 1922–32 – Maurice Gilbert Teesdale
- 1932–35 – G. F. Jackson
- 1935–43 – D. H. Cooper
- 1943–53 – Herbert Wroe
- 1953–68 – Norman Fieldsend
- 1968–74 – George Ranson
- 1975–81 – Marion Hodgson
- 1981–2001 – Peter Smith
- 2002–16 – Brian Crosby
- 2016–22 – Simon Barber
- 2022-23 - Elizabeth Mastin
- 2023–Present – Jordan Cairns

== Manor Currently ==
=== Music ===
Manor's music performances include those of its jazz band 'Manjazz' touring Europe, winning competitions (including at a performance at the Royal Festival Hall) and fundraising in York city centre. Manor School produced a pupil choir in the 1990s, an orchestra, and rock bands that competed at the York Inter-school Battle of the Bands competition, held at the York Barbican Centre.

=== Performing arts ===
As an 'arts college' Manor school has produced shows and musicals organised by staff and pupils.

The performing arts building contains a 400-seat capacity hall with sound and lighting, and a 70-seat drama studio with space for drama lessons and TV recording. The HIVE is a purpose-built creative and media centre seating 209.

=== Religious aspects of Manor ===
As a school affiliated with the Church of England, faith and worship is often given as a reason pupils and staff choose to come to Manor. The current building has a designated space for worship and prayer, and features a cross on the building exterior, and plaques with the Lord's Prayer in each classroom. In addition, the academy has a chaplain who attends one and a half days a week. Manor pupils attend a regular Eucharist service, for which they may travel to the nearby Holy Redeemer Church, on Boroughbridge Road. The academy website states that it does not present Church doctrine as propaganda: "It's not our purpose to take people in Year 7 and turn them into Christians by Year 11... Instead, we hope to encourage and explore ways which will enable young people to make a decision about faith." The Church appoints the majority of school governors.

=== Performance and applications ===
In 2012 Manor School pupils achieved 97% 5 or more A*-C grades (first in the city) and 66% including English and Maths (the government's headline measure), ranking it third in the city.

The school has been regularly oversubscribed and has a selection criteria for acceptance into the school that includes the faith and church attendance of the family, siblings already attending, and proximity to the school. In 2009–10 Manor was the second most over-subscribed school in the country, having to turn down many applicants for available spaces. In September 2012 there were 180 places available for new entrants into Year 7 each year, 99 of which are allocated according to the child's stated religion.

Manor offers GCSEs in PE, Food, Textiles, Product Design, Art, French/German, Geography, History, Music, Dance, Drama, IT, Computing and Triple Science on top of compulsory English, Maths, Religious Studies and at least Double Science. There is also an option to go to the Vale of York to do photography, psychology or business studies. Other courses at GCSE level with alternative qualifications are Child Development, Catering and Hospitality, Leadership, and Performing Arts. One lesson a week is set aside for 'Enrichment'; these lessons vary from cooking in the lower years to careers/life skills in higher years.
