= Bristol Socialist Society =

Former political organisation in Bristol, England

- Formation: pre 1886
- Dissolved: 1914
- Official language: English
- Key people: Katherine St John Conway, Dan Irving, Enid Stacy, John Gregory, Ernest Bevin, Samuel George Hobson, Ramsay MacDonald, Ben Tillett

The Bristol Socialist Society was a political organisation in South West England.

The group originated in 1885 as a local affiliate of the Social Democratic Federation. However, in 1886, it instead affiliated to the Socialist Union. When that group disbanded, it continued an independent existence until at least 1914.

The society initially enjoyed a high level of success, holding weekly public meetings and a wide variety of other propaganda events. Its members included Katherine St John Conway, Dan Irving, Enid Stacy, John Gregory, Ernest Bevin, Samuel George Hobson, Ramsay MacDonald and even Ben Tillett.
