= Roots (restaurant) =

Listed restaurant in York, England

- The restaurant in 2025
- Former names: Bay Horse

General information
- Status: Converted to restaurant use
- Type: Public house (former)
- Location: 68 Marygate, York, England
- Coordinates: 53°57′43″N 1°05′26″W
- Year built: 1893–1894; 132 years ago
- Renovated: 20th century (altered); 2018 (converted)

Design and construction
- Architects: Walter and Arthur Penty
- Designations

Listed Building – Grade II
- Official name: The Bay Horse
- Designated: 14 March 1997
- Reference no.: 1257385

Website
- rootsyork.com

Roots is a restaurant on Marygate, just north of the city centre of York, England. The building was constructed between 1893 and 1894 as the Bay Horse public house, replacing an earlier inn of the same name on the opposite side of the street. Designed by Walter and Arthur Penty, it was run for many years by Eve and Arthur Briggs. After closing in 2004, the pub reopened briefly before being converted into a restaurant in 2018 by Tommy Banks and Matthew Lockwood. Roots became the first restaurant in York to receive a Michelin star, awarded in 2021.

== History ==
The building was constructed on Marygate as the Bay Horse public house between 1893 and 1894. It replaced an earlier pub of the same name on the opposite side of the road and was designed by Walter and Arthur Penty. From 1951 until 1986, it was run by Eve and Arthur Briggs.

In 1968 the site was included within the newly established Central Historic Core conservation area, and on 14 March 1997, the Bay Horse was designated a Grade II listed building.

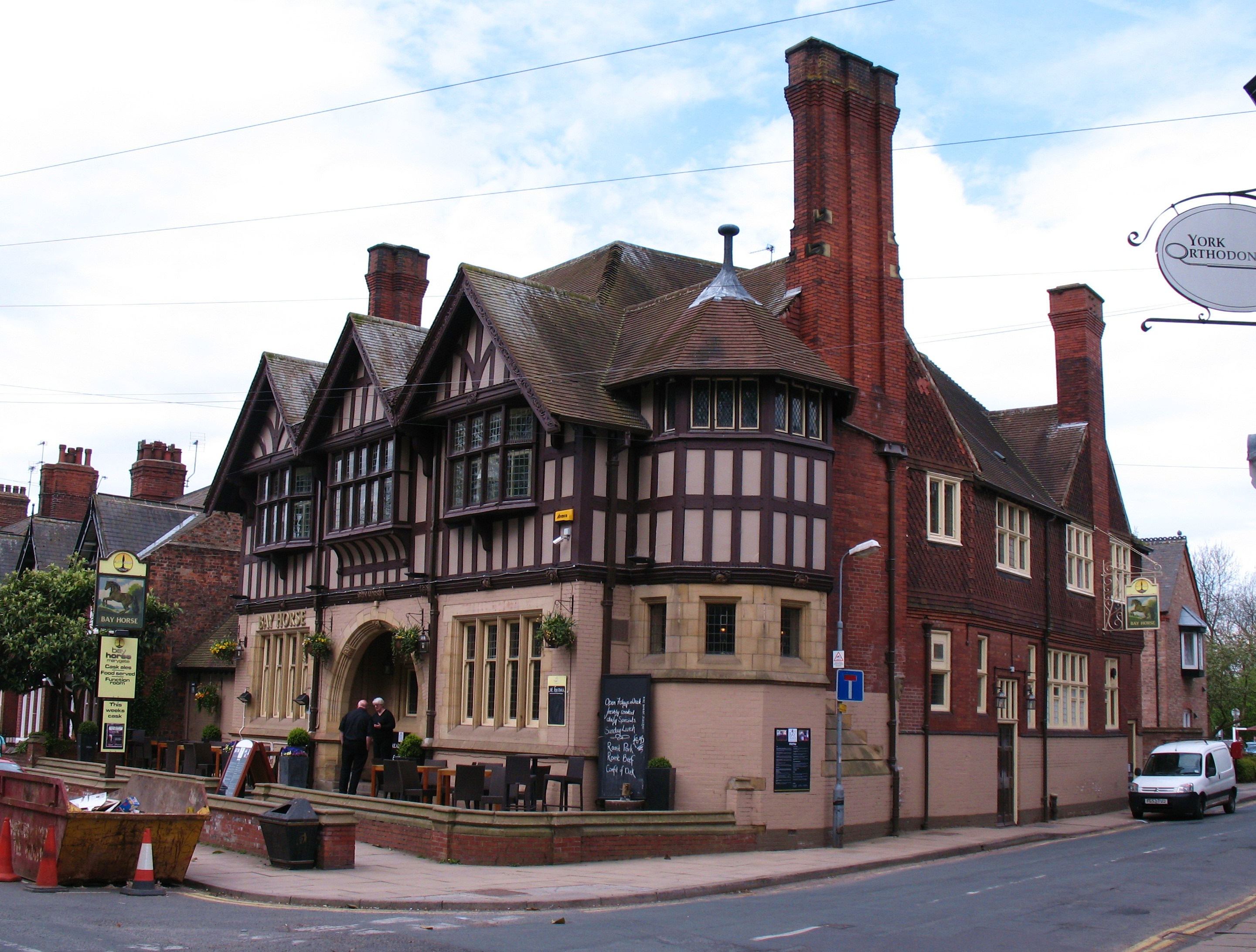
The building in 2010, in use as a pub

The pub closed in 2004, at which time it was owned by Wolverhampton and Dudley Breweries. In 2007, the brewery proposed converting the building into an office with flats above; however, it instead reopened as a pub in 2008.

In 2018, chef Tommy Banks and restaurateur Matthew Lockwood converted the building into a restaurant named "Roots", focusing on local produce and self-sufficiency. In 2021, it became the first restaurant in the city to win a Michelin star.

== Architecture ==
The building is of brick, with the upper floor finished in a mix of tile hanging and simple timber work. Stone is used around the ground‑floor doors and windows, and the roof is tiled with tall brick chimneys. The front has three gabled sections facing Marygate, with a small half‑octagonal tower at the right corner and a central porch set within a rounded arch. Above the doorway is a panel which reads "BUILT 1894".

Most windows are mullioned and transomed; some on the first floor have diamond‑pattern glazing. The gables contain varied decorative framing, and carved details appear around the porch and first‑floor beam. A metal plate above the entrance carries the name Bay Horse.

The tower has a pointed roof with deep eaves. Its windows are grouped by storey, with a single latticed light below and three leaded lights above. The right‑hand side has five bays divided by tall chimneys, with panelled doors and a mixture of window sizes, all with lattice glazing. One chimney carries a carved panel showing a bay horse.

=== Interior ===
On the ground floor, the original layout is still recognisable, although some openings were enlarged in the 20th century. Surviving early features include the bar and two timber fireplaces with their upper panels. One has fluted side pieces and a carved panel showing a bay horse with the date 1898. The staircase is original, with a solid outer board and turned balusters.

== See also ==
- Listed buildings in York (outside the city walls, northern part)
