= Walter Green Penty =

British architect (1852–1902)

- Born: 19 June 1852; Fulford, North Yorkshire, England
- Died: 23 January 1902 (aged 49); York, England
- Occupation: Architect
- Spouse: Emma Seller
- Children: 9, including Arthur Penty
- Parent(s): Thomas Penty and Maria Green
- Practice: W. G. Penty and G. Benson; Penty and Penty
- Buildings: York Institute of Art, Science and Literature

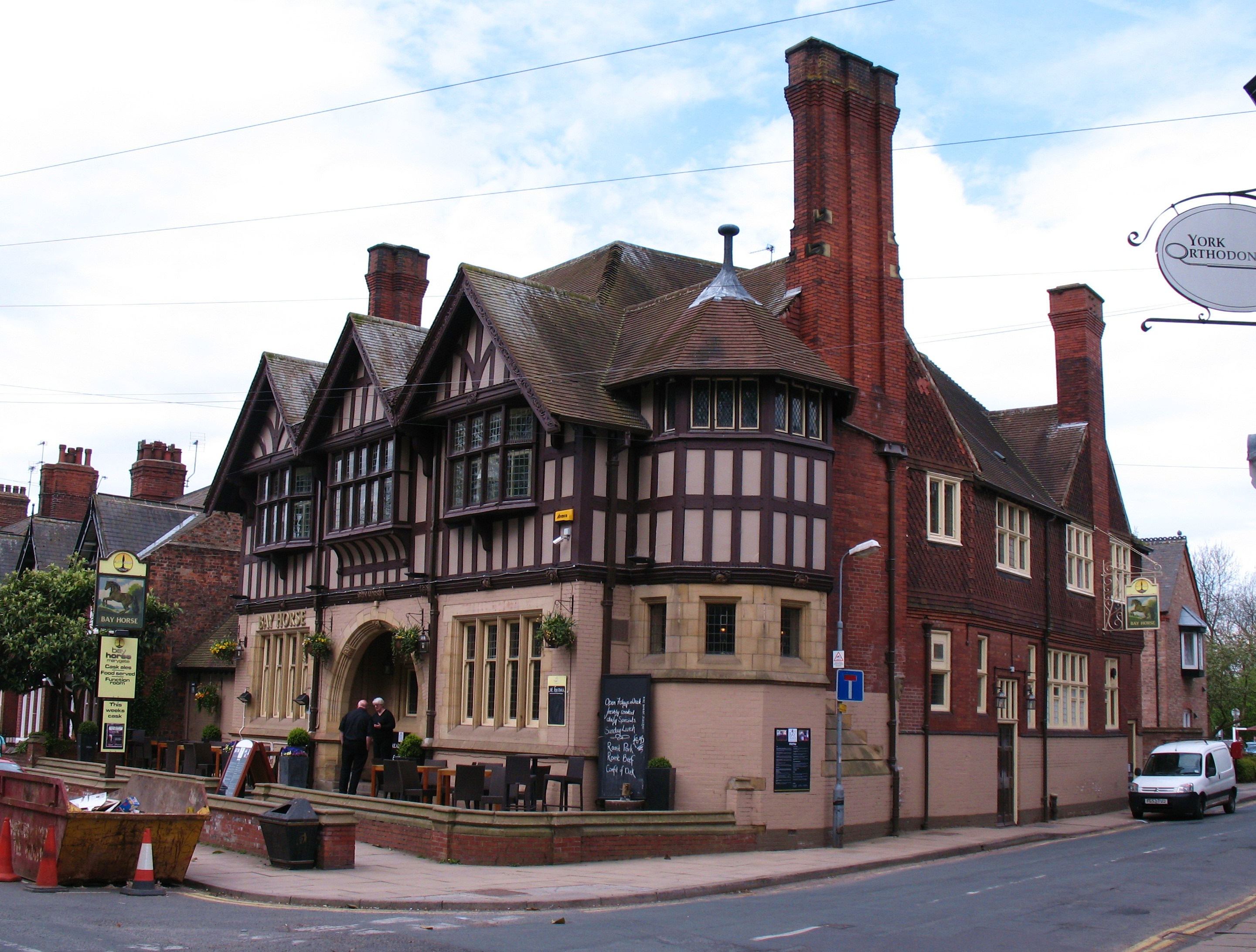
The Bay Horse, Marygate, York 1893–94

Walter Green Penty FRIBA (19 June 1852 – 23 January 1902) was an architect working in York, England.

== Early life and family ==
Penty was born in Gate Fulford, the son of Thomas Penty (1827–1893) and Maria Green (1831–1863). He married Emma Seller (1847–1937) on 2 September 1872 at St Lawrence's Church, York and they had nine children:

- Horace Seller Penty (1874–1930)
- Arthur Joseph Penty (1875–1937), also an architect
- Edith Maria Penty (1876–1943)
- Frederick Thomas Penty (1879–1943), also an architect
- Gertrude Mary Penty (1882–1957)
- Percy Walter Penty (1884–1955)
- George Victor Penty (1885–1967), emigrated to Australia
- Charles Bertram Penty (1886–1957)
- Lance Corporal Sidney Wallace Penty (1890–1918)

== Career ==
Penty studied as a pupil of George Styan, the City Engineer of York from 1867 to 1871, and commenced independent practice in the city in 1873. A partnership with George Benson followed, but this was dissolved in 1890. In 1898 he entered into partnership with his son Arthur Joseph, trading as Penty and Penty.

In 1876 he was appointed surveyor of the York Union Rural Sanitary Authority.

He became the first president of the York Architectural Association when it was formed in 1882, and was elected for a second two-year term in 1888.

Penty's first commission was the Burnholme Social Club in Heworth, York. He also designed The Lighthorseman pub at the junction of Fulford Road and New Walk Terrace in the 1870s; a previous pub of the same name on the site appears on the 1852 Ordnance Survey map of York. Around 1880 he designed Botterill's Horse Repository in Tanner's Moat, of which two arches survive. This was a sort of 'garage' for horses belonging to gentlemen who had ridden into the city, possibly to continue their journey by rail. During the 1890s, Arthur joined his father to form the firm of Penty and Penty. Among other works, they built the Terry Memorial almshouses in Skeldergate in 1899 and laid out several streets in the Clementhorpe area of York, before Arthur left the city to work in London.

In 1883 he was elected councillor for the Walmgate Ward and served for one year.

He was elected a Fellow of the Royal Institute of British Architects on 11 March 1889.

== Works ==
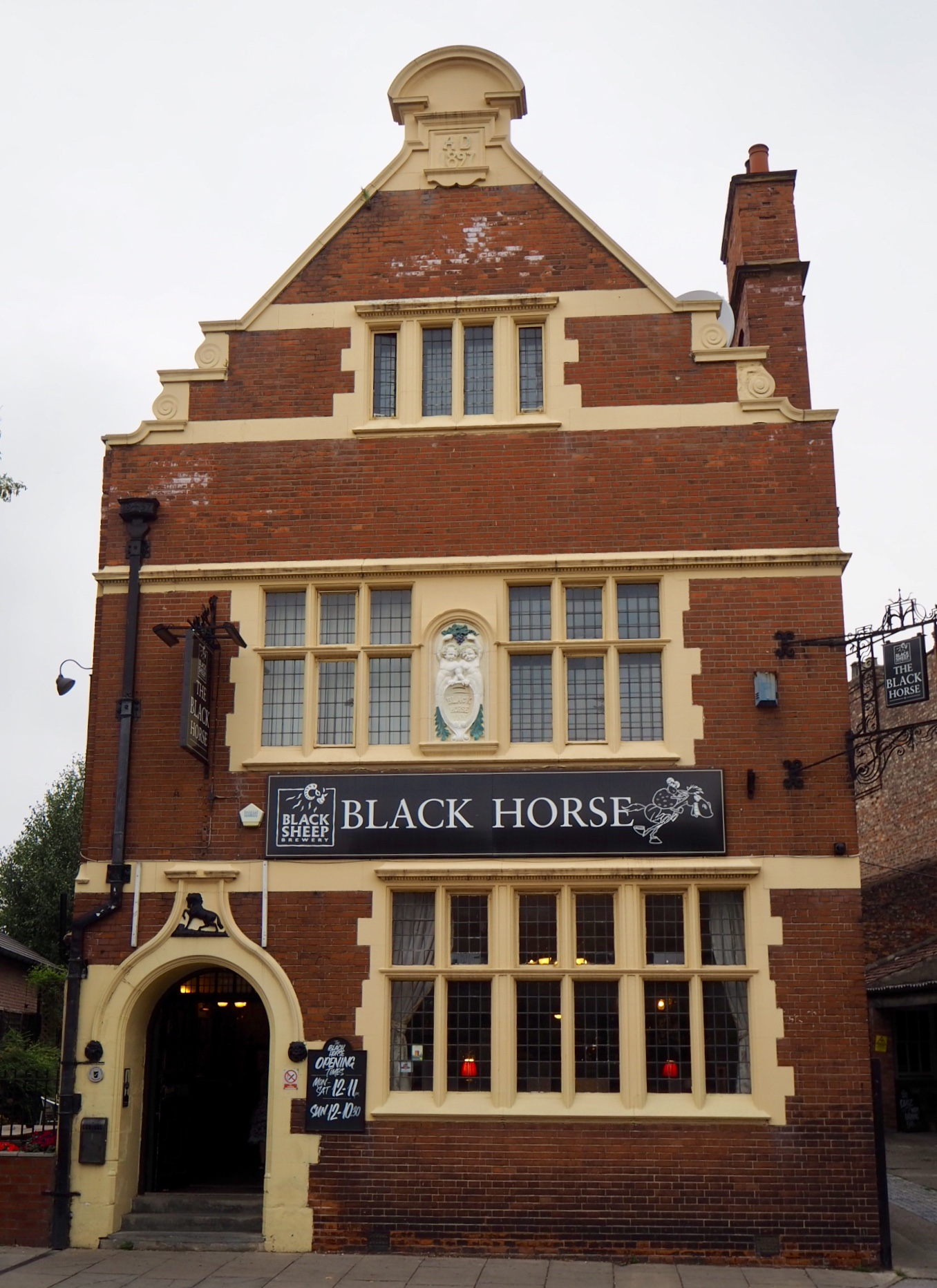
Black Horse, originally trading under that name and later as the Tap and Spile, 29 Monkgate, York (1897)

- Private house, "Burnholme", near York (later Burnholme Social Club, demolished c. 2014)
- Bellarby and Son Cigar Works, Coney Street, York (1874)
- New Schools and Schoolmaster's House, Melbourne, East Riding of Yorkshire (1877)
- St Saviour's Church, York, vestry, (1878)
- Terrace of houses, 1–9 The Avenue, York (1880–1890)
- Private house for Thomas Liversedge, "Brooklands", 28 Leeds Road, Selby, (1883–84)
- York Institute of Art, Science and Literature, 12 Clifford Street, York (1883–1885)
- Walker's Horse Repository, Tanner's Moat, York (1884)
- York Liberal Club (1888)
- Lodging House for The York Coffee House Company, 114 Walmgate, York (c. 1890)
- New Pavilion, York Cricket Club (1892)
- The Bay Horse public house, Marygate, York (1893–94)
- 29 Trinity Lane, York (extension, 1895)
- Leetham's flour rolling mills, Rowntree Wharf, Navigation Road, York (1896)
- Yorkshire Hussar public house, 15 North Street, York (1896)
- Black Horse public house, 29 Monkgate, York (1897)
- Old Grey Mare public house, Clifton Green, York, alterations (late 19th century)
- New Laundry, York Workhouse (1898–99)
- Terry Memorial almshouses, Skeldergate (1899)
- Elm Bank, The Mount, York (remodelling, 1900–01)
