= Rowntree Wharf =

Listed building in York, England

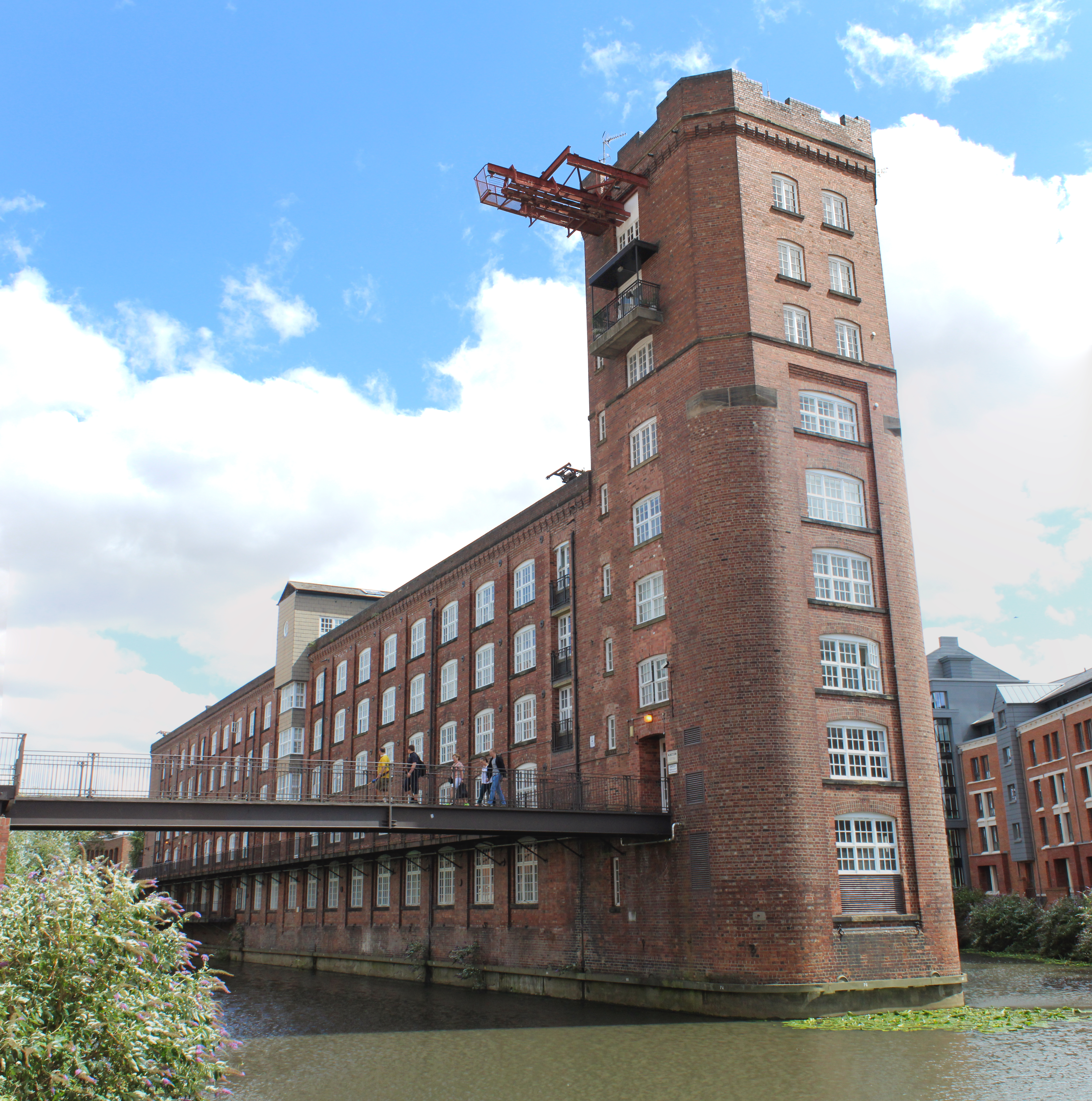
- The building in 2018
- Former names: Navigation Warehouse
- Alternative names: Leetham's Mill

General information
- Status: Converted into flats
- Type: Flour mill, warehouse and silo (former)
- Location: Navigation Road, York, England
- Coordinates: 53.9579°N 1.0745°W
- Year built: 1896; 130 years ago
- Renovated: c. 1990 (converted)
- Client: Leetham & Sons

Design and construction
- Architect: Walter Green Penty

Listed Building – Grade II
- Official name: Rowntree Wharf
- Designated: 24 June 1983
- Reference no.: 1257088

Rowntree Wharf, also known as Leetham's Mill, is a historic building on Navigation Road in the city centre of York, England.

== History ==
In the 1860s, Leetham & Sons established a flour mill on Wormald's Cut, an arm of the River Foss in York. Between 1895 and 1896, the company constructed a large warehouse and adjoining silo, to a design by Walter Green Penty. It lies between the Foss and Wormald's Cut, and Leetham's agreed an annual payment towards keeping the Foss navigable. The mill was initially successful, becoming one of the largest operations in Europe, but it closed in 1930. In 1935, the building was sold to Rowntree's, renamed the "Navigation Warehouse", and used to receive shipments of cocoa beans. As the company increasingly moved to use road transport, its use of the warehouse declined. In 1989, the Joseph Rowntree Foundation converted it into flats and offices. In the 2010s, the foundation sold the building, and the offices were converted into additional flats. The building was Grade II listed in 1983. Nikolaus Pevsner describes it as "York's best industrial building".

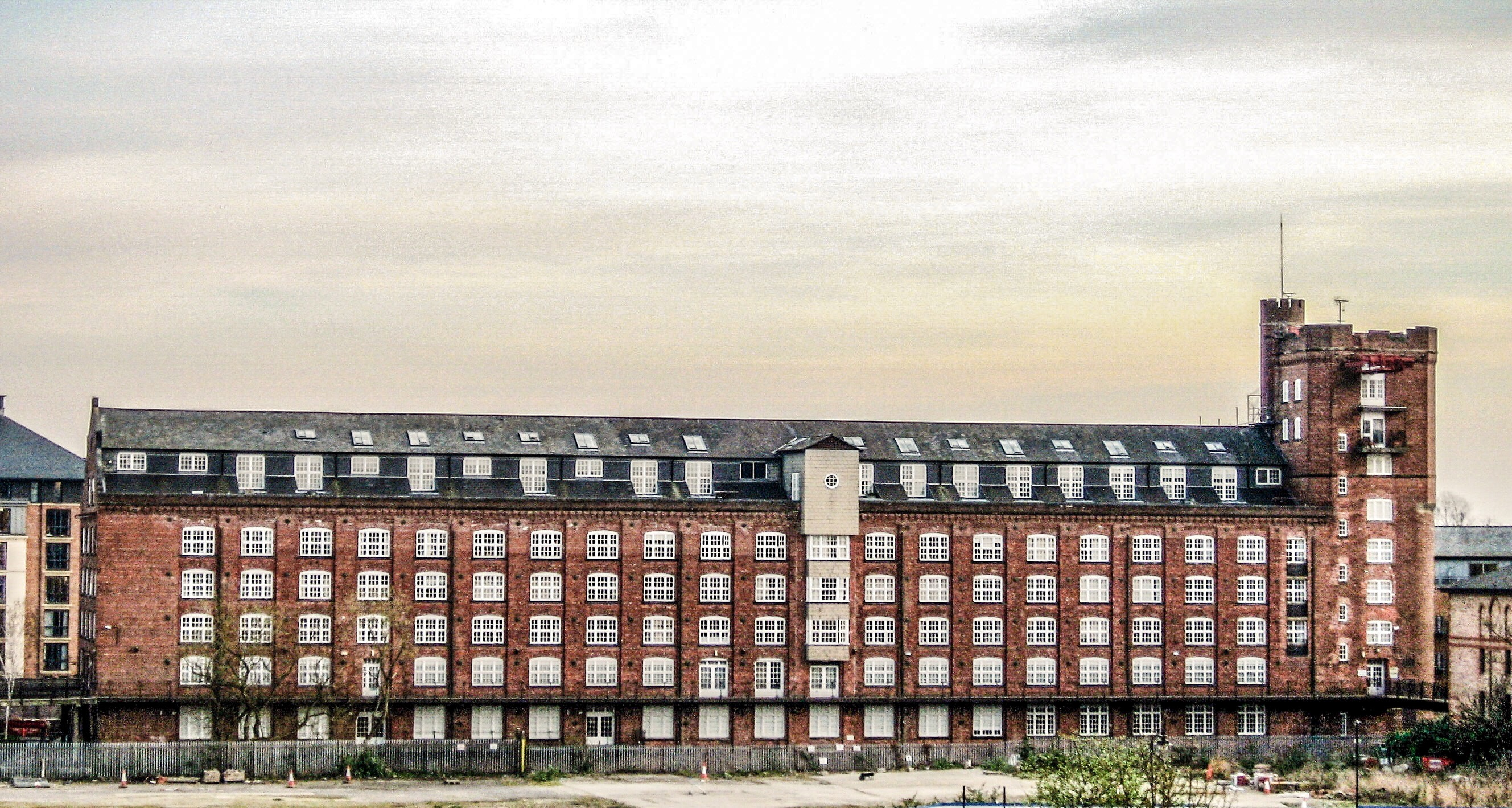
North facade, seen across the River Foss

== Architecture ==
The building is constructed of orange-brown brick with stone details and a slate roof. It is largely five storeys with a weatherboarded clerestory set back on top, while the entrance front has only four storeys, and there is a nine-storey tower. The south front to Wormald's Cut has 17 main bays with a canopy over the ground floor openings, and three more bays on a cant, linking it to the tower. The north front to the Foss has twenty-and-a-half bays and has a cantilevered walkway at first floor level. Part of its centre bay projects out from the third floor up, and has inserted windows. The main entrance has been altered, and has a first-floor walkway linking it to a car park. The attic is gabled and has an oculus window. The tower is square, its six lower storeys having rounded corners, and the higher ones canted corners. It is topped by a parapet, and on the south side, there is a turret with battlements. Several gantries and hoists have been retained.

== See also ==
- Listed buildings in York (within the city walls, southern part)
