= York Institute of Art, Science and Literature =

Listed building in York, England

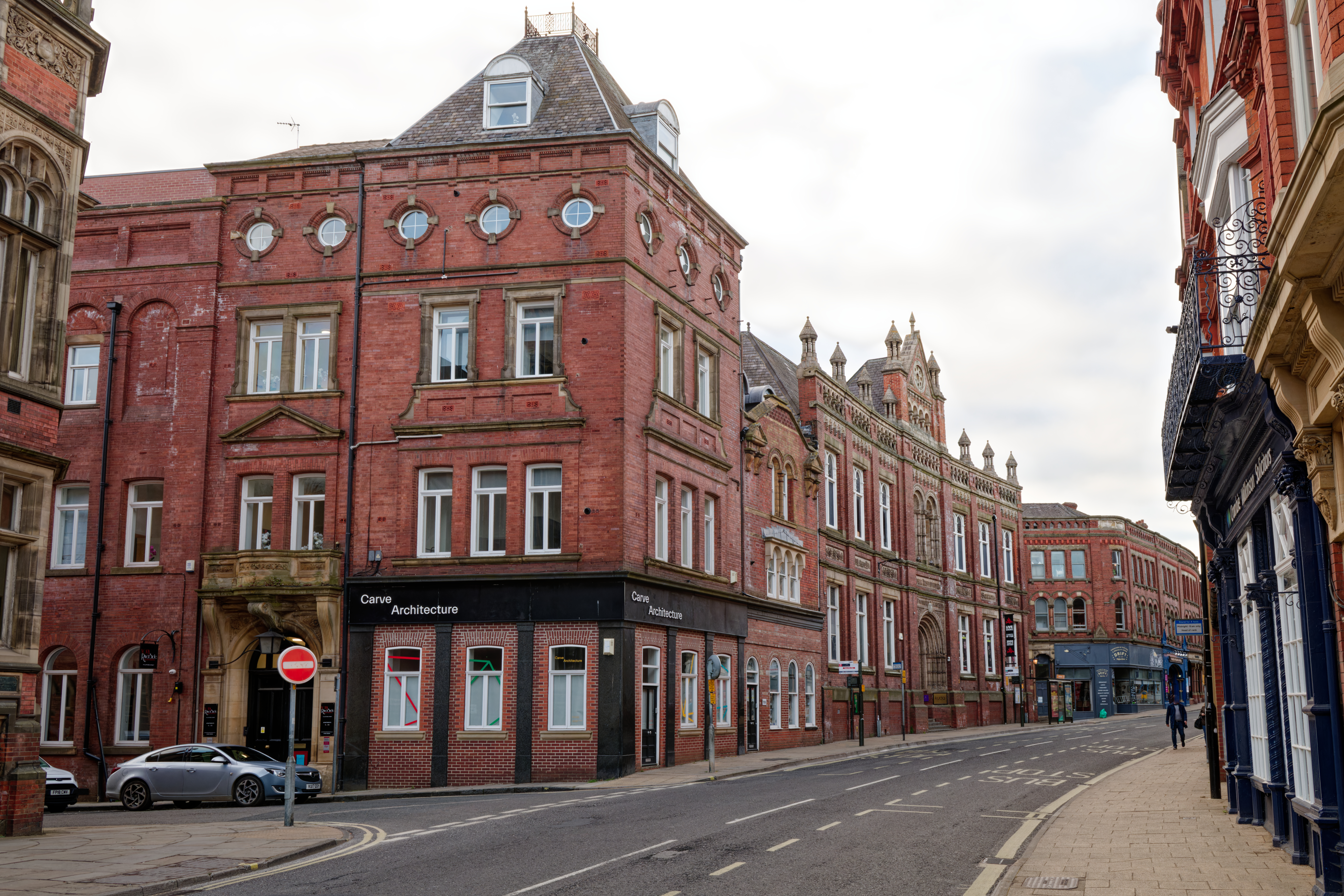
- The building in 2024

General information
- Architectural style: Gothic Revival
- Location: 12 Clifford Street, York, England
- Coordinates: 53°57′24.9″N 1°4′55″W
- Current tenants: York Dungeon
- Groundbreaking: 18 July 1883
- Completed: 1885; 141 years ago
- Opened: 10 June 1885

Height
- Height: 85 feet (26 m)

Design and construction
- Architect: Walter Green Penty

Website
- Official website

Listed Building – Grade II
- Official name: 12, Clifford Street
- Designated: 12 December 1978
- Reference no.: 1259238

York Institute of Art, Science and Literature is a Grade II listed building on Clifford Street in York, England.

== History and architecture ==
The foundation stone for the building was laid by the Prince of Wales on 18 July 1883 in a ceremony of masonic ritual. The architect was Walter Green Penty.

The building was opened by the Marquis of Lorne on 10 June 1885. It was described as having a Romanesque arch as the entrance, supported by columns with carved capitals; surrounding the walls is a parapet crowned with ornamental terminals; and in the centre of the building a tower rises to a height of 85 feet (26 m). The principal frontage is on Clifford Street. The basement contained a gymnasium and two small class rooms. The main floor contained a hall with a capacity of 500 people, and a lecture theatre, class room, two reading rooms, a council room and offices. The first floor contained three more class rooms.

Later in life the building was taken over and used by York Technical College. In November 2023 the building houses Kuda nightclub and York Dungeon.

== See also ==
- Listed buildings in York (within the city walls, southern part)
