= Black Horse, York =

Listed pub in York, England

Black Horse
- The pub in 2023
- Former names: Tap and Spile
- Alternative names: Black Horse Inn

General information
- Type: Public house
- Location: 29 Monkgate, York, England
- Coordinates: 53.9638°N 1.0769°W
- Year built: 1897; 129 years ago
- Client: John Hunt's Brewery
- Owner: Stonegate

Design and construction
- Architect: Walter Green Penty
- Designations

Listed Building – Grade II
- Official name: The Tap and Spile public house
- Designated: 24 June 1983
- Reference no.: 1257200

Website
- theblackhorse-york.co.uk

The Black Horse (officially listed as the Tap and Spile), is a Grade II listed public house with guest rooms on Monkgate in York, England. The present building was rebuilt in 1897 for John Hunt's Brewery, to designs by Walter Green Penty. It traded as the Black Horse, later became the Tap and Spile, and was renamed the Black Horse again in 2014. The site was included in the Central Historic Core conservation area in 1968, and as of August 2025 the freehold is owned by Stonegate.

== History ==
The earliest known reference to the Black Horse public house dates from 1822. The building was rebuilt on Monkgate in 1897 by John Hunt's Brewery, which had purchased the property two years earlier, to the designs of Walter Green Penty. It first traded under the name Black Horse, later became the Tap and Spile, and was renamed the Black Horse again in 2014.

In 1968 the site was included within the newly established Central Historic Core conservation area, and on 24 June 1983 the pub, then trading as the Tap and Spile, was designated a Grade II listed building.

The pub also offers guest accommodation, and as of August 2025, the freehold is owned by Stonegate Pub Company.

== Architecture ==
Entrance detail in 2024

The building is of red brick with painted stone features and a plain tiled roof. It has two storeys and an attic. The front is gabled, with painted stone bands marking the height of the ground and first‑floor window heads; the upper band is shaped to throw off rain. The attic window also has matching lintel and sill bands. The gable has stepped coping with two scroll‑shaped features on each side. Beneath a small open pediment at the centre is a plaque dated 1897.

All windows have leaded glazing and moulded vertical bars. The ground‑floor window has six lights with a transom. On the first floor there are two three‑light windows, each with a transom, and between them is a carved panel showing two cherubs with grapes and the name Black Horse Inn. The attic has a four‑light window.

The doorway, set to the left, has a round arch with a shaped hood mould and recessed doors. A rainwater pipe stands to the left, with a hopper dated 1897. A chimney rises on the right‑hand side wall.

== See also ==
- Listed buildings in York (outside the city walls, northern part)
