= The New Age =

British weekly magazine (1894–1938)

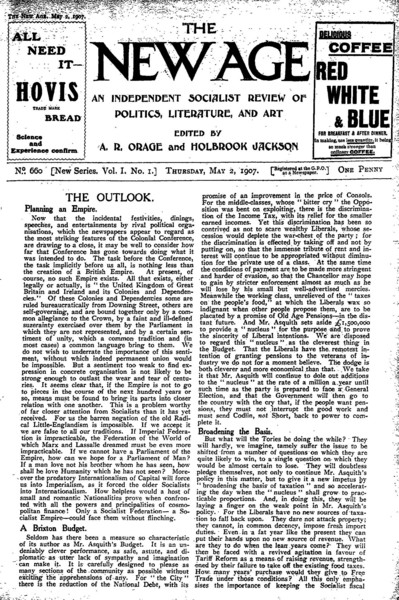
- Issue number 1 of the relaunched publication, 2 May 1907
- Publisher: The New Age Press
- Founded: 1894
- Ceased publication: 1938
- OCLC number: 312975624

The New Age: A Weekly Review of Politics, Literature and Art was a British weekly magazine (1894–1938), credited as a major influence on literature and the arts during its heyday from 1907 to 1922, when it was edited by Alfred Richard Orage. It published work by many of the chief political commentators of the day, such as George Bernard Shaw, H. G. Wells, Hilaire Belloc, G. K. Chesterton and Arnold Bennett.

== History ==
The New Age began life in 1894 as a publication of the Christian socialist movement, but in 1907, as a radical weekly edited by Joseph Clayton, it was struggling. In May of that year, Orage and Holbrook Jackson, who had been running the Leeds Arts Club, took over the journal with financial help from George Bernard Shaw. Jackson acted as co-editor only for the first year, after which Orage edited it alone until he sold it in 1922. By that time his interests had moved towards mysticism, and the quality and circulation of the journal had declined. According to a Brown University press release, "The New Age helped to shape modernism in literature and the arts from 1907 to 1922". It ceased publication in 1938. Orage was also associated with The New English Weekly (1932–1949), as editor, during its first two years of operation (Philip Mairet took over at his death in 1934).

== Content ==
The magazine began as a journal of Christian liberalism and socialism. Orage and Jackson re-oriented it to promote the ideas of Nietzsche, Fabian socialism and later a form of guild socialism. But The New Age did publish opposing viewpoints and arguments, even on issues upon which Orage had strong opinions. Topics covered in detail included:

- the role of private property – in a debate between H. G. Wells and Shaw against G. K. Chesterton and Hilaire Belloc
- the need for a socialist party (as distinct from the newly formed Labour Party)
- women's suffrage

On this last point, the editorial line moved from initial support to bitter opposition by 1912. As The New Age moved away from Fabian politics, the leaders of the Fabian Society, Beatrice and Sydney Webb founded the journal The New Statesman to counter its effect in 1913, and this, combined with the growing distance between Orage and the mainstream left, reduced its influence. By then, the editorial line supported guild socialism, expounded in articles by G. D. H. Cole and S. G. Hobson among others. After World War I, Orage began to support the social credit theory of C. H. Douglas.

The New Age also concerned itself with the definition and development of modernism in the visual arts, literature and music, and consistently observed, reviewed and contributed to the activities of the movement.

The journal became one of the first places in England in which Sigmund Freud's ideas were discussed before the First World War, in particular by David Eder, an early British psychoanalyst.

== Production ==
The journal appeared weekly, and featured a wide cross-section of writers with an interest in literature and the arts, but also politics, spiritualism and economics.

With its woodprint illustrations reminiscent of artwork by the German Expressionists, its mixture of culture, politics, Nietzschean philosophy and spiritualism, and its non-standard appearance, The New Age has been cited as the English equivalent of the German Expressionist periodical Der Sturm, a journal to which it bore a striking resemblance.

== Notable contributors ==
- Boris Anrep
- Michael Arlen (Dikran Kouyoumdjian)
- Belfort Bax
- Hilaire Belloc
- Arnold Bennett
- Cecil Chesterton
- G. K. Chesterton
- G. D. H. Cole
- C. H. Douglas
- Arthur Kitson
- David Eder
- Havelock Ellis
- Florence Farr
- Eric Gill
- Beatrice Hastings
- T. E. Hulme
- Herbert Hughes
- Holbrook Jackson
- Oscar Levy
- Anthony Ludovici
- Hugh MacDiarmid
- Ramiro de Maeztu
- Katherine Mansfield
- Dimitrije Mitrinovic
- Edwin Muir
- P. D. Ouspensky
- Alfred Orage
- A. J. Penty
- Marmaduke Pickthall
- Ezra Pound
- Herman George Scheffauer
- Hugh Pembroke Vowles
- H. G. Wells
- Herbert Read
- Clifford Sharp
- Kaikhosru Shapurji Sorabji
- George Bernard Shaw
- Walter Sickert
