= Monkgate =

Street in York, England

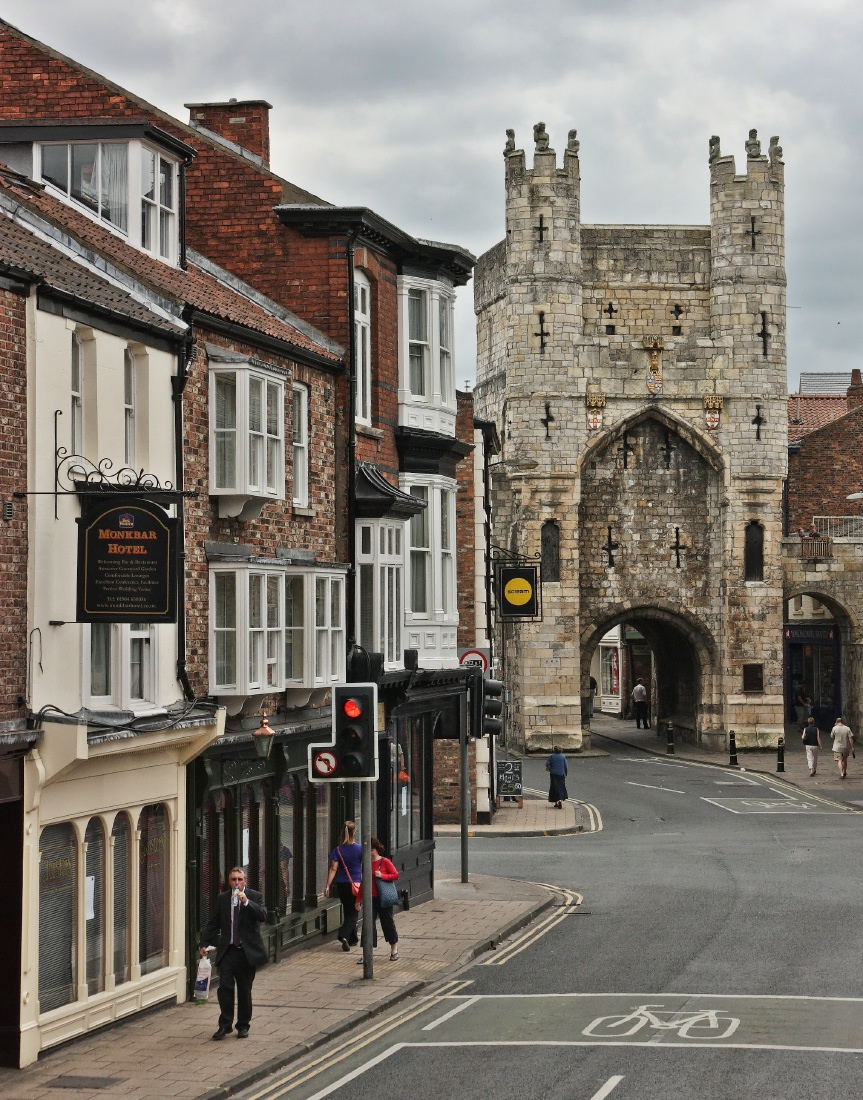
- View south-west on Monkgate, towards Monk Bar
- Location within York
- Location: York, England
- Coordinates: 53.9638°N 1.0763°W
- North east end: Coppergate; High Ousegate; Parliament Street; Piccadilly
- Major junctions: Lord Mayor's Walk; St Maurice's Road
- South west end: Heworth Green; Huntington Road; Foss Bank

Monkgate is a street in York, England, running north-east from the city centre.

== History ==
The street roughly follows the line of a Roman road from Eboracum to Derventio. Its starting point was the Porta Principalis Sinistra of the Roman walls, now Monk Bar on the current York city walls. The name "Monkgate" was first recorded in about 1075, referring to monks attached to York Minster. A Hospital of St Loy may have existed on the street near Monk Bridge, but a leper hospital was definitely present by 1380, and in 1396 a Maison Dieu was built, surviving until about 1610.

In the 12th century, St Maurice's Church was constructed on the street, and the city's Jewish cemetery was also located there. The area became built up but was devastated during the Siege of York in 1644, and all current buildings date from after this period. The Thomas Agar Hospital almshouse, built in 1631, appears to have survived the siege but was demolished in 1879.

The York County Hospital was established on the street in 1740 and moved into a large building set back from the road in 1851. In 1754, the Grey Coat School for girls was built, and from 1803 until 1840 Manchester College was based on the street, its buildings later becoming St John's College. In the 18th and 19th centuries, the street was a prosperous residential area, with most of its buildings dating from these centuries. However, the surrounding area became increasingly industrial, and its prosperity declined. St Maurice's Church was demolished in 1878, and its replacement was demolished in 1967, although the cemetery survives. The trees which once lined the street have largely been removed.

Despite this, the City of York Council states that Monkgate has "retained its charm" and is "not as congested or noisy as some other city approaches". Near Monk Bar, it has independent shops and other commercial uses, including a health centre and jobcentre, while it is more residential further out.

== Layout and architecture ==
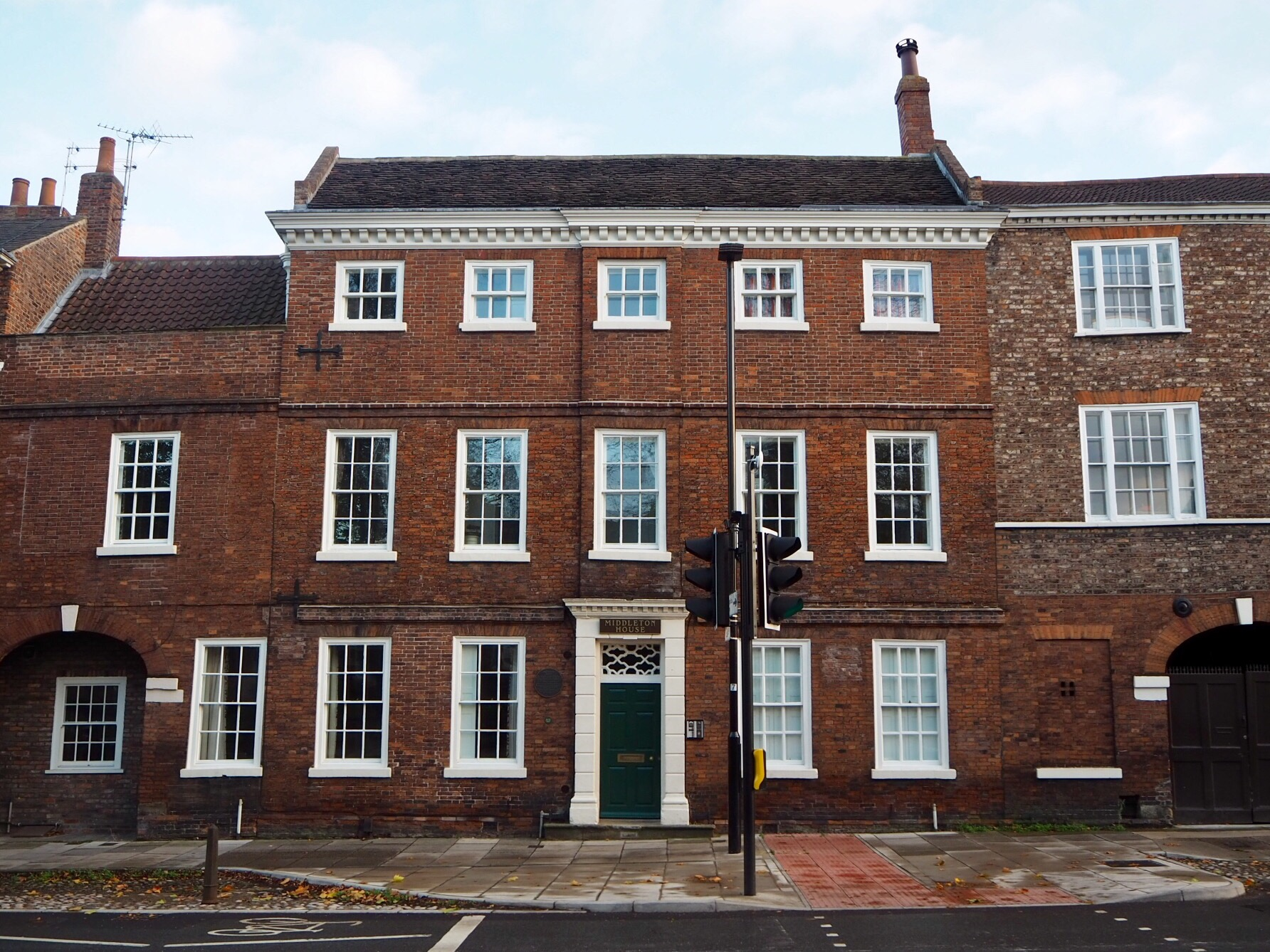
Middleton House

The street runs north-east from Monk Bar, continuing the line of Goodramgate. It terminates at a roundabout where it meets Heworth Green, Huntington Road and Foss Bank, by Monk Bridge over the River Foss. On the south-east side, it has junctions with St Maurice's Road, Agar Street, and Monkgate Cloisters, which leads to the former hospital. On the north-west side, it meets Lord Mayor's Walk and Penley's Grove Street.

Notable buildings on the north-west side of the street include Nos. 1 and 3, built in 1846; the mid-19th-century No. 5; Nos. 19 and 21, built in 1812; the Black Horse pub at No. 29, formerly the Tap and Spile; No. 37, built around 1847 with remains from 1794; No. 39, built in 1794; Nos. 45–51, a row of houses built between 1830 and 1840; No. 55, built about 1812; Nos. 57 and 59, from around 1835; the early-19th-century No. 65; and Nos. 67 and 69, a pair of houses built between 1812 and 1814;

On the south-east side, buildings include No. 2, a shop built around 1865; the Bay Horse pub at No. 4, built about 1820, with an ice house behind it; No. 28, built around 1840; No. 30, from about 1835; the mid-19th-century County House at No. 32; No. 36, completed in 1798; the Grade II*-listed Middleton House at No. 38, built about 1700; the early-18th-century No. 40; No. 42, built by George Hudson in 1828; Monkgate House at No. 44, built around 1723; the late-18th-century No. 46 and No. 48; Nos. 54–58 from 1840; and Nos. 62–66, a terrace built around 1840.
