= Holbrook Jackson =

English journalist, writer, socialist activist and publisher

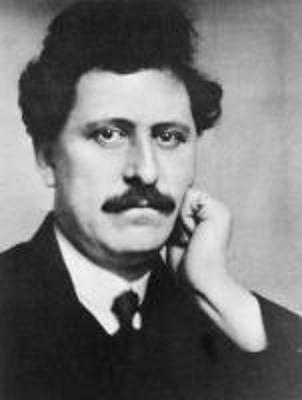
- Holbrook Jackson in 1913
- Born: George Holbrook Jackson; 31 December 1874; Liverpool, England
- Died: 16 June 1948 (aged 73); Bournemouth, Hampshire, England
- Occupations: Journalist, writer and publisher
- Known for: All Manner of Folk, Interpretations and Studies; The Eighteen Nineties: A Review of Art and Ideas at the Close of the Nineteenth Century; The Anatomy of Bibliomania; Bookman's Pleasure: A Recreation for Booklovers
- Spouse: Frances Jones Jackson
- Children: Gwendolen

George Holbrook Jackson (31 December 1874 – 16 June 1948) was a British journalist, writer and publisher. He was recognised as one of the leading bibliophiles of his time.

== Biography ==
Holbrook Jackson was born in Liverpool, England. He worked as a clerk, while freelancing as a writer. Around 1900 he was in the lace trade in Leeds, where he met A. R. Orage; together they founded the Leeds Arts Club. At that time Jackson was a Fabian socialist, but also influenced by Nietzsche. It was Jackson who introduced Orage to Nietzsche, lending him a copy of Thus Spoke Zarathustra in 1900.

Later they separately moved to London as journalists. In 1906, shortly after arriving in the capital, Jackson suggested founding a similar group to the Leeds Arts Club, the Fabian Arts Group. This eventually led to a split from the Fabian Society, whose interest was economic and political. In 1907, Jackson and Orage bought The New Age, a struggling Christian Socialist weekly magazine, with financing from Lewis Wallace and George Bernard Shaw.

Initially Jackson and Orage co-edited, with Jackson setting the editorial line with Cecil Chesterton and Clifford Sharp (later the editor of the New Statesman). In 1908 Jackson left and Orage continued as sole editor. Around this time, Orage's wife left him for Jackson, but refused to divorce Orage.

From 1911 Jackson had an editorial position on T. P. O'Connor's T.P.'s Weekly, a newspaper with a strong literary emphasis. He took over as editor from Wilfred Whitten in 1914. Later he bought the publication, and converted it into his own literary magazine, To-Day, which was published 1917 to 1923, when it merged with Life and Letters.

At the same period he set up in 1912 or 1913 the Flying Fame Press, with the poet Ralph Hodgson and designer Claud Lovat Fraser. This was the beginning of a long association with small press and the worlds of typography and book collecting, on which he wrote extensively. He was in the short-lived Fleuron Society (1923) with Stanley Morison, Francis Meynell, Bernard Newdigate and Oliver Simon. He did more, as a patron of the Pelican Press amongst others, to encourage the raising of production standards of books.

After World War I, Jackson introduced Orage to C. H. Douglas, who subsequently wrote economics articles for The New Age, expounding his theory of Social Credit.

== In popular culture ==
James Joyce singled out Jackson to Sylvia Beach as someone who "resembles" Leopold Bloom. The photo that Joyce dismissed as "not a good likeness" is online.

== Works ==
=== By Holbrook Jackson ===
- Edward Fitzgerald and Omar Khayyam: an Essay and Bibliography (1899)
- The Eternal Now (1900)
- Everychild: a Book of Verses (1903)
- Bernard Shaw (1907)
- Great English Novelists (1908) essays
- William Morris: Craftsman-Socialist (1908)
- Romance and Reality: Essays and Studies (1911)
- Platitudes in the Making (1911)
- Great Soldiers (1911) as George Henry Hart (?)
- All Manner of Folk, Interpretations and Studies (1912) essays
- Town: An Essay (1913)
- The Eighteen Nineties: A Review of Art and Ideas at the Close of the Nineteenth Century (1913)
- Southward Ho! and Other Essays (1914) compilation
- Contingent Ditties. and Other Soldier Songs of the Great War by Frank S. Brown (1915) editor
- Southward Ho! and Other Essays (1914) compilation
- Occasions (1922) essays
- Brief Survey Of Printing History & Practice (Kynoch Press 1923) with Stanley Morison
- Private Presses in England (1923)
- William Morris (1926)
- The Bibliophile's Almanack for 1927 (The Fleuron 1927) with Harold Child, Osbert Sitwell, W.J. Turner and Frank Sidgwick
- Essays of To-day and Yesterday (1929) with Philip Guedalla, Allan Monkhouse, Ivor Brown
- The Anatomy of Bibliomania (Soncino Press, 1930)
- The Fear of Books (Soncino Press, 1932)
- William Morris and the Arts and Crafts. (Oriole Press 1934)
- Maxims of Books and Reading (1934)
- Three Papers on William Morris (Shenval Press 1934) with Graily Hewitt and James Shand
- A Cross-Section of English Printing : The Curwen Press 1918–1934 (Curwen Press 1935)
- The Early History of the Double Crown Club (1935)
- Opening Speech at an Exhibition of Percy Smith's Typographical work (First Edition Club, 1935)
- Of the Uses of Books (1937)
- Shopping and Taste: a lecture (1937)
- The Printing of Books (1938)
- The Aesthetics of Printing. (1939)
- The Story of Don Vincente (Corvinus Press 1939)
- Bookman's Holiday: A Recreation for Booklovers (Faber & Faber 1945)
- The Reading of Books (Faber and Faber 1946)
- The Hunting of Books (1947)
- The Complete Nonsense of Edward Lear (Faber & Faber, 1947)
- On Art and Socialism. Essays and Lectures by William Morris (John Lehmann, 1947) editor
- Dreamers of Dreams: The Rise and Fall of 19th Century Idealism (Faber & Faber, 1948) essays
- Pleasures of Reading (1948)
- Typophily (1954) reprinted essay
- William Caxton (the first English printer) (Oriole Press, 1959)
- Sanctuary of Printing: the Record Room at the University Press, Oxford
- Thoughts on Book Design (1968) with Paul Valery and Stanley Morison
- Platitudes Undone: a Facsimile Edition of Holbrook Jackson's "Platitudes in the Making" With Original Handwritten Responses by G. K. Chesterton (Ignatius Press 1997)

=== About Holbrook Jackson ===
- Sir Francis Meynell, The Holbrook Jackson Library: A Memorial Catalogue with an Appreciation, Bishop's Stortford: Elkin Mathews, 1951 (Elkin Mathews Catalogue 119)
