= Alfred Richard Orage =

British literary figure (1873–1934)

Alfred R. Orage
- Born: 22 January 1873; Dacre, West Riding of Yorkshire, England
- Died: 6 November 1934 (aged 61); London, England
- Occupations: teacher, lecturer, writer, editor, publisher
- Known for: Editor of The New Age
- Spouses: Jean Walker (m. 1896; div. 1927) Jessie Richards Dwight (m. 1927)
- Children: 2

Alfred Richard Orage (Note: His family name was pronounced locally as if written "Orridge" (/ˈɒrɪdʒ/). The man himself preferred a French-like pronunciation: /oʊˈrɑːʒ/. The British may prefer the former variant; Americans, the latter.) (22 January 1873 – 6 November 1934) was a British influential figure in socialist politics and modernist culture, now best known for editing the magazine The New Age before the First World War. While he was working as a schoolteacher in Leeds he pursued various interests, including Plato, the Independent Labour Party and theosophy. In 1900, he met Holbrook Jackson and three years later they co-founded the Leeds Arts Club, which became a centre of modernist culture in Britain. After 1924, Orage went to France to work with George Gurdjieff and was then sent to the United States by Gurdjieff to raise funds and lecture. He translated several of Gurdjieff's works.

== Early life and education ==
James Alfred Orage was born in Dacre, near Harrogate in the West Riding of Yorkshire, son of Nonconformist parents William Orage and Sarah Anne (née McQuire) who was "believed to have been of Irish descent". After marrying Sarah, "a fatherless girl, living with her mother", William Orage had "fecklessly drank" and gambled away his inheritance, a "little farm in Cambridgeshire" near his home village of Fenstanton, Huntingdonshire. A move to Dacre, where he "took up schoolmastering", had failed to improve his fortunes. Alfred had one sister. He was generally known as Dickie and he eventually dropped the name James and adopted the middle name Alfred as his first name, and Richard as his second. His father died when he was one year old and his mother, who had little financial means (particularly owing to the collapse of the firm of lawyers responsible for the annuity of £50 William had left the family), returned to the Orage family's home village of Fenstanton. They were "decently, grindingly poor"; Sarah took in laundry to make ends meet and Alfred had to work as a farm labourer from the age of ten. Fortunately, Howard Coote, son of the local squire, went to see his father and the local schoolmaster, all of them agreeing it "a thousand pities to try to make a ploughboy of Alfred". Accordingly, Coote paid Sarah a "peppercorn allowance" that kept Alfred at school. Alfred excelled in his studies, and was sent to Culham training college in Oxfordshire where he also taught himself editorial skills and obtained a teaching post in Leeds, returning to Yorkshire in autumn 1893.

== Leeds: socialism, theosophy and the Leeds Arts Club ==
In 1894, Orage became a schoolteacher at an elementary school in Leeds and helped to found the Leeds branch of the Independent Labour Party (ILP). He wrote a weekly literary column for the ILP's paper, the Labour Leader, from 1895 to 1897. He brought a philosophical outlook to the paper, including in particular the thought of Plato and the theosophist Edward Carpenter, who was Orage's mentor for a time. Orage devoted seven years of study to Plato, from 1893 to 1900. He set up a philosophical discussion circle called the Plato Group, including the architect Thomas Butler Wilson who was a friend of Alfred's future wife, Jean.

By the late 1890s, Orage was disillusioned with conventional socialism and turned for a while to theosophy. In 1896, Orage married Jean Walker, an art student at the Royal College of Art who was a passionate member of the Theosophical Society. The couple frequented the Northern Federation headquarters in Harrogate where Orage first met Annie Besant and other leading theosophists and began to lecture on mysticism, occultism, and idealism in Manchester and Leeds as well as publishing material in the Theosophical Review. Orage was influenced by Edward Carpenter's belief that women were behind the new force that would bring change to society. Alfred and Jean opened a theosophist branch in Leeds called the Alpha Centre, even though a regular lodge already existed in the city, and Jean represented it in Harrogate until 1900 when the Leeds lodge was re-founded by the Orages as well as Jean's cousin, A. K. Kennedy. Jean lectured at the Northern Federation Conference in 1904. Jean also helped Alfred with the council meetings of the Leeds lodge. Jean was an excellent needlewoman and sharp debater; she finally left Alfred to pursue her textile career in Haslemere and later working on the looms for William Morris's firm in Oxford Street, London.

In 1900, he met Holbrook Jackson in a Leeds bookshop and lent him a copy of the Bhagavad-Gita. In return, Jackson lent him Friedrich Nietzsche's Thus Spoke Zarathustra, which led Orage to study Nietzsche's work in depth. Orage devoted seven years of his life to the study of Nietzsche's philosophy, from 1900 to 1907, and, from 1907 to 1914, he was a student of the Mahabharata.

In 1903, Orage, Jackson, and the architect Arthur J. Penty helped to found the Leeds Arts Club with the intention of promoting the work of radical thinkers including George Bernard Shaw, whom Orage had met in 1898, Henrik Ibsen, and Nietzsche. During this period, Orage returned to socialist platforms, but by 1906, he was determined to combine Carpenter's socialism with Nietzsche's thought and theosophy.

In 1906, Beatrice Hastings became a regular contributor to the New Age. By 1907, she and Orage had developed an intimate relationship. As Hastings herself later put it, "Aphrodite amused herself at our expense". Orage appears to have had a magnetic effect on many women who frequented his lectures; both Mary Gawthorpe and Millie Price have left accounts of their sexual relationships with him.

Orage explored his new ideas in several books. He saw Nietzsche's Übermensch as a metaphor for the "higher state of consciousness" sought by mystics and attempted to define a route to this higher state, insisting that it must involve a rejection of civilisation and conventional morality. He moved through a celebration of Dionysus to declare that he was in favour, not of an ordered socialism, but of an anarchic movement.

Between 1906 and 1907, Orage published three books: Consciousness: Animal, Human and Superhuman, based on his experience with theosophy; Friedrich Nietzsche: The Dionysian Spirit of the Age; and Nietzsche in Outline and Aphorism. Orage's rational critique of theosophy evoked an editorial rebuttal from The Theosophical Review and, in 1907, he terminated his association with the Theosophical Society. The two books on Nietzsche were the first systematic introductions to Nietzschean thought to be published in Britain.

== Editor in London ==
In 1906, Orage resigned his teaching post and moved to London, following Penty there. In London, Orage attempted to form a league for the restoration of the guild system, in the spirit of the decentralised socialism of William Morris. The failure of this project spurred him to buy the weekly magazine The New Age in 1907, in partnership with Holbrook Jackson and with the support of Shaw. Orage transformed the magazine to fit with his conception of a forum for politics, literature, and the arts. Although many contributors were Fabians, he distanced himself from their politics to some extent and sought to have the magazine represent a wide range of political views. He used the magazine to launch attacks on parliamentary politics and argued the need for utopianism. He also attacked trade union leadership, while offering some support to syndicalism, and tried to combine syndicalism with his ideal of a revived guild system. Combining these two ideas resulted in guild socialism, the political philosophy Orage began to argue for from about 1910, though the specific term "guild socialism" seems not to have been mentioned in print until Bertrand Russell referred to it in his book Political Ideals (1917).

Between 1908 and 1914, The New Age was the premier little magazine in Britain. It was instrumental in pioneering the British avant-garde, from vorticism to imagism, and its contributors included T.E. Hulme, Wyndham Lewis, Katherine Mansfield, Ezra Pound and Herbert Read. Orage's success as an editor was connected with his talent as a conversationalist and a "bringer together" of people. The modernists of London had been scattered between 1905 and 1910, but, largely thanks to Orage, a sense of a modernist "movement" was created from 1910 onwards.

== Politics ==
Orage declared himself a socialist and followed Georges Sorel in arguing that trade unions should pursue an increasingly aggressive policy on wage deals and working conditions. He approved of the increasing militancy of the unions in the era before the First World War and seems to have shared Sorel's belief in the necessity of a union-led general strike leading to a revolutionary situation. For Orage, economic power precedes political power, and political reform is useless without economic reform.

In the early issues of The New Age, Orage supported the women's suffrage movement, but he became increasingly hostile to it as the Women's Social and Political Union became more prominent and more militant. Pro-suffragette articles were not published after 1910, but heated debate on the subject took place in the correspondence columns.

During the First World War, Orage defended what he saw as the interests of the working class. On 6 August 1914, he wrote in Notes of the Week in The New Age: "We believe that England is necessary to Socialism, as Socialism is necessary to the world." On 14 November 1918, Orage wrote of the coming peace settlement, embodied in the Treaty of Versailles: "The next world war, if unhappily there should be another, will in all probability be contained within the clauses and conditions attaching to the present peace settlement."

By then, Orage was convinced that the hardships of the working class were the result of the monetary policies of banks and governments. If Britain could remove the pound from the gold standard during the War and re-establish the gold standard after, the gold standard was not as necessary as the monetary oligarchs wanted the proletariat to believe that it was. On 15 July 1920, Orage wrote: "We should be the first to admit that the subject of Money is difficult to understand. It is 'intended' to be, by the minute oligarchy that governs the world by means of it."

After the War, Orage was influenced by C. H. Douglas and became a supporter of the social credit movement. On 2 January 1919, Orage published the first article by Douglas to appear in The New Age, "A Mechanical View of Economics".

== With Gurdjieff ==
Orage had met P. D. Ouspensky for the first time in 1914. Ouspensky's ideas had left a lasting impression and, when Ouspensky moved to London in 1921, Orage began attending his lectures on "Fragments of an Unknown Teaching", the basis of his book In Search of the Miraculous. From this time onwards Orage became less and less interested in literature and art, and instead focused most of his attention on mysticism. His correspondence with Harry Houdini on this subject moved him to explore ideas of the afterlife. He returned to the idea that there are absolute truths and concluded that they are embodied in the Mahabharata.

In February 1922, Ouspensky introduced Orage to G. I. Gurdjieff. Orage sold The New Age and moved to Paris to study at the Institute for the Harmonious Development of Man. In 1924, Gurdjieff appointed him to lead study groups in the United States, which he did for seven years. Soon after Gurdjieff arrived in New York from France on 13 November 1930, he deposed Orage and disbanded his study groups, believing that Orage had been teaching them incorrectly; they had been working under the misconception that self-observation could be practised in the absence of self-remembering or in the presence of negative emotions. Members were allowed to continue their studies with Gurdjieff himself, after taking an oath not to communicate with Orage. Upon hearing that Orage had also signed the oath, Gurdjieff wept. Gurdjieff had once considered Orage as a friend and brother, and thought of Jessie as a bad choice for a mate. Orage was a chain smoker and Jessie was a heavy drinker. In the privately published third series of his writings, Gurdjieff wrote of Orage and his wife Jessie: "his romance had ended in his marrying the saleswoman of 'Sunwise Turn,' a young American pampered out of all proportion to her position…"

Orage, Ouspensky, and King emphasised certain aspects of the Gurdjieff System while ignoring others. According to Gurdjieff, Orage emphasised self-observation. In Harlem, Jean Toomer, one of Orage's students at Greenwich Village, used Gurdjieff's work to confront the problem of racism.

In 1927, Orage's first wife, Jean, granted him a divorce and in September he married Jessie Richards Dwight (1901–1985), the co-owner of The Sunwise Turn bookshop where Orage first lectured on the Gurdjieff System. Orage and Jessie had two children, Richard and Ann. While they were in New York, Orage and his wife often catered to celebrities such as Paul Robeson, fresh from his London tour. In 1930, Orage returned to England and, in 1931, he began publishing the New English Weekly. He remained in London until his death on 6 November 1934.

The Orages sailed back to New York from England on the S.S. Washington on 29 December 1930, and arrived on 8 January 1931. The next day, while they were staying at the Irving Hotel, Orage wrote a letter to Gurdjieff unveiling a plan for the publication of All and Everything before the end of the year and promising a substantial amount of money. At lunch in New York City on 21 February 1931, Achmed Abdulla, a.k.a. Nadir Kahn, told the Orages that he had met Gurdjieff in Tibet and that Gurdjieff had been known there as "Lama Dordjieff", a Tsarist agent and tutor to the Dalai Lama. Orage also helped Gurdjieff to translate Meetings with Remarkable Men from Russian to English, but it was not published in their lifetimes.

== Last years ==
In London, Orage became involved in politics again through the social credit movement. He returned to New York on 8 January 1931 in an attempt to meet Gurdjieff's new demands, but he told his wife that he would not be teaching the Gurdjieff System to any group past the end of the spring. Orage was on the pier on 13 March 1931 to bid Gurdjieff farewell on his way back to France and the Orages sailed back to England on 3 July.

In April 1932, Orage founded a new journal, The New English Weekly. Dylan Thomas's first published poem, "And Death Shall Have No Dominion", appeared in its issue dated 18 May 1933, but by then, the magazine was not selling well and Orage was experiencing financial difficulties.

In September 1933, Jessie gave birth to their daughter, Ann. In January 1934, Senator Bronson M. Cutting presented Orage's Social Credit Plan to the United States Senate, proposing that it become one of the tools of Roosevelt's economic policy.

At the beginning of August 1934, Gurdjieff asked Orage to prepare a new edition of The Herald of Coming Good. On 20 August, Orage wrote his last letter to Gurdjieff: "Dear Mr Gurdjieff, I've found very little to revise…"

Towards the end of his life, Orage suffered from severe pain below the heart. This ailment had been diagnosed a couple of years before as simply functional and he did not again seek medical advice. While he was broadcasting a speech as part of the BBC series, "Poverty in Plenty", once again expounding the doctrine of social credit, he experienced excruciating pain, but he continued as if nothing was happening. After leaving the studio he spent the evening with his wife and friends and made plans to see the doctor next day, but he died in his sleep that night. Orage's former students of the Gurdjieff System arranged for the enneagram to be inscribed on his tombstone.

== Works ==
- Friedrich Nietzsche: The Dionysian Spirit of the Age (1906)
- Nietzsche in Outline & Aphorism (1907)
- National Guilds: An Inquiry into the Wage System and the Way Out (1914) editor; a collection of articles from The New Age
- An Alphabet of Economics (1918)
- An Englishman Talks It Out With an Irishman (Dublin: The Talbot Press; London: T. Fisher Unwin, 1918)
- Readers and Writers (1917–1921) (1922) as RHC
- Psychological Exercises and Essays (1930)
- The Art of Reading (1930)
- The 1931 Manuscript of Beelzebub's Tales to His Grandson (1931); translated and edited by Alfred Richard Orage
- On Love: Freely Adapted from the Tibetan (Unicorn Press 1932)
- Selected Essays and Critical Writings (1935) edited by Herbert Read and Denis Saurat
- Political and Economic Writings from 'The New English Weekly', 1932-34, with a Preliminary Section from 'The New Age' 1912 (1936), edited by Montgomery Butchart, with the advice of Maurice Colbourne, T. S. Eliot, Philip Mairet, Will Dyson and others
- Essays and Aphorisms (1954)
- The Active Mind: Adventures in Awareness (1954)
- Orage as Critic (1974), edited by Wallace Martin
- Consciousness: Animal, Human and Superman (1978)
- A. R. Orage's Commentaries on Gurdjieff's "All and Everything", edited by C. S. Nott
