= Bridges of York =

Bridges over the Ouse and Foss in York, England

Coordinates: 53°56′41.33″N 1°4′55.42″W

There are nine bridges across the River Ouse and eighteen smaller bridges and passages across the narrower River Foss within the city of York, England.

== Bridges over the Ouse ==
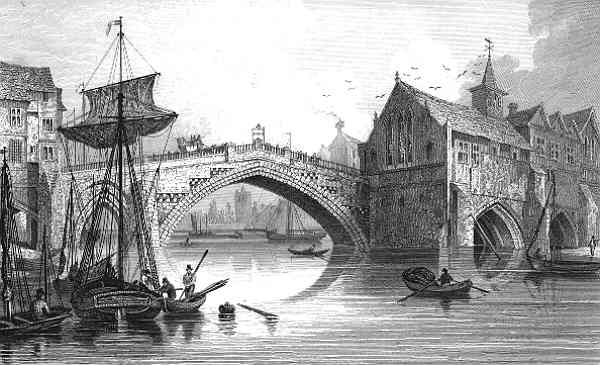
An engraving of the fourth Ouse Bridge (1565–1810)

The earliest bridge, built by the Romans, linked Stonegate (the via praetoria of the Roman fortress) with Micklegate, crossing the river approximately where the Guildhall now is. Its replacement, Ouse Bridge, was a wooden bridge built about 380 yards (350 m) downstream by the Vikings. It has been rebuilt three times, most recently between 1810 and 1820. The Scarborough Railway Bridge of 1845 was the third to be built and was followed by two more road bridges, Lendal Bridge in 1863 and Skeldergate Bridge in 1882. The Millennium Bridge, a footbridge, was added in 2001. There are also Clifton Bridge in the northern suburbs of the city, two modern fly-overs carrying the outer ring road, and the former railway bridge at Naburn, which is now part of the York-Selby cycle path.

North to south, the bridges are:

Bridge	Built	Type
A1237 – Outer Ring Road, Western and Northern	1987	Road
Clifton Bridge	1963	Road
Scarborough Railway Bridge	1844	Rail and pedestrian
Lendal Bridge	1863	Road
Ouse Bridge	1821	Road
Skeldergate Bridge	1881	Road
Millennium Bridge	2001	Pedestrian
A64 – Outer Ring Road, Southern and Eastern	1976	Road
Naburn railway bridge	1871	Pedestrian

=== Clifton Bridge (1963) ===
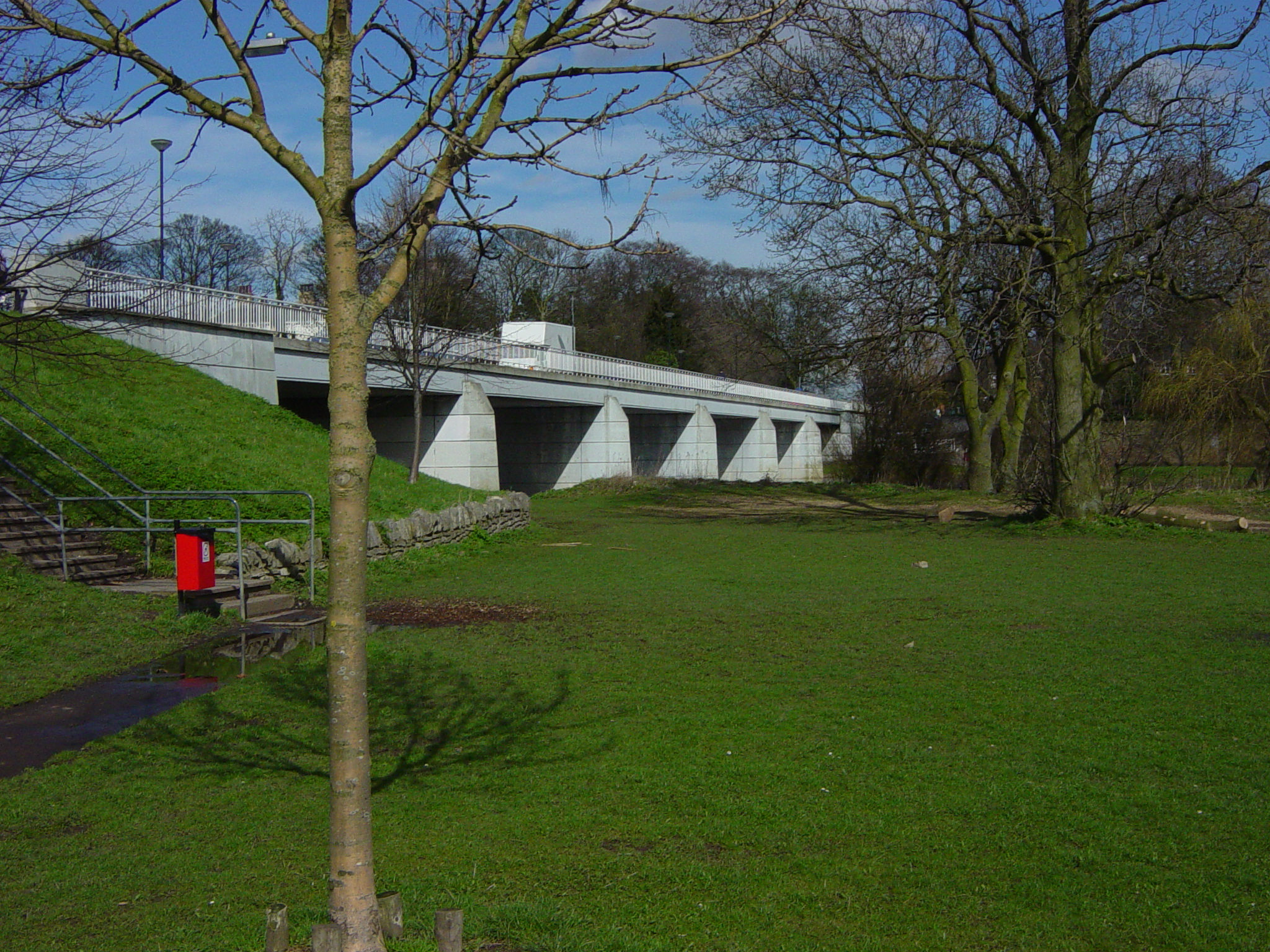
The modernistic Clifton Bridge

A temporary bridge over the River Ouse at Clifton was built by the British Army in 1961 on the site of an old ferry crossing to handle additional vehicle traffic caused by the wedding of the Duke and Duchess of Kent at York Minster. A permanent bridge was opened officially on 28 October 1963. The bridge is built from 4,000 tons of concrete and 50 tons of reinforced steel.

=== Scarborough Railway Bridge (1845) ===
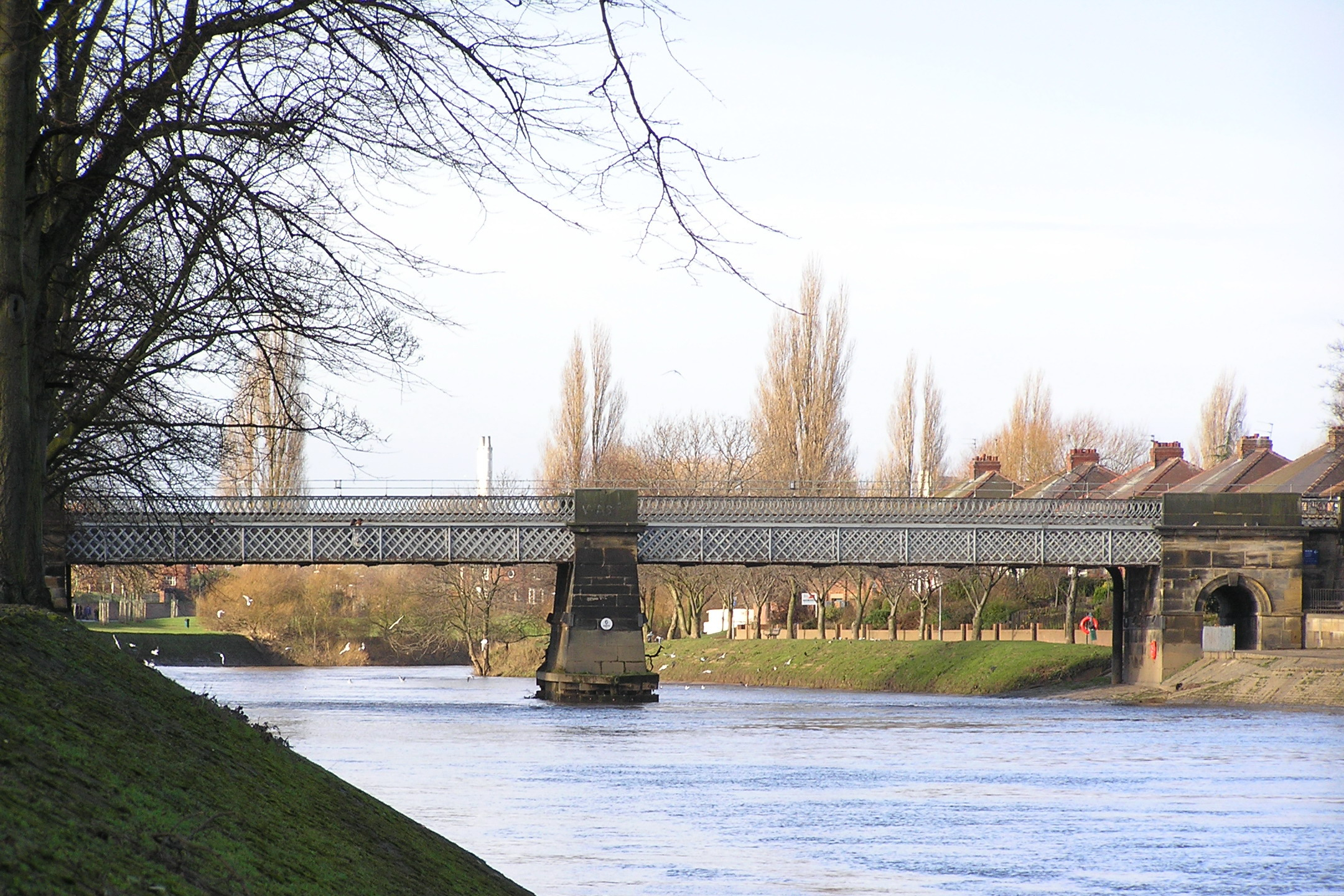
Scarborough Railway Bridge from the South Bank, looking upstream

The second bridge across the Ouse was the Scarborough Bridge, built in 1845 to carry the railway line between York and Scarborough (now the Scarborough branch of the North TransPennine route). Originally it had two tracks with a pedestrian path in between them. In 1875, the track was raised 4 feet (1.2 m) and the footpath moved to the south side. This bridge had a £6 million renovation in 2015 with the main decks being completely replaced. The narrow footpath, with steps on either side was removed in 2019 and replaced with a much wider bridge suitable for pedestrians and cyclists. It has created a car-free route between the railway station and the city centre and users of National Cycle Network route 65 no longer have to carry their bikes across the bridge. The bridge reopened to the public on 18 April 2019 with work continuing on steps and sections of ramps.

The Lendal Bridge (1863) spans the River Ouse at York, with the Lendal Tower on the left - 2026. 02.

=== Lendal Bridge (1863) ===
The Lendal Bridge (1863) spans the River Ouse at York, with the Lendal Tower on the left - 2026.

The Lendal Bridge (1863) spans the River Ouse at York - 2026.

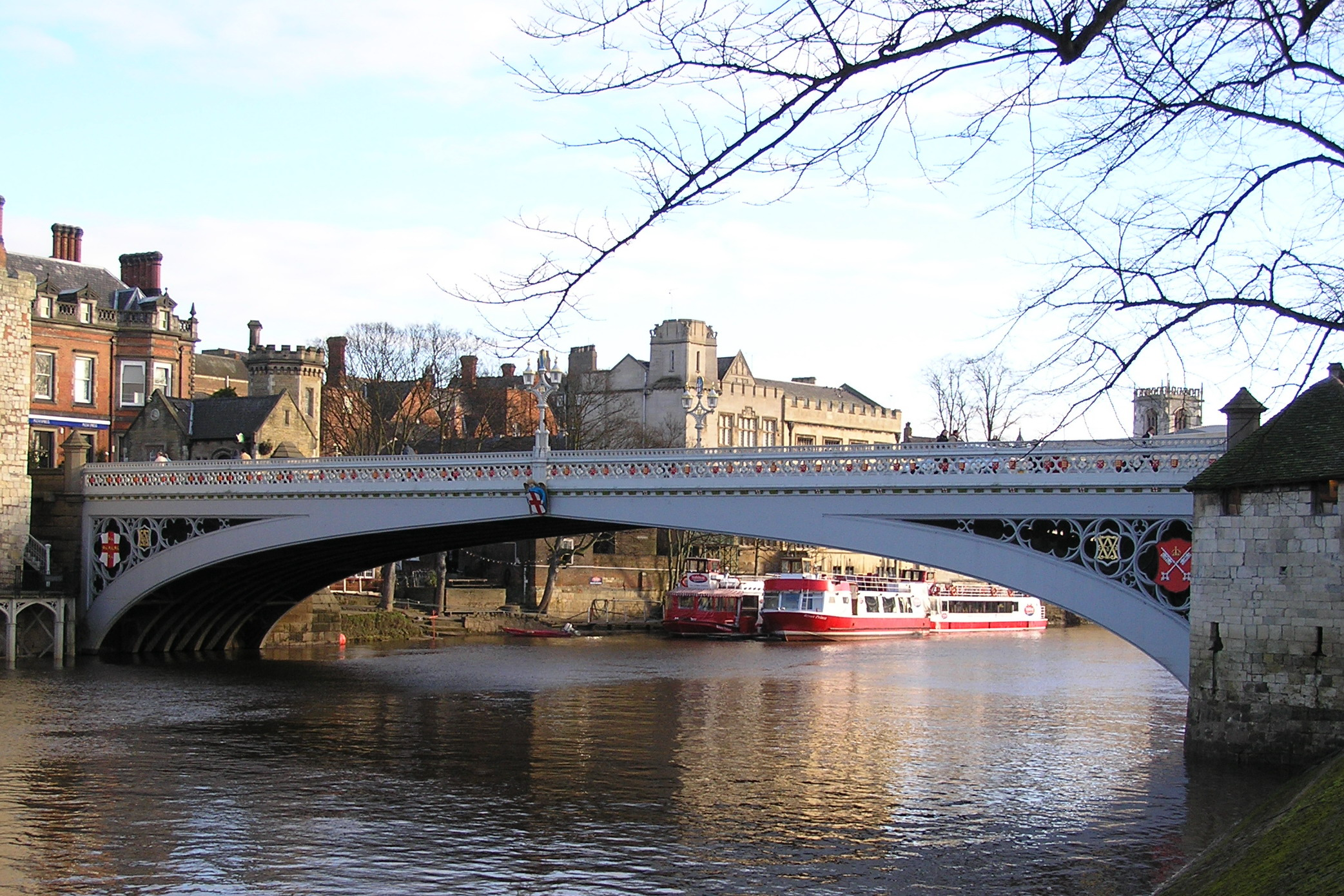
Lendal Bridge from the South Bank, looking downstream

Lendal Bridge stands on the site of a former rope-ferry where the city walls break for the River Ouse. This was the ferry used by Florence Nightingale when she visited York en route to Castle Howard in 1852.

The bridge connects two medieval towers: Lendal Tower on the east bank and Barker Tower on the west bank. It was designed by civil engineer Thomas Page, who also designed London's Westminster Bridge. It is made of cast iron, and has a single span of 175 feet (53 m).

Lendal Bridge and York Improvement Act 1847
- Act of Parliament
- Parliament of the United Kingdom
- Long title: An Act for building a Bridge across the River Ouse in the City of York, with Approaches thereto, and for widening, altering, and improving certain Streets or Thoroughfares within the said City; and for other Purposes.
- Citation: 10 & 11 Vict. c. ccv

Dates
- Royal assent: 9 July 1847
Other legislation
Repealed by	York Corporation Act 1969

Status: Repealed

Text of statute as originally enacted

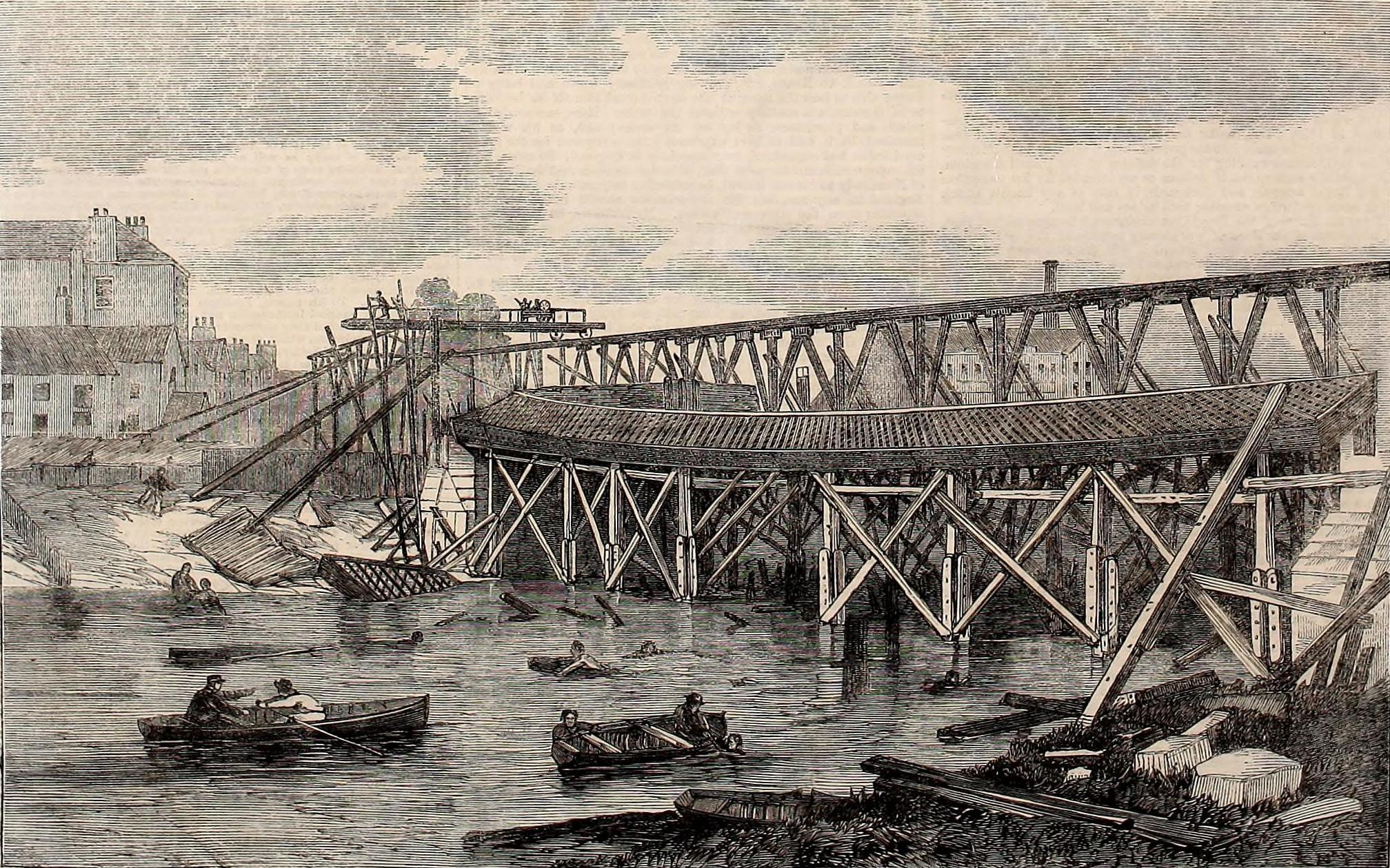
View of the ruins of an earlier version of the bridge, taken immediately after its fall

Page's bridge was the second attempt to build a bridge on the site. The first, authorised by the Lendal Bridge and York Improvement Act 1847 (10 & 11 Vict. c. ccv) begun in 1860 by William Dredge, collapsed during construction, and five workmen were killed. Parts of the structure were later taken to Scarborough and used in the Valley Bridge there.

Permission was obtained from Parliament in the Lendal Bridge and York Improvement Act 1860 (23 & 24 Vict. c. xix) for a new bridge to be built, and the Corporation of York requested Thomas Page to design a replacement. His Gothic Revival bridge opened in 1863. Together with the attached tollhouses it is a Grade II listed building. In August 1892, champion diver Tommy Burns dived off the bridge, watched by several hundred spectators and afterwards "gave an exhibition of ornamental swimming".

Lendal Bridge links Station Road with Museum Street and thus York railway station with York Minster, and is part of York's Inner Ring Road. The Dubliner pub, near the south end of the bridge, was formerly named the "Lendal Bridge Hotel".

Lendal Bridge was used in Damon and Debbie, a 1987 spin-off of soap Brookside for the scenes where long-running character Damon Grant was murdered. The BBC Television series 'Gunpowder' (2017) used Lendal Bridge as a location.

Motor traffic (except for buses) was restricted daily from 10.30 a.m. to 5.00 p.m. on Lendal Bridge during a six-month trial period from August 2013 to February 2014. The trial objectives were to establish whether a permanent restriction would reduce congestion in York city centre, improve the environment and improve the reliability of certain bus routes. The traffic ban was enforced with ANPR cameras. Air quality and bus route reliability increased during the trial but the public and business opinions on the trial were mixed and enforcement ruled invalid on a signage technicality so the bridge was re-opened to motor traffic after the trial.

=== Ouse Bridge (1821) ===
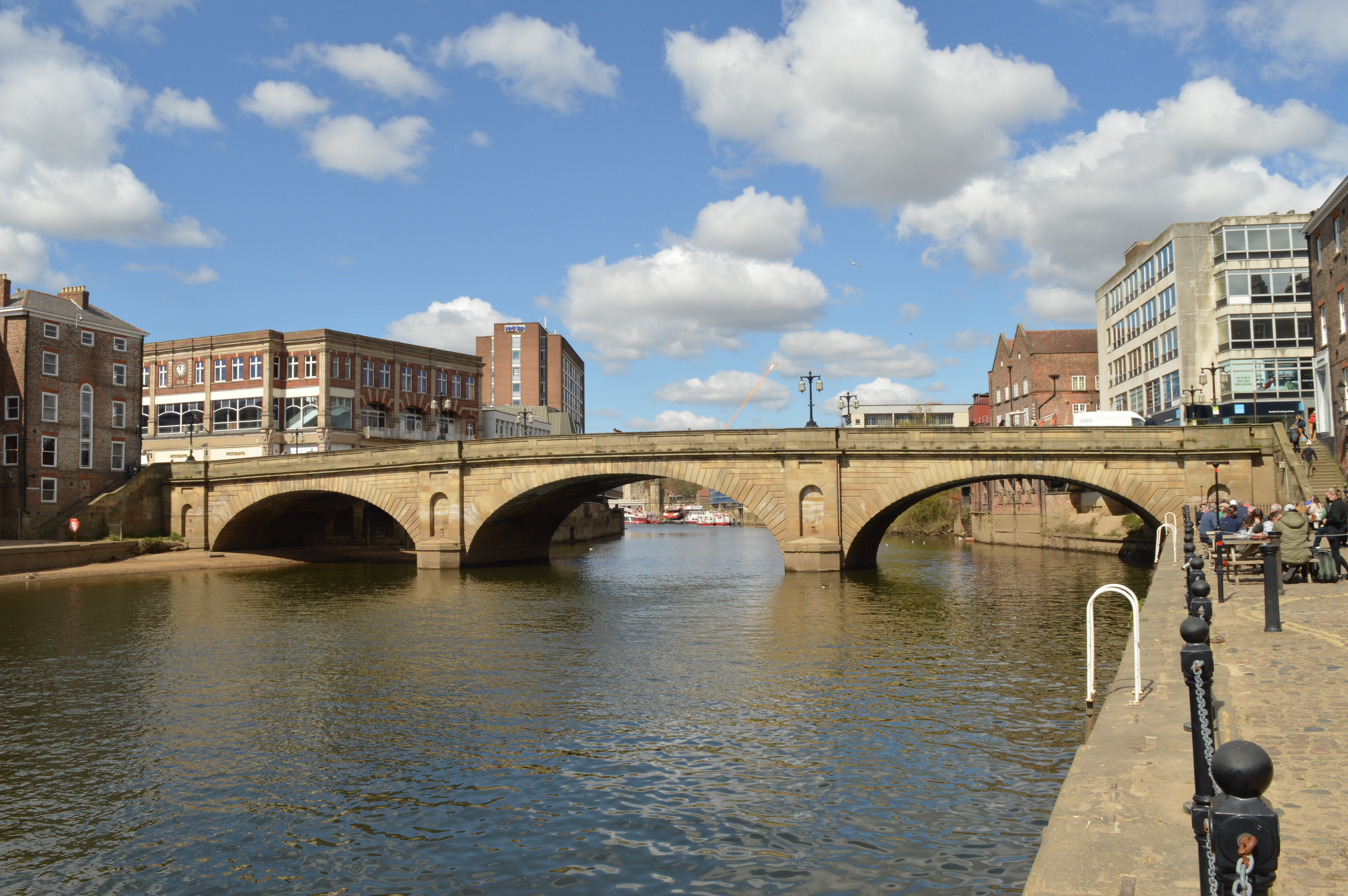
Ouse Bridge from King's Staith, looking upstream

The original Roman bridge over the Ouse was eventually replaced by a wooden bridge built further downstream by the Vikings. In 1154, it collapsed under the weight of a crowd which had gathered to greet St William of York on his return from exile. It was replaced by a stone bridge in the second half of the 12th century. In 1367 the first public toilets in Yorkshire, and likely England, were opened on the bridge. Part of the bridge was swept away by floods in the winter of 1564–65. The repaired bridge of 1565 had a new central arch spanning 81 ft, and was described by Defoe as "...near 70 foot [21 m] in diameter; it is, without exception, the greatest in England, some say it's as large as the Rialto at Venice, though I think not." There was originally a number of buildings on the bridge, including a chapel, jail, houses and shops; these were torn down between 1745 and 1793. This bridge was dismantled between 1810 and 1818 to make way for the New Ouse Bridge, designed by Peter Atkinson the younger, completed in 1821.

It is a Grade II listed building.

=== Skeldergate Bridge (1881) ===
Skeldergate Bridge from the South Bank, looking upstream

Skeldergate Bridge links the York Castle area to Bishophill. Parliament passed the York (Skeldergate Bridge) Improvement Act 1875 (38 & 39 Vict. c. lxii), after the city had determined that over 800 people were using the Skeldergate ferry crossing daily. It was designed in a Gothic Revival style by civil engineer George Gordon Page, and built between 1878 and 1881. The small arch at the east end had an opening portion, powered by machinery in the Motor House, which also served as a toll house and accommodation for the toll keeper and his family. The bridge opened to admit tall masted ships to the quays on either side of the river between Skeldergate and Ouse Bridges. The bridge was last opened in 1975, and the machinery has since been removed. Skeldergate Bridge was formally declared free of tolls on 1 April 1914. Together with the attached tollhouse, now a cafe, it is a Grade II listed building.

=== Millennium Bridge (2001) ===
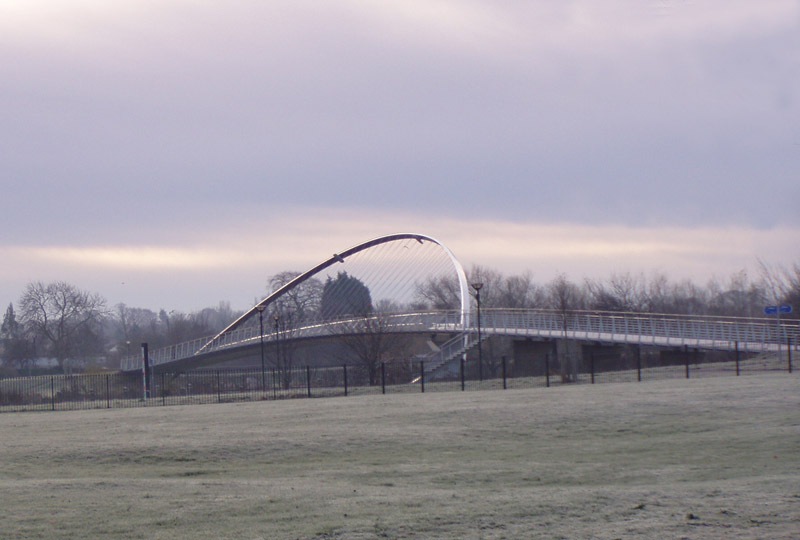
York Millennium Bridge from the South Bank, looking downstream

The Millennium Bridge, built to a competition-winning design by Whitby Bird and Partners, was opened on 10 April 2001, having cost £4.2 million to build. It spans the River Ouse to the south of York, linking Hospital Fields Road and Maple Grove in Fulford with Butcher Terrace on the South Bank. The bridge carries a cycle path and a footpath, and is not open to vehicular traffic. It is a key link in the Sustrans National Cycle Routes 65/66 and is part of the orbital route for York completed in 2011. The bridge shortened the walk or cycle for students from houses in the South Bank to the University of York (they previously had to travel via Skeldergate Bridge).

The bridge also acts a meeting place for local people, as it has a waist height shelf spanning the whole structure which facilitates sitting and admiring the view. Increasingly it is used as a circular walk from the city centre taking in the New Walk on the east bank and Terry Avenue and Rowntree Park on the west bank. While riverside paths regularly flood several times a year the bridge is higher and rarely cut off by floodwaters. Signs on approaches from Fulford Road /Hospital Fields Road junction and Butcher Terrace/Bishopthorpe Road warn when it may be impassable without wellies.

At night the bridge is illuminated by banks of lights in different colours, so that the colour of illumination changes every few seconds.

Supplies for Fulford Barracks were brought in by river near this location, and the remains of a narrow gauge railway may be seen on the eastern bank of the river a few yards toward the city. There used to be a rope ferry at this location as well. There may have been a rope ferry at one time, but in the 20th century it was a sculled ferry (rowed by a single oar at the stern) right into the 1950s when the ferry boat became motorised. It was particularly used by the Terry's workers (with their bikes), who lived on the Fulford side of the Ouse.

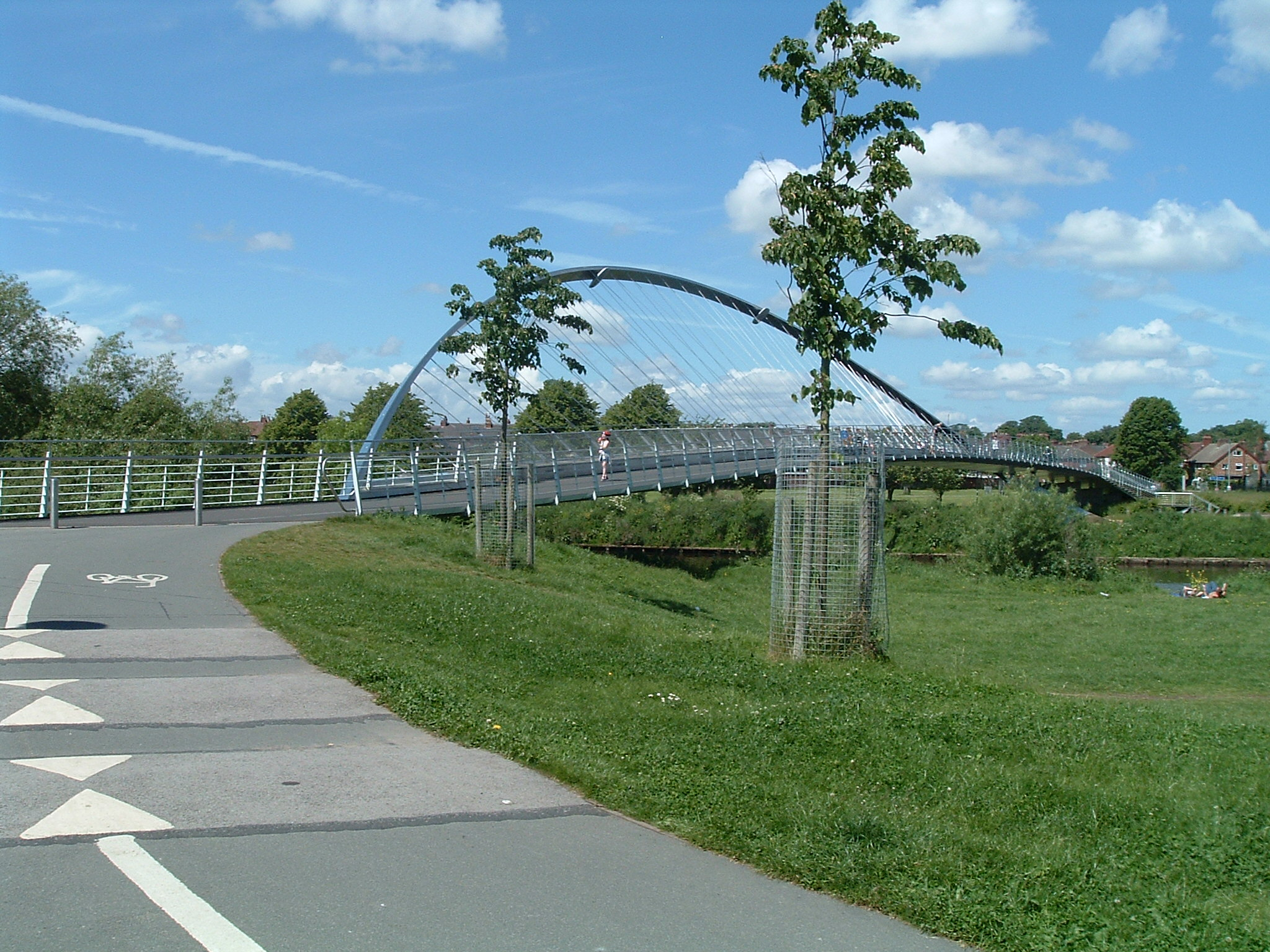
The Millennium Bridge from Fulford.

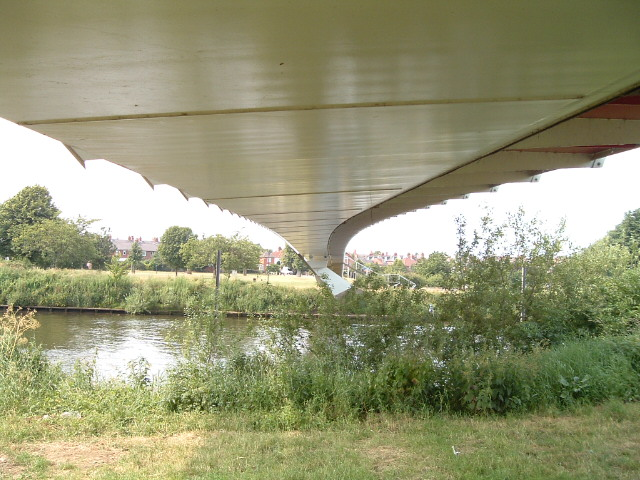
Below the bridge from Fulford.

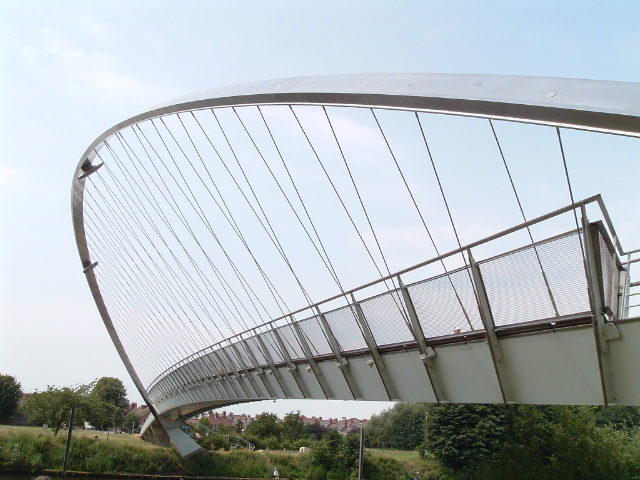
Millennium Bridge

=== Naburn Railway Bridge (1871) ===
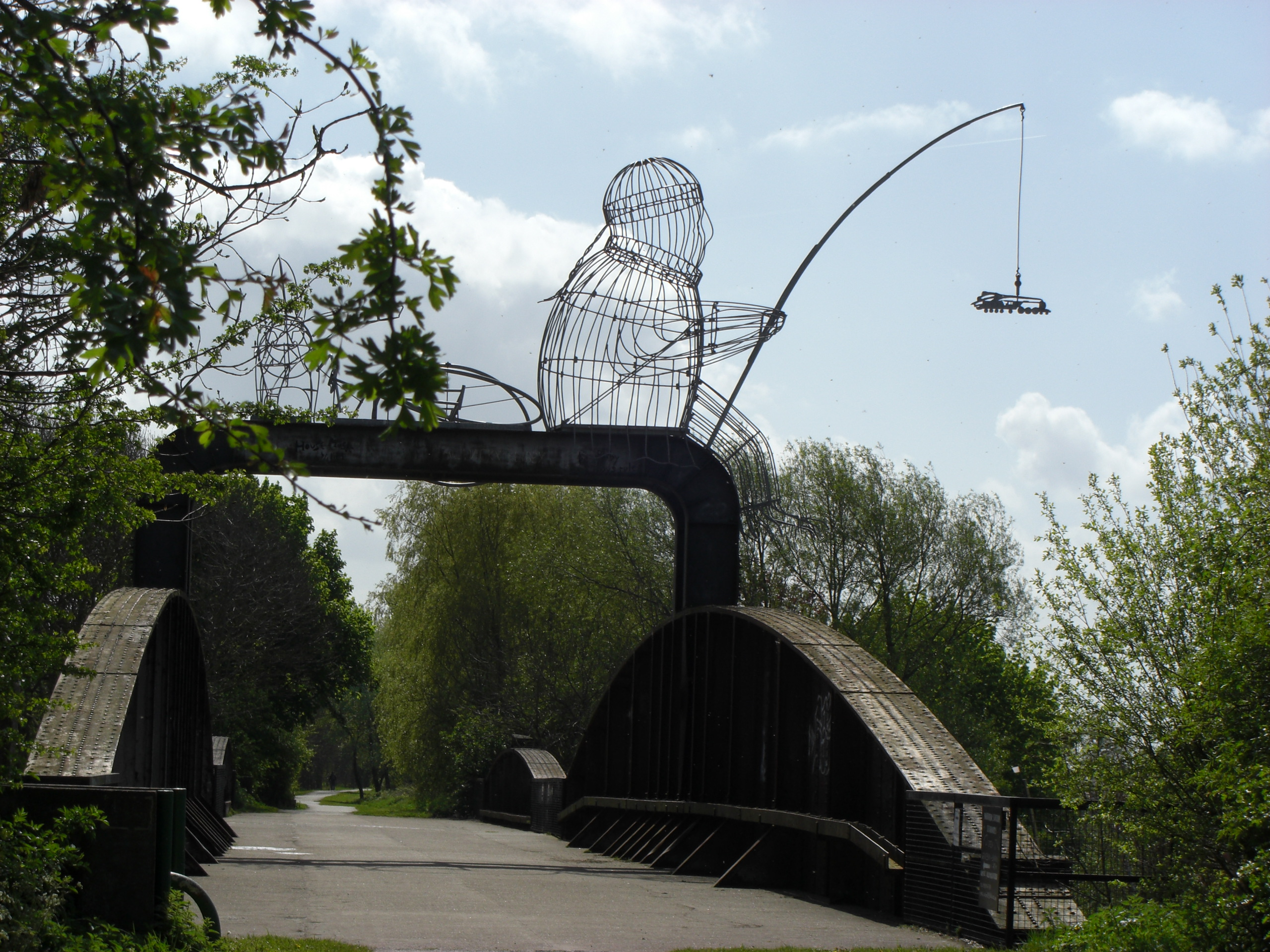
Naburn bridge and sculpture from west bank

Outside the outer ring-road, the Naburn swing bridge, built in 1871, used to carry the York-Selby railway until it was diverted in 1983. The bridge now constitutes part of the York & Selby cycle path, connecting the Trans Pennine trail to York. It is also known as the "Fisherman Bridge" due to a large metal sculpture of a fisherman with bike and dog, sitting on top which was added in 2000 as part of the York Council "Creative Communities 2000" scheme.

== Bridges over the Foss ==
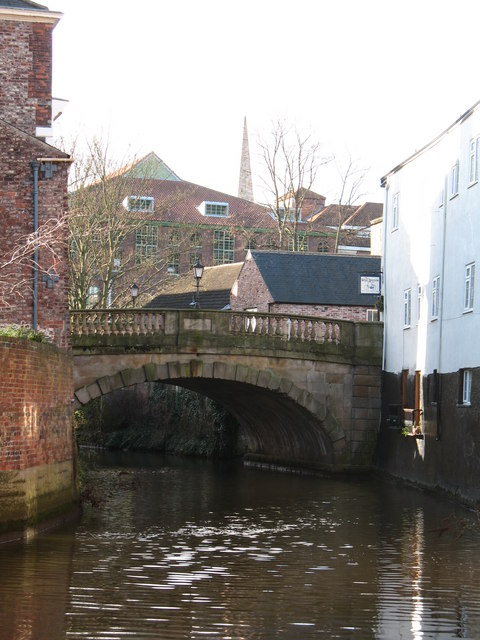
Foss Bridge from the north, looking downstream

From north to south, to the confluence with the Ouse, these are:

Bridge	Built	Type
A1237 — Outer Ring Road, Western and Northern	1987	Road
Church Lane Bridge	c. 1850	Road
Station Avenue Bridge	c. 1890	Pedestrian
Link Road Bridge	c. 1850	Road
Yearsley Grove pedestrian bridge	c. 1890	Pedestrian
Huntington Road Bridge	c. 1850	Road
Fossway Bridge	c. 1940	Road
Foss Islands Branch Line bridge	c. 1880	Pedestrian
Monk Bridge (A1036)	1794	Road
Foss Bank Bridge (A1036)	1998	Road
Layerthorpe Bridge (A1036)	1997	Road
Defra pedestrian bridge	1931	Pedestrian
Hungate Bridge	2011	Pedestrian
Rowntree Wharf pedestrian bridge	c. 1990	Pedestrian
Foss Bridge	1812	Road
Piccadilly Bridge	1914	Road
Castle Mills Bridge (A1036)	1956	Road
Blue Bridge	1930	Pedestrian

Many of these are small pedestrian crossings or unobtrusive modern bridges carrying main roads. The following are more notable:

=== Monk Bridge (1794) ===
Monk Bridge is a single-arched ashlar bridge with a span of approximately 20 feet (6 m). It carries traffic between central York and Heworth and was built in 1794 to designs by Peter Atkinson the elder. Between 1924 and 1926, the bridge was widened and the upper part rebuilt.

=== Pedestrian bridge from Foss Island Road to Defra site (1931) ===
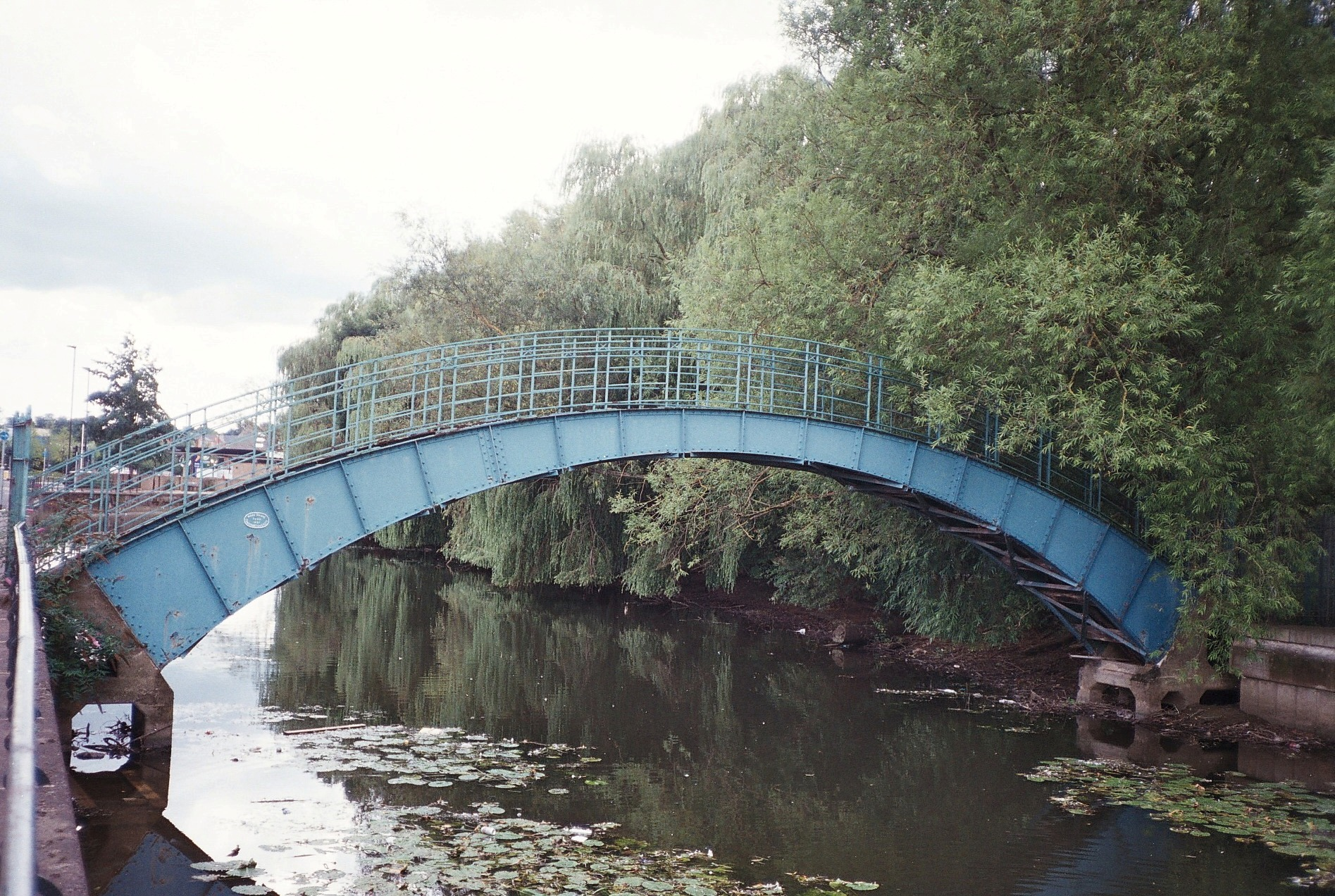
Defra pedestrian bridge from the west, looking downstream

This cast-iron pedestrian bridge from Foss Islands Road to what is now the Defra site at Peasholme Green was constructed in 1931 by the Monk Bridge Construction Company to improve communications between York's power station and its cooling tower, both now demolished. It is locked and not in use.

=== Hungate Bridge (2011) ===
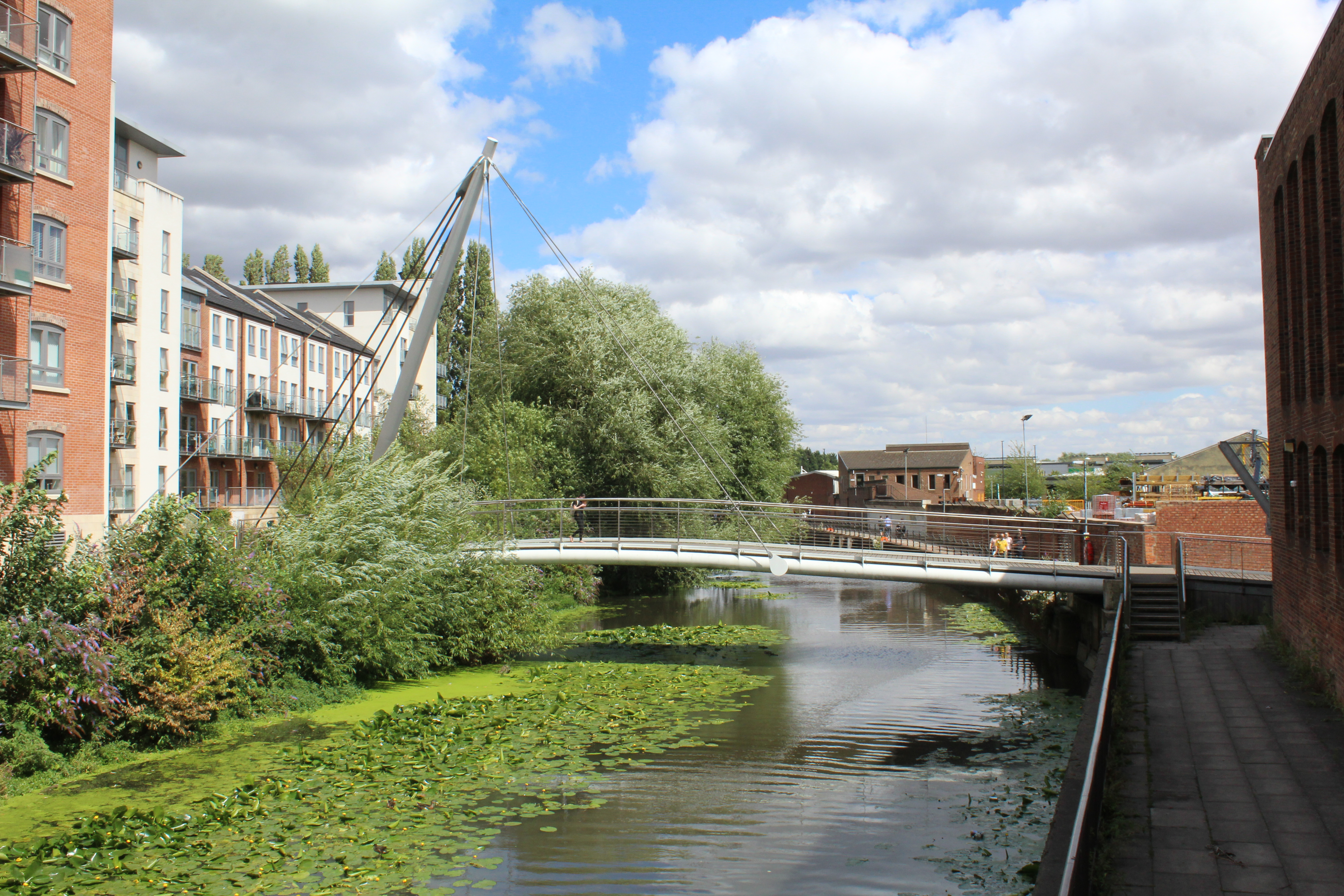
Hungate Bridge

Opened in September 2011, Hungate bridge is a cable-stayed cycle and foot bridge that links Navigation Road and Palmer Street. It has an 85 feet (26 m) span with a single supporting mast on the north bank.

National Cycle Network Route 658 uses the bridge. It is also on the route of the Way of the Roses coast to coast route and is part of York's network of traffic-free cycleways.

=== Foss Bridge (1812) ===
The Foss Bridge, a single Georgian gritstone arch with balusters, links the streets Fossgate and Walmgate. It is believed that the earliest bridge on this site was constructed during the Viking period. The present bridge, designed by Peter Atkinson the younger and erected in 1811–12, replaced a wooden bridge. The bridge was once the site of a fish market. It is a Grade II* listed building.

=== Blue Bridge (1930) ===
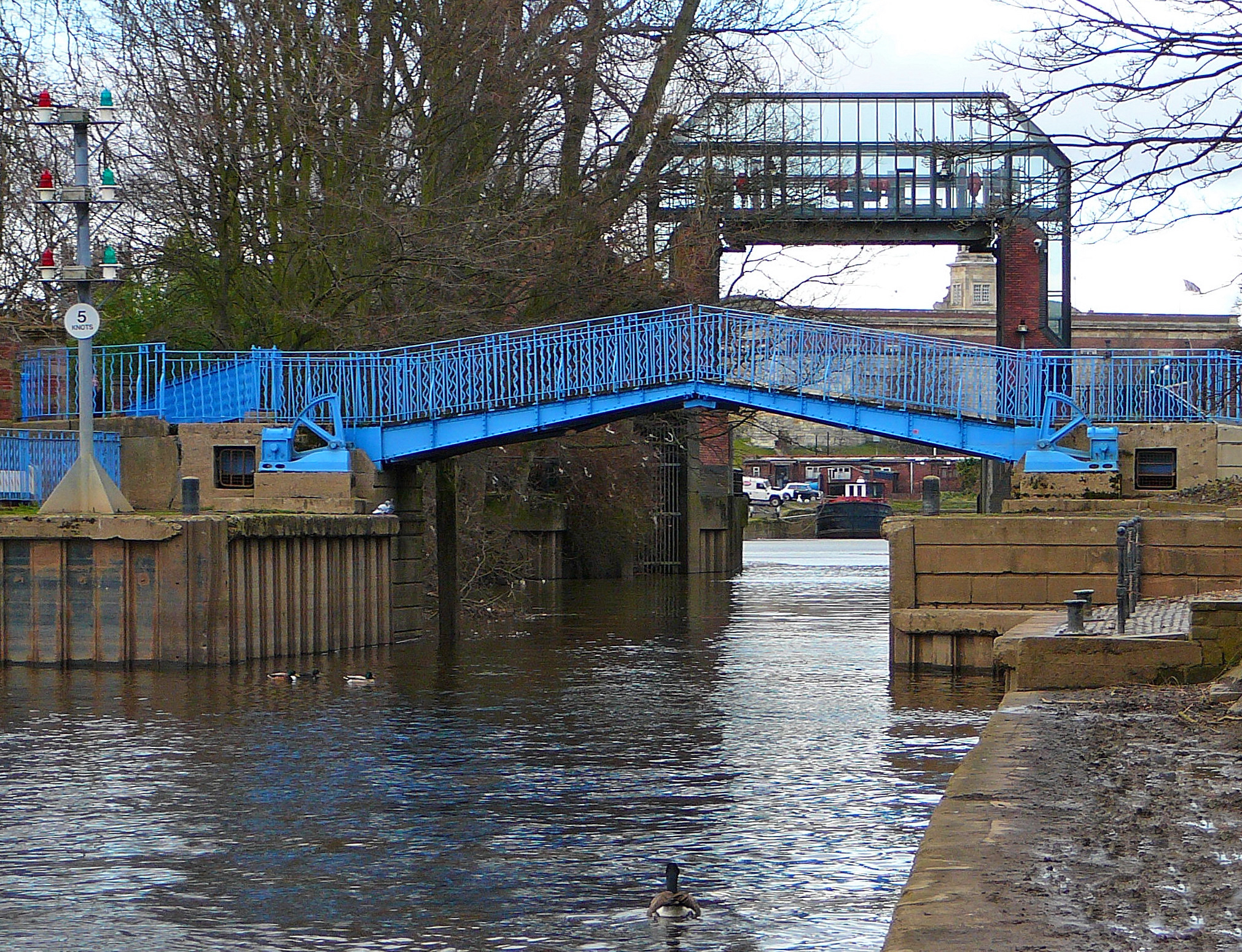
Blue Bridge, where the Ouse meets the Foss

The Blue Bridge crosses the River Foss just above its confluence with the River Ouse. The original bridge on the site was built in 1738, the current one being constructed in 1929–30.

In the early 1730s a section of the eastern river bank of the Ouse was improved, at the expense of the city, to create an area lined with trees along which the citizens could promenade. It proved so popular that within a few years this New Walk was extended further south past the junction with the Foss by way of a wooden drawbridge. This new bridge was painted blue and the colour and name have endured though the bridge itself has been replaced several times, the first of these being in 1768 when a single-arch stone bridge was constructed. In 1792 the Foss Navigation Company built a wooden swing-bridge to enable boats to access the Foss and this type of bridge was used again when the bridge was rebuilt in 1834. In 1857–58 an iron opening-bridge was built along with two stone plinths upon which stood two Russian cannons. These had been captured at the Battle of Sebastopol in 1855 and became the Crimean War Memorial in York and as such were retained when the current bridge was built in 1929–30 only to be removed in 1941 when they were scrapped and melted down for the war effort. In 2020, the bridge was to be temporarily removed for refurbishments, with a scaffold bridge taking its place.

== See also ==
- Grade II* listed buildings in the City of York
- Listed buildings in York (within the city walls, northern part)
- Listed buildings in York (within the city walls, southern part)
- Listed buildings in York (outside the city walls, southern part)
