= Valley Bridge =

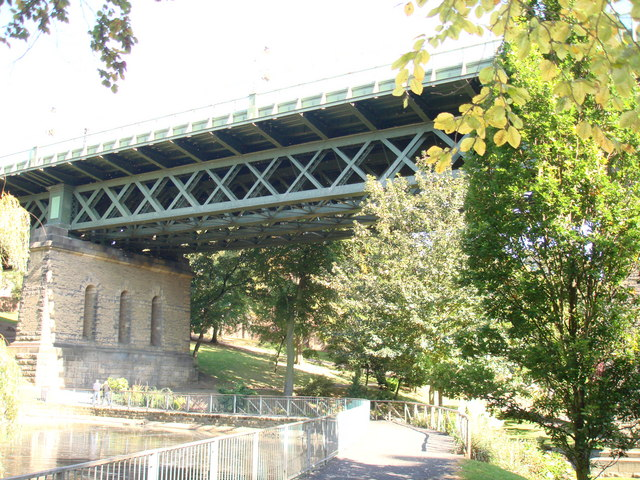
- Coordinates: 54°16′41″N 0°24′05″W
- Carries: A165 road
- Crosses: Ramsdale
- Locale: Scarborough, North Yorkshire, England

Characteristics
- Total length: 550 ft

History
- Opened: 1865

Valley Bridge is a road bridge in Scarborough, North Yorkshire, England. It spans Ramsdale and was built in 1865.

It was first built as Lendal Bridge, York, but it collapsed there and was later brought to Scarborough.
