= The Maltings, York =

Pub in North Yorkshire, England

The Maltings
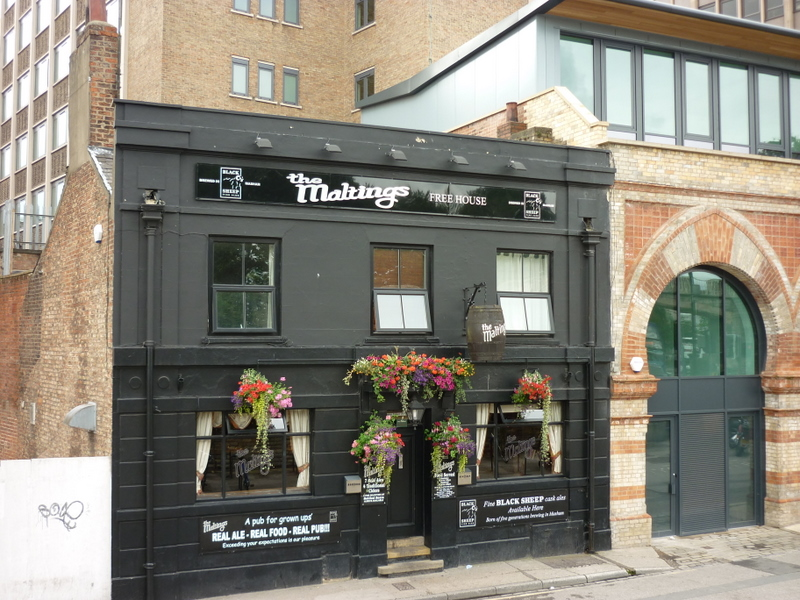
- The pub in 2010
- Former names: Railway Tavern; Lendal Bridge Hotel; Lendal Bridge Inn
- Alternative names: The Dubliner

General information
- Type: Public house
- Location: Tanner's Moat, York, England
- Coordinates: 53.9593°N 1.0879°W
- Opening: 1842; 184 years ago

The Maltings was a historic pub on Tanner's Moat in York, England.

The pub opened in 1842 as the Railway Tavern, a short walk from York railway station, which had opened the previous year. The opening of Lendal Bridge nearby increased its trade, although the relocation of York railway station reduced it. In light of these changes, in 1885 it was renamed the "Lendal Bridge Hotel".

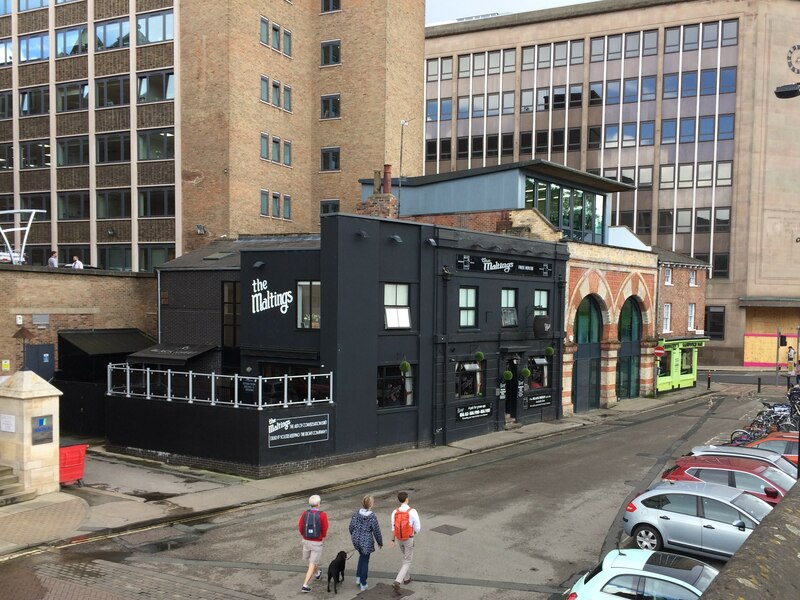
View of the pub from Lendal Bridge in 2017

The building had rooms for travellers, and was sometimes referred to as an inn. It was also occasionally used to hold inquests into deaths. In 1902, it was recorded as having a smoke room, a tap room, and a serving bar.

The pub was acquired by Bass Brewery, which sold it in 1992 to Anita Adams. Its new landlord, Shaun Collinge, the son-in-law of Adams, remained in post for more than thirty years. The building was painted black in 2009 and extended in 2012, leading Nathen Amin to describe it as "one of York's most distinctive pubs". It stocked a wide range of real ales, up to 60 a month, leading to it regularly appearing in the Campaign for Real Ale's Good Beer Guide. For two years in a row, it was named national Cask Ale Pub of the Year by the Morning Advertiser. As well as cask ales it also stocked a wide range of cider, leading to it being a regular winner of the local CAMRA Branch's Cider Pub of the Year award.

In 2023, The Guardian described it as Britain's "strictest pub", based on its prohibition of singing, hen and stag parties, fancy dress, and swearing.

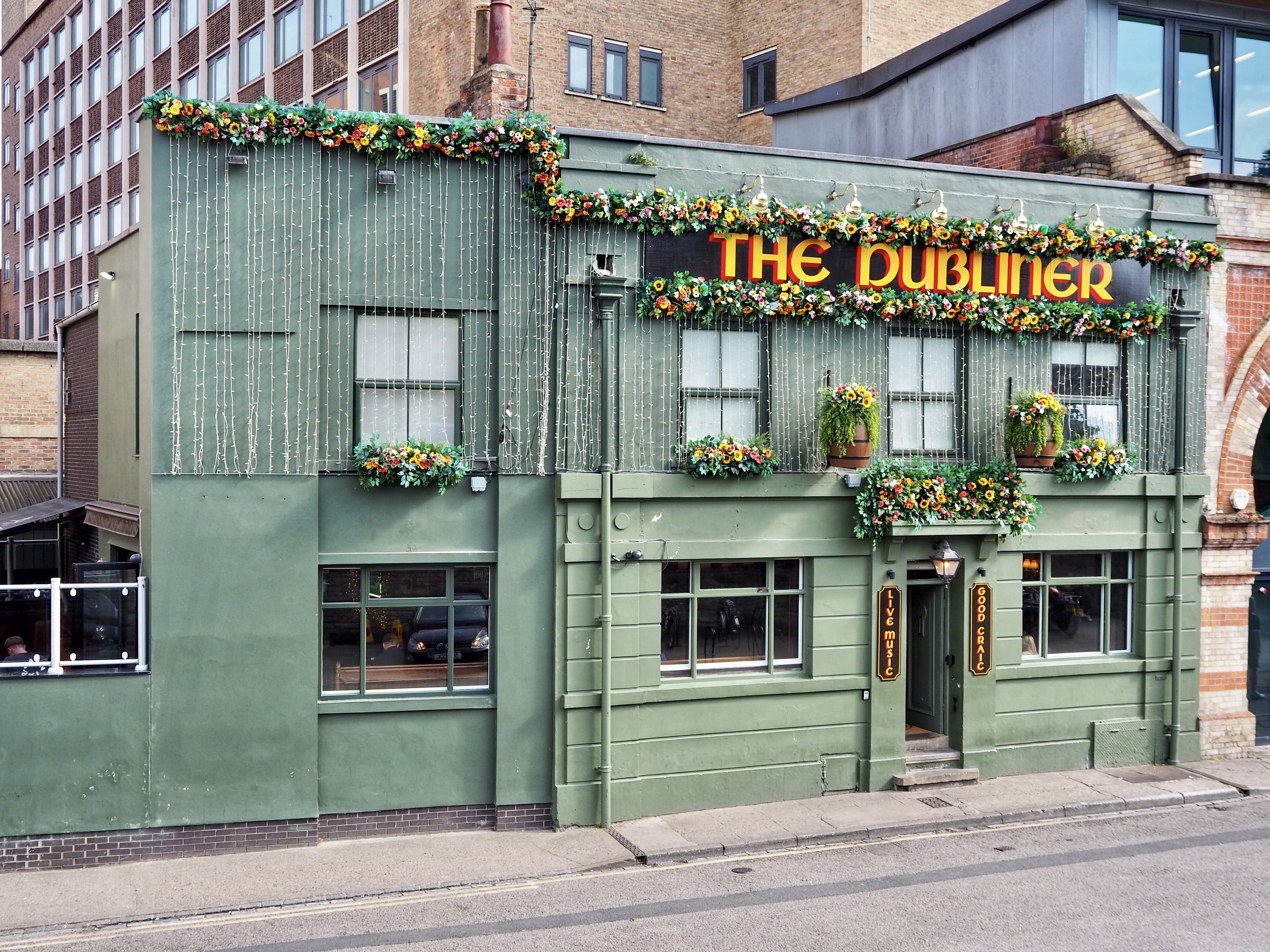
The pub in 2025, trading as The Dubliner

The pub was put up for sale in 2023, at a price of £1.5 million, reduced in 2024 to £1.35 million. It eventually closed in October 2024, and reopened in December 2024 as The Dubliner, an Irish-themed bar chain.
