= A1237 road =

Part of the ring road around York, England

A1237

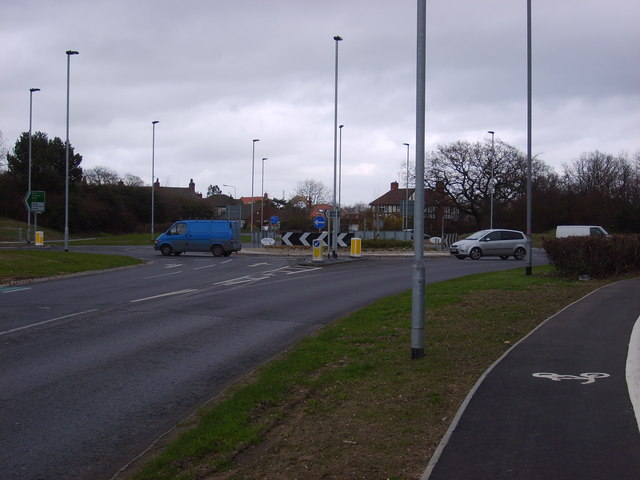
- Roundabout at the junction of A1237 and Strensall Road

Route information
- Length: 10 mi (16 km)

Major junctions
- North East end: A64 junction (Hopgrove)
- A59; A19
- South West end: A64 Junction (Copmanthorpe/Askham Bryan)

Location
- Country: United Kingdom

Road network
- Roads in the United Kingdom; Motorways; A and B road zones

The A1237 road is a road that runs to the west and north of the city of York, England. It forms part of the York Outer Ring Road as either end of the route forms junctions with the A64 to the south-west and east of the city to act as a city distributor. Construction began in 1984 and consisted of three distinct building phases. The road took three years to complete and has been subject since to studies looking to improve traffic flow and reduce accidents. The National Speed Limit for an A Class Road applies.

== History ==
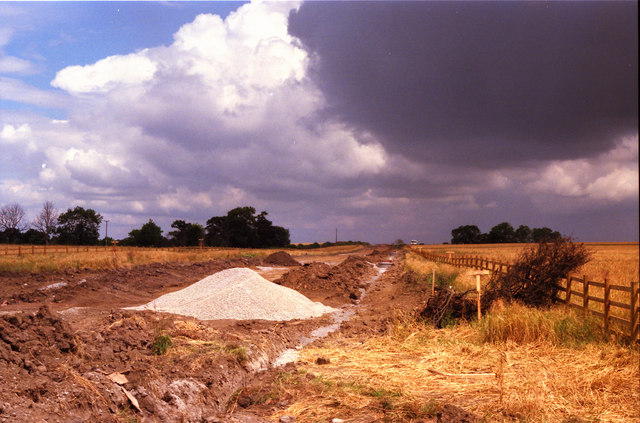
A1237 York outer ring road during construction near junction for Acomb, Acomb Park and Askham Bryan

An outer ring road for York had been proposed as far back as 1948 by members of York City Council's Civic Committee. The scheme proposed by Adshead, Needham and Minter was grander in scale than currently exists. The northern section, based on junctions with the old A64 route, would have started clockwise from the current A64 eastbound turn-off to Askham Richard and Bilbrough. It would have passed to the north west of Nether Poppleton and Skelton. It would still run south of Haxby and Wigginton, but continue more easterly than the current road to rejoin the A64 north of Stockton-on-the-Forest.

The case for a solution to the increasing traffic management issues in the centre of the city of York during the 1960s were primarily to aid the local tourism industry. The first proposals were for an inner ring road that would be a dual carriageway. This met opposition as it would call for demolition of homes and many archaeological sites. This resulted in a public inquiry in 1972 that backed the inner ring road proposal, but the decision remained with the Secretary of State for the Environment, who eventually ruled against it in 1975, by which time the construction of the dual carriageway A64 was nearly complete.

The inner ring road proposals were in contrast to 1958 report for the Minister for Housing and Local Government and the local council, by Lord Esher, entitled York: A Study in Conservation. This attempted to address modernising four English cities without undue impact on their heritage. The York Corporation, in contrast, still maintained their preference for the inner ring road, though this was subsequently limited to the current layout around the outside of the city walls.

To cater for the numerous proposed developments on the outskirts of York, such as Clifton Moor, the decision was taken to construct a road to the west and north of York to link to the A64. This came out of evidence given to the 1972 Public Inquiry into the proposed new Inner Ring Road. Studies conducted by Professor Smeed indicated an Outer Ring Road with radial roads was the best solution.

The A1237 was the second part of the outer ring road and was constructed in three phases some 11 years after the first part, the A64 York Bypass, was completed. This was due to different organisations being responsible for the two roads and their strategic planning. The first phase of construction started in 1984 on the northern section between the A19 and the A64. It opened in 1986. Phase two and three started construction in 1985 with the second and third sections opening the following year in September and December respectively. Phase two was between the A64 and the A59 and phase three was the short section between the A59 and A19. This section took longer to construct due to it having to cross the River Ouse and the East Coast Main Line. Phase three was opened by the Secretary of State for Transport Paul Channon on 11 December 1987.

== Route ==
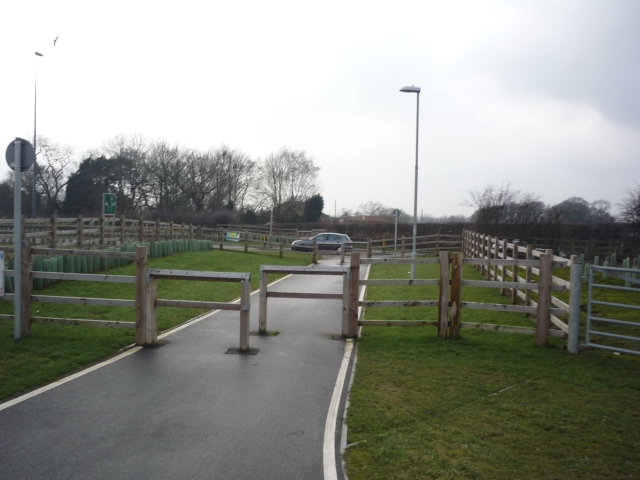
Cycle crossing for A1237 near junction for Acomb, Acomb Park and Askham Bryan

This is a single carriageway road, and has twelve roundabouts. Starting at the western end going clockwise, the road begins as one of the exits from the grade separated junction with the A64 exit for Copmanthorpe, Askham Bryan and York North. The last 1 mile section ends with the double roundabout at Hopgrove that links Malton Road and the A1237 with the A64 to complete the York Outer Ring Road.

A1237 Road
Clockwise exits	Junction type	Distance from previous roundabout	Anti-clockwise exits
Askham Fields Lane	Roundabout		A64 (East and Westbound)
Askham Bryan Lane	Roundabout	1.2 miles	Askham Lane & Moor Lane
B1224 westbound to Wetherby	Roundabout	1.4 miles	B1224 eastbound to Acomb
	Give way		Main Street, Knapton
Moor Lane	Give way
A59 westbound to Knaresborough	Roundabout	1.2 miles	A59 eastbound to Acomb
	Roundabout	0.7 miles	Great North Way; Millfield Lane
A19 northbound to Skelton	Roundabout	0.8 miles	A19 southbound to Clifton & Rawcliffe Bar Park & Ride
	Roundabout	0.8 miles	Clifton Moor Gate
B1363 northbound to Wigginton	Roundabout	0.7 miles	B1363 southbound to York & Stirling Avenue
Haxby road northbound to Haxby	Roundabout	0.8 miles	Haxby Road southbound to New Earswick
Strensall Road northbound to Earswick	Roundabout	0.7 miles	Strensall Road southbound to Huntington
North Lane eastbound	Roundabout	0.7 miles	Monks Cross Link & North Lane westbound
Malton Lane eastbound & A64 eastbound to Malton	Roundabout	1 mile	Malton Lane westbound to York

== Improvements ==
=== Implemented ===
In 2009 the roundabout with Malton Lane and the Hopgrove roundabout was improved by adding extra lanes and Traffic signals.

In 2011 the roundabout on the A19 junction was upgraded at a cost of £1.2M and took about 12 weeks. Access and exits were widened; improved crossings; resurfacing and improved lighting and signage were done.

In 2014, the roundabout that formed the junction between the ring road and the A59 was improved by York City Council in time for the 2014 Tour de France Stage 2 to pass over it.

In 2015 the City Council in partnership with North Yorkshire Police, Joseph Rowntree Foundation and Joseph Rowntree School created a shared cycle/footpath by the ring road between the Haxby Road and Wigginton Road roundabouts.

In 2018 the roundabout with B1224 was replaced with a larger one. The new roundabout has wider access and exits; improved crossings; new signage and new lighting added.

=== Proposed ===
Several bodies have proposed improvements to the A1237 including:

- Dualling the road by 2030 as detailed in the North Yorkshire Strategic Prospectus.
- In the West Yorkshire Plus Transport Fund (York Schemes), improvements to seven roundabouts between the Wetherby Road and Monks Cross junctions. The design includes ensuring room for future dualling of the carriageways; increasing the number of approach and exit lanes at the roundabouts; enlarging their diameter; three subways for pedestrians/cyclists at busy crossing points and two bridges to accommodate a widened road.
- On 3 March 2015 the Executive of York City Council resolved to progress Option 1 of the report into improvements to the York Outer Ring Road. This was to carry out the work recommended in the West Yorkshire Plus Transport Fund (York Schemes)
- On 12 October 2022 plans were submitted by the City of York Council to convert a 4.6-mile (7.5 km) section of the A1237, between the A19 Shipton Road and the A1036 at Little Hopgrove, into a dual carriageway.

=== Rejected ===
Congestion immediately became a problem, especially at peak times, and the 1989 Department for Transport's Roads for Prosperity white paper included improvements to the section between (A19 to the A64). The proposals were for a new continuous through-route running parallel to the existing road with just a single grade separated junction at the B1363. The existing road, and the roundabouts, would have been retained for local access. The plans were subsequently dropped.

Plans for dualling 7.8 km, at a cost £31M, of the A1237 York Outer Ring Road were rejected by the Regional Transport Board in 2009.

== Traffic studies ==
Congestion at peak times remains an issue and has led to studies that show that delays at all junctions will lead to an increase in journey times ranging between two and three times longer compared to 2003. A study from March 2001 and February also recorded 172 accidents, of which 21 were serious and 5 involved a fatality.
