= York Outer Ring Road =

Ring road around York, England

The York Outer Ring Road is a ring road around the city of York, England. The south-eastern section is part of the A64 and the north-western section is the A1237.

== History ==
=== Construction ===
An outer ring road for York had been proposed as far back as 1948 but it wasn't until 1976 that the first section, the York Bypass, opened. The second section was constructed in three phases. The first phase, the northern section between the A19 and the A64, opened in 1986, the second and third sections opened the following year - phase two was between the A64 and the A59 and phase three was the short section between the A59 and A19 - this section took longer to construct due to it having to cross the River Ouse and the East Coast Main Line. Phase three was opened by the Secretary of State for Transport Paul Channon on 11 December 1987.

=== Improvements ===
In 2009 the roundabout with Malton Lane and the Hopgrove roundabout was improved by adding extra lanes and Traffic signals.

In 2011 the roundabout on the A19 junction was upgraded at a cost of £1.2M and took about 12 weeks. Access and exits were widened; improved crossings; resurfacing and improved lighting and signage were done.

In 2014, the roundabout that formed the junction between the ring road and the A59 was improved by York City Council in time for the 2014 Tour de France Stage 2 to pass over it.

In 2018 the roundabout with B1224 was replaced with a larger one. The new roundabout has wider access and exits; improved crossings; new signage and new lighting added.

== Proposed improvements ==
Several bodies have proposed improvements to the single carriageway A1237. These include:

- Dualling the road by 2030 as detailed in the North Yorkshire Strategic Prospectus.
- In the West Yorkshire Plus Transport Fund (York Schemes), improvements to seven roundabouts between the Wetherby Road and Monks Cross junctions. The design includes ensuring room for future dualling of the carriageways; increasing the number of approach and exit lanes at the roundabouts; enlarging their diameter; three subways for pedestrians/cyclists at busy crossing points and two bridges to accommodate a widened road. and on 3 March 2015 the Executive of York City Council resolved to progress Option 1 of the report into improvements to the York Outer Ring Road. This was to carry out the work recommended in the West Yorkshire Plus Transport Fund (York Schemes)
- On 12 October 2022 plans were submitted by the City of York Council to convert a 4.6-mile (7.5km) section of the A1237, between the A19 Shipton Road and the A1036 at Little Hopgrove, into a dual carriageway.

== Route ==
The south-eastern section (A64) runs as a continuous dual carriageway with grade separated junctions at Grimston Bar (A1079/A166), Fulford (A19) and Askham Bar (A1036).

The north-western section (A1237) is a single carriageway road, and has eleven roundabouts.

== Timeline ==
- 1976: A64 York bypass completed
- 1984: Start of construction of A1237 Phase I (A19 to A64)
- 1985: Start of construction of A1237 Phase II (A64 to A59) and Phase III (A59 to A19)
- 1986: Phase I completed
- September 1987: Phase II completed
- December 1987: Phase III completed
